= List of ambassadors of Indonesia to Belgium =

Ambassador of Indonesia to Belgium
- Seal of the Ministry of Foreign Affairs of Indonesia

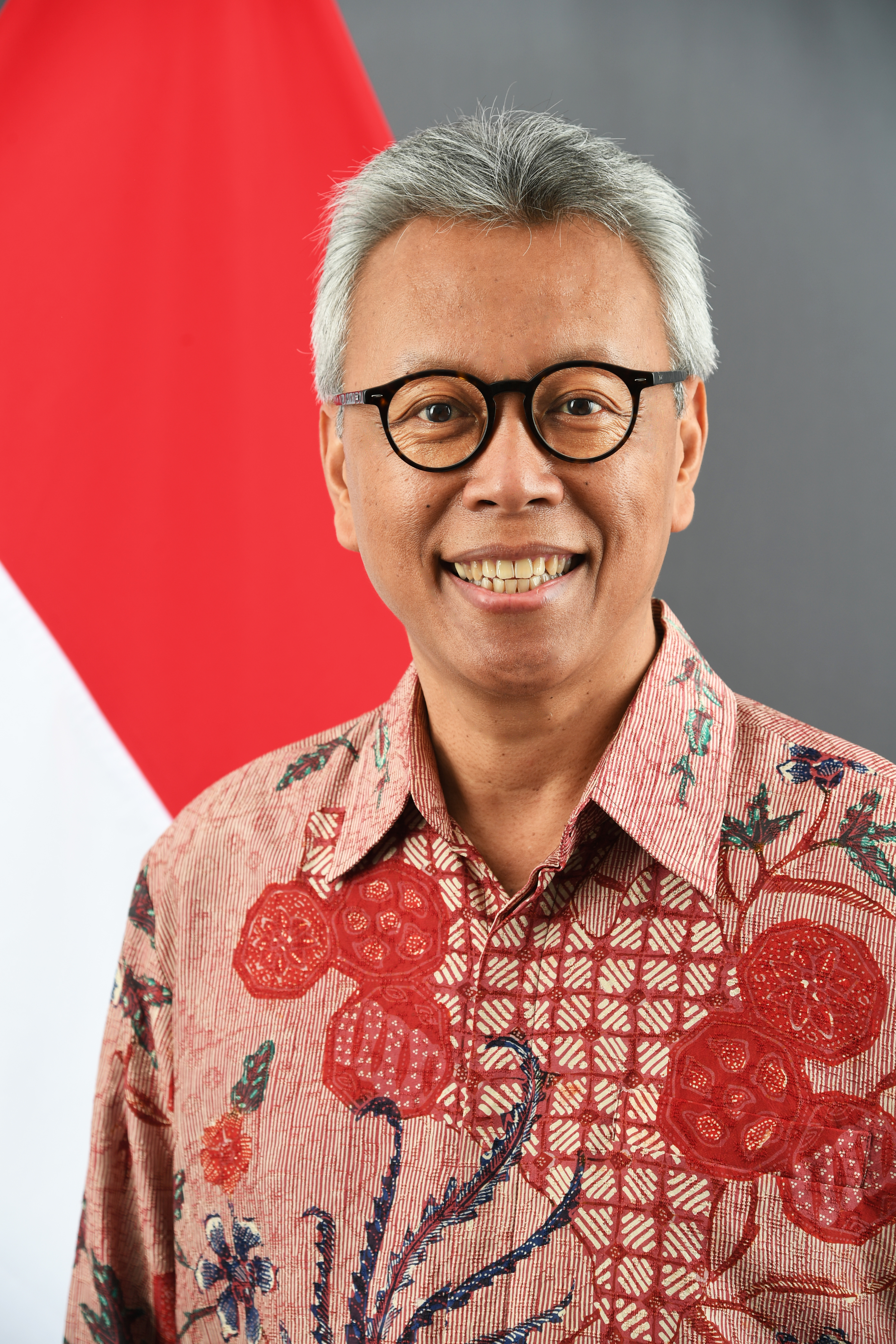
- Incumbent; Andy Rachmianto since 8 October 2025
- Residence: Brussels
- Nominator: The president
- Appointer: The president with consideration from the House of Representatives
- Formation: 1949; 77 years ago
- First holder: Ide Anak Agung Gde Agung
- Website: www.kemlu.go.id/brussel/tentang-perwakilan/daftar-pejabat-dan-staff

The following lists Indonesian officials who have served as ambassadors to Belgium.

== List of ambassadors ==
| Name | Background | Appointment | Presentation of credentials | Termination of mission |
|---|---|---|---|---|
| Ide Anak Agung Gede Agung | Political appointee | | | |
| Mohammad Razif | Career diplomat | | | |
| Wiwoho Purbohadidjojo | Political appointee | | | |
| Laili Roesad | Career diplomat | | | |
| Tojib Hadiwidjaja | Political appointee | | | |
| Aboeprajitno | Political appointee | | | |
| Idrus Nasir Djajadiningrat | Military | | | |
| Chaidir Anwar Sani | Career diplomat | 10 October 1970 | 2 December 1970 | 3 February 1972 |
| Johan Maramis | Career diplomat | | 25 February 1972 | 1 July 1973 |
| Frans Seda | Political appointee | | 22 July 1973 | 27 January 1976 |
| Atmono Suryo | Career diplomat | | 18 March 1976 | 23 November 1978 |
| Kahono Martohadinegoro | Career diplomat | | | |
| Rusli Noor | Career diplomat | | | |
| Atmono Suryo | Career diplomat | | | |
| Teuku Muhammad Zahirsjah | Political appointee | | | |
| Sabana Kartasasmita | Political appointee | | | |
| I Gusti Ngurah Ketut Sumantera | Career diplomat | | | |
| Sulaiman Abdul Manan | Career diplomat | | | |
| Nadjib Riphat Kesoema | Career diplomat | | | |
| Arif Havas Oegroseno | Career diplomat | 10 August 2010 | | January 2015 |
| Yuri Octavian Thamrin | Career diplomat | 13 January 2016 | | 2020 |
| Andri Hadi | Career diplomat | 14 September 2020 | | 29 December 2025 |
| Andy Rachmianto | Career diplomat | 8 October 2025 | | incumbent |

== Chargé d'affaires ad interim ==
During the vacancy between the departure of the outgoing ambassador and th arrival of the incoming ambassador, the embassy is led by the deputy chief of mission. In the absence of the deputy chief of mission, the embassy is instead led by the highest-ranked official in the embassy.

| Name | Took office | Left office | Permanent office |
|---|---|---|---|
| Ignacio Kristanyo Hardojo | 2015 | 2016 | Deputy chief of mission |
| Widhiastono | 29 December 2025 | 2 February 2026 | Economic affairs coordinator |
