= List of ambassadors of Indonesia to the European Union =

Ambassador of Indonesia to the European Union
- Seal of the Ministry of Foreign Affairs of Indonesia

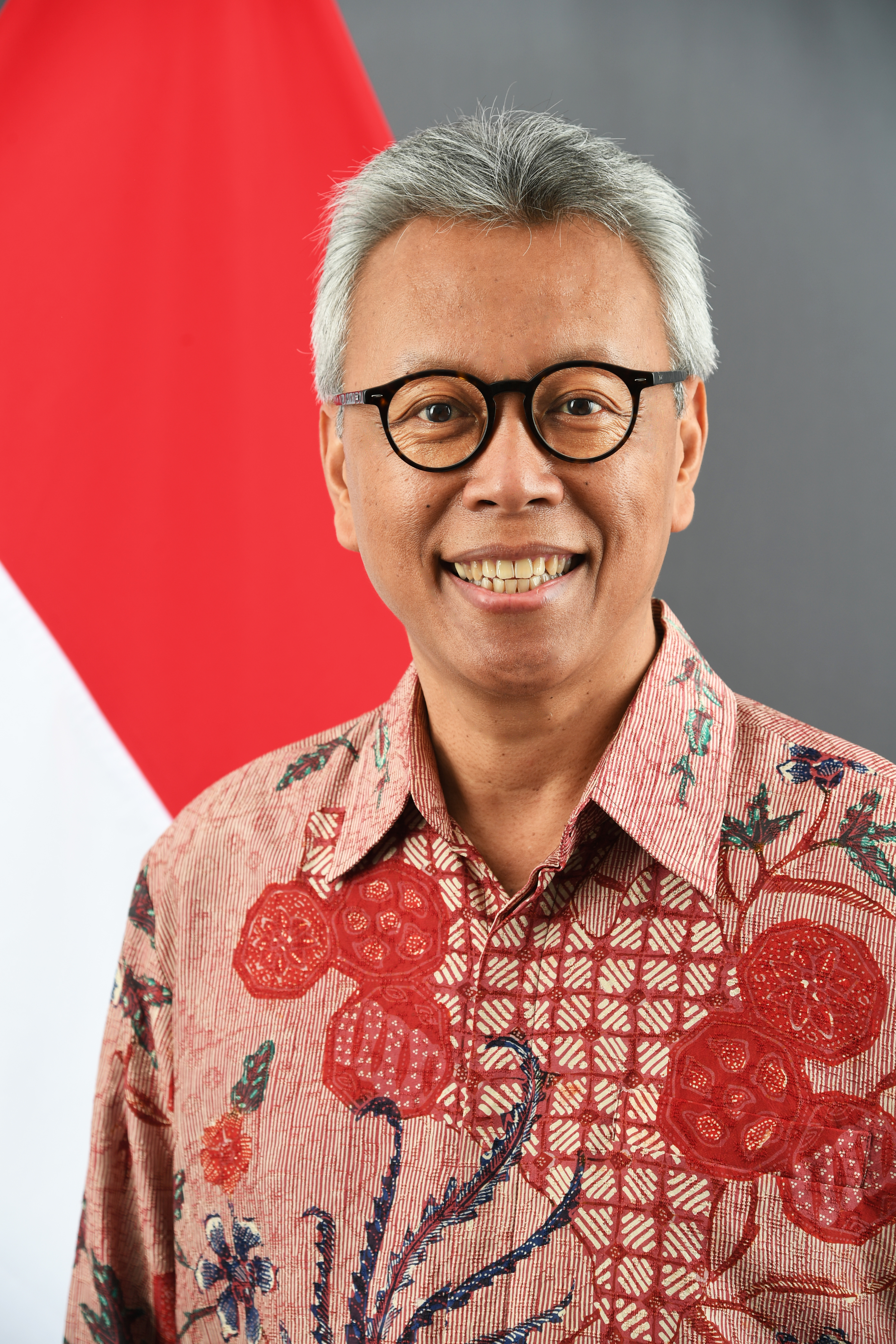
- Incumbent; Andy Rachmianto since 8 October 2025
- Residence: Brussels
- Nominator: The president
- Appointer: The president; with consideration from the House of Representatives
- Formation: 1967; 59 years ago
- First holder: Idrus Nasir Djajadiningrat
- Website: www.kemlu.go.id/brussel/tentang-perwakilan/daftar-pejabat-dan-staff

The following lists Indonesian officials who have served as ambassadors to the European Union and its predecessor, the European Communities.

== History ==
The Indonesian ambassador to Belgium and Luxemburg began to be accredited to the European Communities after the Merger Treaty, which unified three major European executive agencies, went into effect in 1967. This arrangement was in place until 1990, when the embassy's section responsible for relations with the European Communities split to form the permanent mission of Indonesia to the European Communities (PRI-ME, Perutusan R.I. untuk Masyarakat Eropa). PRI-ME was closed in 2005 and the ambassador to Belgium was re-accredited to the European Union. After the Treaty of Lisbon went into effect in 2010, the European Union, which had been in existence since 1994, was given full legal personality, allowing Indonesia to accredit its ambassador to the institution.

== List of ambassadors ==
Name	Background	Appointment	Presentation of credentials	Termination of mission	Notes
Idrus Nasir Djajadiningrat	Military		5 November 1968		(Note: Held by the ambassador to Belgium; accredited to the European Communities)
Chaidir Anwar Sani	Career diplomat	10 October 1970	24 January 1971	3 February 1972	(Note: Held by the ambassador to Belgium; accredited to the European Communities)
Johan Maramis	Career diplomat		24 March 1972	1 July 1973	(Note: Held by the ambassador to Belgium; accredited to the European Communities)
Frans Seda	Political appointee		21 September 1973	27 January 1976	(Note: Held by the ambassador to Belgium; accredited to the European Communities)
Atmono Suryo	Career diplomat		6 April 1976	23 November 1978	(Note: Held by the ambassador to Belgium; accredited to the European Communities)
Kahono Martohadinegoro	Career diplomat		12 December 1978		(Note: Held by the ambassador to Belgium; accredited to the European Communities)
Rusli Noor	Career diplomat		22 February 1983		(Note: Held by the ambassador to Belgium; accredited to the European Communities)
Atmono Suryo	Career diplomat		29 September 1986		(Note: Atmono was Indonesia's ambassador to Belgium, concurrently accredited to the European Communities. When the permanent mission to the European Communities was established separately in 1990, Atmono relinquished his duties as ambassador to Belgium and was accredited solely to the European Communities.)
Adrianus Mooy	Political appointee		28 January 1994		(Note: Accredited to the European Communities.)
Pudji Kuntarso	Career diplomat		5 July 1995		(Note: Accredited to the European Communities.)
Nasrudin Sumintapura	Political appointee		12 July 1999		(Note: Accredited to the European Communities.)
Abdurrachman Mattalitti	Career diplomat	6 August 2003	23 October 2003	2006	(Note: Accredited to the European Communities.)
Nadjib Riphat Kesoema	Career diplomat		18 January 2007		(Note: Held by the ambassador to Belgium; accredited to the European Communities)
Arif Havas Oegroseno	Career diplomat	10 August 2010	24 November 2010	January 2015	(Note: Held by the ambassador to Belgium; accredited to the European Union following the Maastricht Treaty which granted the EU full international legal personality.)
Yuri Octavian Thamrin	Career diplomat	13 January 2016	15 April 2016	2020	(Note: Held by the ambassador to Belgium; accredited to the European Union following the Maastricht Treaty which granted the EU full international legal personality.)
Andri Hadi	Career diplomat	14 September 2020	11 February 2021	29 December 2025	(Note: Held by the ambassador to Belgium; accredited to the European Union following the Maastricht Treaty which granted the EU full international legal personality.)
Andy Rachmianto	Career diplomat	8 October 2025	5 May 2026	2013	(Note: Held by the ambassador to Belgium; accredited to the European Union following the Maastricht Treaty which granted the EU full international legal personality.)

== Chargé d'affaires ad interim ==
During the vacancy between the departure of the outgoing ambassador and th arrival of the incoming ambassador, the embassy is led by the deputy chief of mission. In the absence of the deputy chief of mission, the embassy is instead led by the highest-ranked official in the embassy.

Name	Took office	Left office	Permanent office
Ignacio Kristanyo Hardojo	2015	2016	Deputy chief of mission
Widhiastono	29 December 2025	2 February 2026	Economic affairs coordinator
