= Saud Purwanto Krisnawan =

Indonesian diplomat (born 1971)

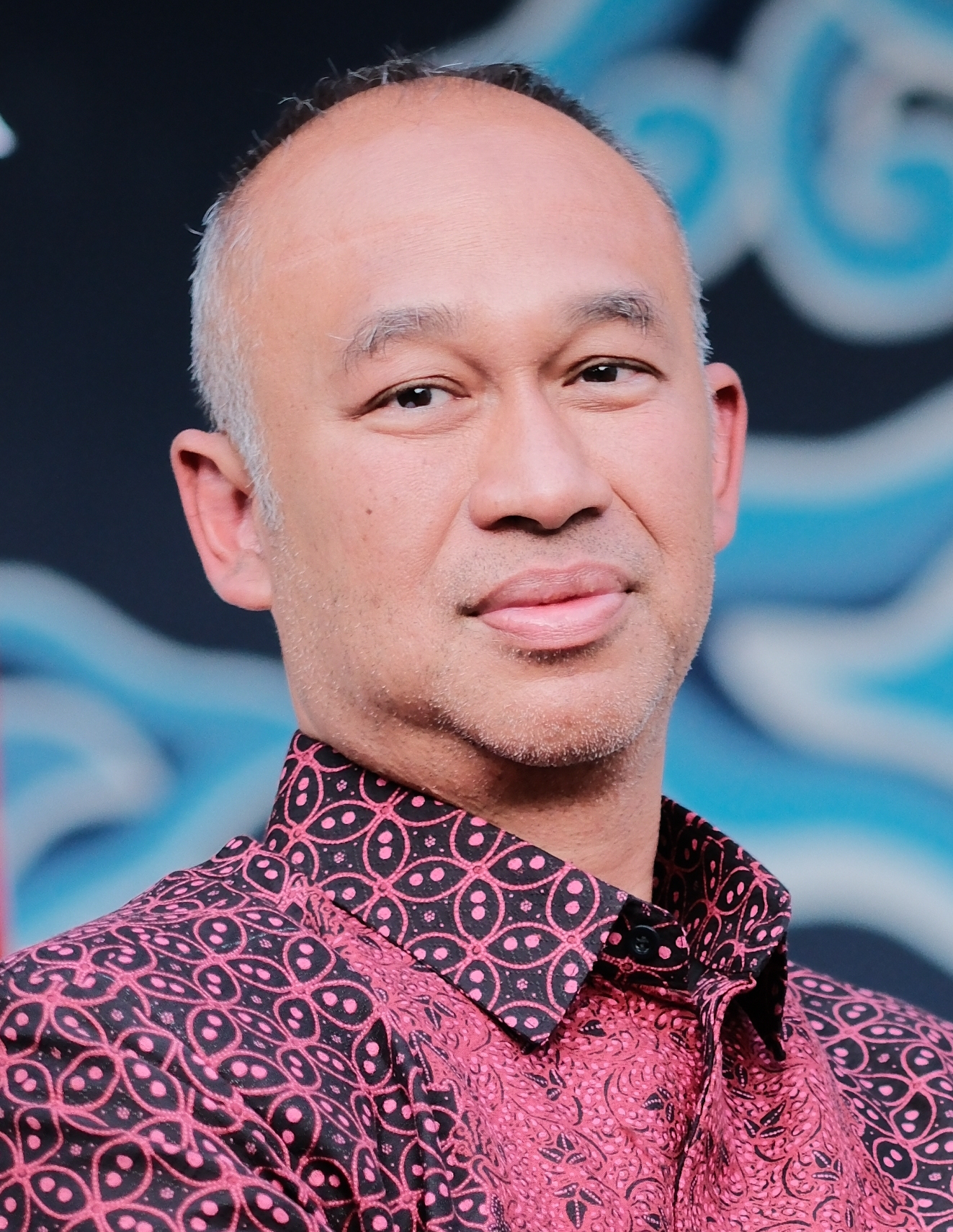

Director General of Protocol and Consular Affairs
- Incumbent
- Assumed office 9 April 2026
- Minister: Sugiono
- Preceded by: Andy Rachmianto

Ambassador of Indonesia to South Africa, Botswana, Eswatini, Lesotho, and the SADC
- In office 26 June 2023 – 31 July 2026
- President: Joko Widodo; Prabowo Subianto
- Preceded by: Salman Al Farisi
- Succeeded by: Freddy Martin Panggabean (CDA)

Personal details
- Born: 12 August 1971 (age 54)
- Spouse: Dyah Prawita
- Children: 3
- Education: Trisakti University

Saud Purwanto Krisnawan (born 12 August 1971) is an Indonesian diplomat who is currently serving aa the foreign ministry's director general of protocol and consular affairs since April 2026. He was the ambassador to South Africa, with concurrent accreditation to Botswana, Eswatini, Lesotho, and the Southern African Development Community from 2023 to 2026 and consul general in Los Angeles from 2019 to 2023.

== Biography ==
Born on 12 August 1971, Saud studied petroleum engineering at the Trisakti University in 1989. He joined the foreign ministry in October 1997. Around 2010, he was assigned at the political section of the embassy in Washington with the rank of first secretary. In early 2019, he was installed as Indonesia's consul general in Los Angeles, receiving his official recognition from the United States Department of State on 18 March 2019. During the George Floyd protests, Saud issued a call for Indonesian citizens in the city to avoid participating in protests and to refrain from posting or signing petitions that criticize U.S. government policies on racial issues or protest management.

In December 2022, Saud was nominated as ambassador to South Africa, with concurrent accreditation to Botswana, Eswatini, Lesotho, and the Southern African Development Community, by President Joko Widodo. After passing an assessment by the house of representative's first commission the next month, he officially assumed office on 26 June 2023. He presented his credentials to the President Cyril Ramaphosa of South Africa on 3 October 2023, President Mokgweetsi Masisi of Botswana on 13 February 2024, King Letsie III of Lesotho on 1 August 2024, and King Mswati III of Eswatini on 8 August 2024. During his tenure, the President of Indonesia Joko Widodo visited South Africa in 2023 to attend the BRICS summit and the embassy celebrated the 30th anniversary of Indonesia–South Africa relations in 2024.

On 9 April 2026, Saud was installed as the director general of protocol and consular affairs. Saud relinquished his ambassadorial office on 31 July 2026, with the embassy's principal deputy chief of mission (the embassy doesn't have a diplomat formally designated as the deputy chief of mission) Freddy Martin Panggabean acting as charge d'affaires ad interim. Before his departure, Saud conducted courtesy calls with South Africa's foreign minister Ronald Lamola on 15 July and King Mswati III of Eswatini on 16 July.

== Personal life ==
Saud is married to Dyah Prawita and has three children.
