= Sutedja =

Sutedja or Suteja is a given name and surname. People with the name include:

== Given name ==
- Sutedja Kartawidjaja

== Surname ==
- Anak Agung Bagus Suteja
- Joice Sutedja
