= Derry Aman =

Indonesian diplomat (born 1971)

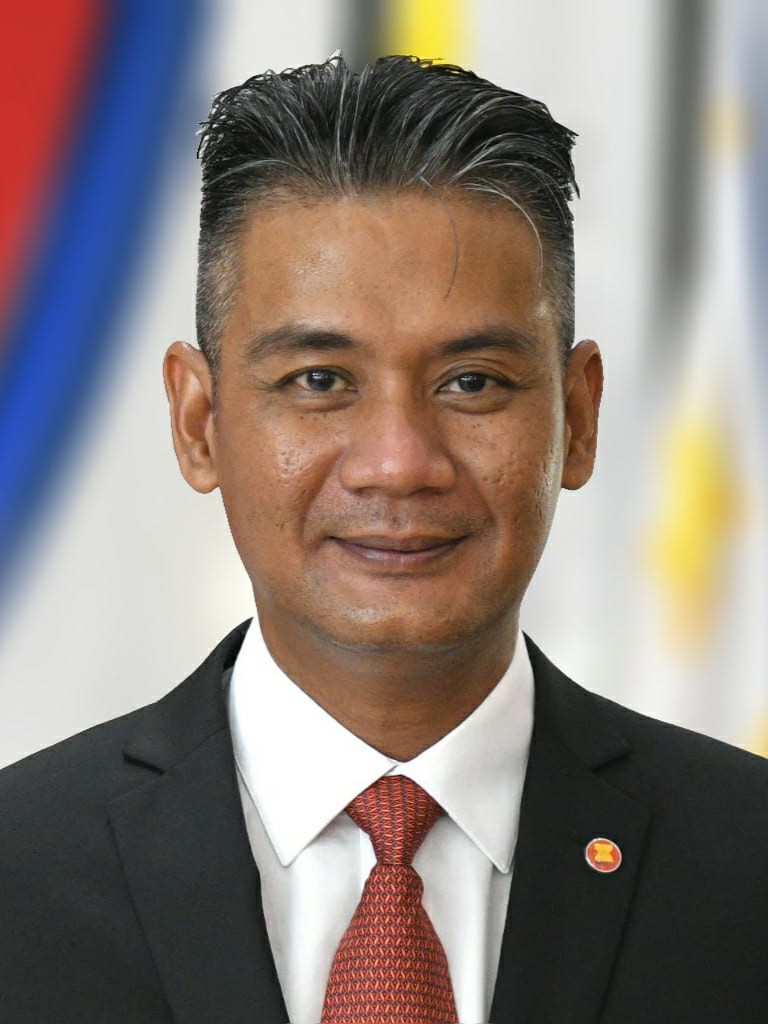

Permanent Representative of Indonesia to ASEAN
- Incumbent
- Assumed office 25 October 2021
- Preceded by: Ade Padmo Sarwono

Personal details
- Born: 16 January 1971 (age 55) Jakarta, Indonesia
- Spouse: Penny Dewi Herasati
- Children: 3
- Parents: Dalindra Aman (father); Asdanila Anis Sjarief (mother)
- Education: Brawijaya University

Mohammad Iskandarsyah Derry Aman (born 16 January 1971) is an Indonesian diplomat who is currently serving as the permanent representative of Indonesia to ASEAN since 2021. Previously, he was the director for dialogue partners and interregional affairs within the ASEAN directorate general and the deputy chief of mission at the embassy in Canberra.

== Early life and education ==
Derry was born in Jakarta on 16 January 1971 as the third of four children of Dalindra Aman, a career diplomat and former ambassador to Kenya, and Asdanila Anis Sjarief. He completed his education in development economics at the Brawijaya University in 1993 before joining the foreign ministry a year later.

== Diplomatic career ==
Upon completing basic diplomat training, Dery began his career in the foreign ministry at the directorate of multilateral economic cooperation from 1995 to 1999. He was then sent abroad for his first overseas assignment, serving at the embassy in Ottawa. He served at the political section of the embassy with the rank of third secretary and was later re-assigned to the protocol and consular section with the rank of second secretary. In 2003, he attended the foreign ministry's mid-level diplomatic training.

From 2005 to 2009, he was posted to the permanent mission to the United Nations in Geneva with the rank of second secretary, and later first secretary. At the permanent mission, he handled issues related to the World Trade Organization (WTO) and international trade. During this time, he chaired the technical level of the G-33 on agriculture negotiations during the WTO Doha Development Round from 2007 to 2009.

Following his assignment in Geneva, Aman was assigned to ASEAN-related posts. After completing senior diplomatic training in 2009, he was appointed as the deputy director (chief of subdirectorate) of ASEAN political cooperation within the ASEAN cooperation directorate general. In this capacity, he was involved in Indonesia's ASEAN chairmanship in 2011, and actively participated in discussion relating to the implementation of ASEAN as a nuclear-free zone during the summit.

In September 2012, Derry received additional duties as the acting director for dialogue partners and interregional affairs, before being permanently appointed to the post on 10 January 2014. At the time of his appointment, he was one of the youngest director in the ministry. He was responsible for managing ASEAN's external relations, particularly through ASEAN-led mechanisms such as ASEAN+1, ASEAN+3, and the East Asia Summit. He argued that ASEAN's dialogue partners are important to ensure ASEAN's existence as a driving force in regional cooperation and benefit from geopolitical and geoeconomic development. Derry has pushed several initiatives to handle ASEAN's growing amount of dialogue partners, notably by streamlining ASEAN meetings to reduce its meetings without sacrificing efficiency and pushing forward the abolition of moratorium for dialogue partners. Derry also voiced his support for Timor Leste's membership within ASEAN.

Derry became the deputy chief of mission of the embassy in Canberra in September 2016. During his tenure, he served as the chargé d'affaires ad interim for a few months in 2017 between the departure of ambassador Nadjib Riphat Kesoema and the arrival of Yohanes Kristiarto Soeryo Legowo.

In February 2021, Derry was nominated as Indonesia's permanent representative to ASEAN. After passing the House of Representatives assessment in July, he was installed on 25 October 2021. He presented his credentials to the Secretary-General of ASEAN Kao Kim Hourn on 3 December that year.

On 10 August 2026, Derry was nominated by President Prabowo Subianto as ambassador to Poland. He underwent a parliamentary vetting process by the House of Representative's first commission on 23 September 2026.

== Personal life ==
Derry is married to Penny Dewi Herasati, Indonesia's current ambassador to Hungary, and has three children. The couple met while undertaking their basic diplomat course together in 1994.
