= Kartawidjaja =

Kartawidjaja is a surname. Notable people with the surname include:

- Djuanda Kartawidjaja (1911–1963), Indonesian politician and technocrat
- Sutedja Kartawidjaja (born 1934), Indonesian diplomat
