= Suryo =

Suryo is an Indonesian name. Notable people with the name include:

- Atmono Suryo (1925–2016), Indonesian diplomat
- Suryo Nugroho (born 1995), Indonesian badminton player
- Suryo Agung Wibowo (born 1983), Indonesian sprinter
- Roy Suryo (born 1968), Indonesian government minister
- Soerjo may also be spelled as Suryo
