= Embassy of Indonesia, Pretoria =

Embassy of the Republic of Indonesia in Pretoria Kedutaan Besar Republik Indonesia di Pretoria

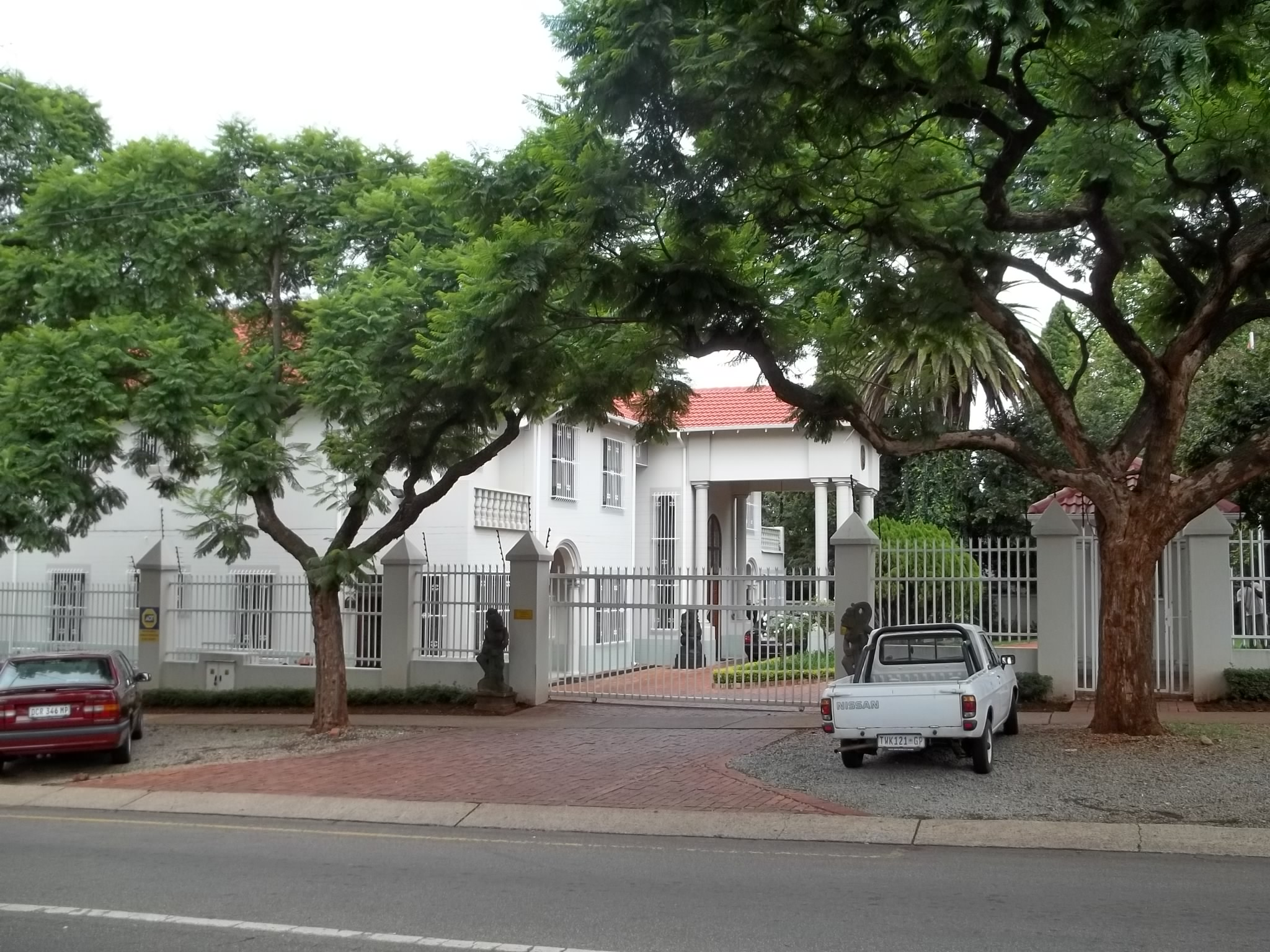
- Location: Pretoria, South Africa
- Address: 949 Francis Baard, Arcadia; Pretoria, 0007, South Africa
- Coordinates: 25.747149°S 28.227077°E
- Ambassador: Salman Al Farisi
- Jurisdiction: South Africa; Botswana; Eswatini; Lesotho
- Website: kemlu.go.id/pretoria/en/

The Embassy of the Republic of Indonesia in Pretoria (Indonesian: Kedutaan Besar Republik Indonesia di Pretoria) is the diplomatic mission of the Republic of Indonesia to the Republic of South Africa and concurrently accredited to the Republic of Botswana, the Kingdom of Eswatini, and the Kingdom of Lesotho. The embassy is located at 949 Francis Baard Street (formerly named Schoeman Street) in the suburb of Arcadia, Pretoria. Indonesia also has a consulate general in Cape Town and an honorary consulate in Mbabane, Eswatini.

The first Indonesian ambassador to South Africa was Rahadi Iskandar (1995–1998). The current ambassador, Salman Al Farisi, was appointed by President Joko Widodo on 2 May 2018.

== History ==
Diplomatic relations between Indonesia and South Africa were established on 12 August 1994 with the signing of a communique by the respective permanent representatives to the United Nations. Prior to this, Indonesia had opened a liaison office (the Liaison Office of the Republic of Indonesia) in Pretoria on 10 February 1994. With the signing of the communique in August 1994, the status of the liaison office changed to embassy status. Rahadi Iskandar, as the first Indonesian ambassador to South Africa, presented his credentials to President Nelson Mandela on 23 May 1995.

== Gallery ==
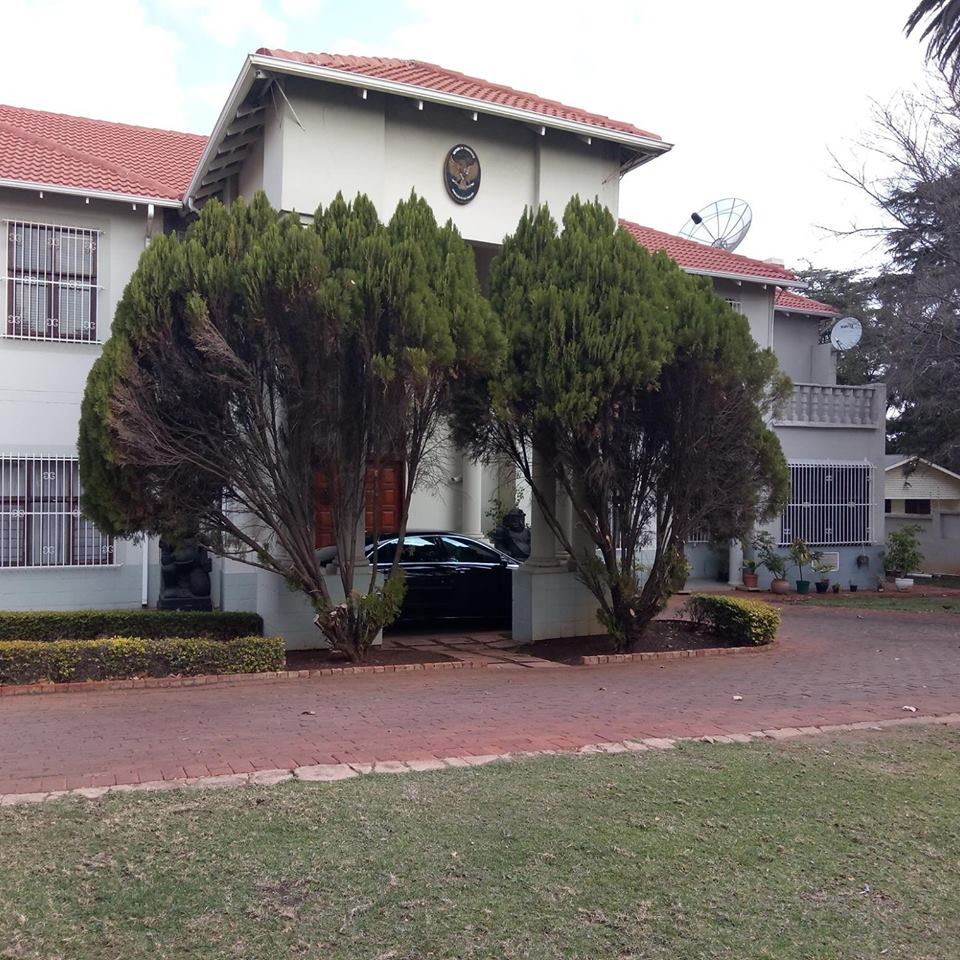
Chancery at 949 Francis Baard Street

== See also ==
- Indonesia–South Africa relations
- List of diplomatic missions of Indonesia
- List of diplomatic missions in South Africa
