= Rodolfo Severino Jr. =

Filipino diplomat (1936–2019)

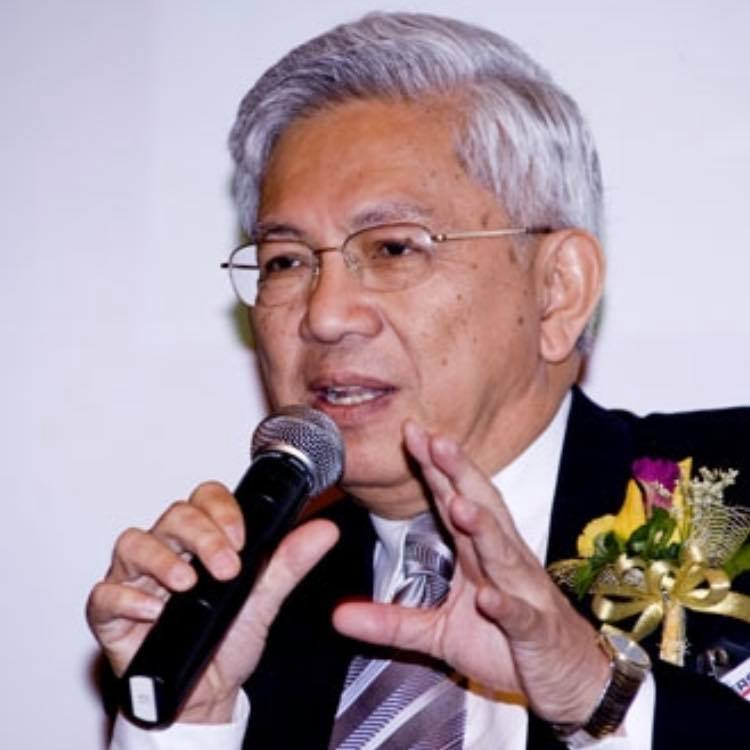

10th Secretary General of ASEAN
- In office 1 January 1998 – 31 December 2002
- Preceded by: Ajit Singh
- Succeeded by: Ong Keng Yong

Personal details
- Born: 27 April 1936 Manila, Philippines
- Died: 19 April 2019 (aged 82) Manila, Philippines
- Resting place: Libingan ng mga Bayani
- Children: Howie Severino
- Education: Ateneo de Manila University; Johns Hopkins School of Advanced International Studies
- Occupation: Diplomat

Rodolfo Certeza Severino Jr. (27 April 1936 – 19 April 2019) was a Filipino diplomat who served as the tenth secretary-general of ASEAN between 1998 and 2002.

== Career ==
He was the inaugural head of the ASEAN Studies Centre (ASC) at the ISEAS-Yusof Ishak Institute in Singapore from 2008 to 2015, and was an adjunct professor at the Lee Kuan Yew School of Public Policy, National University of Singapore until 2015. He was an associate senior fellow affiliated with the ASC at the ISEAS-Yusof Ishak Institute. He is the author of four books: Southeast Asia in Search of an ASEAN Community (2006), ASEAN (2008), The ASEAN Regional Forum (2009) and Where in the World is the Philippines? (2010). He is also the co-editor of Whither the Philippines in the 21st Century? (2007), among other collections.

He studied at Ateneo de Manila University and held a post-graduate degree in international studies from the Johns Hopkins School of Advanced International Studies.

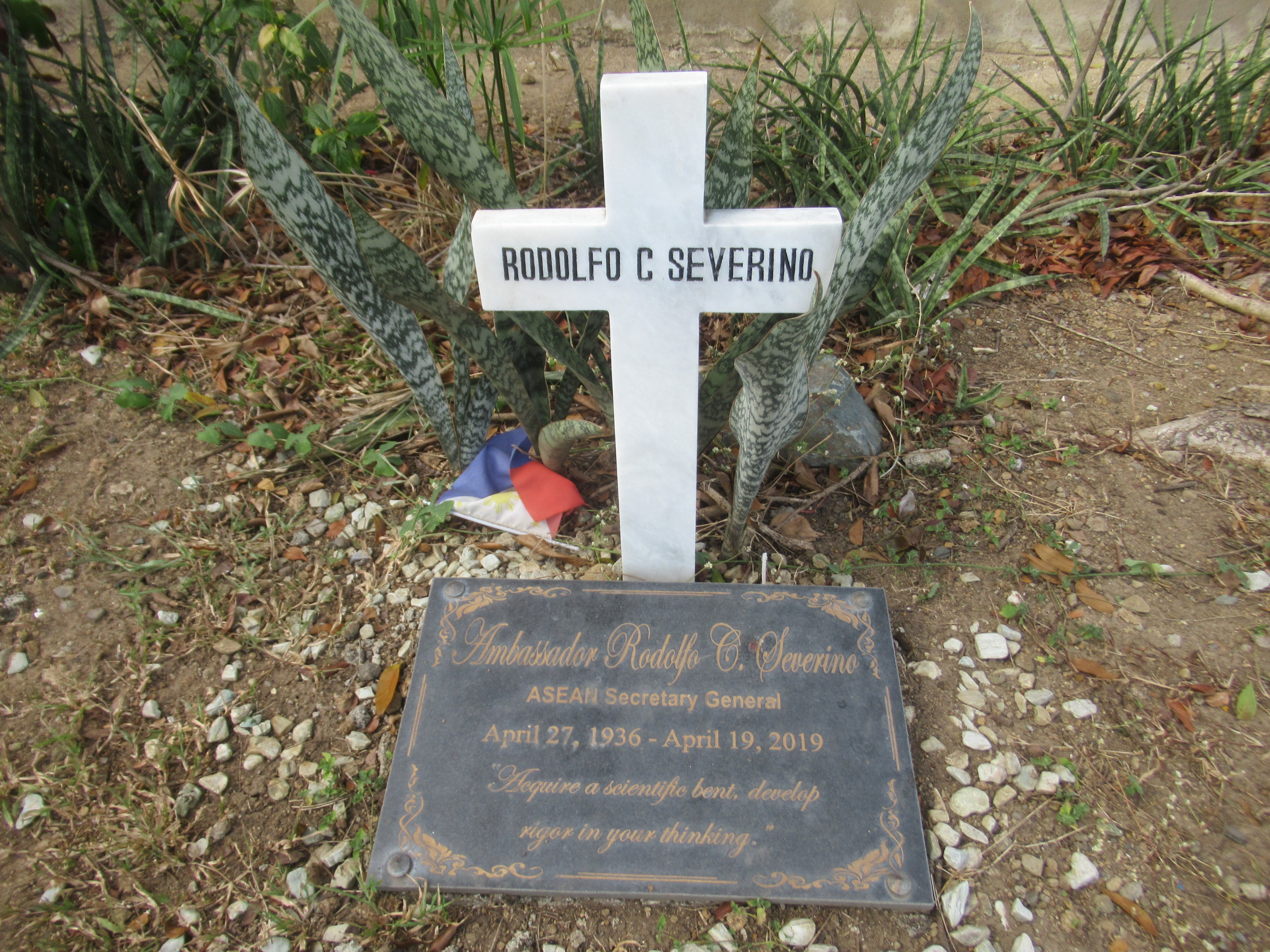
Severino, Jr's grave at the Libingan ng mga Bayani.

He previously held the following positions

- Third, second, and first secretary, Philippine Embassy in Washington, D.C. (1967–1974)
- Special assistant to the undersecretary of foreign affairs, Foreign Affairs (1974–1976)
- Minister-counsellor and chargé d'affaires, Philippine Embassy in Beijing (1976–1979)
- Consul general, Philippine Consulate General in Houston, Texas (1979–1986)
- Assistant secretary for Asian and Pacific affairs and ASEAN senior official of the Philippines(1986–1988)
- Ambassador extraordinary and plenipotentiary to Malaysia (1989–1992)
- Undersecretary of foreign affairs and ASEAN senior official of the Philippines (1992–1997)
- Professor, Asian Institute of Management, Manila, the Philippines (2003–2004)
- Visiting research fellow, ISEAS, Singapore, Singapore (2005–2008)

Severino died of complications from Parkinson's disease on 19 April 2019, eight days before his 83rd birthday.

== Awards ==
- 1997 – Order of Sikatuna, rank of Datu, from President Fidel V. Ramos of the Philippines
- 2001 – Order of Sikatuna, rank of Rajah, from President Gloria Macapagal Arroyo of the Philippines, one of only two non-heads of state to receive the award in that rank
- 2002 – commander of the Royal Order of Sahametrei, from King Norodom Sihanouk of Cambodia
- 2017 – Order of Lakandula, rank of Supremo, from President Rodrigo Duterte of the Philippines (posthumous)

Political offices
Preceded by Ajit Singh	Secretary-General of ASEAN; 1998–2002	Succeeded by Ong Keng Yong
Incumbent
