= Phan Wannamethee =

Thai diplomat and author (born 1924)

- แผน วรรณเมธี
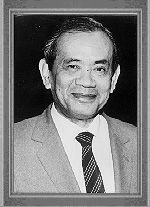
- Wannamethee in 1984

6th Secretary General of ASEAN
- In office 16 July 1984 – 15 July 1986
- Preceded by: Chan Kai Yau
- Succeeded by: Roderick Yong

Personal details
- Born: 30 January 1923 (age 103) Bangkok, Thailand
- Spouse: Hiranyika Ladawan
- Education: Oberlin College; University of California, Berkeley
- Occupation: Diplomat

Phan Wannamethee (born 30 January 1923) is a Thai diplomat who served as the sixth secretary-general of ASEAN between 1984 and 1986.

== Education ==
Phan Wannamethee graduated from Oberlin College with a bachelor's degree in history and a master's degree in international relations from the University of California, Berkeley.

== Secretary-General of ASEAN ==
As Secretary-General of the Association of Southeast Asian Nations (ASEAN), he played an important role and is behind the draft of the Treaty of Amity and Cooperation in Southeast Asia.

== Thai Red Cross Society ==
Phan was former Secretary-General of the Thai Red Cross Society until resigning from the position in 2021.

== Royal decorations ==
- Knight Grand Cross (First Class) of The Most Illustrious Order of Chula Chom Klao
- Knight Grand Cordon (Special Class) of The Most Exalted Order of the White Elephant
- Knight Grand Cordon (Special Class) of The Most Noble Order of the Crown of Thailand
- Knight Grand Cross (First Class) of The Most Admirable Order of the Direkgunabhorn
- Chakrabarti Mala Medal
- First Class of Boy Scout Citation Medal of Vajira

Political offices
Preceded by Chan Kai Yau	Secretary–General of ASEAN; 1984–1986	Succeeded by Roderick Yong
