= Penny Dewi Herasati =

Indonesian diplomat (born 1968)

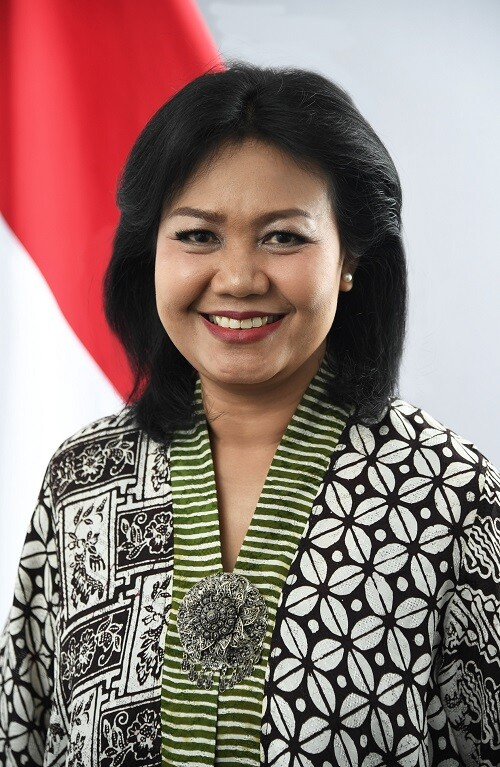

Ambassador of Indonesia to Hungary
- Incumbent
- Assumed office 24 March 2025
- Preceded by: Dimas Wahab

Personal details
- Born: 2 February 1968 (age 57) Jakarta, Indonesia
- Spouse: Derry Aman
- Children: 3
- Parents: Djuwaher Soediharja (father); Ferial Ningrati (mother)
- Education: University of Canberra

Penny Dewi Herasati (born 2 February 1968) is an Indonesian diplomat who is currently serving as ambassador to Hungary since 2025. She was previously the director for social, cultural, and international organizations of developing countries within the foreign ministry.

== Career ==
Penny was born on 2 February 1968 as the daughter of Djuwaher Soediharja, a retired navy colonel, and Ferial Ningrati. She joined the foreign ministry in March 1994. By 1999, she was assigned to the economic section of permanent representative to the United Nations in New York with the rank of third secretary. In 2002, she was elected to the Main Committee of the Second World Assembly on Ageing as a vice chairperson, representing the group of Asian Nations. She was then posted as the chief of political section of the embassy in Bern, serving with the rank of first secretary. Sometime in the 2010s, she became a deputy director (chief of subdirectorate) with the foreign department's Directorate for Trade, Industry, Investment, and Intellectual Property Rights.

By 2015, Penny was posted to the economic section at the embassy in Bangkok with the rank of minister counsellor. During her posting, Penny published an opinion piece at Thailand's The Nation that defended Indonesia's decision to execute the ringleaders of the Bali Nine, stating that Indonesia is experiencing a severe drug emergency with the rise of abuse cases, and that the executions are carried out only after all legal avenues, including presidential pardons, have been exhausted. John Patterson later questioned the credibility of the statistics given by Penny to prove the rise of abuse case and stated that "any moral high ground has been swept from beneath Ms Herasati and her president".

After serving in Bangkok, Penny followed her husband's posting as deputy chief of mission in Australia, where she became the deputy chairwomen of the embassy's wives union. She also pursued master's degree in strategic communication at the University of Canberra.

Upon completing her studies, she was installed as the director for social, cultural, and international organizations of developing countries on 6 October 2020. Penny played a role in Indonesia's vaccine diplomacy, as the country competed with India and South Korea to qualify as a regional hub for COVID-19 vaccination training and mRNA knowledge transfer in the Asia-Pacific. Indonesia also reached for help to other countries to secure vaccines through diplomacy, with South Korea and Japan being the first to send assistance, and followed by China with 439 million vaccine doses through bilateral deals, Covax, and donations. Outside handling COVID-19 matters, Penny became the co-chair of the Indonesia-UN Consultative Forum working group.

In August 2024, President Joko Widodo nominated Penny as Indonesia's ambassador to Hungary. She passed a fit and proper test held by the House of Representative's first commission in September that year and was installed by President Prabowo Subianto on 24 March 2025. Penny arrived in Hungary on 26 June 2025 and received her duties from chargé d'affaires ad interim four days later. In August 2025, Penny visited Győr to explore the possibility of sister city with cities Indonesia, especially in fields such as water management. She presented her credentials to the President of Hungary Tamás Sulyok on 23 September 2025.

== Personal life ==
Penny is married to Derry Aman, Indonesia's current permanent representative to ASEAN, and has three children. The couple met while undertaking their basic diplomat course together in 1994.
