= Chan Kai Yau =

5th Secretary-General of ASEAN

Chan Kai Yau PPA PBS JP
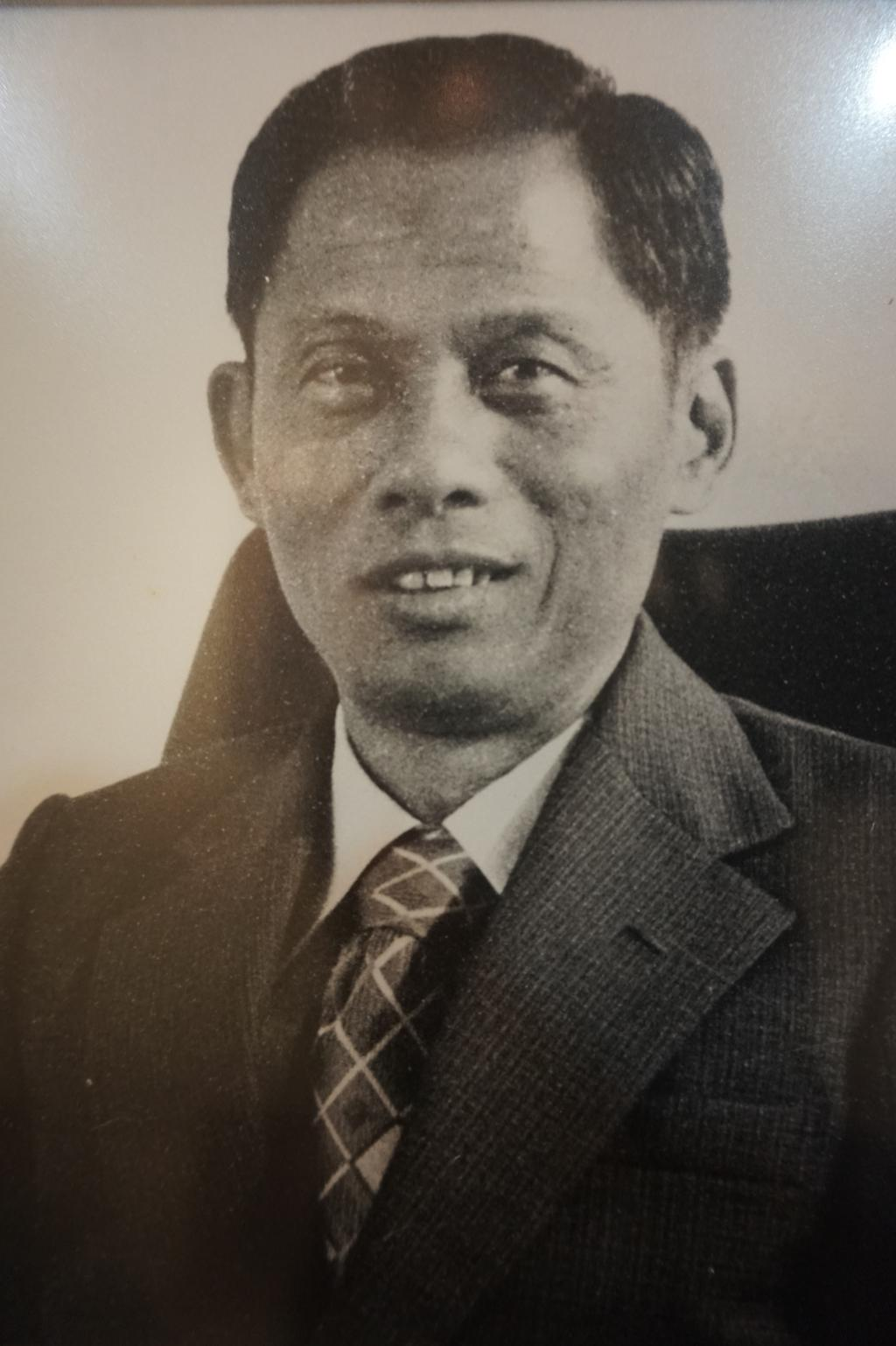
- Chan in 1983

5th Secretary-General of ASEAN
- In office 1982–1984
- Preceded by: Narciso G. Reyes
- Succeeded by: Phan Wannamethee

Personal details
- Born: November 19, 1930 Hong Kong
- Died: June 6, 2025 (aged 94) Singapore
- Education: University of Malaya, University of Sydney
- Occupation: Educator, diplomat, civil servant

Chan Kai Yau PPA PBS JP (19 November 1930 – 6 June 2025) was a Singaporean educator, civil servant, and diplomat. He was Director of Education from 1975 to 1982 and later the first Singaporean to serve as Secretary-General of ASEAN from 1982 to 1984.

== Early life and education ==
Chan was born in Hong Kong on 19 November 1930. His family moved to Penang, Malaya before the Second World War where he attended Chung Ling High School. Following the war, he studied mathematics at the University of Malaya and later received a Colombo Plan scholarship to study a Master of Mathematical Statistics from the University of Sydney in Australia.

== Career ==
=== Education Service (1955–1982) ===
Chan began his career as a teacher at Beatty Secondary School in 1955, before becoming a lecturer at the Teachers' Training College in 1961. He later held various positions in the ministry before being appointed Director of Education from 1975 to 1982. During his tenure at the ministry, he worked to review the national education curriculum, including Singapore's bilingual education policy and the establishment of the Junior College system in Singapore.

=== ASEAN Secretary-General (1982–1984) ===
After his tenure at the Ministry of Education, Chan was nominated by the Singapore government to become the first Singaporean to hold the appointment of Secretary-General of the Association of Southeast Asian Nations. On 18 July 1982, he succeeded Narciso G. Reyes in Jakarta, becoming the 5th Secretary General of ASEAN. His work at ASEAN focused on fostering trade and investment between the member states, and further developing the scope and capabilities of the ASEAN Secretariat.

=== Later life ===
After his term at ASEAN, Chan returned to Singapore and was appointed executive director of the Singapore Chinese Chamber of Commerce and Industry from 1985 to 1987, and later became Chairman of the Singapore Red Cross Society in 1988. In 1989, he was appointed a Justice of the Peace by President Wee Kim Wee.

== Personal life ==
Chan was married and had two sons and a daughter, along with five grandchildren and two great-grandchildren. He was a lifelong Christian and was an active member of the Methodist Church in Singapore. Chan died from natural causes on 6 June 2025, aged 94.

== Awards ==
Chan received the following awards during his career:

- Pingat Pentadbiran Awam (Perak) – Public Administration Medal (Silver)
- Pingat Bakti Setia – Long Service Medal

== See also ==
- Association of Southeast Asian Nations
- Education in Singapore
