= Sutedja Kartawidjaja =

Indonesian diplomat (born 1934)

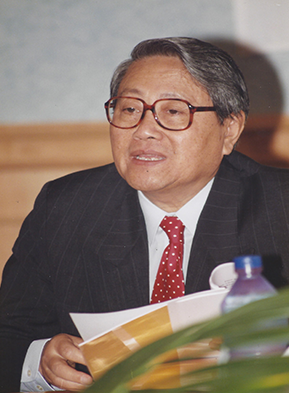

Indonesian Ambassador to Zimbabwe, Mozambique, and Swaziland
- In office October 1993 – 1997
- Preceded by: Syamsi Abdulla
- Succeeded by: Syaiful Amanullah

Personal details
- Born: August 31, 1934 (age 92) Bandung, West Java, Netherlands East Indies
- Children: 3
- Education: Foreign Service Academy; Gadjah Mada University; Durham University; University of Michigan; University of Pittsburgh

Sutedja Kartawidjaja (born 31 August 1934) is an Indonesian diplomat who was the ambassador to Zimbabwe from 1993 to 1997. Previously, he was a director in the ASEAN national secretariat and spokesperson for Indonesia's foreign department.

== Early life and education ==
Sutedja Kartawidjaja was born on 31 August 1934, in Bandung, West Java. Upon completing Foreign Service Academy in 1957, he continued his education in international relations at the Gadjah Mada University, and graduated with a doctorandus in 1959. Throughout his service abroad, he studied in a number of colleges abroad, including in economics at the King's College at Durham University in 1963; University of Michigan in 1971; University of Pittsburgh School of Public and International Affairs in 1973. Sutedja, who is married and has three children, is a Muslim.

== Diplomatic career ==
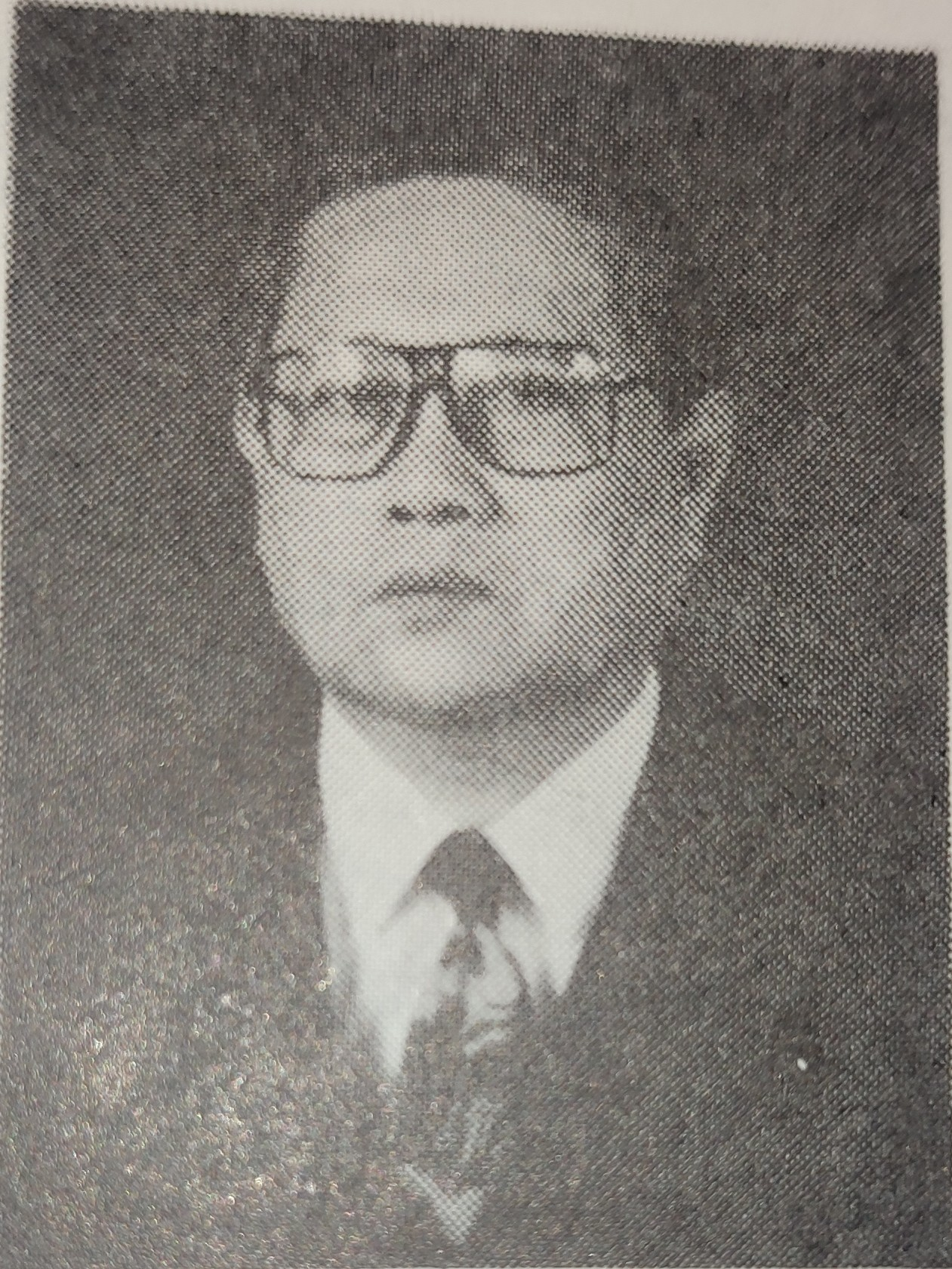
Sutedja Kartawidjaja

Sutedja Kartawidjaja joined the foreign department in 1957. After a brief period from 1964 to 1971 working in the private sector, he returned to regional affairs and served as the chief of general affairs at the ASEAN national secretariat from 1972 to 1974. His overseas diplomatic assignments began in 1974 when he was posted to the consulate general in San Francisco as vice consul with the diplomatic rank of third secretary. He received a promotion to second secretary in 1975 and was further elevated as consul, with the diplomatic rank of first secretary, in 1978.

Upon returning to Jakarta, Sutedja was appointed as the chief of program and legal affairs within the secretariat of the directorate general for foreign economic and socio-cultural relations, a position he held from 1979 to 1982. He was then sent to Canada as the consul in Toronto, Ontario, with the rank of counsellor from 1982 to 1985. He then attended senior diplomatic education from 1985 to 1986. Upon completion, from 1986 to 1987, he was posted locally as the chief of economic and technical bureau cooperation, serving under the assistant for foreign politics to the coordinating minister for politics and security.

Sutedja was appointed to the ASEAN secretariat general as director of economic bureau in 1987, during the term of secretary-general Roderick Yong. After Yong was replaced by Rusli Noor of Indonesia, Sutedja's portfolio was shifted to director of the first bureau, which is responsible for managing ASEAN's presence in COTT, COIME, COFAB, COTAC, ASEAN-Japan Dialogue, ASEAN-US Dialogue, and future sectoral cooperation with third countries and International Organizations. His three-year stint in the ASEAN secretariat ended in 1990 with his appointment as director of foreign information, designated as the foreign department's spokesperson.

On 21 October 1993, Sutedja was sworn into office as ambassador to Zimbabwe, with concurrent accreditation to Mozambique and Eswatini. He stepped down from his directorship and was replaced by Irawan Abidin on 25 November the same year. In light of Indonesia's chairmanship of the Non-Aligned Movement around the time of his ambassadorship, Sutedja led a mission to supervise South Africa's first multiracial elections in 1994. As ambassador, Sutedja on behalf of the Indonesian government provided US$750,000 to support Zimbabwe's hosting of the World Solar Summit, and invited Indonesian construction company Citra Marga Nusaphala Persada to take part in the construction of the Johannesburg-Maputo highway in 1996.
