= Ade Padmo Sarwono =

Indonesian career diplomat (born 1962)

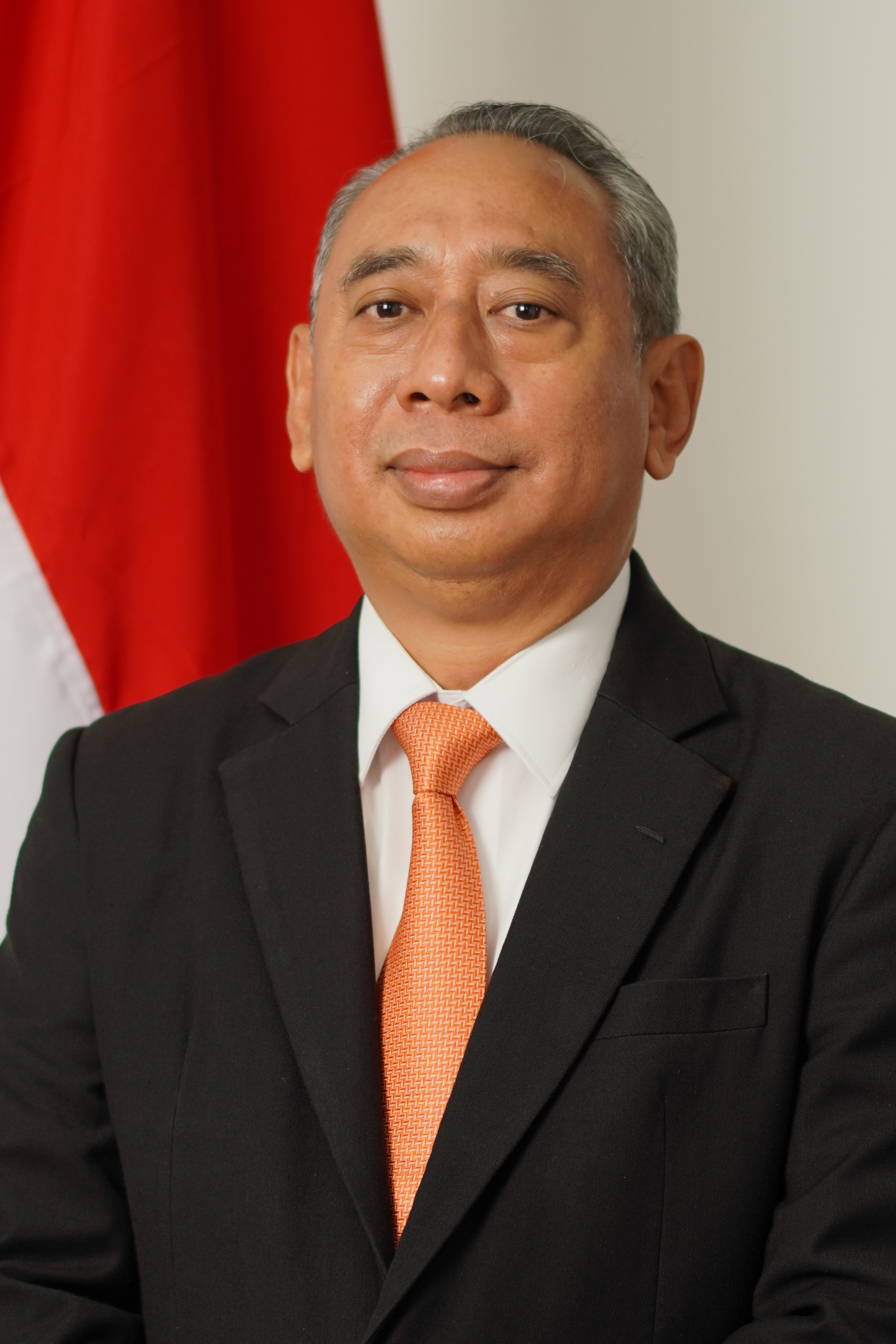

Ambassador of Indonesia to Jordan and Palestine
- Incumbent
- Assumed office 25 October 2021
- President: Joko Widodo; Prabowo Subianto
- Preceded by: Andy Rachmianto

Permanent Representative of Indonesia to ASEAN
- In office 20 February 2018 – 25 October 2021
- President: Joko Widodo
- Preceded by: Rahmat Pramono
- Succeeded by: Derry Aman

Personal details
- Born: 31 March 1962 (age 64) Jakarta, Indonesia
- Education: University of Indonesia (S.Sos); International University of Japan (MA)

Ade Padmo Sarwono (born 31 March 1962) is an Indonesia diplomat who is currently serving as Indonesia's ambassador to Jordan and Palestine, serving since 25 October 2021. Prior to his current office, he held a number of diplomatic positions, including as ambassador to ASEAN from 2018 to 2021.

== Early life and education ==
Ade Padmo Sarwono was born on 31 March 1962 in Jakarta as the son of Padmo Soemasto, a lawyer and former chairman of the Badminton Association of Indonesia, and Siti Poedjani, a teacher. As a child, he grew up with an affinity for languages. He studied international relations since 1981 at the University of Indonesia and graduated in 1988. He continued his studies in Japan, where he pursued his master's studies in international affairs at the International University of Japan from 1992 to 1994.

== Diplomatic career ==
Ade's career in public service began in March 1989 shortly after obtaining his undergraduate degree. Upon completing his junior diplomatic education in 1989, from 1990 to 1992 he served as a staff in the directorate of diplomatic facilities. His career progressed significantly after he completed his master's degree. From 1994 to 1995, he held the position of acting chief of regional cooperation section within the Asia and Pacific Directorate. Subsequently, from August 1995 to April 1999, he was appointed as third secretary, and later second secretary at the political section of the embassy in Pretoria, South Africa.

Upon his return to Indonesia in 1999, he completed his mid-level diplomatic training on the same year, and became the chief of human rights section in the directorate of international organizations, a role he held until 2001. As section chief, he played a role in Working Group on Human Rights Action Plan 1998-2004. From 2001 to 2005, Ade served as second secretary, and later first secretary, at the permanent mission to the UN and other international organizations in Geneva, where he headed the political section. He then transitioned to the role of deputy director (chief of subdirectorate) for ASEAN political security cooperation from 2005 to 2009. During this period, Ade undertook senior diplomatic education in 2007 and was involved in ASEAN processes as an assistant on the Eminent Persons Group on the ASEAN Charter in Indonesia (2005-2006) and the High Level Panel on an ASEAN Human Rights Body in 2008. After the post was upgraded to a director-level post in 2009, Ade became the acting director of ASEAN political security cooperation, before permanently assuming the post until 2012. In 2011, Ade organized a disaster preparedness exercise in North Sulawesi following the Tōhoku earthquake and tsunami on the same year. During this period, he chaired the Working Group on Counter-Terrorism ASEAN SOM Transnational Crimes.

In 2012, Ade was entrusted with the role of consul in Darwin, a position he held until 2014. He continued his diplomatic service in Australia for the next three years, serving as consul general in Perth from 2014 to 2017. After a brief two-month period as a high ranking employee at the Ministry of Foreign Affairs upon his return to Indonesia, in October 2017 Ade was nominated by President Joko Widodo as permanent representative to ASEAN. Upon passing an assessment by the House of Representatives, on 20 February 2018 he was installed as ambassador. He presented his credentials to ASEAN Secretary General Lim Jock Hoi on 2 April that year.

In February 2021, Ade was nominated as ambassador of Indonesia to Jordan and Palestine. After passing the House of Representatives assessment in July, he was installed on 25 October 2021. He presented his credentials to Abdullah II of Jordan on 6 March 2022 and to Palestine President Mahmoud Abbas on 1 March 2023.
