= Nils Thedin =

Swedish businessman and civic leader

Chairman of UNICEF
- In office 1970–1972
- Preceded by: İhsan Doğramacı
- Succeeded by: Narciso G. Reyes

Nils Emil Thedin (10 March 1911 in Stockholm – 1 February 1989) was a Swedish businessman and civic leader.

== Education ==
Nils Thedin qualified in philosophy in 1934, then worked as a teacher at Vårgårda 1935-1937.

== Kooperativa Förbundet ==
Thedin then secured a position at the International Labor Office in Geneva 1937-1939, then became a member of the Kooperativa Förbundet's (KF) secretariat 1940-1944, editor-in-chief of the organisation's magazine Vi magazine1945-1959, deputy head of KF's organizational department 1958 –1969 and head of KF's publicity department 1963–1969.

== International service ==
From 1951 and from 1947 he was Vice President of the Swedish branch of Save the Children International, then was a board member of the International Cooperative Alliance 1947–1981, concurrently serving as Chairman of UNICEF at the international level from 1970 to 1972.

Thedin joined the board of the Swedish International Development Cooperation Agency in 1963 and was Chairman of the publishing company Liber from 1964. He was also Chairman of Sveriges Radio from 1967, chairman of the Correspondence School 1969–1976, for the board of the East Asian Museum 1970–1977, for the Swedish Handicrafts Association 1968–1970, for the Swedish Coop Center 1976–1978, vice-chairman of the Norwegian State Museums of Art 1977–1979, International Union for Child Welfare 1977–1978, chairman of the working committee for International children's year 1978–1979, and project manager for the International Labor Office in Bangkok 1979 -1984.

== Publications ==
Thedin published Råvaruproblemet och freden ('Commodities: The problem in peacetime') in 1944, and Inlägg. Ledare, porträtt och reseskisser utgivna till författarens femtioårsdag den 10 mars 1961 ('Posts. Editorials, portraits and travel sketches issued for the author's fiftieth birthday, 10 March 1961') in 1961.

== Awards ==
Thedin was awarded the Illis quorum in 1986 for "long-standing and significant efforts for the world's children".

== Personal life ==
Nils Thedin married Carin Eberstein, daughter of Gösta Eberstein, in 1942.
