= Ong Keng Yong =

Singaporean diplomat (born 1954)

Ong Keng Yong PPA PBS PJG
- 王景荣
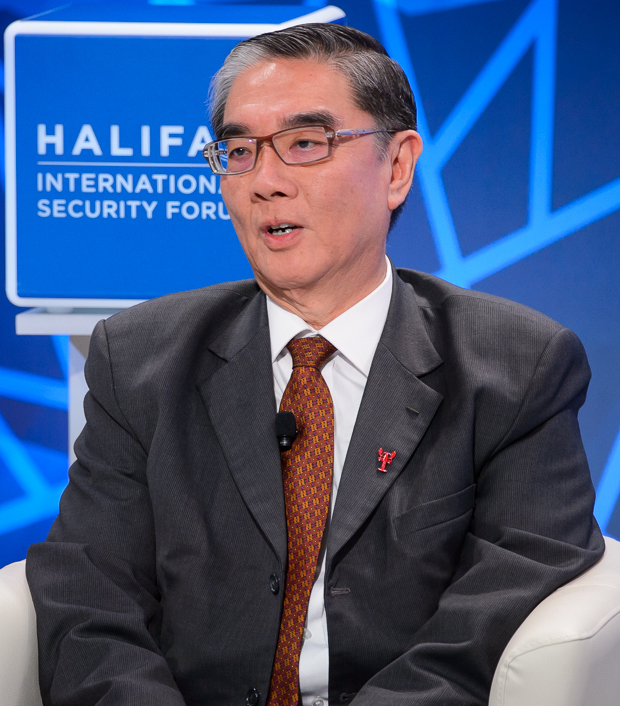
- Ong in 2017

11th Secretary-General of ASEAN
- In office 1 January 2003 – 31 December 2007
- Preceded by: Rodolfo Severino Jr.
- Succeeded by: Surin Pitsuwan

Personal details
- Born: 6 January 1954 (age 72) Colony of Singapore, British Malaya
- Relations: Ong Keng Sen (brother)
- Education: University of Singapore (LLB); Georgetown University (MA)
- Occupation: Diplomat

Ong Keng Yong PPA PBS PJG (born 6 January 1954) is a Singaporean diplomat who served as the 11th secretary-general of ASEAN between 2003 and 2007. He is currently the Executive Deputy Chairman of the S. Rajaratnam School of International Studies at the Nanyang Technological University.

== Education ==
Ong was educated at the Anglo-Chinese School and St Andrew's School before he graduated from the University of Singapore (now the National University of Singapore) in 1979 with a Bachelor of Laws with honours degree. He subsequently went on to complete a Master of Arts degree in Arab studies (with distinction) at Georgetown University.

== Career ==
Ong is Executive Deputy Chairman of the S. Rajaratnam School of International Studies (RSIS) at the Nanyang Technological University in Singapore. He is concurrently Director of the Institute of Defence and Strategic Studies (IDSS) and Head of the International Centre for Political Violence and Terrorism Research (ICPVTR) at RSIS.

Ong continues to hold the position of Ambassador-at-Large at the Singapore Ministry of Foreign Affairs. He is also Singapore’s Non-Resident High Commissioner to Pakistan and Non-Resident Ambassador to Iran. Mr Ong was the Chairman of the Singapore International Foundation (SIF) from 2015 to 2023. Under his charge, the SIF was awarded the Adinata Award for strengthening bilateral ties with Indonesia.

Ong was High Commissioner of Singapore to Malaysia from 2011 to 2014. He served as High Commissioner of Singapore to India and concurrently Singapore’s Ambassador to Nepal from 1996 to 1998.

Ong served as the 11th Secretary-General of ASEAN (Association of Southeast Asian Nations), based in Jakarta, Indonesia, for 5 years from January 2003. In 2025, Ong explained that Asean's effectiveness laid in its informal and loose structure that allows them to work out differences and explore possibilities across a diversity of views.

Ong started his diplomatic career in 1979 and was posted to the Singapore Embassies in Saudi Arabia, Malaysia, and the United States of America between 1984 and 1994. From September 1998 to December 2002, he was Press Secretary to the then Prime Minister of Singapore, Mr Goh Chok Tong, while holding senior appointments in the Ministry of Information, Communications and the Arts, and the People’s Association in Singapore. From 2008 to 2011, he served as Director of the Institute of Policy Studies (IPS) in the Lee Kuan Yew School of Public Policy at the National University of Singapore.

In 2017, in a well-publicised series of exchanges, Ong was one of a few diplomats and politicians who criticised views expressed by former diplomat Kishore Mahbubani in relation to Singapore's foreign policy.

In 2022, then Cambodian Prime Minister Hun Sen took issue with remarks made by Ong in relation to a visit by Hun Sen to Myanmar.

In June 2024, Ong, discussing the 60th anniversary of ASEAN, continued to express optimism about its future, but stressed the need for collaboration in order to advance the prospects of its people.

He is also the chairman of Humanity Matters, a Singapore-based regional intercultural humanitarian non-profit entity that has raised more than $300,000 for the Gaza humanitarian efforts in 2024.

== Awards ==
Ong had received several awards throughout his career. He was awarded the Public Administration Medal (Silver) in 1997, the Long Service Award in 2002 and the Meritorious Service Medal in 2008 by the Singapore Government. He also received the Medal of Friendship from Laos in 2007, and the Medal of Sahametrei from Cambodia in 2007.

Political offices
Preceded by Rodolfo Severino Jr.	Secretary-General of ASEAN; 2003–2007	Succeeded by Surin Pitsuwan
Incumbent
