= Narciso G. Reyes =

Filipino writer (1914–1996)

Narciso Reyes
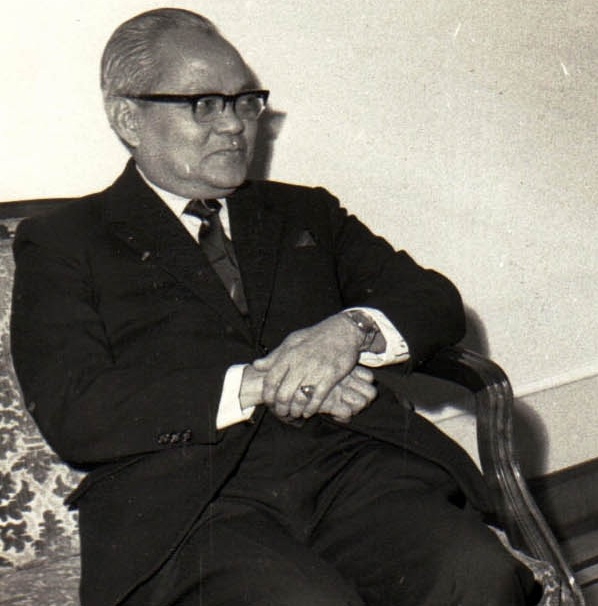

4th Secretary-General of ASEAN
- In office 1 July 1980 – 1 July 1982
- Preceded by: Ali Abdullah
- Succeeded by: Chan Yau Kai

Chairman of UNICEF
- In office 1972–1974
- Preceded by: Nils Thedin
- Succeeded by: Hans Conzett

Ambassador Extraordinary and Plenipotentiary of the Republic of the Philippines to the United Kingdom
- In office 1966–1970
- President: Ferdinand Marcos
- Preceded by: Marcial P. Lichauco
- Succeeded by: Jaime Zóbel de Ayala

Personal details
- Born: 2 February 1914 Tondo, Manila, Philippines
- Died: 7 May 1996 (aged 82) Manila, Philippines

Narciso Gallardo Reyes (2 February 1914 – 7 May 1996) was a Filipino diplomat who served as the fourth secretary-general of ASEAN between 1980 and 1982 and the chairman of UNICEF between 1972 and 1974.

== Career ==
He initially worked as a teacher, journalist and newspaper publisher. In 1948 he joined the civil service and was posted to the Permanent Mission to the United Nations in New York in 1954. He then became Director of the Philippine Information Agency. He was then posted to Thailand and was Ambassador in Burma from 1958 to 1962. In 1962 he became Ambassador to Indonesia. From 1966 to 1970 he served as Ambassador to the United Kingdom. Reyes then became the Permanent Representative to the United Nations in New York. He was Chairman of UNICEF from 1972 to 1974 and President of the United Nations Development Programme (UNDP) 1974. From 1977 to 1982 he was Ambassador to the People's Republic of China. He was Secretary-General of the Association of Southeast Asian Nations from 1980 to 1982.

On July 11, 1994, he was awarded the highest decoration in the Philippine Foreign Service, the Gawad Mabini Award, with the rank of Dakilang Kamanong.

Political offices
Preceded by Ali Abdullah	Secretary–General of ASEAN; 1980–1982	Succeeded by Chan Kai Yau
