= Soerjo =

Soerjo is a part of an Indonesian name. Notable people with the name include:

- Ario Soerjo (1898–1948), Indonesian politician
- Tirto Adhi Soerjo, Indonesian journalist

== See also ==
- Suryo
