= Indonesia–South Africa relations =

- Indonesia: South Africa

Diplomatic mission
- Embassy of Indonesia, Pretoria: Embassy of South Africa, Jakarta

Indonesia and South Africa established formal diplomatic relations on 12 August 1994. The South African Embassy in Jakarta was established in January 1995, and Indonesia opened its embassy in Pretoria later that year. Both nations are members of numerous organizations such as the World Trade Organization (WTO), Non-Aligned Movement, Indian-Ocean Rim Association, Cairns Group, CIVETS, G-20 major economies and BRICS. In 2012, during a briefing on Foreign Policy initiatives for the year, Indonesia named South Africa amongst its 14 strategic partners and Dutch colonial period East Indies overseas countries (including Dutch-speaking countries outside the Kingdom of the Netherlands).

According to a 2013 BBC World Service Poll, Indonesians' perception of South Africa are divided between 36% expressing a negative view, and 33% expressing a positive one, this is about the same as the global average opinion on South Africa.

== History ==
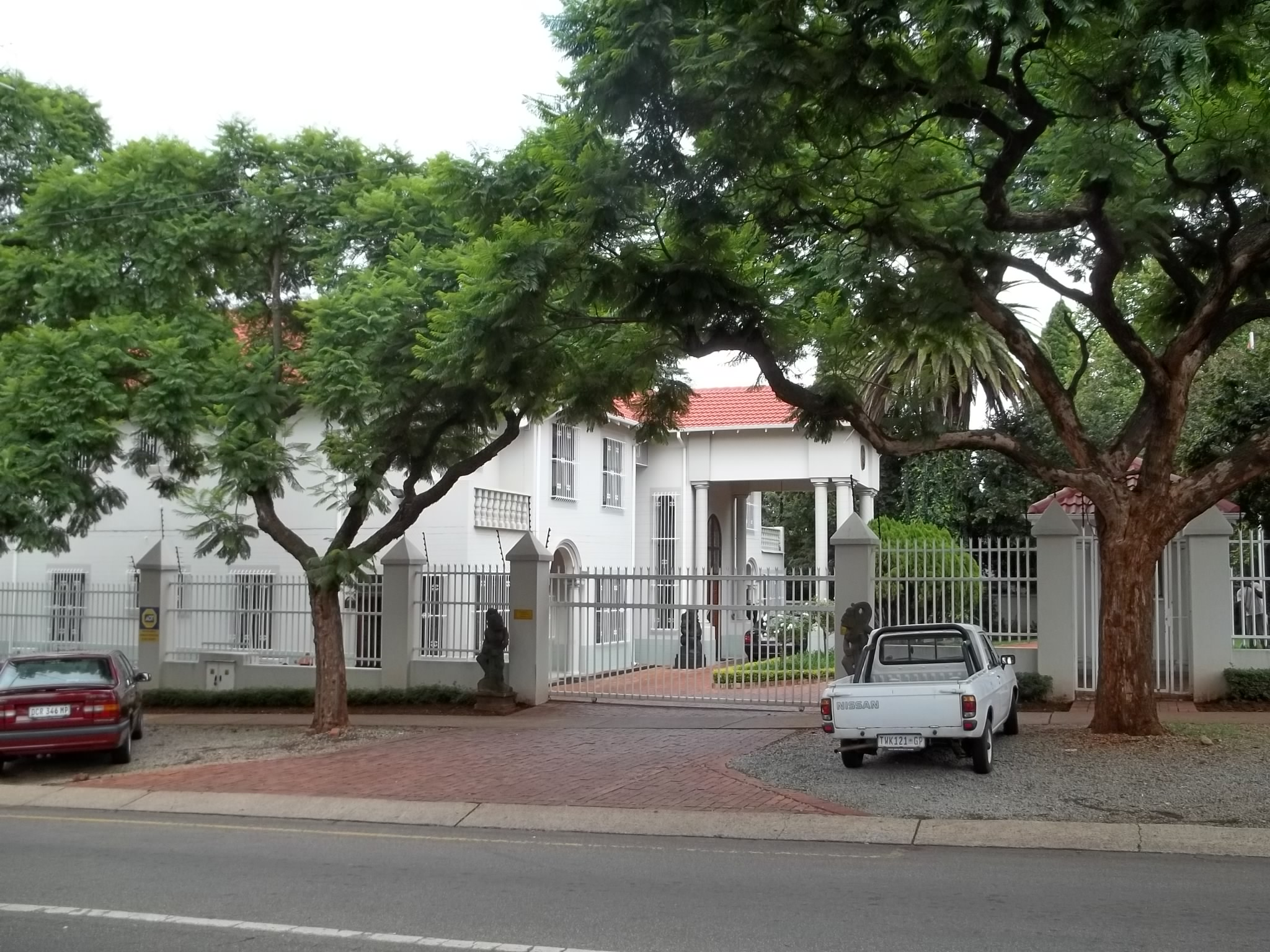
Embassy of Indonesia in Pretoria

Although formal diplomatic relations were only established in the 1990s, the historical links between Indonesia and South Africa date back to the 17th century. In 1693, Sheikh Yusuf from Makassar was exiled to the Cape of Good Hope, because he assisted Banten Sultan Ageng Tirtayasa's rebellion against the Dutch. At that time, the Dutch colonized both the Cape of Good Hope (now the city of Cape Town) and the Dutch East Indies (centered in Batavia). Yusuf's arrival in Cape Town established the Malay Muslim community in South Africa, as the town served as a penal settlement for convicts and political exiles from East Indies.

South Africa's Apartheid regime was one of only a handful of United Nations member states to support the Dutch view that the decolonization of Indonesia and the Netherlands New Guinea were of a 'domestic' nature and that the UN had no right to interfere. During that period, Indonesia joined the rest of the Asian countries in avoiding official relations with South Africa, however in 1968, Indonesia unofficially opened secret military and intelligence relations with South Africa through the Estado Novo regime of Portugal as well as through Israel. It was widely known that from 1968-69 onwards, Indonesia shared intelligence with South Africa and Israel through Portugal, Iran, and Turkey

Indonesian-South African relations were formalized through the establishment of diplomatic relations in August 1994. The South African Embassy in Jakarta was established in January 1995. It was officially opened by the former Minister of Foreign Affairs, Mr A Nzo in conjunction with a visit by Nelson Mandela as first post-apartheid President of South Africa on 14 July 1997. During the visit, Mandela asked Indonesian President Suharto to meet the then imprisoned East Timorese resistance leader, Xanana Gusmao. The South African Embassy in Jakarta is also accredited to ASEAN in order to maintain close interaction with the regional body, and also accredited to East Timor since 2009 on a non-residential basis.

From 23 to 24 August 2023, Indonesian President Joko Widodo attended the 15th BRICS summit in Johannesburg.

On 22 October 2025, South African President Cyril Ramaphosa visited Indonesia. He and Indonesian President Prabowo Subianto held bilateral meetings on economic cooperation.

== Trade and commerce ==
South Africa is Indonesia's largest trade partner in Africa which accounted for 22.18 percent of Indonesia's total trade with Africa in 2011. Trade between the two countries has seen a steady increase over the past few years and has the potential to grow. Bilateral trade between the two countries reached US$2.14 billion in 2011. Indonesia's exports were valued at US$1.44 billion in 2011 while imports were around US$705.78 million, resulting in a US$730.81 million trade surplus in favour of Indonesia. The South African market is one of Indonesia's key non-traditional markets, which is expected to drive future exports.
