= Secretary-General of ASEAN =

Officer of the Association of Southeast Asian Nations

Secretary-General of the Association of Southeast Asian Nations
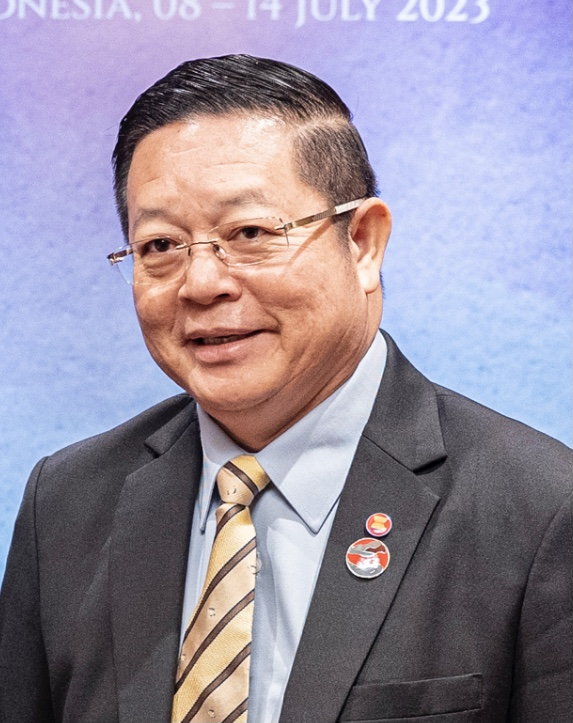
- Incumbent; Kao Kim Hourn since 1 January 2023
- Style: His Excellency
- Status: Chief administrative and coordinating officer
- Residence: ASEAN Secretariat
- Seat: Jakarta, Indonesia
- Appointer: ASEAN Summit
- Term length: Five years, non-renewable
- Constituting instrument: ASEAN Charter
- Inaugural holder: Hartono Dharsono
- Formation: 7 June 1976; 50 years ago
- First holder: Hartono Dharsono
- Website: asean.org

The Secretary-General of ASEAN is the chief administrative officer and principal representative of the Association of Southeast Asian Nations (ASEAN). Established by the 1976 Agreement on the Establishment of the ASEAN Secretariat and formally codified in the ASEAN Charter of 2008, the Secretary-General leads the ASEAN Secretariat in Jakarta, Indonesia, and is responsible for facilitating and monitoring the implementation of ASEAN agreements and decisions. Appointed by member states during an ASEAN Summit for a single non-renewable five-year term, the Secretary-General acts as a neutral regional official, supporting consensus-building among member states and representing ASEAN in external relations. The secretary-general must come from an ASEAN member state and will be appointed during the ASEAN Summit based on the alphabetical order of member states. The term of office is five years.

== History ==
=== Pre-2008 ===
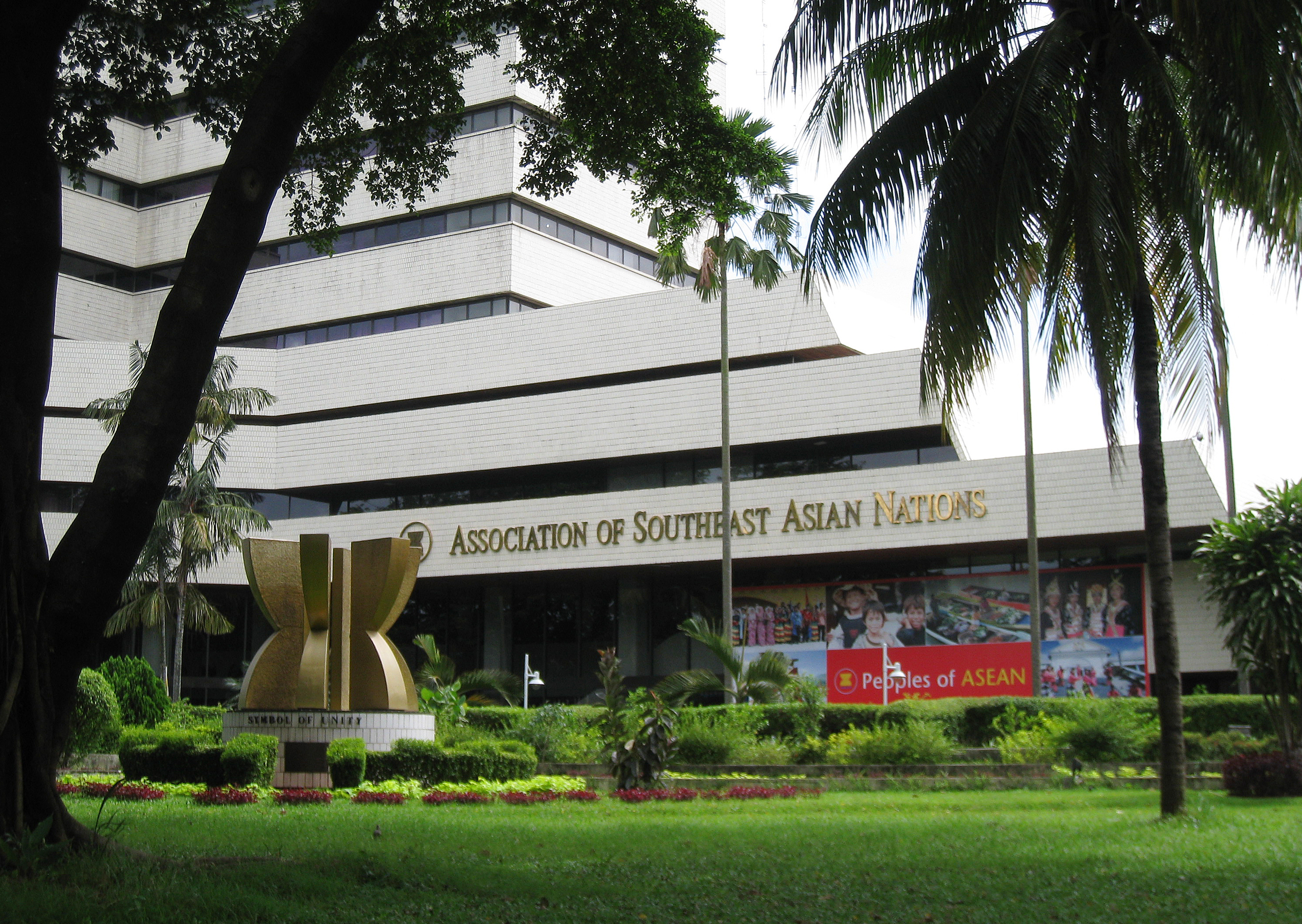
ASEAN Secretariat in Jalan Sisingamangaraja No.70A, South Jakarta, Indonesia.

The office was first created by the 1976 Agreement on the Establishment of the ASEAN Secretariat, which established a permanent ASEAN Secretariat in Jakarta headed by a Secretary-General. Under the1976 agreement, the Secretary-General (then titled Secretary-General of the ASEAN Secretariat) was appointed by the ASEAN Foreign Ministers on a rotating basis and had a two-year term. This laid the initial legal groundwork for the role.

=== Post-2008 ===
Subsequently, the ASEAN Charter (signed in 2007, in force 2008) elevated and codified the office of Secretary-General of ASEAN as a key ASEAN organ. Article 11 of the ASEAN Charter provides the primary legal basis for the position, detailing its appointment, mandate, and institutional protections. The Charter confers ASEAN with legal personality as an inter-governmental organization, enabling the Secretary-General to represent ASEAN in its external dealings. Crucially, the Charter designates the Secretary-General as the "Chief Administrative Officer" of ASEAN, denoting the role's authority to manage the ASEAN Secretariat and implement ASEAN's decisions.

The Charter also enshrines the independence of the Secretary-General and Secretariat staff: in carrying out their duties they "shall not seek or receive instructions from any government or external party" and must uphold the highest standards of integrity. In turn, all Member States "undertake to respect the exclusively ASEAN character of the responsibilities" of the Secretary-General and staff, agreeing not to influence them improperly in the discharge of their responsibilities. This establishes the institutional principle that the Secretary-General and ASEAN Secretariat function as international civil servants serving ASEAN as a whole. Furthermore, the ASEAN Charter and subsequent agreements accord the Secretary-General diplomatic privileges and immunities equivalent to a ministerial-level international official. The legal framework thus positions the Secretary-General as a neutral regional official with a treaty-based mandate to act on behalf of the ASEAN collective, rather than any single member state.

== Mandate of the Summit ==
The ASEAN Summit's role is to collectively endorses and appoints the nominee to the post. Typically, the government of the member state whose turn it is (by alphabetical rotation) will nominate a candidate (often a seasoned diplomat, minister, or senior official), and that nomination is then formally approved by the leaders at an ASEAN Summit. The Summit's appointment confers the mandate of all ten member states on the Secretary-General, reflecting a high level of political support. Because ASEAN operates by consensus, the appointed Secretary-General is effectively a consensus choice of all ten governments.

Prior to the Charter, appointments were made by ASEAN Foreign Ministers, but since the Charter, the ASEAN Heads of State/Government make the appointment. Once appointed, the new Secretary-General takes an oath of office and is accorded a status comparable to a government minister in ASEAN protocol. The five-year term begins on 1 January of the start year and ends on 31 December of the fifth year. There is no mechanism for early removal explicitly detailed in the Charter. The officeholder serves the full term at the pleasure of the ASEAN member states, and any mid-term vacancy would presumably be filled by consensus of the members (though this situation has not commonly arisen). The strict term limit and rotation are designed to ensure fairness among states and prevent dominance by any single country.

== List of Secretaries-General ==
| # | Term | Portrait | Name | Country |
|---|---|---|---|---|
| 1 | 7 June 1976 – 18 February 1978 | | Hartono Dharsono (1925–1996) | Indonesia |
| 2 | 19 February 1978 – 30 June 1978 | | Umarjadi Njotowijono (1910–2012) | Indonesia |
| 3 | 10 July 1978 – 30 June 1980 | | Ali Abdullah | Malaysia |
| 4 | 1 July 1980 – 1 July 1982 | | Narciso G. Reyes (1914–1996) | Philippines |
| 5 | 18 July 1982 – 15 July 1984 | | Chan Kai Yau (1930–2025) | Singapore |
| 6 | 16 July 1984 – 15 July 1986 | | Phan Wannamethee (born 1923) | Thailand |
| 7 | 16 July 1986 – 16 July 1989 | | Roderick Yong (born 1932) | Brunei |
| 8 | 17 July 1989 – 1 January 1993 | | Rusli Noor (born 1927) | Indonesia |
| 9 | 1 January 1993 – 31 December 1997 | | Ajit Singh (born 1939) | Malaysia |
| 10 | 1 January 1998 – 31 December 2002 | | Rodolfo Severino Jr. (1936–2019) | Philippines |
| 11 | 1 January 2003 – 31 December 2007 | | Ong Keng Yong (born 1954) | Singapore |
| 12 | 1 January 2008 – 31 December 2012 | | Surin Pitsuwan (1949–2017) | Thailand |
| 13 | 1 January 2013 – 31 December 2017 | | Lê Lương Minh (born 1952) | Vietnam |
| 14 | 1 January 2018 – 31 December 2022 | | Lim Jock Hoi (born 1951) | Brunei |
| 15 | 1 January 2023 – present | | Kao Kim Hourn (born 1966) | Cambodia |
