= Kahono Martohadinegoro =

Indonesian diplomat (1924–2001)

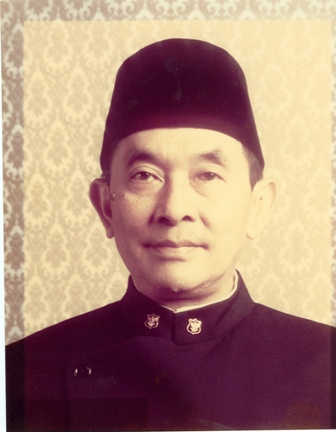

Ambassador of Indonesia to Belgium, Luxembourg, and the European Communities
- In office 8 November 1978 – 1982
- President: Suharto
- Preceded by: Atmono Suryo
- Succeeded by: Rusli Noor

Personal details
- Born: 20 October 1924 Semarang, Indonesia
- Died: 1 November 2001 (aged 77)
- Education: Gadjah Mada University (S.H.)

Kahono Martohadinegoro (20 October 1924 – 1 November 2001) was an Indonesian diplomat who served as ambassador to Belgium, with concurrent accreditation to Luxembourg and the European Communities, from 1978 to 1982. His prior assignment including service as director of multilateral economic relations and deputy permanent representative to the United Nations in Geneva.

== Early life and education ==
Kahono Martohadinegoro was born on October 20, 1924, in Semarang, Indonesia. His father, Soekarman Martohadinegoro, was the regent of Semarang during the Japanese occupation of the Dutch East Indies. He spent his early adulthood entering the public sector, starting his career as a civil servant in April 1944 and serving in this capacity until August 1950. He then studied law at the Gadjah Mada University in Yogyakarta. In 1951, Kahono along with other trade and industry ministry civil servants, including Rusli Noor, was sent for a master's study in London. He departed Jakarta for the occasion on 24 February 1951.

== Diplomatic career ==
After receiving his master's degree, Kahono was posted to the embassy in London as commercial attaché in October 1953. He continued to serve until November 1955 before returning to Jakarta and reassigned as a civil servant in the foreign ministry until March 1959. Following his initial stint in Jakarta, he was posted to the embassy in Kuala Lumpur with the diplomatic rank of third secretary from March 1959 until December 1960. He was subsequently transferred to the Indonesian Embassy in Brussels, working as a Second Secretary between December 1960 and January 1964. Kahono then returned to the foreign department headquarters in Jakarta for an assignment spanning January 1964 to September 1966, after which he was deployed to the embassy in Bangkok with the diplomatic rank of first secretary from September 1966 to March 1969.

In March 1962, Kahono initiated an extended period of service with the Permanent Mission of Indonesia to the United Nations in New York, where he operated as a Counsellor until August 1970, and was later promoted to Minister Counsellor, serving from August 1970 to February 1971. Returning to Jakarta, he assumed the role of Head of the Division for Multilateral Cooperation within the Directorate for Multilateral Economic Cooperation under the Directorate-General for Economic and Social-Cultural Relations from February 1971 to Nov 1972. This was followed by his appointment as the Director for Technical Cooperation Department from September 1972 to 1974, and subsequently as the Director of the Multilateral Cooperation Department from September 1974 to March 1976. He returned to Switzerland to serve as deputy permanent representative to the United Nations in Geneva from March 1976 to 1978. On 8 November 1978, Kahono was installed as ambassador to Belgium, with concurrent accreditation to Luxemburg and the European Communities, after having received approval from the Belgian government a month prior. He presented his credentials to President of the European Commission Roy Jenkins on 12 December 1978, Jean, Grand Duke of Luxembourg on 12 January 1979, and King Baudouin of Belgium on 19 January 1979. Rusli Noor was appointed to replace him in September 1982.

== Death ==
Kahono died on 1 November 2001, at the age of 77.

== Awards ==
For his role during the Indonesian National Revolution, Kahono received the Bintang Kemerdekaan. On 20 October 1980, Kahono received the Civil Servants' Long Service Medal, 3rd Class (Indonesian: Satyalancana Karya Satya X Tahun).
