= Roderick Yong =

Bruneian diplomat and teacher

Dato Paduka Roderick Yong DPMB PKL
- 杨仁发

7th Secretary-General of ASEAN
- In office 16 July 1986 – 16 July 1989
- Preceded by: Phan Wannamethee
- Succeeded by: Rusli Noor

Personal details
- Born: Yong Yin Fatt; 6 November 1932 (age 93) Brunei
- Education: Chung Hwa School; St. George's School
- Alma mater: University of Sydney
- Occupation: Diplomat; teacher

Chinese name
- Simplified Chinese: 杨仁发
- Traditional Chinese: 楊仁發
Transcriptions
Standard Mandarin
- Hanyu Pinyin: Yáng Rénfā

Roderick Yong Yin Fatt (Chinese: 杨仁发; pinyin: Yáng Rénfā; born 6 November 1932) is a retired Bruneian educator and diplomat who made history as the first Bruneian and the seventh Secretary-General of ASEAN, serving from 1986 to 1989. He played a pivotal role in Brunei's education system, becoming the first English-medium teacher with secondary qualifications and later leading the Chinese School Division, where he oversaw curriculum development and teacher registration.

== Early life and education ==
Yong Yin Fatt, born on 6 November 1932, is the eldest of ten siblings. He began his education at Chung Hwa School in Brunei before moving on to Chi Wen Chinese Primary School in Labuan. After the Japanese invasion in 1941, he returned to Brunei but was unable to continue his studies during that tumultuous period. In 1947, he resumed his education at St. George's School in Brunei Town, ultimately completing his secondary education in Jesselton, where he earned his Cambridge Senior School Certificate. Yong later pursued his college and university education through Brunei's in-service training program. He benefited from the significant political changes in Brunei, particularly those initiated by Sultan Omar Ali Saifuddien III, who championed the country's transition to internal self-government in 1959 and independence in 1984. The Sultan's commitment to educating Bruneians played a crucial role in shaping Yong's opportunities to contribute to the nation’s governance.

== Career in education ==
Yong entered the government service after finishing his secondary school, first serving for six months as a clerk and then as a trainee teacher. He was the first and only secondary-educated English-medium teacher in the area when he started teaching at Brunei Town's Government English School, which was the sole English-medium government school at the time. After a year as a trainee, the Bruneian government sent Yong to the Singapore's Teachers' Training College for a two-year program, where he obtained the Certificate in Education, Singapore's highest non-graduate teaching credential. He went back to teaching at his former school in Brunei, which had been renamed Sultan Omar Ali Saifuddien College and moved to a new site with more space.

In order to prepare for taking over the position when the main Chinese schools supervisor retired, Yong was moved to Anthony Abell College in Seria in 1958 to teach English preparatory classes and serve as an understudy. Under the Colombo Plan, Yong was awarded a scholarship by the Australian Government in 1960 to study teaching english as a foreign language at the University of Sydney. He finished the program in 1961. After returning, Yong was placed in the Department of Education's Chinese Schools division, where he helped the top supervisor until departing for Canada to obtain a degree in East Asian studies with a concentration in Chinese History and Civilization.

Yong was elevated to lead the Department of Education's Chinese School division after returning from Canada in 1969. He was in charge of all issues pertaining to Chinese schools in this capacity, including curriculum selection, teacher registration, school administration, and adherence to legal requirements. Additionally, he served as the chair of the board for the National Junior and Senior Middle Common Examinations, which Taiwanese and Singaporean colleges accepted. After the education department was restructured in 1983, Yong became a specialist inspector in the newly formed Inspectorate of Schools and eventually rose to the position of director.

== Diplomatic career ==
In 1985, Yong was transferred to the ASEAN Division of the Ministry of Foreign Affairs, where he immersed himself in the organisation by attending various meetings and engaging with representatives from other ASEAN member states. His role also extended to representing Brunei at the United Nations General Assembly that same year. In 1986, Yong was nominated by Brunei to serve as the Secretary-General of ASEAN in Jakarta, a position he held for three years. During his tenure, he managed significant ASEAN meetings and discussions with key partners, including the United States, the European Union, and Japan. His efforts not only enhanced Brunei's global influence but also facilitated economic concessions and development in human resources across the region.

Yong was officially appointed as the successor to Phan Wannamethee during the 19th ASEAN Ministerial Meeting in Manila in June 1986. His nomination allowed Brunei to engage with its Southeast Asian neighbors diplomatically without compromising its stance. Notably, he presided over the seventh ASEAN Economic Ministers' meeting on energy cooperation held from 7 to 8 April 1988, where Sultan Hassanal Bolkiah officially opened the proceedings. Yong's term concluded on 16 July 1989, when he was succeeded by Rusli Noor from Indonesia.

== Personal life ==
Yong's ancestry traces back to Ruijin in Jiangxi province, located in the Yangtze River valley of Eastern China, setting him apart from many Chinese Bruneians whose roots lie in the southern provinces of Guangdong and Fujian. Ruijin, often referred to as the "Red Capital," holds historical significance as a key site of the Chinese Communist Revolution, which played a crucial role in shaping modern Chinese history. In 1927, Yong's father, the youngest of four brothers, was brought to Brunei by a relative who had prospered there to manage his rubber plantations. After several years of hard work, he established his own business as a rubber and vegetable farmer in Kampong Subok, located about 3 miles (4.8 km) from Brunei Town. Eventually, he married a Hakka woman from Labuan, and together they had ten children—six daughters and four sons.

Despite his retirement, Yong leads an active lifestyle, enjoying golf and traveling frequently with friends. He is an avid reader with diverse interests and keeps himself informed about current affairs through both print and digital media. Since the incorporation of Telekom Brunei in 2002, he has remained a member of its board of directors. Although his marriage did not yield children, he enjoys the company of his siblings, their families, and grandchildren.

== Awards and honours ==
=== Awards ===
Roderick Yong earned the 2008 Teacher Day's Retired Teacher Award, which came with a gold medal, a certificate of honor, cash in the amount of $4,000, access to a first-class ward at the government hospital, and free medical care at home from a government nurse.

=== Honours ===
Throughout his career, he has achieved the following honours:

- Order of Seri Paduka Mahkota Brunei Second Class (DPMB) – Dato Paduka
- Order of Seri Paduka Mahkota Brunei Third Class (SMB)
- Long Service Medal (PKL; 15 July 1979)

Political offices
Preceded by Phan Wannamethee	Secretary-General of ASEAN; 1986–1989	Succeeded by Rusli Noor
Incumbent
