= Andy Rachmianto =

Career diplomat and government official (born 1965)

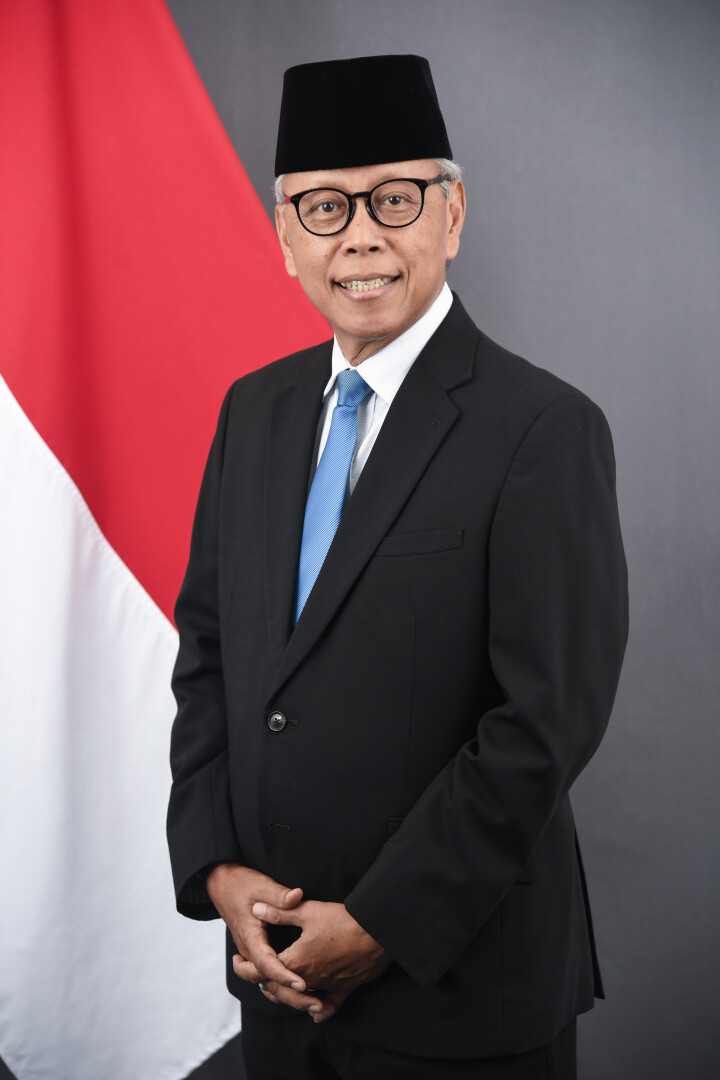

Director-General for Protocol and Consular Affairs/Chief of State Protocol
- In office 19 June 2020 – 13 April 2026
- President: Joko Widodo
- Minister: Retno Marsudi
- Preceded by: Andri Hadi
- Succeeded by: Saud Purwanto Krisnawan

Ambassador of the Republic of Indonesia to the Hashemite Kingdom of Jordan and the State of Palestine
- In office 2017–2020
- Preceded by: Teguh Wardoyo
- Succeeded by: Ade Padmo Sarwono

Personal details
- Spouse: Ismi Rohimaningsih
- Children: 2
- Education: Padjadjaran University, Jawaharlal Nehru University, India

Andy Rachmianto (born in Jakarta, 8 April 1965), is a career diplomat and government official. He is now Director-General for Protocol and Consular Affairs/Chief of State Protocol, Ministry of Foreign Affairs, Republic of Indonesia.

== Life and career ==
Before appointed in his current position, he was the Ambassador of the Republic of Indonesia to the Hashemite Kingdom of Jordan and the State of Palestine (2017–2020). Previously, he was the Director for International Security and Disarmament at the Ministry of Foreign Affairs since May 2013. Previously, he served as Minister Counselor (Economic, Social & Humanitarian Affairs) at the Permanent mission of the Republic of Indonesia to the United Nations, New York (2011–2013).

In 1992, he joined the Foreign Service Course and later served as a junior staff at the Office of the Executive Agency for the Non-Aligned Movement (1993–1996).

Subsequently, he was assigned as Third Secretary (Political, Information & Consular) at the Indonesian Embassy in New Delhi (1996–2000). Then served as Head of Section / Acting Head of Sub-Directorate of Functional Cooperation / Dialogue Partner, Directorate General of ASEAN Cooperation, as well as Personal Assistance to Director General Cooperation of ASEAN (2000–2002).

In the period of 2002–2006, he was assigned as Second Secretary/First Secretary (Political/ Security) to the Permanent Mission of the Republic of Indonesia to the United Nations in New York and concurrently acted as the Coordinator/Negotiator of the Non-Aligned Movement (NAM) Working Group on Disarmament.

Upon his return to Jakarta in 2007, he was appointed as Deputy Director/Counselor for Weapons of Mass Destruction and Conventional Weapons, the Directorate of International Security and Disarmament, responsible for Indonesia's policy on disarmament and non-proliferation in all its aspects.

As a diplomat, his professional career mostly dealt with multilateral issues in disarmament, humanitarian, economic and social issues. Since 2002, he has been a member of the Indonesian Delegation to the First Committee, Third Committee and Fifth Committee of the United Nations General Assembly, the Security Council and the ECOSOC as well as various UN meetings, ASEAN, NAM and other international meetings.

In his personal capacity, he was selected as a member of the UN Secretary-General's Panel of Governmental Experts on Missiles in all its Aspects (2007–2008); UN Secretary-General's Group of Governmental Experts on Information Security (2012); UN Secretary-General's Group of Governmental Experts on Fissile Materials Cut-Off Treaty (2014–2015) and the Council for Security Cooperation in Asia-Pacific (CSCAP) Study Group on Countering WMD (2008–2010).

During his assignments in New York, he served as Vice President of the First Committee of UNGA (2005) and vice-president of the executive board of the UNDP, UNFPA & UNOPS, as well as a facilitator of UNDP Country Program on Myanmar and ECOSOC resolution on the Strengthening of the coordination of emergency humanitarian assistance of the United Nations.

As the Director for International Security and Disarmament, he concurrently acted as Co-Chairs Steering Group of the Bali Process on People Smuggling, Trafficking in Persons and other Transnational Organized Crimes; Co-Chairs Global Counter-Terrorism Forum (GCTF) Working Group on Detention and Reintegration; board member of Supervisor-the Jakarta Center for Law Enforcement Cooperation (JCLEC); Sous-Sherpa Indonesia for Nuclear Security Summit (NSS) as well as Head of Secretariat of Coordination Team for Peace Keeping Operations and a member of Asia Dialogue on Forced Migration.

His articles have been published in various national and international media such as Kompas, The Jakarta Post, Suara Pembaruan, Media Indonesia, Republika, Journal of Diplomacy, the Jordan Times, GATRA Magazine and The Strategic Review.

== Decoration ==
- Satya Lencana Karyasatya award for 10 years of service from the President of the Republic of Indonesia (2002)
- Satya Lencana Karyasatya award for 20 years of service from the President of the Republic of Indonesia (2012)
- Dedicated Alumni for Diplomacy Award from University of Padjadjaran, Bandung, Indonesia (2015)
- Garuda Peacekeeping Medal from Commander of Battalion, Indonesian Peacekeeping Force to UNIFIL, Southern Lebanon (2018)
- Star of Friendship from the President of Palestine, Mahmoud Abbas (2020)
- Honorary Insignia "Setia Waspada" from Presidential Security Force (2022)
- Satya Lencana Karyasatya award for 30 years of service from the President of the Republic of Indonesia (2023)
- Pro Ecclesia et Pontifice from Pope Leo XIV (2025)
