= Ignacio Kristanyo Hardojo =

Indonesian diplomat (born 1960)

Indonesia Chargé d'Affaires ad interim to Belgium
- In office 2015–2016
- President: Joko Widodo
- Preceded by: Arif Havas Oegroseno (ambassador)
- Succeeded by: Yuri Octavian Thamrin (ambassador)

Personal details
- Born: 28 May 1960 (age 66) Manila, Philippines
- Children: 1
- Education: University of Indonesia (Drs.); University of Wollongong (MA)

Ignacio Kristanyo Hardojo (born 28 May 1960) is an Indonesian diplomat. A graduate of the University of Indonesia and the University of Wollongong, Hardojo has been assigned to various postings both abroad and domestic, with his prominent posting being as consul in Vanimo from 2005 to 2008, director of diplomatic security from 2010 to 2013, and chargé d'affaires ad interim to Belgium from 2015 to 2016.

== Early life ==
Hardojo was born in Manila on 28 May 1960. He was raised in a large family alongside eight siblings by a father who was also a diplomat. His father granted all of his children the freedom to choose their own career paths. Ignacio was the only one of his siblings to pursue a career in diplomacy, while his siblings entered the private sector. Ignacio began studying international relations (then a specialization of the political sciences major) at the University of Indonesia in 1979 and graduated in 1984.

== Diplomatic career ==
Hardojo completed his basic diplomatic education (Sekdilu, Sekolah Dinas Luar Negeri) in 1986. Among his classmates in Sekdilu were future foreign ministers Marty Natalegawa and Retno Marsudi. Prior to receiving his first overseas assignment at the embassy in Stockholm, Hardojo completed his master's studies in the University of Wollongong in 1990.

In light of reorganizations within the foreign department in 2002, Hardojo was assigned to the newly established directorate of Asia, Pacific, and Africa, where he assumed duties as deputy director of the 3rd African region in the Africa directorate. After several years, on 11 February 2005 Hardojo assumed duties as consul in Vanimo, Papua New Guinea, where he served for a three-year term until 2008. During his tenure in Vanimo, Hardojo had bouts of malaria, which shifted his health and sports routine. Hardojo had to oversee the mandatory autopsy of a shot Indonesian citizen whose skull had to be sawed open under international law to extract a bullet. Due to a total lack of ready-made coffins in Vanimo, which required a minimum two-week advance order, Ignacio and his consular team manually constructed a coffin themselves to repatriate the citizen's remains.

The consulate, under his leadership, was oftentimes involved in handling serious border relations and incidents, especially in 2006. In January that year, the consulate general was attacked in response to a kidnapping allegedly done by the Indonesian army. Later in August, Hardojo lodged a protest to the Papua New Guinea government following the death of an Indonesian fisherman who was shot by the Papua New Guinean police. A Free West Papua Campaign press release reported on 22 August 2006 that Hardojo refused to go through immigration control at the Indonesia–Papua New Guinea border crossing in Wutung, claiming that he was late to an important meeting.

Following his stint in Vanimo, Hardojo returned to the Asia, Pacific, and Africa directorate general as a functional officer without any portofolio. In 2010, he became the foreign department's director of diplomatic security, replacing Sudjatmiko who was named ambassador to Sudan. Hardojo viewed his directorate's portofolio in a wider scope rather than something that is limited to the military or the police. Hardojo played a role in coordinating security measures for foreign missions in Indonesia and Indonesian missions abroad, as well as the security of expatriates in Indonesia and Indonesians living abroad. To achieve this goal, he regularly partnered with civil agencies as well as international bodies. The directorate also managed issues beyond its scope of duties, such as on Papua and human trafficking.

In June 2013, Hardojo became the deputy chief of mission at the embassy in Brussels. He officially began his duties on 1 July 2013. Between 2015 and 2016, Ignacio became the embassy's chargé d'affaires ad interim following the departure of ambassador Arif Havas Oegroseno. During his stint in Brussels, Ignacio announced Indonesia's participation as a guest country in the 2017 edition of Europalia and invited Belgian businesspersons to invest in Indonesia. Following his departure from Brussels in 2016, Hardojo was reassigned as a senior diplomat at the directorate for international security and disarmament.

== Personal life ==
Hardojo is married and has a son.
