= Atmono Suryo =

Indonesian diplomat (1925–2016)

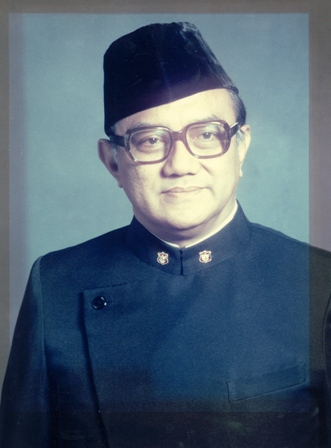

Ambassador of Indonesia to the European Communities
- In office 29 September 1986 – 1993
- President: Suharto
- Preceded by: Rusli Noor
- Succeeded by: Adrianus Mooy
- In office 6 April 1976 – 23 November 1978
- Preceded by: Frans Seda
- Succeeded by: Kahono Martohadinegoro

Ambassador of Indonesia to Belgium and Luxembourg
- In office 1986–1990
- President: Suharto
- Preceded by: Rusli Noor
- Succeeded by: Teuku Muhammad Zahirsjah
- In office 18 March 1976 – 23 November 1978
- Preceded by: Frans Seda
- Succeeded by: Kahono Martohadinegoro

Permanent Representative of Indonesia to the United Nations in Geneva
- In office 1978–1981
- Preceded by: Ali Alatas
- Succeeded by: Irawan Darsa

Director General of Foreign Economic Relations
- In office 7 January 1983 – 22 July 1986
- Preceded by: Rusli Noor
- Succeeded by: Rusli Noor

Director General of the National ASEAN Secretariat of Indonesia (Note: Secretary general until 29 March 1982.)
- In office 30 December 1980 – 7 January 1983
- Preceded by: Umarjadi Njotowijono
- Succeeded by: Adiwoso Abubakar

Head of the National Agency for Export Development
- In office 28 August 1973 – 19 February 1976
- Preceded by: Subroto
- Succeeded by: Sukirman

Personal details
- Born: November 18, 1925 Pekalongan, Central Java, Dutch East Indies
- Died: October 26, 2016 (aged 90) Jakarta, Indonesia
- Spouse: Siti Dewi Sutan Assin (m. 1959; died 2000)
- Relations: Sutan Assin Datuk Mangkuto (father-in-law); Farid Anfasa Moeloek (cousin)
- Children: 3
- Parent: Adipati Ario Soerjo (father)
- Education: The New School for Social Research (MA)

Atmono Suryo (18 November 1925 – 26 October 2016) was an Indonesian career diplomat who has served as ambassador to Belgium and ambassador to the European Communities. He had also served a number of appointments domestically, including as the head of the national export agency in the trade department, director general of Indonesia's ASEAN national secretariat, as well as director general of foreign economic relations.

Born in Pekalongan, Atmono worked in the ministry of trade and industry before pivoting to the diplomatic service after receiving his master's degree. He was successively posted in Mexico, London, Geneva, and Washington D.C.. He then returned home as the head of the national agency for export development, during which Indonesia's non-traditional exports exceeded its traditional exports for the first time.

After his trade ministry's role, Atmono was appointed as ambassador in Belgium for two separate terms (1976–1980 and 1986–1990) with a stint in between as permanent representative in Geneva and as director general in the foreign department. Atmono signed the joint communiqué that established Indonesia's diplomatic relations with Colombia, as well as economic treaties with foreign states, including the Eastern Bloc countries. Atmono's fourth and last ambassadorial term came with his appointment Indonesia's ambassador to the European Communities, during which he coordinated Indonesia's response towards the European single market and facing European parliamentarians demanding accountability for Indonesia's actions in East Timor.

== Early life, education, and personal life ==
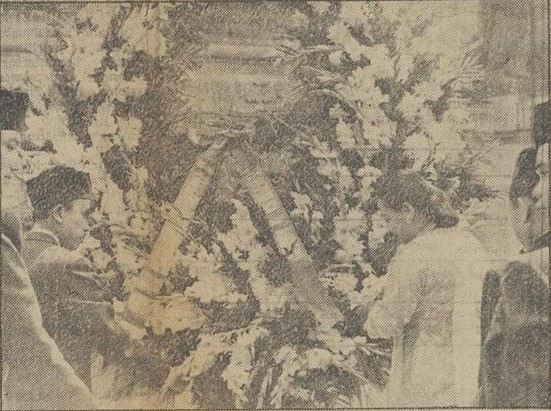
Atmono (far left, partially visible) laying wreath in front of the Monumento a la Revolución, 1955.

Atmono was born on 18 November 1925 in Pekalongan. In 1951, Atmono, already a civil servant in the ministry of trade and industry, was sent to New York to pursue his master's degree at the The New School for Social Research. He departed Jakarta for the occasion on 24 February 1951. By 1953, he also worked as adjunct vice consul for commercial affairs at Indonesia's consulate general in New York, before being recruited by the foreign ministry and posted as commercial attaché in Mexico in October 1955. In his later statement, he viewed the bilateral relations between Indonesia and Mexico as a "breakthrough". He completed his master's degree with a thesis titled Export Trade and Economic Development in Indonesia, 1950-1955 in December 1956, with economists Henry G. Aubrey, Alfred Kahler, and Alexander Melamid as his academic advisors.

Atmono was married to Siti Dewi Ganto Nilai Suryo, commonly known in short as Siti Dewi or Siti Dewi Sutan Assin, on 29 September 1959. Siti's father was a physician who practiced in Manado, and moved to Yogyakarta during Siti's early childhood. Atmono's extended cousin from Siti's side includes former health minister Farid Anfasa Moeloek. Siti, who was Atmono's junior in high school, began dated him while he was pursuing his master's degree. After their marriage, Siti followed Atmono throughout his diplomatic assignments until her death in 2000. The couple has two sons and a daughter.

== Diplomatic career ==
Following a brief domestic assignment, by 1961 Atmono was sent to the economic section of Indonesia's London embassy with the diplomatic rank of second secretary. He represented Indonesia at the Wheat Conference at Geneva in March 1962. By 1963, he had already been promoted to first secretary in the midst of the degradation of diplomatic relations between Indonesia and United Kingdom, which saw Indonesia lowering its representation in London to a chargé d'affaires level. He was then successively posted at the permanent mission to the United Nations in Geneva with the rank of counsellor, where in 1968 he was part of Indonesia's delegate to the United Nations Conference on Trade and Development in New Delhi, India. After his stint in Europe, Atmono became the head of economic section at the embassy in Washington, D.C. with the rank of minister counsellor. He was then promoted to the rank of minister and became the embassy's deputy chief of mission, or the second-in-command.

On 28 August 1973, trade minister Radius Prawiro inducted Atmono as the head of the agency for national export improvement. Early in his term, in September 1973 he introduced an award for economic reporters who made contribution towards Indonesia's trade, specifically in export developments. Under his leadership, the agency received requests for craft, agricultural and industrial goods to the point of overwhelm, as described by Atmono in 1974. Atmono closely worked with the trade ministry's research and development agency to formulate a funding scheme for non-traditional exports, which resulted in exports of non-traditional items, such as animal feed and fisheries products, surpassing traditional exports by December 1975. Between April and May 1975, Atmono led a trade delegation to New Zealand, which successfully negotiated a bilateral trade agreement. Two days after he was installed as ambassador, on 19 February 1976 he handed back his leadership of the agency to Radius Prawiro.

=== First and second ambassadorial term ===
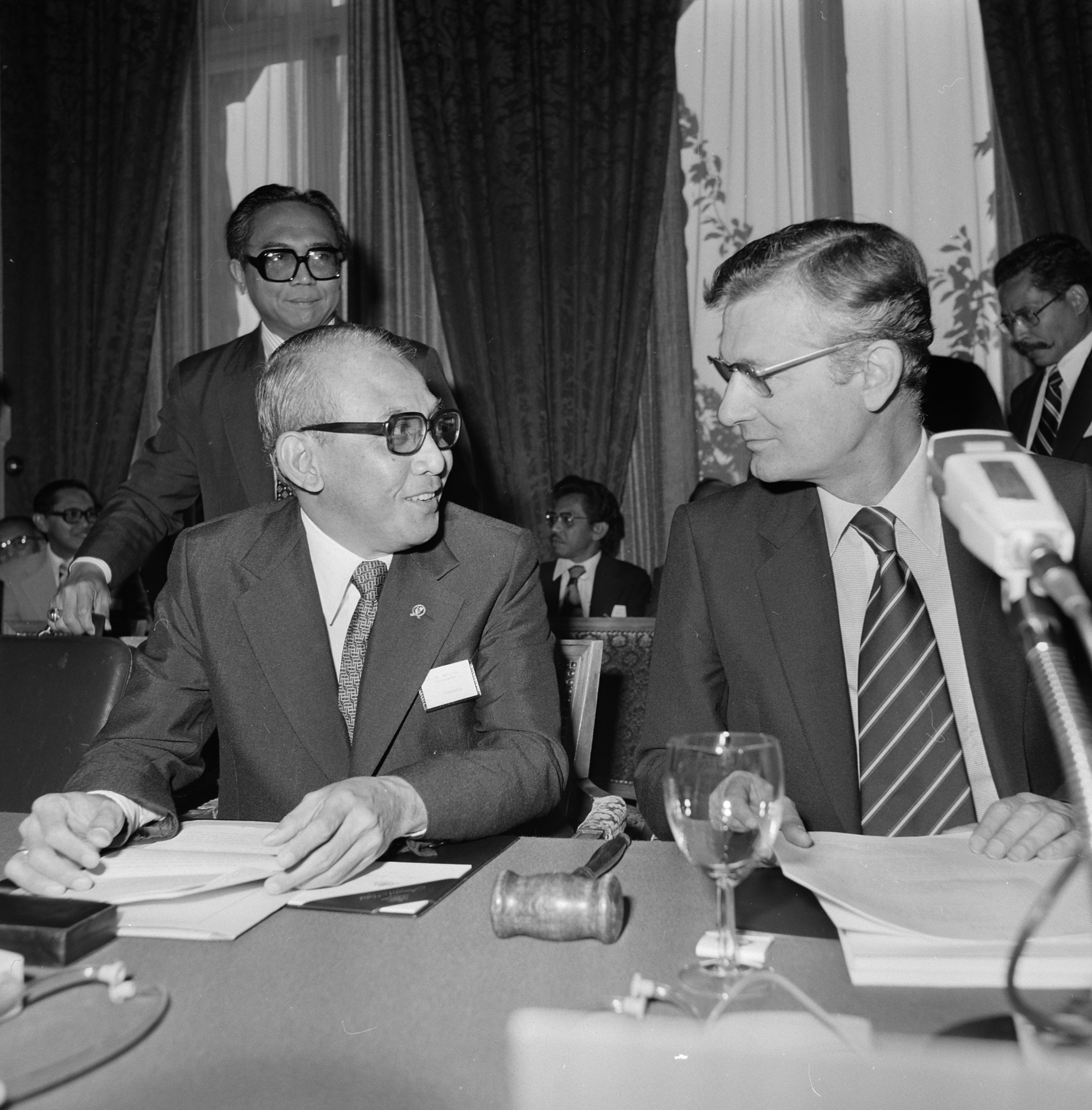
Atmono (standing behind) during an Inter-Governmental Group on Indonesia conference in 1978.

Atmono became the ambassador to Belgium, with concurrent accreditation to Luxembourg and the European Communities, on 17 February 1976. He presented his credentials to King Baudouin of Belgium on 18 March 1976 and the President of the European Commission François-Xavier Ortoli on 6 April 1976. On the latter occasion, prime ministers of Luxembourg Gaston Thorn also received the credentials for Luxembourg on behalf of the Grand Duke. Atmono emphasized the need to cooperate between European Communities countries and ASEAN, with a meeting organized sometime around the formal end of his term on 23 November 1978. He was then transferred to Geneva, leading Indonesia's permanent mission to the United Nations there as permanent representative in 1978. On 15 September 1980, Atmono and his Colombian counterpart Alfonso Jaramillo Salazar signed a joint communiqué establishing diplomatic relations between the two countries. Atmono's replacement, Irawan Darsa, was appointed in early 1981.

=== Indonesia's ASEAN director general ===
On 30 December 1980, Atmono became the secretary general of Indonesia's ASEAN national secretariat. The presidential edict No. 15 of 1982, enacted on 29 March 1982, renamed his position to director general to streamline it with other first-level echelon offices. Atmono was present in numerous ASEAN related ceremonies, including the handover of present from the Japanese government to the ASEAN secretariat in November 1981. He was part of the advisory council for the opening ceremony of ASEAN's new headquarters in April 1981. After the ASEAN foreign minister's summit held in Singapore in June 1982, Atmono proposed to strengthen ASEAN's institutional mechanism through the establishment of an ASEAN council of ministers supported by an executive committee as its daily governing board and the unification of the ASEAN different secretariats under the same roof.

=== Director general of foreign economic relations ===
Atmono was installed as the foreign department's director general of foreign economic relations on 7 January 1983, replacing Gusti Rusli Noor. As the official in charge of Indonesia's foreign economic relations, Atmono frequently traveled as part of Indonesia's government delegation to international conferences and meetings. In 1983, due to cabinet changes, Atmono represented the foreign minister in the Group of 77 ministerial summit in Buenos Aires. A month later, Atmono was part of Indonesia's delegate to the Non-Aligned Movement Summit in India. In light of Indonesia's bid for hosting the International Tropical Timber Organization headquarters, in 1985 Atmono worked alongside foreign minister Mochtar Kusumaatmadja and forest management director general Sumarsono Martosudigdo to lobby member countries.

Atmono represented the central government in signing foreign economy related, mostly aid assistance, agreements. Atmono signed agreements with Japan on the construction of a geothermal power plant in Gresik, a laboratory for veterinary medicine experiments, and agricultural projects. With the U.S., Atmono exchanged notes with the U.S. ambassador Paul Wolfowitz regarding Garuda Indonesia's flight destination in the U.S., agriculture aid program with the assistance of the United States Agency for International Development, and an 11.5 million dollar loan agreement to develop public health and agriculture education. He also signed agreements on the construction of new telecommunications network with the United Kingdom, on financial assistance for Indonesia's development projects with Belgium, on soft loans to finance the procurement of passenger and cargo ships with West Germany, on interest-free loans to procure potash fertilizer with Canada, and on double tax avoidance with Denmark.

In light of economic reforms implemented by Soviet Union leader Mikhail Gorbachev within Soviet Union and its satellite countries, Indonesia increased its economic engagement with Comecon countries, with its implementation done by Atmono. In May 1986, he led the Indonesian delegation to the first Indonesia-East Germany joint commission meeting in Jakarta, which focused on developing consultation mechanisms to increase economic relations. The meeting resulted in an agreement signed by Atmono in East Berlin which, among others, assured Indonesia's participation in the Leipzig Trade Fair. Atmono also led bilateral commission meeting regarding economic relations with the Polish People's Republic and the People's Republic of Bulgaria. In 1985, amidst the lack of diplomatic relations between Indonesia and China, Atmono advised the Indonesian Chamber of Commerce to draft a memorandum with its Chinese counterpart after the 30th anniversary of the Bandung Conference, in the presence of China's foreign minister Wu Xueqian.

=== Third ambassadorial term ===
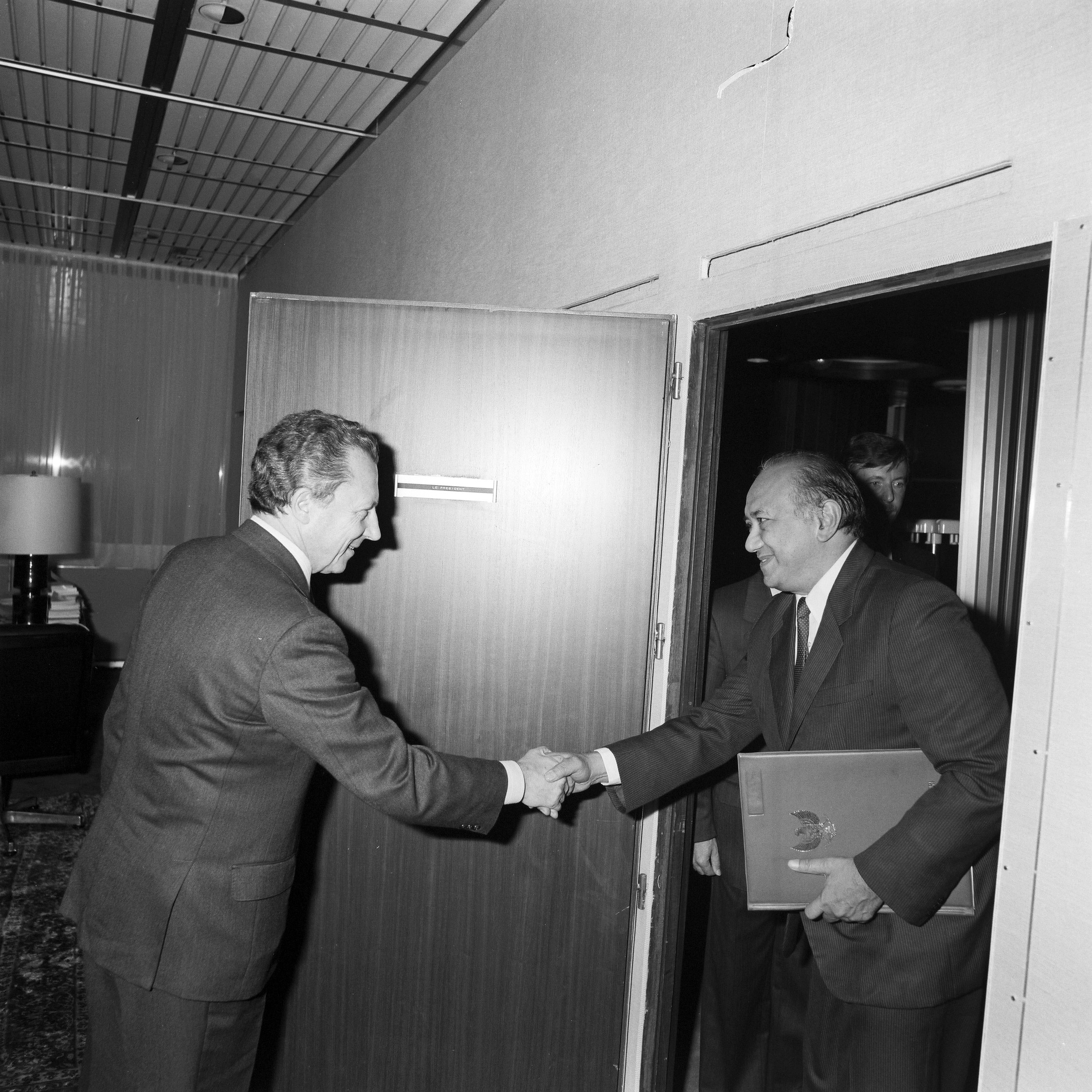
Atmono (right) at the presentation of his credentials for the European Communities for the second time, 1986.

Atmono swapped posts with Rusli Noor after the end of his director general's tenure. Atmono was installed for a second time as ambassador to Belgium on 16 June 1986, while Rusli was installed for a second time as director general on 22 July. Atmono presented his credentials to President of the European Commission Jacques Delors on 29 September 1986. In 1989, member of European parliament (MEP) Beate Weber sent an open letter to Atmono questioning the mass arrests of East Timorese shortly before President Suharto's visit several months prior and regarding referendum to determine East Timor's status. Shortly before the end of his tenure, Atmono witnessed the Indonesian-Belgian financial agreement which provided the funds for, among others, the establishment of an Indonesian investment office in Brussels to promote bilateral projects.

Atmono commenting on ASEAN-European Community relations.

In 1990, Atmono voiced his concerns regarding the European Communities "concentric circles for its relations with third countries", stating that it "will push Asia further and further to the outer rim of priorities." The regional trade bloc, formed through Eurocentricity, would soon include EFTA, and progressively include Eastern Europe as its countries succeed in implementing democratic reforms.

=== Fourth ambassadorial term ===
In 1990, the European Communities function of the embassy in Belgium was separated to form its own mission, the permanent mission to the European Communities (PRIME, Perutusan R.I. untuk Masyarakat Eropa). It was a move to reciprocate EC, who had sent their first resident ambassador to Indonesia two years earlier.

Atmono faced calls from European Parliament members for Indonesia to be held responsible for its actions in its occupied province of East Timor, especially after the Santa Cruz massacre which resulted in the deaths of hundreds of Timorese people. On 8 April 1992, following a meeting with President Suharto, Atmono accused Portugal, who at that time was holding the Presidency of the Council of the European Union, of influencing the Netherlands to escalate Indonesia's aid rejection to a European wide level. Indonesia had previously formally rejected the Netherlands' aid on 25 March, alleging it to be used for intimidation. Atmono proposed the establishment of a new consultative aid forum as an alternative to the Dutch-sponsored Inter-Governmental Group on Indonesia.

Two weeks later, on 23 April 1992, Atmono was summoned to a hearing by the European Parliament regarding human rights conditions in East Timor. During the hearing, witnesses to the massacre and key members of East Timor NGOs testified against Indonesia. Atmono pleaded to give "peace and development a chance in East Timor" and denied accusations of the army committing tortures and kidnapping of Timorese people as baseless, as it "failed to pass through the United Nations Commission on Human Rights". Atmono also emphasized that human rights were enshrined into Indonesia's constitution and that developing countries such as Indonesia has a different interpretation of human rights. Tapol described Atmono's rebuttal as an "own goal" and that it "infuriated most of those present". Before the two Indonesian Timorese officials—East Timor vice governor and member of parliament—were given the floor, several MEPs rebuked Atmono's statement as he acted "as if nothing was happening in East Timor" and a Greek MEP censured him for being "vague and unhelpful" with his response.

In response to the introduction of the European single market, Atmono oversaw the establishment of the Indonesian Trade and Distribution Center (ITDC) in Rotterdam, with the aim of sheltering, promote, and distribute Indonesian goods to European Economic Community (EEC) member countries. Atmono viewed the single market's trade barrier as "reasonable" and encouraged Indonesian producers to boost their competitiveness. In a discussion with Indonesian textile merchants, Atmono encourage business associations to support its members and advised businesses to hire European consultants before trading in the region and maintain friendly relations with the EEC authorities. Atmono also admitted the necessity of Indonesia having another harbor as a point of entry for its produce in Europe.

After the EEC implemented a GSP Ceiling (Generalised System of Preferences), which impacted the amount of Indonesian exports, especially bicycles. As the exports entered Europe through the Netherlands, on 6 March 1992 the ambassador in Netherlands Bintoro Tjokroamidjojo urged Atmono to discuss the issue with the EEC.

== Later life ==
After his retirement, Atmono continued his role in diplomacy as a member of the ASEAN-EU Eminent Persons Group, providing recommendations and advice on areas of mutual interest such as the Asia–Europe Meeting. Atmono and other senior diplomats established a discussion group which evolved into the Indonesian Council on World Affairs (ICWA), where he became the organization's daily chairperson until 18 June 2010. In 1999, Atmono supported the restoration of diplomatic relations with Portugal, arguing its necessity as a bridge to enhance relations with the European Union.

Atmono was a member of the board of commissioners of the International Nickel Indonesia company from November 2001 until his resignation on 5 July 2006, and afterwards became the company's advisor for political and economic matters.

Atmono died on the night of 26 October 2016 at his residence in Jakarta. His body was interred at the Karet Bivak Public Cemetery.
