= Rusli Noor =

Indonesian diplomat (born 1927)

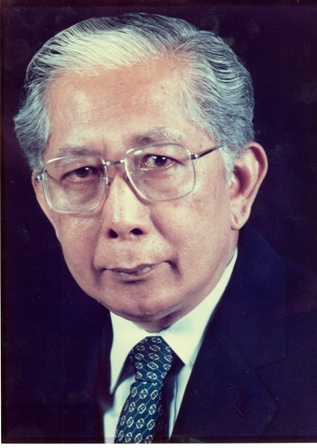

8th Secretary-General of ASEAN
- In office 17 July 1989 – 1 January 1993
- Preceded by: Roderick Yong
- Succeeded by: Ajit Singh

Personal details
- Born: 1 May 1927 (age 99) Bandung, Dutch East Indies
- Education: Columbia University (MA)
- Profession: Diplomat

Rusli Noor (born 1 May 1927) is an Indonesian diplomat who served as the eighth secretary-general of ASEAN between 1989 and 1993. He also served as executive director of the APEC in 1995. and Indonesian Ambassador to Denmark and Norway.

Political offices
Preceded by Roderick Yong	Secretary-General of ASEAN; 1989–1993	Succeeded by Ajit Singh
Incumbent
