= Nguyễn Phương Nga =

Vietnamese diplomat

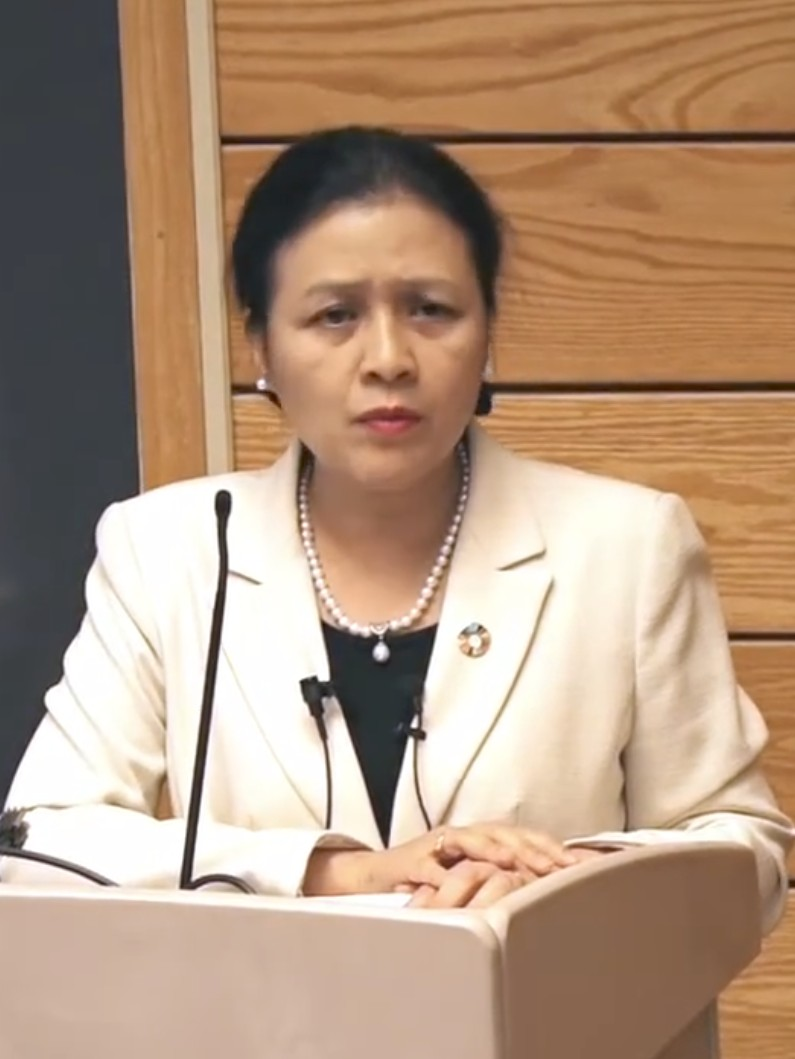
- Mrs. Phương Nga c. 2017

Chairwoman of the Vietnam Union of Friendship Organizations
- In office 10, January 2019 – 31, August 2023
- Preceded by: Vũ Xuân Hồng
- Succeeded by: Phan Anh Sơn

Permanent Representative of Vietnam to the United Nations
- In office 6, November 2014 – 10, October 2018
- Preceded by: Lê Hoài Trung
- Succeeded by: Đặng Đình Quý

Deputy Minister of Foreign Affairs
- In office 12, September 2011 – 10, December 2018
- Minister: Phạm Bình Minh

Director of the Press and Information Department Spokesperson of the Ministry of Foreign Affairs
- In office 20, August 2009 – 12, September2011
- Minister: Phạm Gia Khiêm; Phạm Bình Minh
- Preceded by: Lê Dũng
- Succeeded by: Lương Thanh Nghị

Personal details
- Born: 27 August 1963 (age 63) Hanoi
- Party: Communist Party of Vietnam
- Spouse: Phùng Tất Thắng
- Education: Moscow State University of International Relations

Nguyễn Phương Nga (born 27 August 1963) is a Vietnamese diplomat. She was the Deputy Minister of Foreign Affairs of the Socialist Republic of Vietnam from 2011 until 2018.
