= Bùi Thanh Sơn =

Vietnamese politician

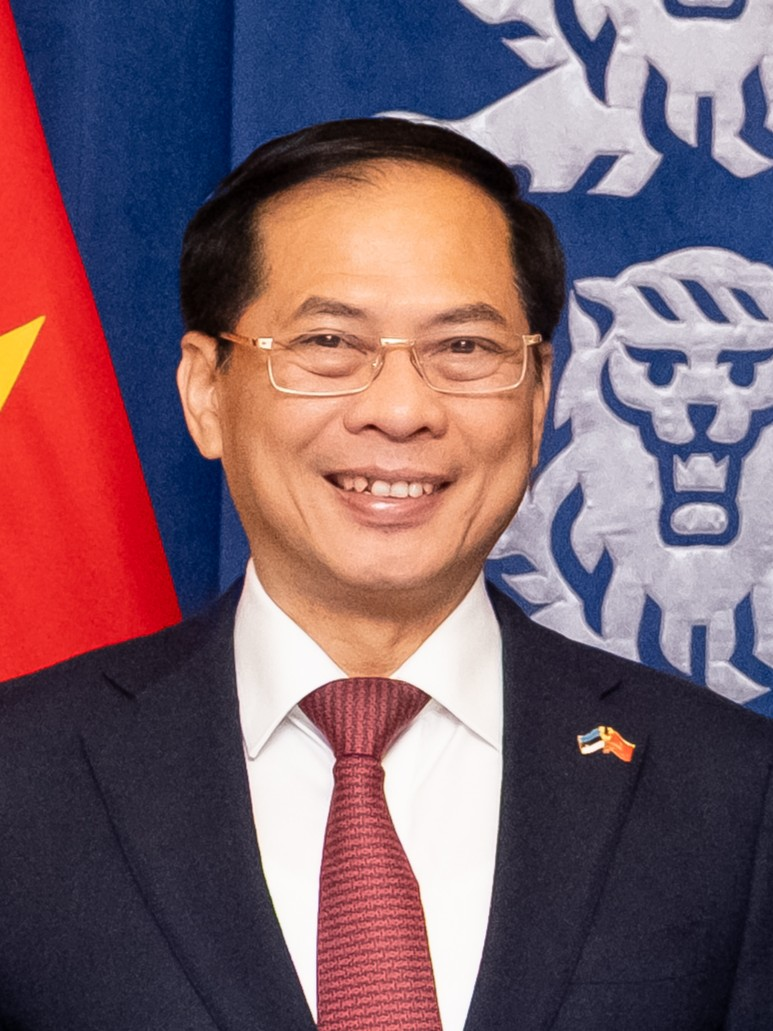
- Bùi Thanh Sơn in 2025

Deputy Prime Minister of Vietnam
- In office August 26, 2024 – April 8, 2026
- Prime Minister: Phạm Minh Chính
- Preceded by: Trần Lưu Quang
- Succeeded by: Phan Văn Giang

13th Minister of Foreign Affairs
- In office April 8, 2021 – August 30, 2025
- Prime Minister: Phạm Minh Chính
- Preceded by: Phạm Bình Minh
- Succeeded by: Lê Hoài Trung

Member of the Central Committee of the Communist Party of Vietnam
- Incumbent
- Assumed office January 26, 2016
- Leader: Nguyễn Phú Trọng; Tô Lâm

Deputy Minister of Foreign Affairs of Vietnam (Permanent)
- In office November 2, 2009 – April 8, 2021
- Minister: Phạm Gia Khiêm; Phạm Bình Minh
- Preceded by: Phạm Bình Minh
- Succeeded by: Nguyễn Minh Vũ

Member of the National Assembly of Vietnam XV
- Incumbent
- Assumed office May 22, 2016
- Chair: Nguyễn Thị Kim Ngân; Vương Đình Huệ; Trần Thanh Mẫn
- Constituency: Vĩnh Phúc

Personal details
- Born: October 16, 1962 (age 63) Tây Mỗ, Từ Liêm, Hà Nội, Democratic Republic of Vietnam
- Party: Communist Party of Vietnam
- Education: Diplomatic Academy of Vietnam (AB); Columbia University (MIA)
- Occupation: Politician, diplomat

Bùi Thanh Sơn (born October 16, 1962, in Hà Nội) is a Vietnamese politician. He served as a Deputy Prime Minister from 2024 to 2026 and Minister of Foreign Affairs from 2021 to 2025. He is also a member of the 13th Central Committee of the Communist Party of Vietnam, a member of the National Assembly for the 15th term (2021–2026), representing the Vĩnh Phúc delegation, a member of the Standing Committee of the Party Committee of Central Agencies Bloc, Secretary of the Party Committee of the Ministry of Foreign Affairs, and a member of the National Defense and Security Council.

== Early life and education ==
Bùi Thanh Sơn was born on October 16, 1962, in Tây Mỗ, Từ Liêm District (now Tây Mỗ Ward, Nam Từ Liêm District), Hà Nội. He currently resides at House A26-BT6, Mỹ Đình 2 urban area, Nam Từ Liêm District, Hà Nội.

He graduated from Ngô Quyền High School, Hải Phòng under the 10/10 system. In 1984, he completed his studies at the Diplomatic University of Vietnam (now the Diplomatic Academy) with a degree in Diplomacy, having attended from 1979 to 1984. From 1991 to 1993, he earned a Master's degree in International Affairs from Columbia University, United States. He is fluent in English and Japanese. Additionally, he has studied Advanced Political Theory.

Bùi Thanh Sơn's early life and education laid the foundation for his distinguished career in Vietnam's foreign affairs.

== Diplomatic and political career ==
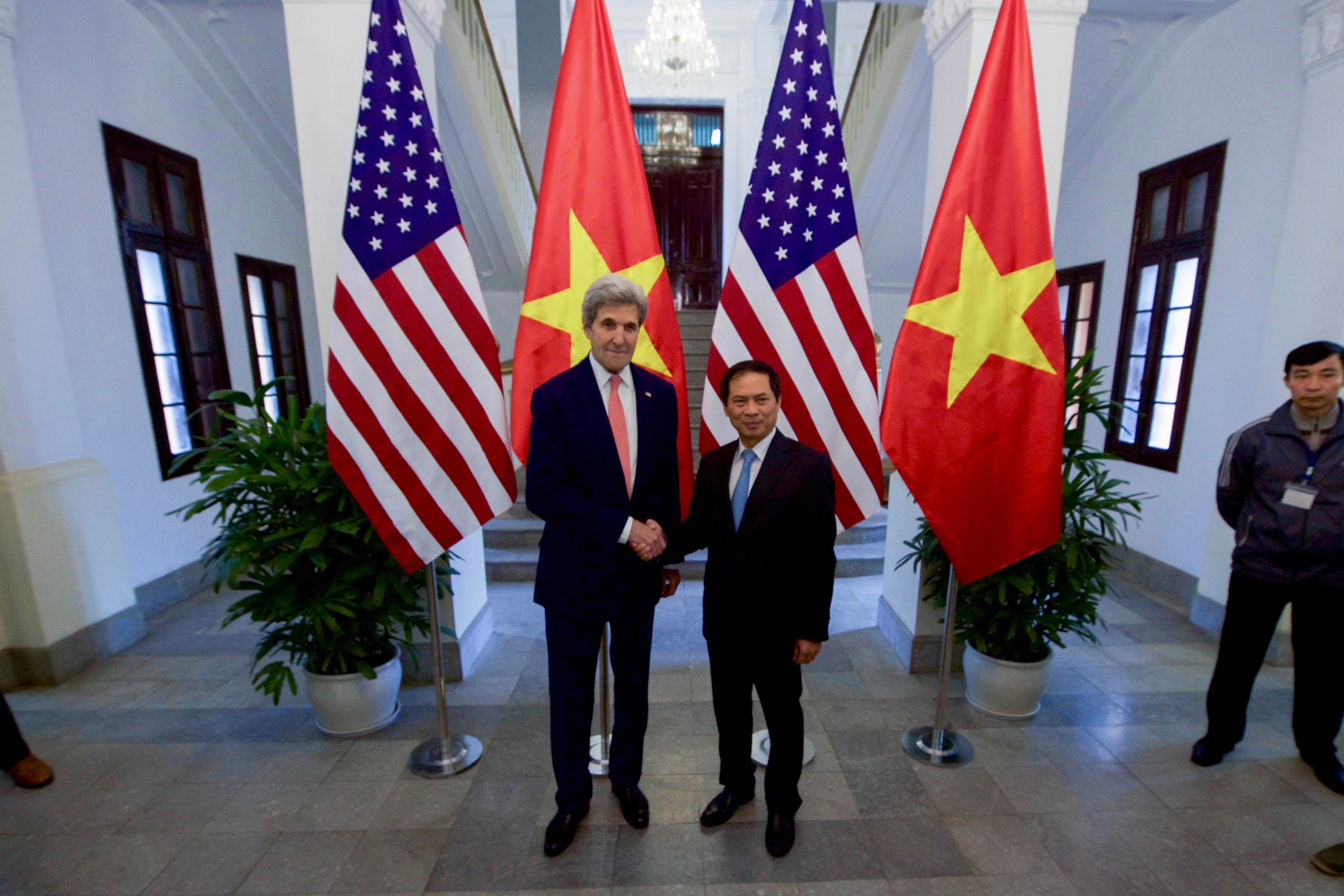
Bui with U.S. Secretary of State John Kerry before a bilateral meeting on January 13, 2017

He joined the Communist Party of Vietnam in 1986 and from September 1987, he started working at the Ministry of Foreign Affairs as a research officer at the Institute of International Relations of Ministry of Foreign Affairs. After that, he was respectively appointed to the positions of Deputy Head, then Head of the Europe – America Department at the Office of Academy of International Relations of the Ministry of Foreign Affairs.

From March 1996 to January 2000, he served as the deputy director of the Institute of International Relations and from March 2000 to July 2003, he worked at the Embassy of Vietnam in Singapore as counselor at the mission. Bui served as deputy director and then Director of Foreign Policy Department at the Ministry of Foreign Affairs from September 2008 to August 2009.

Bui served as the assistant to the Minister of Foreign Affairs and director of the Foreign Policy Department from September 2008 to November 2009. He also concurrently served as the head of the negotiating team for the Comprehensive Partnership and Cooperation Agreement between Vietnam and the European Union until June 2012.

In November 2009, he was appointed Deputy Minister of Foreign Affairs by Prime Minister Nguyen Tan Dung and from November 2010, he concurrently served as a member of the National Committee on Youth in Vietnam. From September 2011 to 2015, he concurrently served as a member of the Central Theoretical Council.

Bui was re-appointed Deputy Minister of Foreign Affairs in February 2015 and from March 2015, he was assigned to be a member and Secretary General of the Inter-sectoral Steering Committee for International Integration in Politics, Security and Defense. In January 2016 at the 12th National Congress of the Communist Party of Vietnam, he was elected to the 12th Central Committee of the Communist Party of Vietnam.

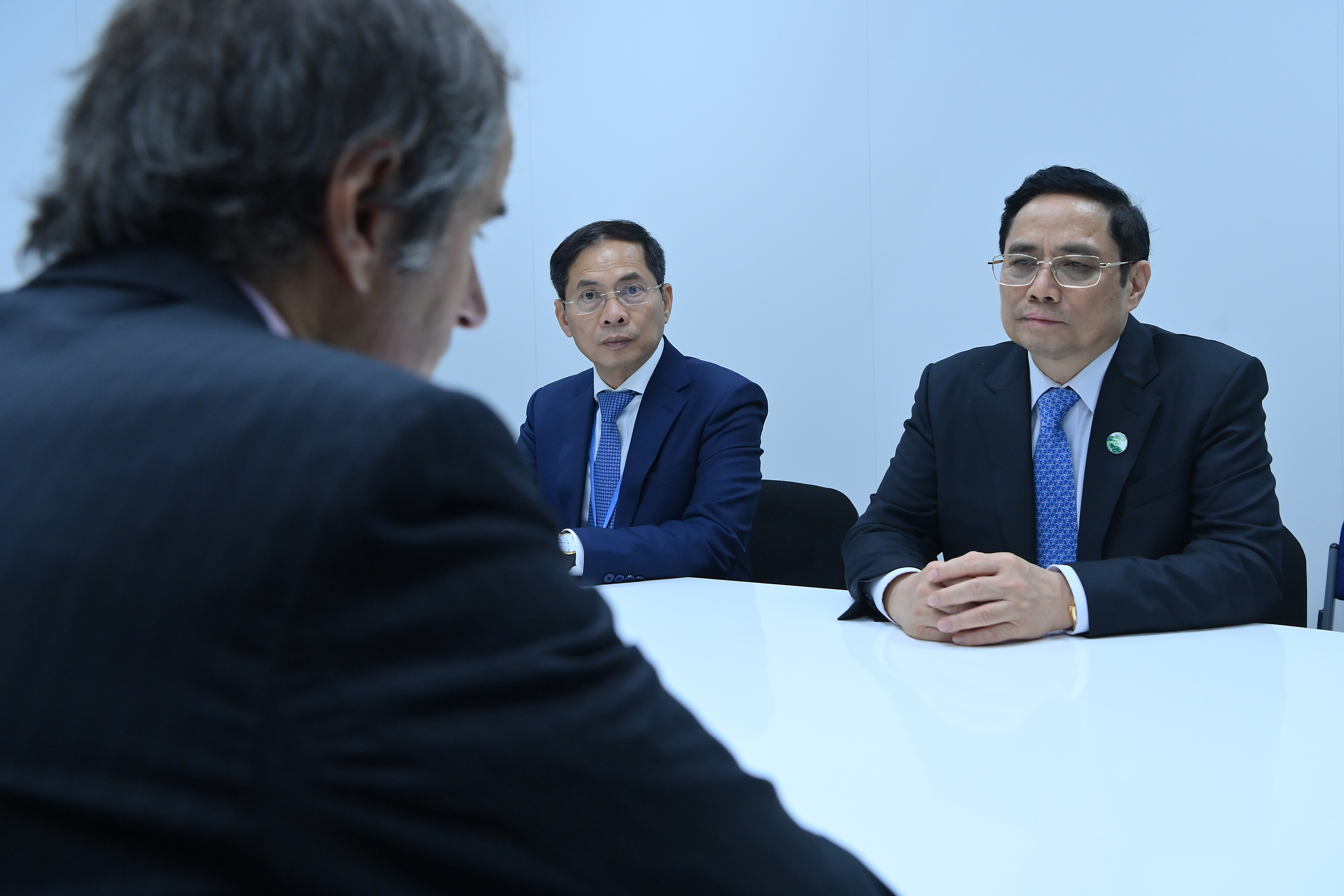
Bui (left) and Prime Minister of Vietnam Pham Minh Chinh (right) meeting with the Director General of IAEA Rafael Mariano Grossi during the COP26 Climate Change Conference 2021 in Glasgow

In May 2016, he was first introduced by the central government to be a candidate for the 14th National Assembly. He was a member of the 12th Central Committee of the Communist Party of Vietnam, the executive committee of the Communist Party of Vietnam, Executive of the Party Committee of Central Agencies, Member of the Party Personnel Committee of the Ministry of Foreign Affairs, Secretary of the Party Committee of the Ministry of Foreign Affairs and Deputy Minister of Foreign Affairs. On the same month, he was first elected as a member of the National Assembly in 2016 from constituency no. 2 at Đắk Nông Province, with 140,073 votes. During this time, he held the following positions: Member of the Party Central Committee, Secretary of the Party Committee and Standing Deputy Minister of Foreign Affairs.

In April 2020, he was re-appointed to the position of Deputy Minister of Foreign Affairs with period starting from February 10, 2020. This was the third time he has been appointed by the Prime Minister. On January 30, 2021, at the 13th National Congress of the Communist Party of Vietnam, he was elected as an official member of the Central Committee of the Communist Party of Vietnam for 13th term.

=== Minister of Foreign Affairs ===
On April 8, 2021, he was elected Minister of Foreign Affairs by the XIV National Assembly of Vietnam at the proposal of Prime Minister Pham Minh Chinh.

On July 6, 2022, he met with Russian Foreign Minister Sergey Lavrov in Hanoi. Lavrov called Vietnam a "key partner" of Russia in ASEAN.

== Personal life ==
Bui is married and has a son.

== Awards and honors ==
- Vietnam:
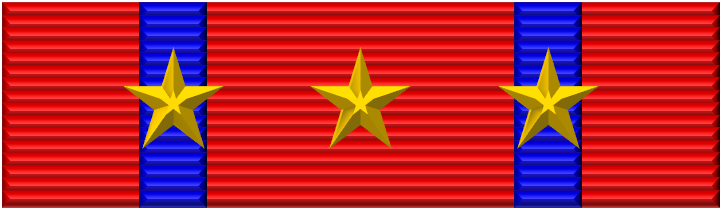
  - Labor Order (2011)
  - Certificate of Merit from the Ministry of Foreign Affairs (2005)
  - Certificate of Merit from the Prime Minister, twice (2009, 2011)
- Laos:
  - Isala Order (2014)

== See also ==
- List of foreign ministers in 2022
- List of current foreign ministers
