= Lê Hoài Trung =

Vietnamese diplomat and politician

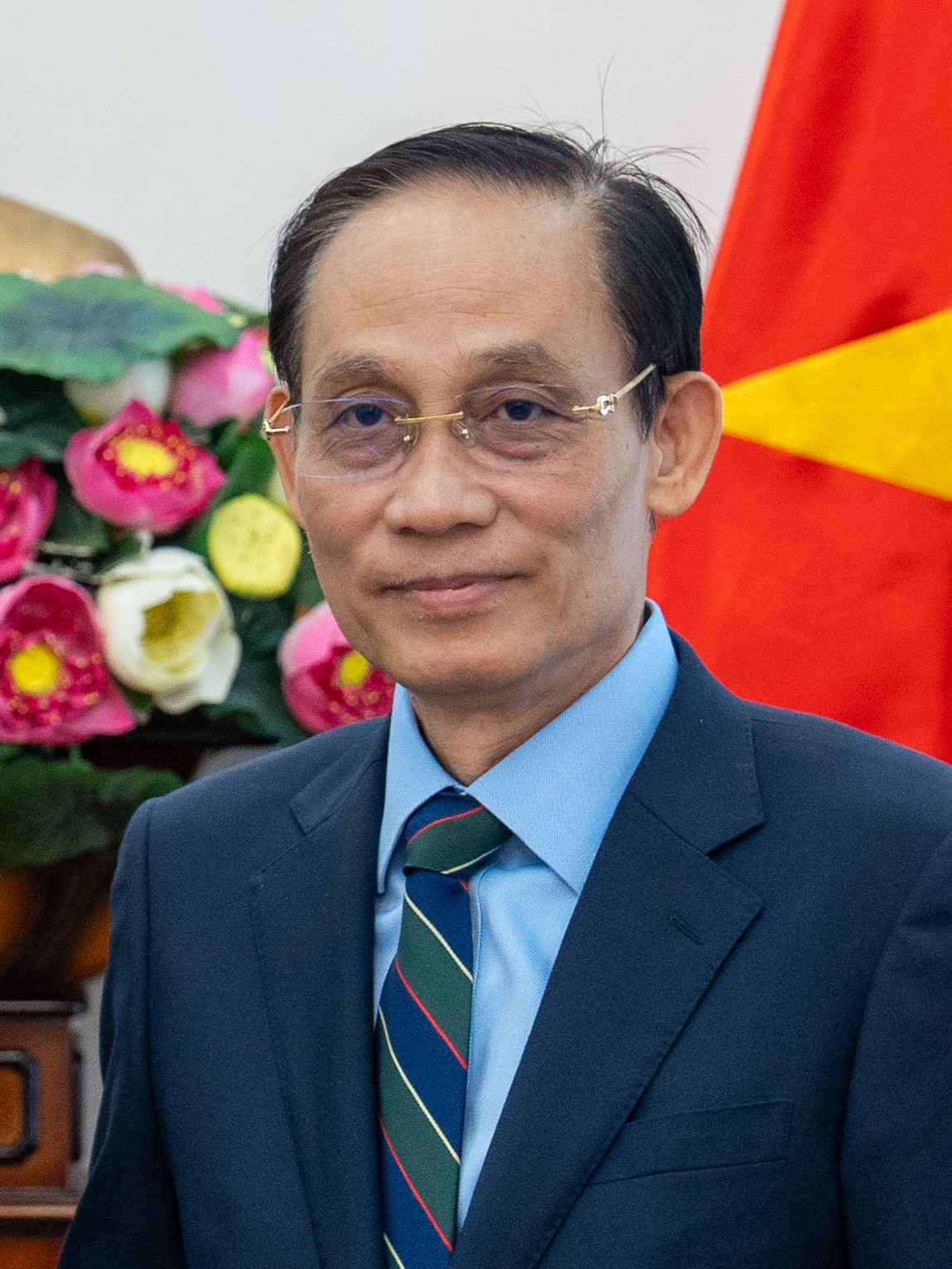
- Trung in 2026

14th Minister of Foreign Affairs
- Incumbent
- Assumed office 25 October 2025 (Note: Acting from 30 August to 24 October 2025)
- President: Lương Cường; Tô Lâm
- Prime Minister: Phạm Minh Chính; Lê Minh Hưng
- Preceded by: Bùi Thanh Sơn

Chief of Office of Party Central Committee
- In office 3 February 2025 – 29 August 2025
- General Secretary: Tô Lâm
- Preceded by: Nguyễn Duy Ngọc
- Succeeded by: Phạm Gia Túc

Head of the Central External Relations Commission
- In office 19 March 2021 – 3 February 2025
- General Secretary: Nguyễn Phú Trọng; Tô Lâm
- Preceded by: Hoàng Bình Quân
- Succeeded by: Abolished position

Deputy Minister of Foreign Affairs
- In office 5 November 2014 – 19 March 2021
- Minister: Phạm Bình Minh
- In office 29 December 2010 – 1 February 2011
- Minister: Phạm Gia Khiêm

Permanent Representative of Vietnam to the United Nations
- In office 1 February 2011 – 5 November 2014
- Preceded by: Lê Lương Minh
- Succeeded by: Nguyễn Phương Nga

Personal details
- Born: 27 April 1961 (age 65) Huế, South Vietnam
- Party: Communist Party of Vietnam
- Education: Diplomatic Academy of Vietnam
- Occupation: Politician; diplomat

Lê Hoài Trung (born 27 April 1961) is a Vietnamese politician and diplomat who has served as the 14th Minister of Foreign Affairs since 2025. He previously served as Deputy Minister of Foreign Affairs from 2010 to 2011 and again from 2014 to 2021.

== Early life ==
Lê Hoài Trung was born in April 1961. He joined the Communist Party of Vietnam in 1986.

== Career ==
Trung served as Deputy Minister of Foreign Affairs from 2010 to 2011 and again from 2014 to 2021. He was appointed acting Minister of Foreign Affairs in August 2025, before he was formally appointed to the position on 25 October.
