= Central External Relations Commission of the Communist Party of Vietnam =

Vietnamese foreign affairs government agency

The Central External Relations Commission (Vietnamese: Ban Đối ngoại Trung ương Đảng Cộng sản Việt Nam) was an administrative agency of the Central Committee of the Communist Party of Vietnam (CPV), directly and regularly assisting the Politburo and the Central Secretariat in the field of foreign affairs, organizing and implementing the Party's foreign relations, and managing the unified foreign affairs activities within the system of Party agencies, mass organizations, and people's organizations.

== History ==
On November 1, 1949, at a meeting of the Central Party Standing Committee, a resolution was passed to establish the Central Laos-Cambodia Office as the Party's specialized foreign affairs agency. Nguyen Chi Thanh was appointed to head the office. From 1953 to August 1955, Pham Van Dong was appointed in charge, Nguyen Chan was the head of department, and Nguyen Van Hong was the deputy head of department. In 1955, the department was renamed the Central Committee for Laos and Cambodia, and in 1957, it was renamed the Central Committee for Border Affairs, with the task of expanding its support to the Central Committee in handling relations with other parties around the world. In 1958, the Central Party Secretariat decided to establish the Central Committee for Foreign Affairs Liaison, and Minister of Foreign Affairs Ung Van Khiem was appointed as its head. On March 7, 1960, the Central Secretariat issued a resolution establishing the Central Committee for Foreign Affairs. On January 28, 1983, the Central Party Secretariat issued Decision No. 17/QD-TW renaming it the Central Committee's Foreign Affairs Department. In early 2025, it was decided that the commission would be merged into the Ministry of Foreign Affairs of Vietnam. The Central Foreign Affairs Department officially ceased operations on February 3, 2025.

== Organizational structure ==
- Department of China and Northeast Asia
- Department of Laos and Cambodia
- Department of Southeast Asia, South Asia, and South Pacific
- Department of European Affairs
- Department of the Americas
- Department of Middle East - Africa
- Department of Comprehensive Research
- People's Diplomacy Department
- Information and Documentation Department
- Protocol Department
- Department of Organization and Personnel
- Office of the Board

== Leaders ==
| Full name | Term | |
| Full name | Begin | End |
|---|---|---|
| General Nguyen Chi Thanh | November 1, 1949 | September 1954 |
| Pham Van Dong | September 1954 | August 1955 |
| Le Duc Tho | August 1955 | 1957 |
| Pham Hung | 1957 | May 1958 |
| Ung Van Khiem | May 1958 | March 1960 |
| Pham Van Dong | March 1960 | June 1961 |
| Hoang Van Hoan | June 1961 | April 1966 |
| Xuan Thuy | April 1966 | December 1979 |
| Nguyen Thanh Le | December 1979 | March 31, 1982 |
| Vu Quang | March 31, 1982 | December 18, 1986 |
| Hoang Bich Son | December 18, 1986 | June 27, 1991 |
| Hong Ha | June 27, 1991 | July 1, 1996 |
| Nguyen Van Son | July 1, 1996 | August 13, 2007 |
| Tran Van Hang | August 13, 2007 | June 18, 2009 |
| Hoang Binh Quan | June 25, 2009 | 18 March 2021 |
| Lê Hoài Trung | 19 March 2021 | 3 February 2025 |

== See also ==
- Office of the Central Foreign Affairs Commission
- International Department of the Communist Party of the Soviet Union
