= Minister of Foreign Affairs (Vietnam) =

Foreign minister of Vietnam

Minister of Foreign Affairs of Vietnam
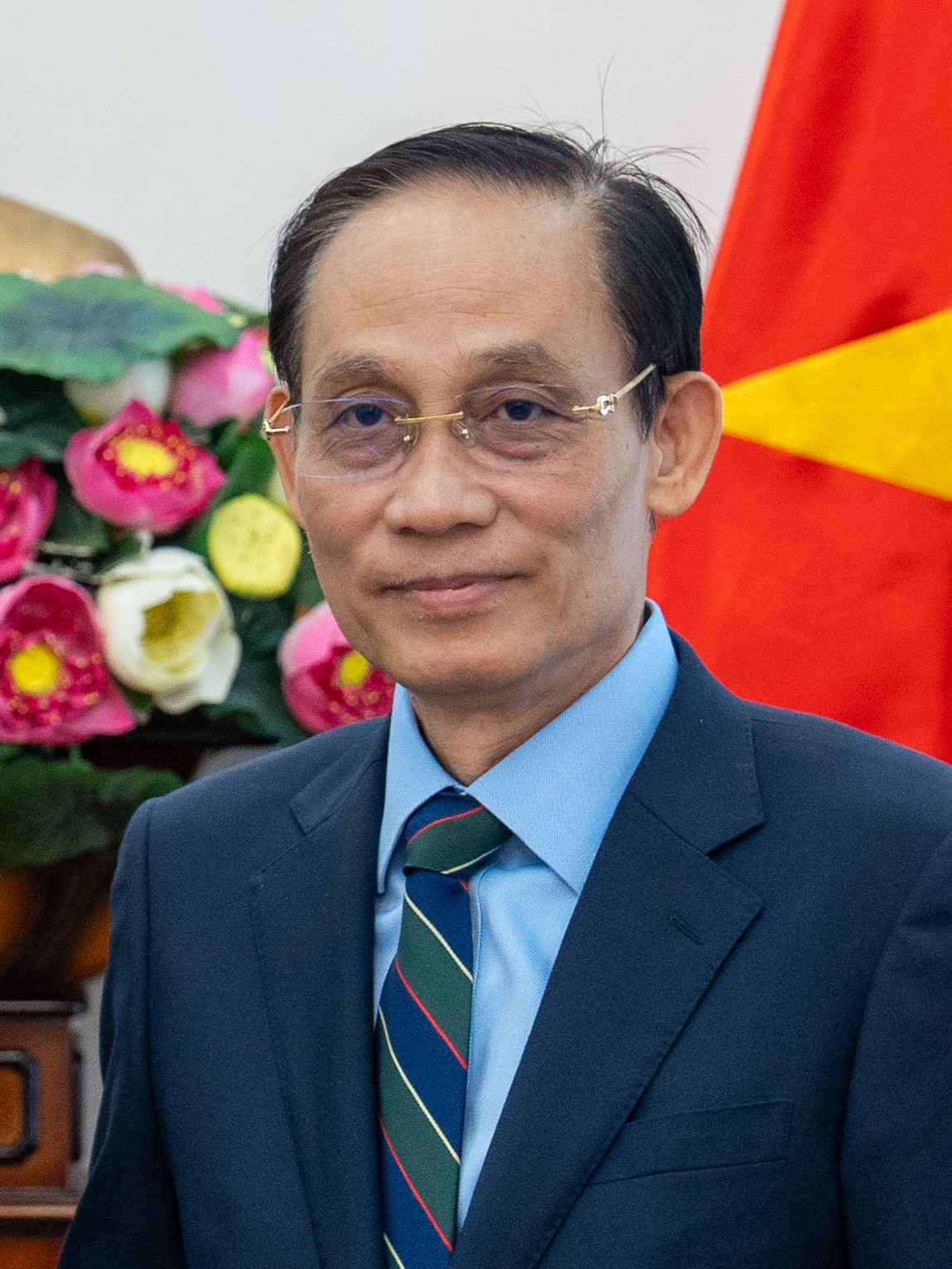
- Incumbent; Lê Hoài Trung since October 25, 2025
- Ministry of Foreign Affairs
- Style: His Excellency
- Member of: Cabinet; Council for National Defense and Security
- Reports to: The president The prime minister
- Appointer: The president
- Term length: No fixed term
- Inaugural holder: Hồ Chí Minh
- Formation: August 28,1945
- Succession: Fifth
- Deputy: Vice Minister of Foreign Affairs
- Website: mofa.gov.vn

The Minister of Foreign Affairs is the Government of Vietnam's cabinet member in charge of the Ministry of Foreign Affairs. Moreover, member of Council for National Defense and Security. Since 2007, the Minister of Foreign Affairs served as Deputy Prime Minister and sometimes a member of the Politburo, making this ministership one of the highest ranking members in the Vietnamese cabinet. The current Vietnamese Minister of Foreign Affairs is Lê Hoài Trung.

== List of ministers ==
This is a list of ministers of foreign affairs of the Socialist Republic of Vietnam and its historical antecedents:

=== Empire of Vietnam ===
No	Image	Name (Birth–Death)	Took office	Left office	Time in office
1		Trần Văn Chương (1898–1986)	April 17, 1945	August 23, 1945	129 days

=== Democratic Republic of Vietnam ===
No	Image	Name (Birth–Death)	Took office	Left office	Time in office
1		Hồ Chí Minh (1890–1969); 1st term	August 28, 1945	March 2, 1946	187 days
2		Nhất Linh (1906–1963) (Note: Abandoned his post.)	March 2, 1946	November 3, 1946	247 days
1		Hồ Chí Minh (1890–1969); 2nd term	November 3, 1946	March 1, 1947	119 days
3		Hoàng Minh Giám (1904–1995)	March 1947	October 1954	
4		Phạm Văn Đồng (1906–2000)	October 1954	February 1961	
5		Ung Văn Khiêm (1910–1991) (Note: Removed for "pro-Soviet sentiments")	February 1, 1961	April 30, 1963	2 years, 89 days
6		Xuân Thủy (1912–1985)	April 30, 1963	April 1, 1965	1 year, 337 days
7		Nguyễn Duy Trinh (1910–1985)	April 1, 1965	February 7, 1980	14 years, 313 days

=== Provisional Revolutionary Government of the Republic of South Vietnam ===
No	Image	Name (Birth–Death)	Took office	Left office	Time in office
1		Nguyễn Thị Bình (born 1927)	June 8, 1969	July 3, 1976	7 years, 26 days

=== Socialist Republic of Vietnam ===
No	Image	Name (Birth–Death)	Took office	Left office	Time in office
7		Nguyễn Duy Trinh (1910–1985)	April 1, 1965	February 7, 1980	14 years, 313 days
8		Nguyễn Cơ Thạch (1921–1998)	February 7, 1980	August 9, 1991	11 years, 184 days
9		Nguyễn Mạnh Cầm (born 1929)	August 9, 1991	February 28, 2000	8 years, 173 days
10		Nguyễn Dy Niên (born 1935)	January 28, 2000	June 28, 2006	6 years, 152 days
11		Phạm Gia Khiêm (born 1944)	June 28, 2006	August 3, 2011	4 years, 254 days
12		Phạm Bình Minh (born 1959)	August 3, 2011	April 8, 2021	9 years, 249 days
13		Bùi Thanh Sơn (born 1962)	April 8, 2021	August 30, 2025	4 years, 145 days
14		Lê Hoài Trung (born 1961)	October 25, 2025; Acting: August 30: October 25, 2025	Present	1 year, 9 days

== See also ==
- Minister of Foreign Affairs (South Vietnam)
