= Lim Jock Hoi =

Bruneian diplomat (born 1951)

Dato Seri Paduka Lim Jock Hoi SPMB SNB PKIB PKL
- 林玉輝
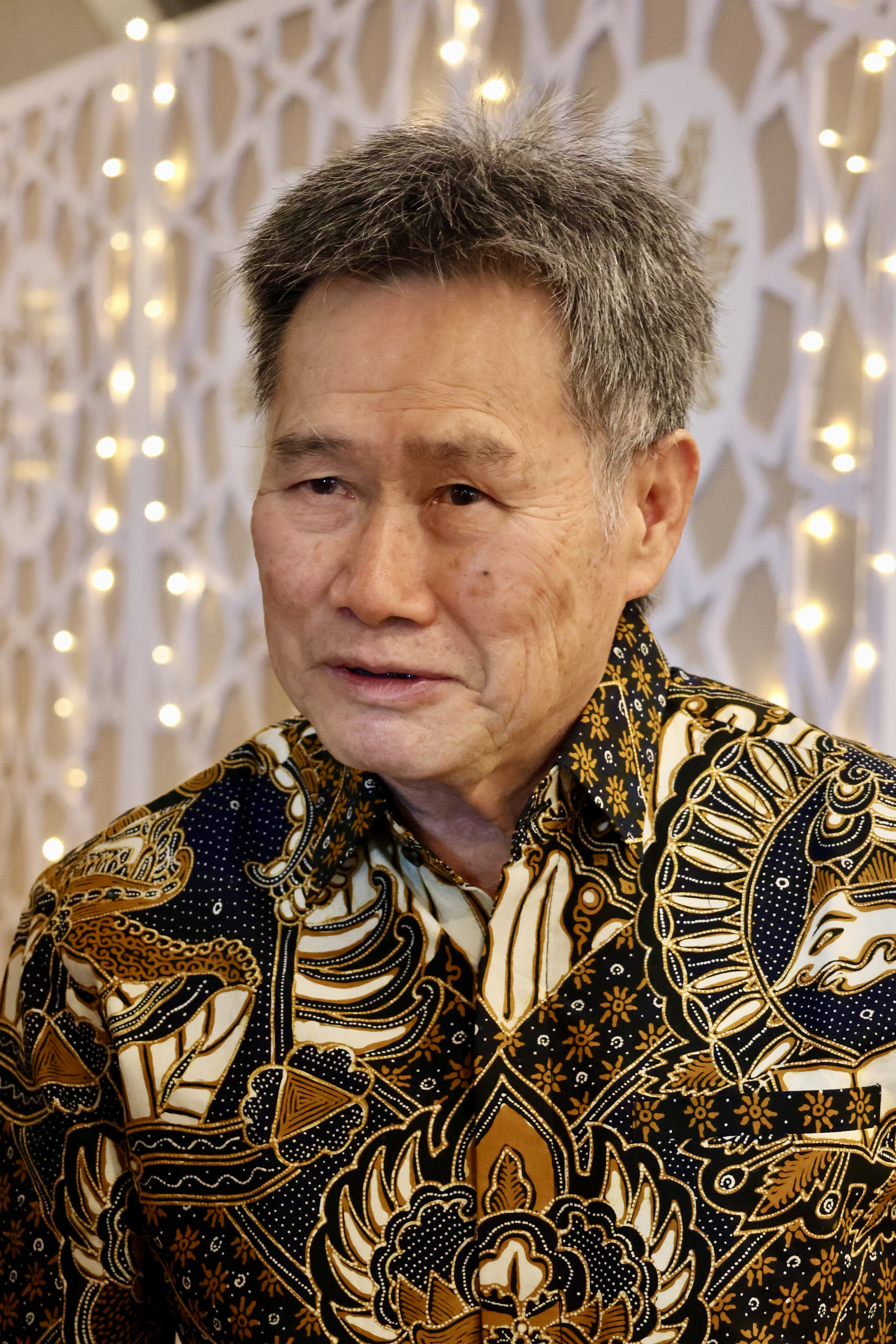
- Dato Lim in 2024

14th Secretary-General of ASEAN
- In office 1 January 2018 – 31 December 2022
- Preceded by: Lê Lương Minh
- Succeeded by: Kao Kim Hourn

Personal details
- Born: Lim Jock Hoi; 5 December 1951 (age 74) Brunei
- Spouse: Chan Chin Ming
- Relations: Lim Jock Seng (brother)
- Education: City of London Polytechnic (BSc); Keele University (PGCE)
- Occupation: Civil servant; diplomat

Chinese name
- Simplified Chinese: 林玉辉
- Traditional Chinese: 林玉輝
Transcriptions
Standard Mandarin
- Hanyu Pinyin: Lín Yùhuī
Southern Min
- Hokkien POJ: Lîm Gio̍k-hui
- Lim Jock Hoi's voice Lim Jock Hoi on the Covid-19 Pandemic in Southeast Asia; Recorded 20 September 2021

Lim Jock Hoi (Chinese: 林玉輝; pinyin: Lín Yùhuī; Pe̍h-ōe-jī: Lîm Gio̍k-hui; born 5 December 1951), also referred to as Dato Jock Hoi, is a Bruneian politician and diplomat who served as the 14th secretary-general of ASEAN between 2018 and 2022. He previously served as the permanent secretary of the Ministry of Foreign Affairs and Trade, Brunei.

== Education ==
Lim earned his Bachelor of Science (Hons) in Economics from the City of London Polytechnic in 1976, and his Post Graduate Certificate of Education from Keele University in 1977.

== Political career ==
Lim joined the government service in 1977 as a lecturer in the education department, and from 1981 and 1985 he was the principal of a secondary school. He served as the Ministry of Industry and Primary Resources' Director-General for International Relations and Trade Development from February 2001 to July 2005. He was appointed as the Ministry of Foreign Affairs and Trade's (MOFAT) Director-General of International Relation and Trade Development as deputy permanent secretary on 7 September 2005.

Lim represented Brunei as the Senior Official for the ASEAN Economic Community Pillar (SEOM), the Asia-Pacific Economic Cooperation (APEC), and the Asia-Europe Meeting (ASEM) throughout his time in office. Since 2001, he has been a member of the High Level Task Force on ASEAN Economic Integration (HLTF-EI), and in 2017, he served as its chair. He served as Brunei's chief negotiator for both the P4 negotiations, which preceded the TPP negotiations, and the Trans-Pacific Partnership Agreement (TPP). Prior to that, he served as both the Co-Chair and Chief Negotiator for Brunei during the discussions for the ASEAN-Australia-New Zealand Free Trade Area (AANZFTA) and the Brunei Darussalam-Japan Economic Partnership Agreement (BJEPA). He presided over the board of the Economic Research Institute for ASEAN and East Asia (ERIA) from June 2011 to June 2017. He served on the Asian Development Bank's (ADB) External Advisory Board for the ASEAN 2030 Study.

Following a declaration by Singaporean Prime Minister Lee Hsien Loong on 18 November 2017, Lim would be in charge of the ASEAN Secretariat in Jakarta. On 14 November, Lee announced his selection as the new ASEAN secretary-general in a speech marking the beginning of Singapore's 2018 chairmanship of the 10-nation organization. Lê Lương Minh of Vietnam, the current ASEAN Secretary-General, will be replaced on 5 January 2018 by Dato Lim. Retno Marsudi, Dato Lim, Anies Baswedan, and other attendees attended the groundbreaking ceremony on the same day to commemorate the Government of Indonesia's construction of the new ASEAN Secretariat building.

Several regional and worldwide crises have occurred during his tenure, ranging from the COVID-19 epidemic and the ongoing conflict in Myanmar to the global repercussions of Russian invasion of Ukraine. Dato Lim left depart office at the end of December 2022 after serving as the organization's top diplomat for five years.

== Personal positions ==
=== ASEAN Community Vision 2025 ===
The ASEAN agenda for the period after 2025 should be more dynamic and able to introduce new initiatives and put policies into place in response to shifting market and economic conditions, according to Dato Lim, who wrote the article that appeared in the Jakarta Post on 31 December 2022. He stated:

This is because of the global and regional headwinds that impact the future of the ASEAN community, including problems like global trade tensions, climate change, the digital divide and even the pandemic. Taken together, these challenges have exposed gaps or weaknesses in the ability of ASEAN to address some of its goals, such as participation in global value chains, enhancement of macro-financial coordination and narrowing development gaps

— Dato Paduka Lim Jock Hoi, Jakarta Post

=== ASEAN-EU Strategic Partnership ===
Dato Lim expressed his satisfaction with the strengthening of ASEAN-EU cooperation during the previous 44 years in an interview from 2021. In addition to a commemorative summit in Brussels to celebrate the occasion and offer strategic direction to further realise the potential of both regions, he looks forward to further solidifying our strategic relations through real and practical cooperation as 2022 marks the 45th anniversary of the ASEANEU Dialogue Relations.

== Personal life ==
Dato Lim is married to Datin Chan Chin Ming, together they have two sons.

== Honours ==
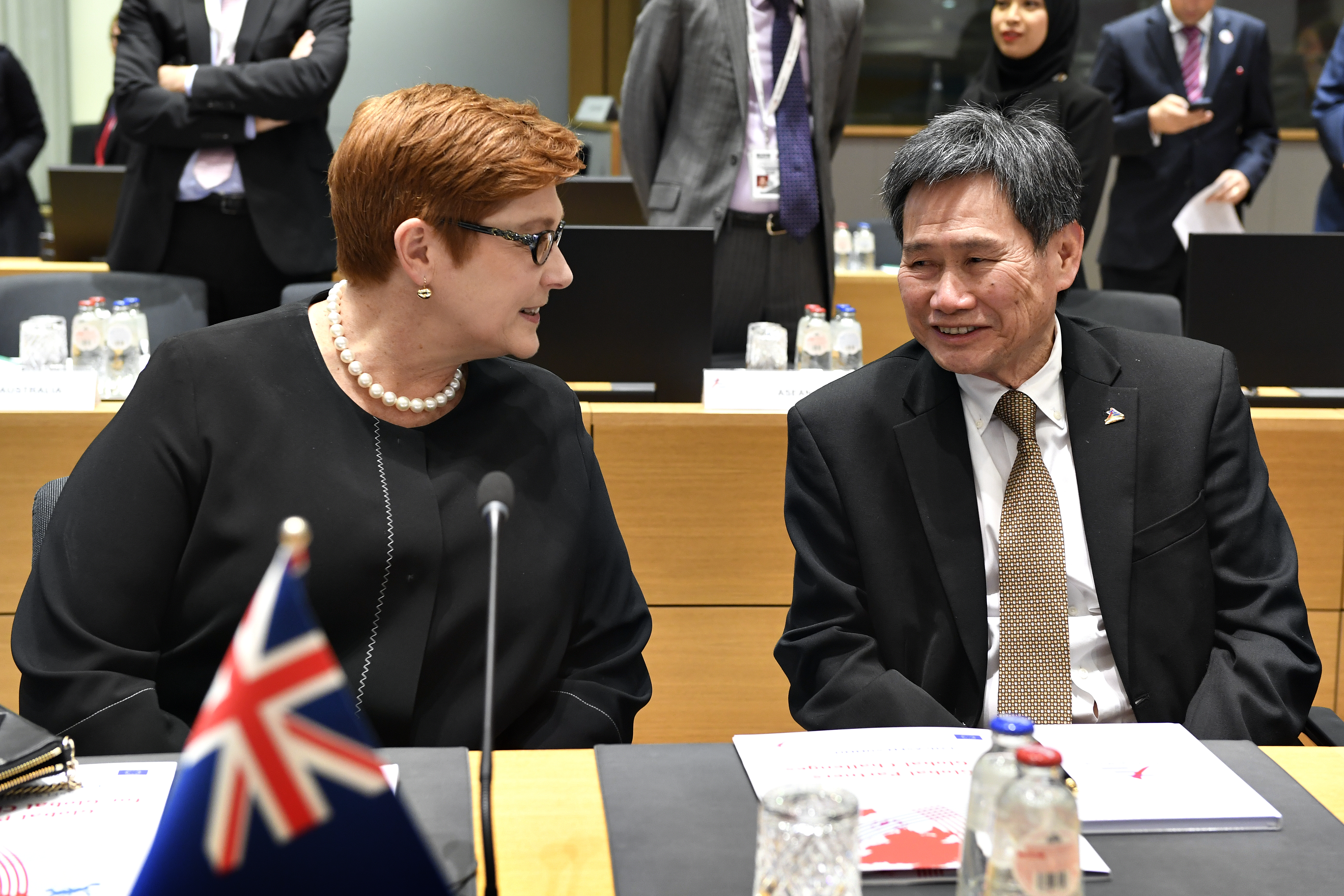
Marise Payne and Dato Lim during the 2018 Asia-Europe Summit

The Republic of Korea government awarded Dato Lim the Order of Diplomatic Service Merit on 6 April 2022, in recognition of his outstanding efforts to fortify ties and advance meaningful collaboration between South Korea and ASEAN in a number of fields. Later on 13 November, Hun Sen awarded him the Royal Order of Sahametrei of the Government of Cambodia in appreciation of his commitment and unwavering efforts in the process of constructing the ASEAN Community while he served as the ASEAN secretary general. During the Spring Conferment of Decorations on Foreign Nationals on 29 April 2024, the Japanese government awarded Dato Lim the Order of the Rising Sun in recognition of his noteworthy achievements to promoting positive ties between Japan and ASEAN.

Throughout his career, he has achieved the following honours:

=== National ===
- Order of Seri Paduka Mahkota Brunei First Class (SPMB; 2023) – Dato Seri Paduka
- Order of Seri Paduka Mahkota Brunei Second Class (DPMB; 15 July 2007) – Dato Paduka
- Order of Seri Paduka Mahkota Brunei Third Class (SMB; 1995)
- Order of Setia Negara Brunei Third Class (SNB; 2000)
- Order of Setia Negara Brunei Fourth Class (PSB; 15 July 1990)
- Long Service Medal (PKL; 2001)
- Excellent Service Medal (PIKB; 1987)

=== Foreign ===
- Japan:
  - Order of the Rising Sun Second Class (29 April 2024)
- South Korea:
  - Order of Diplomatic Service Merit Second Grade (6 April 2022)
- Cambodia:
  - Grand Cross of the Royal Order of Sahametrei (13 November 2022)

Political offices
Preceded by Lê Lương Minh	Secretary-General of ASEAN; 2018–2022	Succeeded by Kao Kim Hourn
Incumbent
