= Nguyễn Hoàng Long =

Vietnamese diplomat

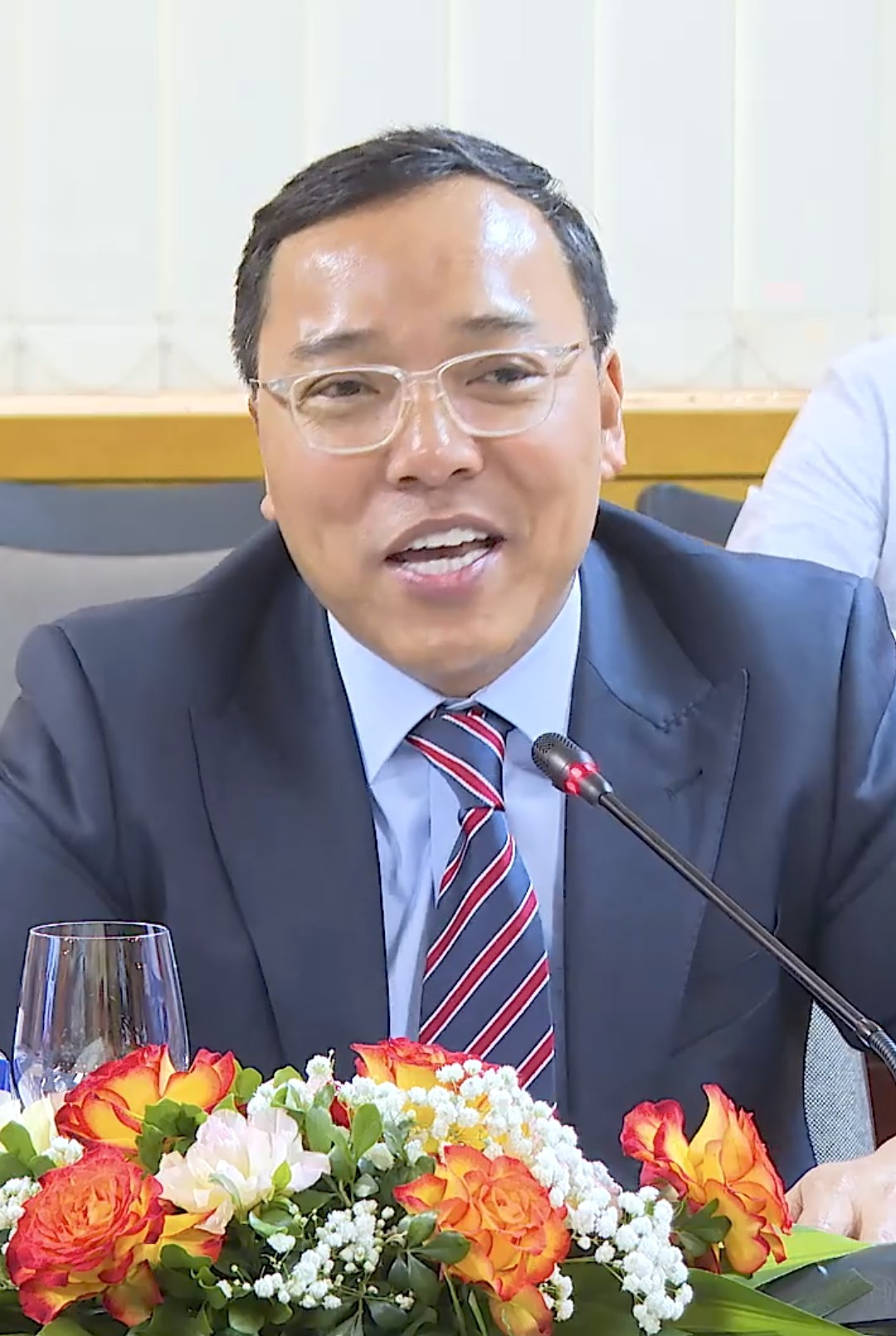
- Nguyễn Hoàng Long in June 2024

Deputy Minister of Foreign Affairs
- Incumbent
- Assumed office 29 July 2026

Deputy Minister of Industry and Trade
- In office 10 June 2024 – 29 July 2026
- Preceded by: Trần Ngọc An
- Succeeded by: Đỗ Minh Hùng

Ambassador of Vietnam to the United Kingdom
- In office June 2021 – June 2024

Personal details
- Born: April 19, 1976 (age 50)
- Parent: Nguyễn Mạnh Dũng
- Education: D.Ec University of Rome Tor Vergata
- Occupation: Diplomat

Nguyễn Hoàng Long (born 19 April 1976) is a Vietnamese diplomat, currently serving as Deputy Minister of Foreign Affairs. He previously served as Deputy Minister of Industry and Trade from 2024 to 2026, and the ambassador of Vietnam to the United Kingdom and Ireland from 2021 to 2024. He presented his credentials to Queen Elizabeth II on 18 November 2021. On 11 July 23, he inaugurated the Honorary Consulate Office of Vietnam in Dublin. He served as Ambassador of Vietnam to Italy from 2012 to 2015.

== Biography ==
Nguyễn Hoàng Long born on 19 April 1976 in Hanoi. His father, Vietnamese diplomat Nguyễn Mạnh Dũng, also was Ambassador of Vietnam to Italy from 1993 to 1996.

== Career ==
A career diplomat, Nguyễn has served in the Ministry of Foreign Affairs since 1999.

In October 2014, World Economic Forum listed Hoàng Long as one of Young Global Leaders.
