= Surin Pitsuwan =

Thai politician (1949–2017)

Surin Pitsuwan MPCh MVM PSM
- สุรินทร์ พิศสุวรรณ سورين ڤيتسووان
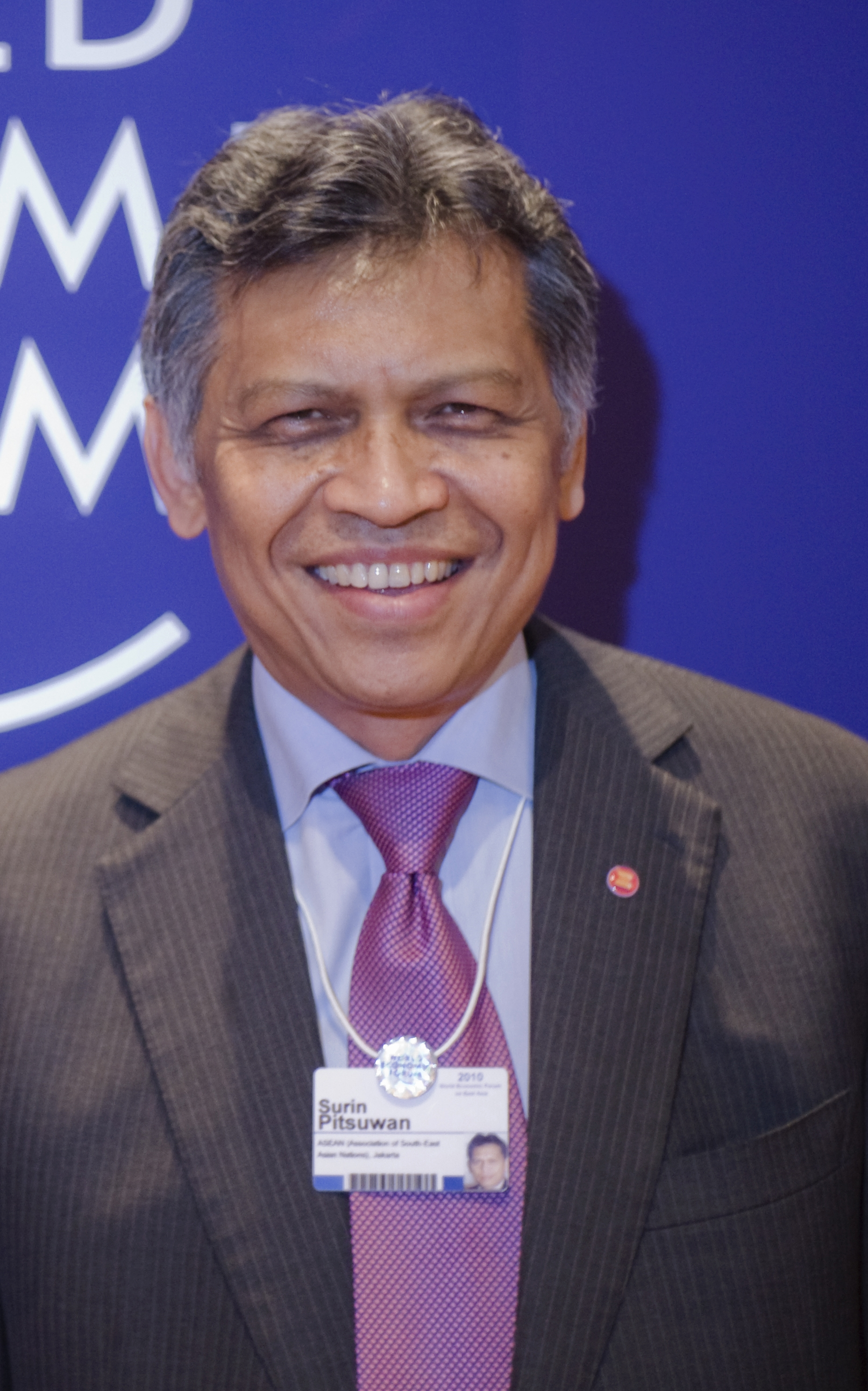
- Surin in 2010

12th Secretary-General of ASEAN
- In office 1 January 2008 – 31 December 2012
- Preceded by: Ong Keng Yong
- Succeeded by: Lê Lương Minh

Minister of Foreign Affairs
- In office 14 November 1997 – 14 February 2001
- Prime Minister: Chuan Leekpai
- Preceded by: Prachuab Chaiyasan
- Succeeded by: Surakiart Sathirathai

Personal details
- Born: 28 October 1949 Nakhon Si Thammarat, Thailand
- Died: 30 November 2017 (aged 68) Bangkok, Thailand
- Party: Democrat Party
- Spouse: Alisa Pitsuwan
- Education: Thammasat University; Claremont McKenna College; Harvard University (MA, PhD)
- Occupation: Diplomat; politician
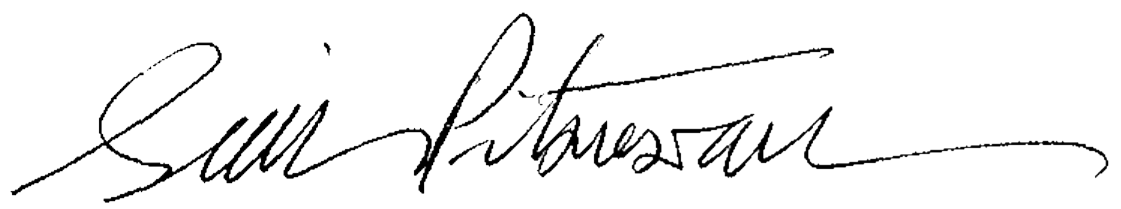
- Signature
- Website: Archived 8 August 2018 at the Wayback Machine
- Surin Pitsuwan's voice Surin speaking on ASEAN's rise Recorded 20 September 2012

Surin Abdul Halim bin Ismail Pitsuwan (Thai: สุรินทร์ พิศสุวรรณ, RTGS: Surin Phitsuwan, Jawi: سورين عبدالحاليم بن اسماعيل ڤيتسووان; October 28, 1949 – November 30, 2017) was a Thai diplomat and politician of Malay descent who served as the 12th secretary-general of ASEAN between 2008 and 2012.

== Early years ==
Surin studied at Thammasat University, Thailand, where he received his BA in political science. He graduated cum laude from Claremont Mens College, California, in political science in 1972. With the support of the Rockefeller Foundation, he went on to pursue his studies at Harvard University, receiving his MA in 1974. He spent one and a half years studying Arabic and doing research at the American University in Cairo, Egypt, from 1975 to 1977. From 1977 to 1980, he was a researcher for the Human Rights Studies Program, Thai Studies Institute, and the Ford Foundation at Thammasat University. He became a congressional fellow under the sponsorship of the American Political Science Association (APSA) from 1983 to 1984, working in the US capitol. During this period he taught international relations at the American University in Washington, D.C. He returned to Harvard to complete his PhD in 1982. His dissertation was entitled, Islam and Malay Nationalism.

== Political career ==
Surin Pitsuwan was elected member of parliament from Nakhon Si Thammarat for the first time in 1986 and became secretary to the Speaker of the House of Representatives the same year. In 1988, he was appointed assistant secretary to the Minister of Interior. From 1992 until 1995, he served as Deputy Minister of Foreign Affairs before becoming Minister of Foreign Affairs in 1997, serving in this capacity until 2001. Surin Pitsuwan was chairman of the Association of Southeast Asian Nations (ASEAN) Regional Forum from 1999 until 2000.

In addition to his political career, Surin taught at Thammasat University and wrote for two English daily newspapers in Bangkok between 1980 and 1992. He was academic assistant to the Dean of the Faculty of Political Science and later to the Vice Rector for Academic Affairs at Thammasat University from 1985 to 1986.

== ASEAN Secretary-General ==
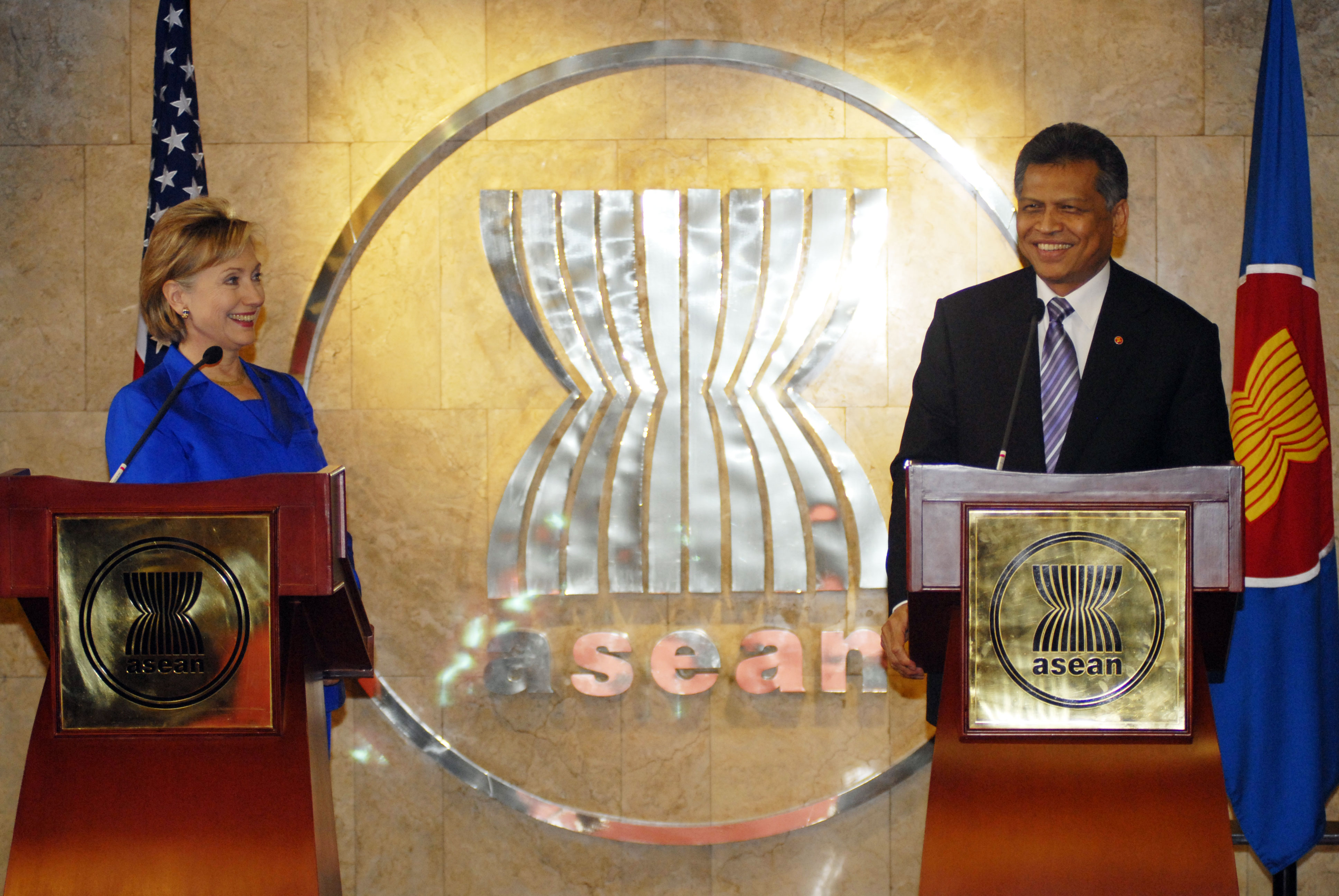
Surin at a press conference with Hillary Clinton in Jakarta, Indonesia

On 18 June 2007, the Thai cabinet unanimously endorsed the recommendation of the Thai Foreign Ministry that Surin Pitsuwan be nominated as the Thai candidate for Secretary-General of ASEAN. He was confirmed by the ASEAN Foreign Ministers during their 40th annual meeting in Manila in July 2007 and succeeded Ong Keng Yong from Singapore on 1 January 2008. His term of office was five years. The Economist magazine, commenting that most secretaries-general are "usually a senior regional official rewarded with the post as the crowning boondoggle in a career of not rocking the boat", states that Surin is different in that he seeks an activist role in member states. Surin Pitsuwan was the first ASEAN Secretary-General with significant political experience.

On 1 January 2013, he handed over his post to Le Luong Minh, the next ASEAN Secretary-General. On 17 January he announced that he would be ready to take over Thailand's education ministry "if given the chance".

Surin's tenure at ASEAN saw the rise of the regional organization into an important global player in international affairs. "He will be a hard act to follow", said Professor Amitav Acharya of the American University in Washington D.C. Under Surin's stewardship, Acharya said, ASEAN moved away from the principle of "non-interference in the internal affairs" of member states that had been used by some to deflect criticisms of their human rights records, and the grouping succeeded in setting up its own Human Rights Commission. The change in direction followed Surin's advocacy of a policy of "flexible engagement" towards Myanmar when he was Foreign Minister from 1997 through 2000. The policy called for increasing interactions with Myanmar leaders when they took steps towards reform, and building people-to-people contacts between nations. Prior to that, ASEAN had been criticized by some for its policy of "constructive engagement", which detractors said was simply a cover for business persons to ignore government repression. Acharya said that Surin would be remembered for guiding the grouping through challenging times, including the opening up of Myanmar, the United States entry into the East Asia Summit, and rising tensions over the South China Sea. "He was the most active, open and globalized ASEAN secretary-general ever", he said. An editorial in the Jakarta Post lauded Surin as the most effective of the 12 secretaries-general in the group's history.

== Affiliations ==
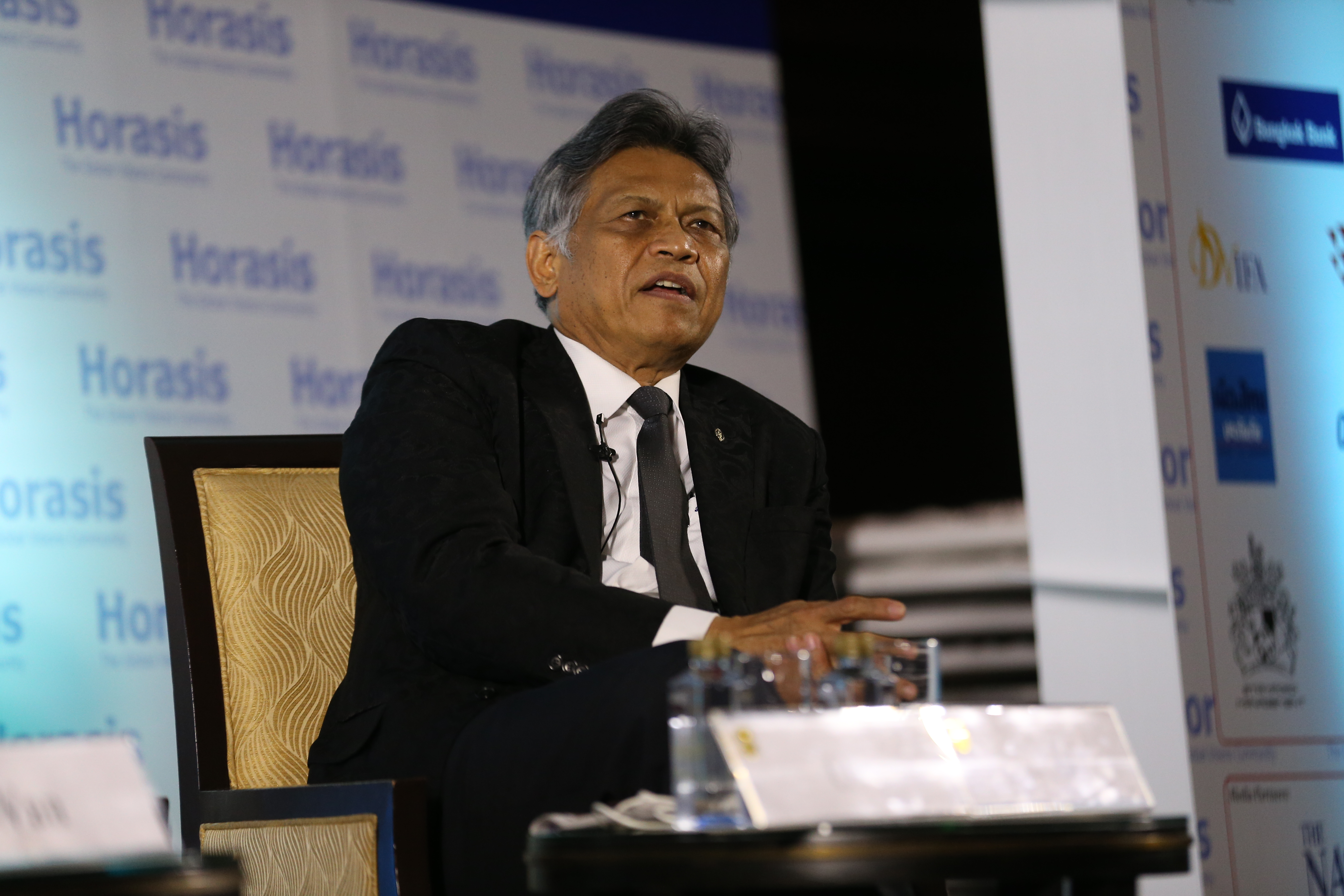
Surin at Horasis Asia Meeting 2016

Since 2003, he was a member of the board of trustees for The Asia Foundation.

Since October 2013, Surin served as on the board of the Centre for Humanitarian Dialogue (HD), a private diplomacy organization whose mission is to prevent armed violence through mediation and dialogue.

Surin was a member of the Commission on Human Security, a member of the advisory board of the International Commission on Intervention and State Sovereignty, and a member of the World Commission on the Social Dimension of Globalization.

Surin's eldest son, Fuadi Pitsuwan, announced the formation of the Surin Pitsuwan Foundation in 2019. The foundation will focus on three areas: education, diplomacy, and human security. The foundation will provide scholarships to ASEAN students to study abroad, within and without the region, to spur ASEAN integration and encourage academic excellence. The foundation will fund diplomacy programs in interfaith dialogue and conflict resolution to further ASEAN integration. On human security, the foundation will assist in disaster relief and respond to development needs that will help secure the future of ASEAN's citizens.

== Death ==
Surin died on 30 November 2017 of heart failure. He collapsed while preparing to address the Thailand Halal Assembly 2017 in Bangkok. He was 68.

== Honours ==
Surin has received the following royal decorations in the Honours System of Thailand:

- Knight Grand Cordon (Special Class) of The Most Noble Order of the Crown of Thailand
- Knight Grand Cordon (Special Class) of the Most Exalted Order of the White Elephant

=== Foreign honour ===
- Malaysia: Honorary Commander of the Order of Loyalty to the Crown of Malaysia (P.S.M.) (2015)
- Portugal: Grand Cross of the Order of Prince Henry
- Distinguished Fellow of JICA-RI

== Academic rank ==
- Professor Emeritus of Thammasat University

Political offices
Preceded by Ong Keng Yong	Secretary-General of ASEAN; 2008–2012	Succeeded by Lê Lương Minh
