= Lê Lương Minh =

Vietnamese politician and diplomat

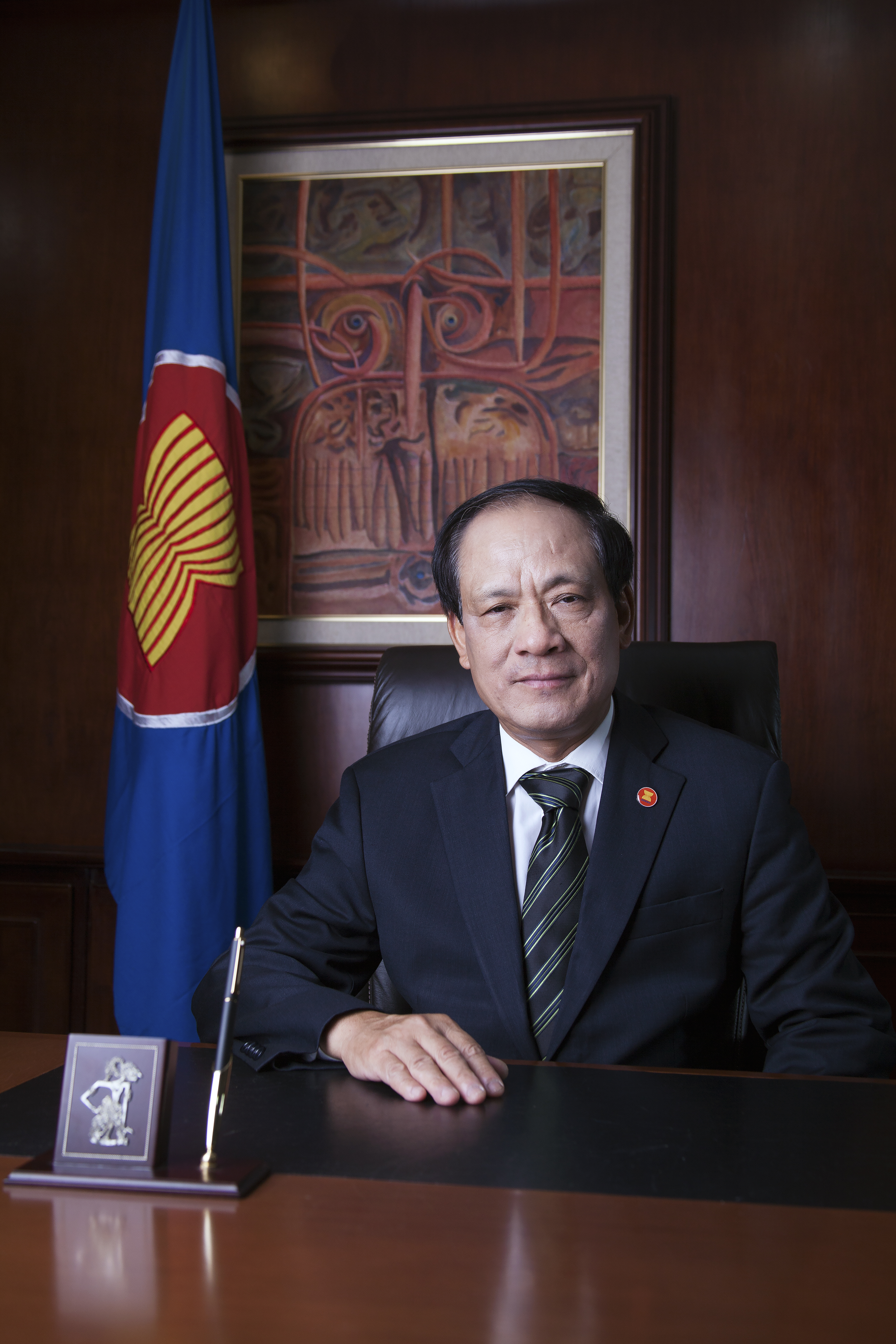
- Official portrait, 2014

13th Secretary-General of ASEAN
- In office 1 January 2013 – 31 December 2017
- Preceded by: Surin Pitsuwan
- Succeeded by: Lim Jock Hoi

Permanent Representative of Vietnam to the United Nations
- In office January 2004 – June 2011
- Preceded by: Nguyễn Thành Châu
- Succeeded by: Lê Hoài Trung

Non-resident Deputy Minister of Foreign Affairs of Vietnam
- In office December 2008 – 1 February 2018

Personal details
- Born: 1 September 1952 (age 74) Thanh Hóa, Vietnam
- Party: Communist Party of Vietnam
- Education: Diplomatic Academy of Vietnam; Jawaharlal Nehru University
- Lê Lương Minh's voice Lê Lương Minh on the establishment of the ASEAN Economic Community; Recorded 1 Apr 2015

Lê Lương Minh (born 1 September 1952) is a Vietnamese politician and diplomat who served as the 13th secretary-general of ASEAN between 2013 and 2017.

== Early life ==
Lê Lương Minh graduated from the Diplomatic Academy of Vietnam in Hanoi, Vietnam in 1974, and the Jawaharlal Nehru University in New Delhi, India.

== Political career ==
In 1975, he began his career in Vietnam's Ministry of Foreign Affairs. He was appointed Deputy Director-General for International Organisations in 1993. In 1995, he was appointed as Ambassador – Permanent Representative to the United Nations Office and Other International Organisations in Geneva. In 1997, he was appointed as Ambassador – Deputy Permanent Representative to the United Nations at Headquarters. Since February 17, 2004, he has been Vietnam's ambassador to the United Nations in New York City. He held this office from 1995 to 1997 for the UN institutions in Geneva and as a deputy in New York City from 1997 to 1999. He was the President of the United Nations Security Council in July 2008 and October 2009. He was nominated ASEAN Secretary-General by the government of Vietnam, a post which he took over on January 1, 2013. The ASEAN leaders endorsed him as ASEAN Secretary-General for 2013–2017 in a ceremony at the bloc's headquarter in Jakarta on January 7, 2013.

== Personal life ==
He is a native of Thanh Hóa, a coastal town 150 kilometers south of Vietnam's capital Hanoi. He is married and has two daughters.

Political offices
Preceded by Surin Pitsuwan	Secretary General of ASEAN; 2013–2017	Succeeded by Lim Jock Hoi
