= Nguyễn Cơ Thạch =

Vietnamese foreign minister 1980-1991

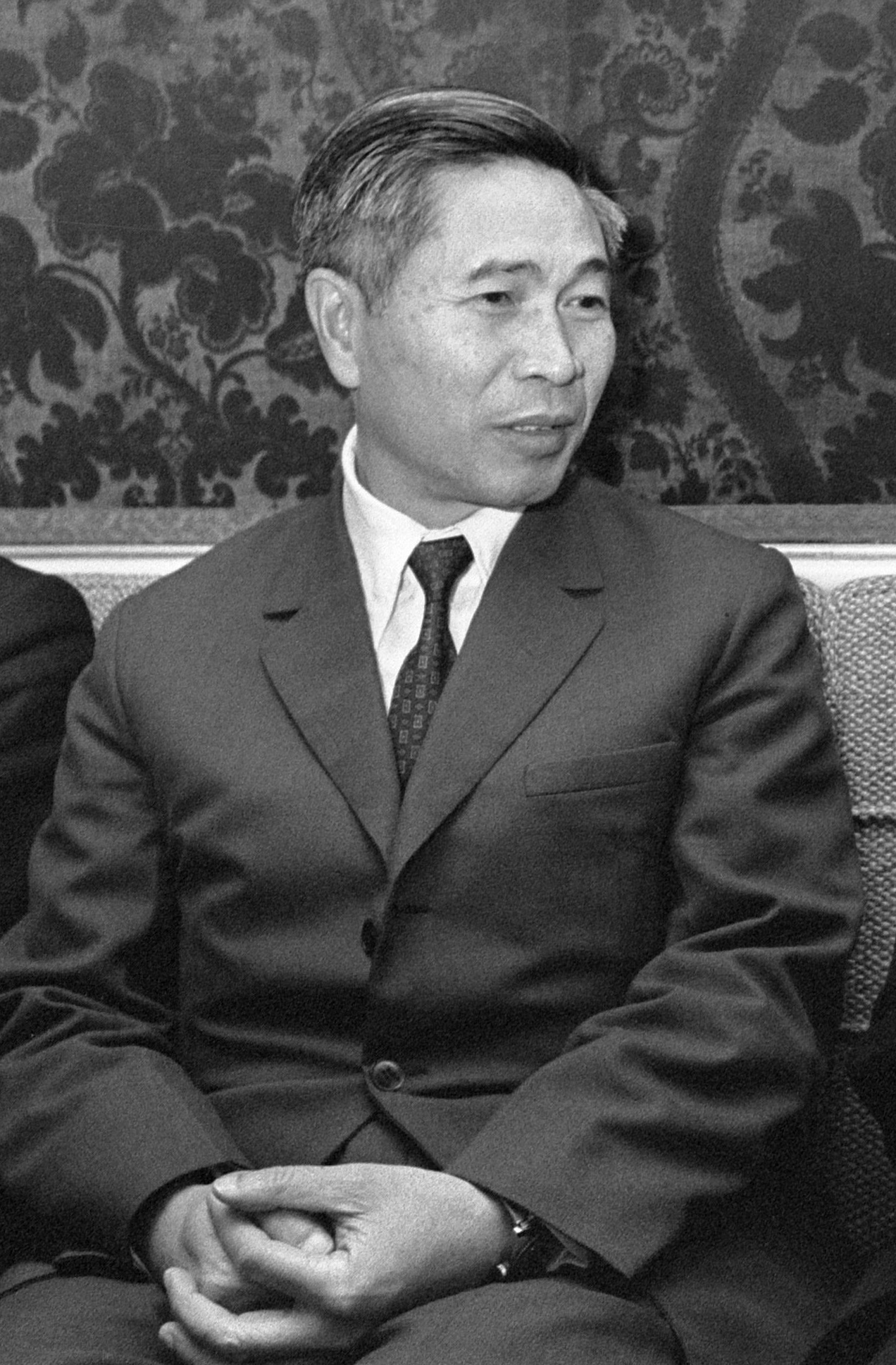

Deputy Prime Minister of Vietnam
- In office 16 February 1987 – 10 September 1991
- Prime Minister: Phạm Văn Đồng; Phạm Hùng; Đỗ Mười
- Preceded by: Nguyễn Duy Trinh
- Succeeded by: Nguyễn Mạnh Cầm

Minister of Foreign Affairs
- In office 7 February 1980 – 9 August 1991
- Prime Minister: Phạm Văn Đồng; Phạm Hùng; Võ Văn Kiệt; Đỗ Mười
- Preceded by: Nguyễn Duy Trinh
- Succeeded by: Nguyễn Mạnh Cầm

Secretary of State for Foreign Affairs
- In office 24 May 1979 – 7 February 1980
- Minister: Nguyễn Duy Trinh
- Preceded by: Position established
- Succeeded by: Position abolished

Personal details
- Born: 15 May 1921 Nam Định Province
- Died: 10 April 1998 (aged 76) Hanoi, Vietnam
- Party: Communist Party
- Children: Phạm Bình Minh

Nguyễn Cơ Thạch (15 May 1921 – 10 April 1998; born Phạm Văn Cương) was a Vietnamese revolutionary, diplomat, and politician.

== Biography ==
He was Foreign Minister of Vietnam from February 1980 to July 1991. Thạch was seen as pragmatic and influential (given his representation in the Politburo). His time in office coincided with part of Vietnam's transition from an ideology-based alignment to the Soviet bloc towards a pragmatic approach to foreign policy, including the primacy of economic over ideological considerations, integration into ASEAN and closer relations with non-socialist countries. However, Mr Thạch's efforts to normalize relations with the United States were not successful.

His son Phạm Bình Minh had occupied the same positions held by Thạch, serving as Deputy Prime Minister of Vietnam (2013–2023) and Minister of Foreign Affairs of Vietnam (2011–2021).

Preceded by Nguyễn Duy Trinh	Foreign Minister of Vietnam; 1980–1991	Succeeded by Nguyễn Mạnh Cầm
