= Diplomatic Academy of Vietnam =

Public university and government think tank in Hanoi

- Học viện Ngoại giao (Vietnamese)
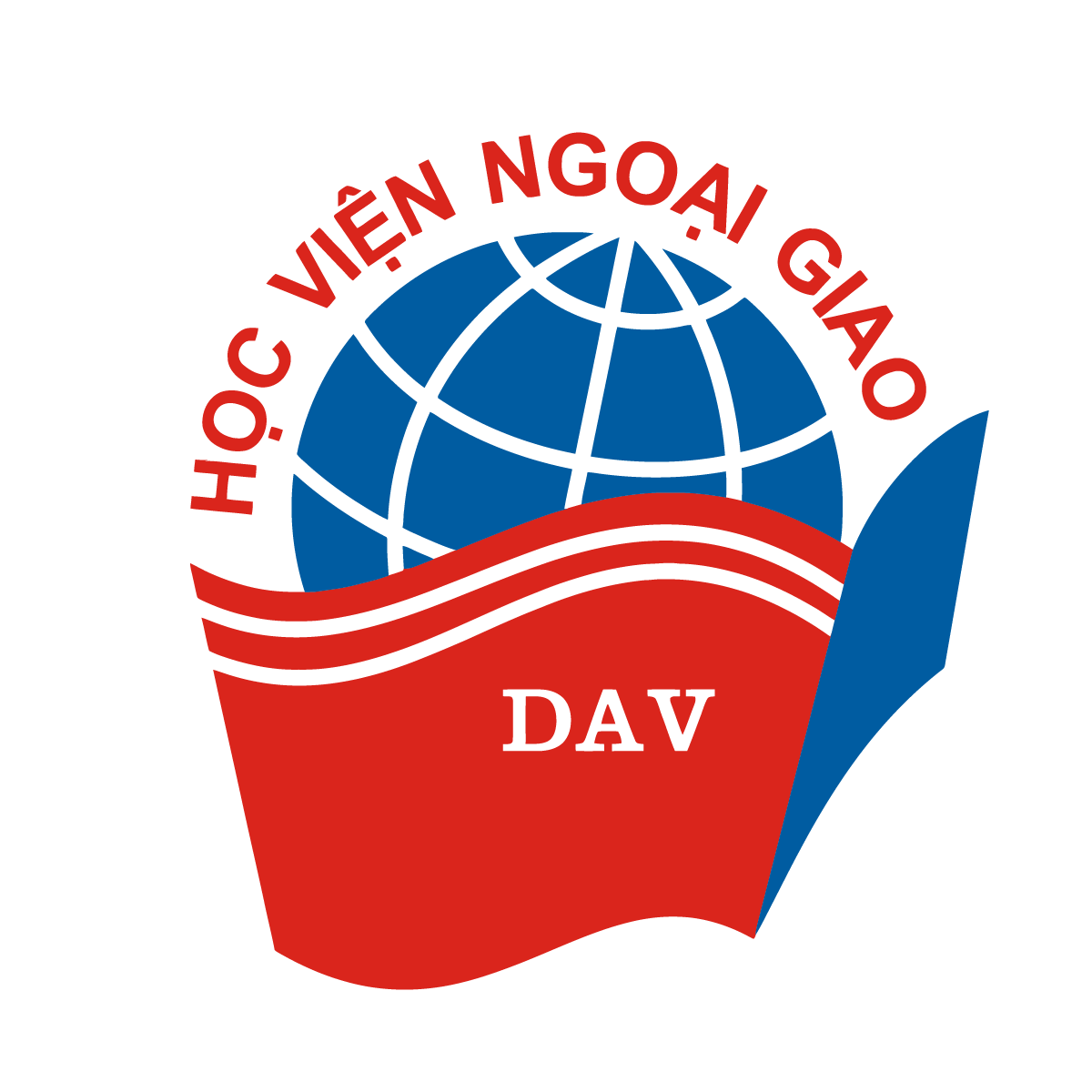
- Other names: DAV; Académie diplomatique du Viêt Nam
- Former names: School of Diplomacy (1959-1960); Faculty of International Relations, University of Economics and Finance (1960-1963); School of Diplomatic and Foreign Trade Cadres (1963-1967); University of Diplomacy (1967-198); Institute of International Relations (1977-1992); Academy of International Relations (1992-2008)
- Motto: “Vị thế quốc gia – Tầm vóc quốc tế”
- Motto in English: National Prestige – Global Stature
- Type: Public university and policy academy Government-affiliated think tank Public non-business unit of department-general rank (đơn vị sự nghiệp công lập tương đương cấp Tổng cục)
- Established: 17 June 1959; 67 years ago (Note: Sources differ on the institution's date of origin. The Diplomatic Academy of Vietnam traces its own lineage to the Trường Ngoại giao founded on 17 June 1959. The Vietnam University Rankings project instead records 1967, the year the Trường Đại học Ngoại giao (University of Diplomacy) was re-established as a stand-alone institution after splitting from the foreign-trade cadre school with which it had briefly merged.)
- Founder: Ministry of Foreign Affairs of Vietnam
- Parent institution: Ministry of Foreign Affairs of Vietnam
- Affiliations: ASEAN Institutes of Strategic and International Studies (ASEAN-ISIS); Council for Security Cooperation in the Asia Pacific (CSCAP); Network of East Asian Think-tanks (NEAT); Asian Political and International Studies Association (APISA); APEC Study Centers Consortium (ASCC)
- Director (Giám đốc): Nguyễn Hùng Sơn
- Academic staff: c. 300 (2024)
- Students: 5,932 (2023-24 academic year)
- Postgraduates: 322
- Location: Hanoi, Vietnam; 21.023°N 105.806°E
- Campus: Urban, single campus
- Language: Vietnamese and English (principal languages of instruction); French and Chinese (additional languages of instruction)
- Journal: Tạp chí Nghiên cứu Quốc tế (International Studies Review)
- Colours: Blue
- Website: dav.edu.vn

Diplomatic Academy of Vietnam (DAV; Vietnamese: Học viện Ngoại giao) is a public research university and state think tank in Láng, Hanoi, Vietnam, operating under the direct authority of the Ministry of Foreign Affairs. The university was established in 1957 during the Vietnam War by the Standing Committee of the Government Council of the Democratic Republic of Vietnam. Acting on the urgent geopolitical needs of the Cold War, the institution was established as the nation's vanguard training ground for revolutionary cadres following authorization by Prime Minister Phạm Văn Đồng.

It is the only institution in Vietnam dedicated specifically to training diplomats, and it combines this teaching role with a mandate, unusual among Vietnamese universities, to produce strategic research and policy advice for the Ministry of Foreign Affairs, the leadership of the Communist Party of Vietnam and the Government of Vietnam on international relations, foreign policy and, since 2012, the South China Sea.

Founded on 17 June 1959 as the School of Diplomacy, the institution has been reorganised and renamed several times, passing through incarnations as a faculty of a merged economics-and-trade university, an independent diplomatic and foreign-trade cadre school, the Institute of International Relations and the Academy of International Relations before being upgraded to its present name and status by prime minister Nguyễn Tấn Dũng in 2008.

DAV occupies a single campus in Hanoi's densely populated Láng neighborhood and enrolls close to 6,000 students across bachelor's, master's, doctoral and joint international degree programs, with the academy itself reporting more than 7,000 people enrolled if short-course and continuing-education participants are included.

Because of its dual teaching-and-research mandate, DAV is regularly counted, alongside a small number of other Vietnamese institutes, among the country's internationally recognised policy think tanks, having been ranked 40th among the top think tanks of Southeast Asia and the Pacific, and 40th among the world's best government-affiliated think tanks, in the Global Go To Think Tank Index compiled by the University of Pennsylvania's Think Tanks and Civil Societies Program. Many of Vietnam's most senior diplomats, including successive foreign ministers, are alumni of the academy.

== History ==
=== Founding and early reorganisations, 1959-1967 ===
In the years after the 1954 Geneva Accords divided Vietnam, the socialist government in Hanoi sought to build a professional corps of diplomats and foreign-trade officials for the newly reconstituted state.

A first short course for diplomatic cadres was overseen by Deputy Foreign Minister Ung Văn Khiêm, with Đinh Nho Liêm as his deputy, before the effort was placed on a permanent institutional footing. On 17 June 1959 the Standing Committee of the Government Council issued a decision establishing the Trường Ngoại giao (School of Diplomacy) under the Ministry of Foreign Affairs.

After 1965, the university spent the height of the Vietnam War operating north of the capital in the village of Thù Lâm in Thái Nguyên, primarily out of disguised bamboo classrooms. adapting its governance to survive intense aerial bombardments.

The young school's independence was short-lived: on 28 July 1960 it was merged into the University of Economics and Finance (today the National Economics University) as a Faculty of International Relations, comprising a diplomacy department and a foreign-trade department, even though the faculty continued to be staffed and directed by the Ministry of Foreign Affairs.

In January 1963 the faculty was again separated out, this time to re-form the Trường Cán bộ Ngoại giao - Ngoại thương (School of Diplomatic and Foreign Trade Cadres), directly under the Ministry of Foreign Affairs.

After 1965, the university spent the height of the Vietnam War operating north of the capital in the village of Thù Lâm in Thái Nguyên, primarily out of disguised bamboo classrooms, adapting its governance to survive intense aerial bombardments.

The combined school was in turn split in 1967 into two independent institutions, the Trường Đại học Ngoại giao (University of Diplomacy) and the Trường Đại học Ngoại thương (University of Foreign Trade), the latter evolving into today's Foreign Trade University.

From the mid-1960s to the signing of the Paris Peace Accords, senior revolutionary diplomats served as the university's chief operational leaders. Following the end of the war in 1975, the institution returned fully to its original urban campus, appointing administrators who focused exclusively on global integration rather than strictly wartime political mobilization.

Around this time, the university was run in succession by Võ Anh Tuấn and Trần Hồng Hải, both serving as deputy rector with delegated authority to head the school, before Lê Tân (born Trần Hữu Cừ) was appointed rector in 1971, a post he held until 1980.

=== Institute of International Relations, 1977-1992 ===
On 11 March 1977 the Government Council issued Decision No. 60/CP establishing the Viện Quan hệ Quốc tế (Institute of International Relations), a separate research-oriented body. A decade later, on 19 May 1987, the Council of Ministers issued Decree No. 78-HĐBT merging the University of Diplomacy into the Institute of International Relations, creating a single Ministry of Foreign Affairs body that combined teaching and strategic research under one roof. Võ Đông Giang and then Phạm Bình headed the merged institute during this period.

=== Academy of International Relations, 1992-2008 ===
On 1 August 1992 the Chairman of the Council of Ministers issued Decision No. 279-CT renaming the body the Học viện Quan hệ Quốc tế (Academy of International Relations). The Academy remained under the direct management of the Ministry of Foreign Affairs for its overall direction, while following the Ministry of Education and Training's regulations for degree-granting institutions. Directors of the Academy during this period included Đào Huy Ngọc, Vũ Dương Huân and Trịnh Quang Thanh, with Nguyễn Quang Chiến serving as acting director at one point; Dương Văn Quảng became director in the 2000s and would go on to lead the institution through its 2008 transformation.

=== Diplomatic Academy of Vietnam, 2008-present ===
Responding to the country's deepening international integration after its 2007 accession to the World Trade Organization, the Prime Minister issued Decision No. 82/2008/QĐ-TTg on 23 June 2008, upgrading the Academy of International Relations and renaming it the Học viện Ngoại giao - the Diplomatic Academy of Vietnam - with the organisational rank of a department-general (cấp Tổng cục), a status that gave it greater administrative and budgetary autonomy than an ordinary Ministry department. On 15 June 2009 the Prime Minister issued Decision No. 821/QĐ-TTg authorising DAV to award doctoral degrees, in international relations and international law.

The Academy's research role was formalised and expanded over the following years. Decision No. 82/2008/QĐ-TTg had already provided for a strategic-studies institute, which opened as the Institute for Diplomatic Strategy Studies in 2008; a second research institute, the Institute of East Sea, was created under Decision No. 29/2012/QĐ-TTg of 12 July 2012 to study the South China Sea disputes. A dedicated undergraduate and postgraduate Training Department was established by Decision No. 75/2014/QĐ-TTg of 24 December 2014, and the Academy's functions and structure were restated by Decision No. 07/2019/QĐ-TTg of 15 February 2019.

Under directors Đặng Đình Quý (who left in January 2016 to become a Deputy Foreign Minister) and Nguyễn Vũ Tùng, and acting director Phạm Lan Dung from 2020, the Academy expanded its international partnerships and joint degree programmes and, from 2020 to 2021, carried out a roughly VND 200 billion (about US$8 million) modernisation of its Hanoi campus.

A comprehensive reorganisation followed Decision No. 08/2024/QĐ-TTg, signed by Deputy Prime Minister Trần Lưu Quang on 28 June 2024 and effective from 15 August 2024, which restructured the Academy into eleven constituent units and, for the first time, formally established an Academy Council (Hội đồng Học viện) as its governance body.

DAV marked its 65th anniversary in December 2024 with a ceremony attended by Deputy Prime Minister and Foreign Minister Bùi Thanh Sơn, at which the Academy also opened a "Traditions Room" documenting its institutional history. Nguyễn Hùng Sơn, previously a deputy director and head of the Institute of East Sea, was named acting director on 29 November 2024 and confirmed as director on 29 May 2025, with Deputy Prime Minister Bùi Thanh Sơn describing the Academy as being in a period of "strong movement toward autonomy" in its teaching and finances.

== Campus ==
DAV occupies a single campus at 69 Chùa Láng street, in what is now Láng ward (formerly Láng Thượng ward of Đống Đa district), Hanoi, where it has been based since the institution's modern re-establishment. Unlike Vietnam's larger comprehensive universities, DAV has no satellite campuses; the Academy has stated that it has no branch or teaching site in Ho Chi Minh City or elsewhere.

Between 2020 and 2021 the Academy carried out a campus modernisation programme costing approximately VND 200 billion, financed as part of a broader push to upgrade facilities across the institution. The centrepiece of the project was a new multi-purpose teaching building of 2,040 square metres, comprising seven storeys above ground and one basement level and divided into teaching, office and conference zones; the Academy's five-storey library building was refurbished at the same time so that its exterior would match the new building's architecture. The renovation also added conference and seminar rooms, expanded physical-education facilities, refurbished student housing, and created dedicated multimedia rooms and classrooms for the Academy's high-quality and internationally linked degree programmes.

== Organisation ==
=== Governance ===
DAV is a public non-business unit (đơn vị sự nghiệp công lập) under the Ministry of Foreign Affairs, with its own legal status, its own bank accounts, and the right to use a seal bearing the national emblem.

Since the 2024 reorganisation, the Academy has been formally governed by an Academy Council (Hội đồng Học viện), which acts as the Ministry of Foreign Affairs' representative body inside the institution; the Council and its chair are recognised by the Minister of Foreign Affairs and are accountable to the Minister. Day-to-day management is exercised by a Directorate (Ban Giám đốc) consisting of a director and up to three deputy directors, all appointed and dismissed by the Minister. As of 2025 the Directorate comprised Director Nguyễn Hùng Sơn and Deputy Directors Nguyễn Thị Thìn, Nguyễn Thị Lan Anh and Nguyễn Mạnh Đông. Phạm Lan Dung, who had served as acting director from 2020, was subsequently named standing vice-chair of the Academy Council; she was separately elected president of the Asian Society of International Law for 2023-2025, becoming the first Vietnamese scholar to hold that post.

Under the 2024 decision, the Academy's eleven constituent units are: the Institute for Diplomatic Strategy Studies; the Institute of East Sea; the Undergraduate and Graduate Training Department; the Foreign Affairs Cadres Training and Retraining Centre (known by its English acronym FOSET); the Department of Science, Information and the International Studies Review; the Office; the Faculty of International Politics and Diplomacy; the Faculty of International Law; the Faculty of International Economics; the Faculty of Communication and Cultural Diplomacy; and the Faculty of Foreign Languages, the last of which was created by merging the Academy's formerly separate English, French and Chinese language faculties. The reorganisation reduced the Academy's previous fifteen-unit structure, folding a Political Theory faculty into the politics and diplomacy faculty and merging the former Information and Documentation Centre with the Office of Scientific Management, partly to comply with press-management regulations governing the International Studies Review.

=== Staff and finances ===
As of the Academy's 65th anniversary in 2024, DAV employed more than 300 officials and staff, of whom around twenty held the rank of professor or associate professor and roughly 60 per cent held a master's or doctoral degree. An internal accounting from 2019 put the total workforce at 213, including 3 full professors, 14 associate professors, 39 holders of doctorates and 86 holders of master's degrees. As a state-funded public institution, DAV draws its core budget through the Ministry of Foreign Affairs; in 2025 Deputy Prime Minister and Foreign Minister Bùi Thanh Sơn described the Academy as being in the midst of a "strong transition toward autonomy", aimed at giving it more independent control over its academic offerings and finances as it professionalises and modernises. Over its history the Academy has received a number of state honours, including the First-Class Labour Order (1994), the Third-Class Independence Order (1999), the Second-Class Independence Order (2004), the Ho Chi Minh Order (2009) and the First-Class Independence Order (2019), as well as Laos' First-Class Labour Order in 2009.

== Education ==
=== Undergraduate level ===
DAV's undergraduate teaching is organised through its constituent faculties rather than a single college structure. In the 2023-24 academic year the Academy offered eight bachelor's degree programmes, of which five had received national quality accreditation. The main fields of study are International Relations, International Law, International Economics, International Business, International Communication, English Language, and Chinese Studies (offered within a broader Asia-Pacific studies orientation that has historically also encompassed American, Japanese and Korean studies). In May 2026 the Academy announced that all eight of its undergraduate programmes had received accreditation from the Foundation for International Business Administration Accreditation (FIBAA), which it presented as confirmation of the alignment of its teaching with international quality standards.

Admission is highly selective and is conducted mainly through Vietnam's national high-school graduation examination, supplemented by academic-record and international-certificate pathways; the Academy also requires, for its combined pathways, a minimum IELTS score in the range of 6.0 to 6.5, or higher for its high-quality tracks. Cut-off scores are consistently among the highest of any Vietnamese university: in 2024 the Academy's Chinese Studies programme required 29.2 out of 30 points under the literature-history-geography examination combination, the highest cut-off of any DAV programme that year, though the threshold eased somewhat in 2025.

=== Graduate level ===
DAV offers master's programmes in International Relations, International Law and International Economics, together with a Francophone-language joint master's track in International Relations, and doctoral programmes in International Relations and International Law, a status granted by the Prime Minister in 2009. In the 2023-24 academic year the Academy ran three master's programmes and two doctoral programmes. Its doctoral school has enrolled several hundred candidates over its history, and roughly 350 PhD candidates were active as of the mid-2020s according to Academy figures.

=== International and joint-degree programmes ===
DAV has built a network of joint and pathway undergraduate programmes with overseas universities under which students complete part of their degree in Hanoi and part abroad, receiving a degree from the partner institution. Its longest-running partner in this format is Victoria University of Wellington in New Zealand, which since 2009 has offered joint bachelor's tracks in International Relations, Political Science and Communication; students typically spend a year and a half at DAV before transferring to Wellington to complete the degree, which is awarded by Victoria University of Wellington and recognised worldwide. DAV also runs a joint bachelor's programme in International Business with Monash University in Australia, under which students complete one year at DAV and two years at Monash, receiving a Monash degree identical to that awarded to students who study there full-time, together with related joint programmes in communication and business fields with Macquarie University and Flinders University, also in Australia. The Academy has also cooperated with Jean Moulin Lyon III University in France on joint bachelor's and master's programmes in International Relations.

== Research ==
=== Research institutes ===
DAV's research mandate is carried out principally through two subordinate institutes. The Institute for Diplomatic Strategy Studies (Viện Nghiên cứu Chiến lược Ngoại giao), created in 2008, conducts analysis and forecasting on world affairs, international relations, and the political, security, economic, legal and cultural dimensions of Vietnamese foreign policy, and advises the Minister of Foreign Affairs and the Party and state leadership on the formulation of policy. The Institute of East Sea (Viện Biển Đông), established in 2012 under Decision No. 29/2012/QĐ-TTg, specialises in research on the South China Sea disputes and related questions of sovereignty, sovereign rights and jurisdiction under Vietnamese and international law. DAV additionally coordinates the Ministry of Foreign Affairs' wider scientific-research agenda, overseeing more than 250 research projects; since 2008 the Academy has led or contributed to three state-level, 82 ministerial-level and 26 institutional-level research topics, and its staff have contributed to the drafting of major Party documents including the political reports to the 11th, 12th and 13th National Party Congresses.

=== International cooperation ===
DAV maintains cooperative relationships with more than 80 partner universities, research institutes and organisations abroad and has signed over 100 memoranda of understanding with foreign counterparts. The Academy is a member of the ASEAN Institutes of Strategic and International Studies (ASEAN-ISIS), the Council for Security Cooperation in the Asia Pacific (CSCAP), the ASEAN Regional Forum's Experts and Eminent Persons group, the Asian Political and International Studies Association (APISA), the Network of East Asian Think-tanks (NEAT), the Network of ASEAN-China Think-tanks (NACT), the APEC Study Centers Consortium, the Greater Mekong Subregion academic research network known as GCMS, and the international network of Senghor chairs of Francophonie (RICSF); it also serves as Vietnam's coordinator for a regional network on conflict research in Southeast Asia. It maintains regular bilateral dialogue mechanisms with, among others, the China Institutes of Contemporary International Relations, the China Institute of International Studies, the Japan Institute of International Affairs, the Lao Institute of Foreign Affairs, the diplomatic academies of Australia and South Korea, and India's Institute for Defence Studies and Analyses. DAV is also an active participant in the content-preparation committees for major international conferences hosted by Vietnam, including summits of La Francophonie, APEC, ASEAN and the Asia–Europe Meeting, as well as the 132nd Assembly of the Inter-Parliamentary Union, held in Hanoi in 2015.

== Library and publishing ==
The Academy's library, part of its Department of Science, Information and the International Studies Review, holds more than 51,000 books and reference materials in support of teaching and research across the Academy and the wider Ministry of Foreign Affairs. Its holdings include specialised scholarly works and course texts on Vietnamese diplomatic history, American and Chinese studies, ASEAN affairs and international law, many of them written by DAV's own faculty.

Since 1993 the department has published the Tạp chí Nghiên cứu Quốc tế (International Studies Review), one of Vietnam's leading academic journals on international relations and foreign policy, which appears in a Vietnamese-language edition every three months and an English-language edition twice yearly; an online edition was launched in 2018 to mark the journal's 25th anniversary. The journal covers Vietnamese foreign policy, the foreign policies of major powers, great-power relations, international economics, international law and international relations theory. The Academy marked the journal's 30th anniversary jointly with the 15th anniversaries of the Institute for Diplomatic Strategy Studies, FOSET and the Information and Documentation Centre at a ceremony in December 2023 attended by Foreign Minister Bùi Thanh Sơn.

== Reputation and rankings ==
In Vietnam's domestically produced VNUR University Rankings, DAV has ranked among the leading institutions nationally on the "learner quality" criterion in recent years, placing second in 2024 and third in 2025 out of the roughly one hundred universities assessed, while ranking more modestly on criteria measuring research output and scale.

As a policy institute, DAV is more frequently benchmarked against think tanks than against universities. In the 2017 Global Go To Think Tank Index Report, produced by the Think Tanks and Civil Societies Program at the University of Pennsylvania, DAV was ranked 40th among the "Top Think Tanks in Southeast Asia and the Pacific" and 40th among the world's "Best Government Affiliated Think Tanks", one of only five Vietnamese institutions to appear in the regional list that year, alongside Vietnam's Institute of World Economics and Politics, which ranked higher, at 30th and 24th respectively in the two categories. DAV's appearance in subsequent editions of the index, including Bruegel's 2019 compilation of "Best Government Affiliated Think Tanks", has continued to be cited by Vietnamese commentators as evidence that the Academy is one of a small number of Vietnamese research institutions with international recognition. (Note: The original English-language Wikipedia article on the Diplomatic Academy of Vietnam cites: "2019 Best Government Affiliated Think Tanks" (PDF), Bruegel.org, retrieved 9 April 2021.)

Admission to DAV is considered among the most competitive of any Vietnamese university, with entrance cut-off scores regularly at or near the top of national rankings and annual undergraduate intake in the low thousands. Its graduates are heavily represented in Vietnam's diplomatic corps and in the senior ranks of the Ministry of Foreign Affairs.

== Notable people ==
=== Alumni ===
==== Politics and diplomacy ====
Several of Vietnam's most senior foreign-policy officials of the past two decades are DAV alumni. Phạm Bình Minh, who studied at the Academy, went on to serve as Foreign Minister from 2011 to 2021 and as permanent Deputy Prime Minister from 2013 to 2023. Bùi Thanh Sơn, a DAV alumnus, served as Foreign Minister from 2021 and as Deputy Prime Minister from 2024. Lê Hoài Trung, previously head of the Communist Party's Central External Relations Commission, became Foreign Minister in 2025. Lê Lương Minh, a DAV graduate, served as Secretary-General of ASEAN from 2013 to 2017. Lê Hải Bình, a DAV alumnus, served as Ministry of Foreign Affairs spokesperson from 2014 to 2017 before later becoming editor-in-chief of the Communist Review and, from 2025, Standing Deputy Minister of Culture, Sports and Tourism.

==== Diplomacy ====
Đặng Đình Quý, who graduated from the Academy in 1988, rose to become its director before serving as a Deputy Foreign Minister and Vietnam's Permanent Representative to the United Nations. Đỗ Hùng Việt, a Deputy Foreign Minister, became Vietnam's Permanent Representative to the United Nations Office at Geneva in 2025. Phạm Thanh Bình, a Deputy Foreign Minister, has served as Vietnam's Ambassador to China. Hà Kim Ngọc served as Vietnam's Ambassador to the United States. Lê Thị Tuyết Mai served as Ambassador and Permanent Representative of Vietnam to the United Nations Office at Geneva and to the World Trade Organization. Đặng Hoàng Giang, who holds a master's degree in international relations from DAV, was reappointed a Deputy Foreign Minister in 2026 after a diplomatic career that began at the Ministry in 2000.

==== Other fields ====
DAV graduates have also achieved prominence outside government service. Khánh Vy, a television host and social-media personality known for her command of several languages, graduated with distinction from the Academy. Nguyễn Thu Thủy, Miss Vietnam 1994, and Nguyễn Thảo Hương, Miss ASEAN 2005, both studied at the Academy, as did singers Uyên Linh, winner of Vietnam Idol in 2010, and Mỹ Mỹ. Television presenter Phạm Ngọc Huy, known for hosting the game shows Đường lên đỉnh Olympia and Đấu trường thông thái, is also a DAV alumnus, as are the television host and actress Thanh Vân Hugo and actress Mai Thu Huyền.

=== Notable staff ===
Dương Văn Quảng, a diplomat and scholar of French foreign policy, directed the institution across its 2008 transition from the Academy of International Relations to the Diplomatic Academy of Vietnam. Nguyễn Vũ Tùng, a professor of international relations, later served as director. Phạm Lan Dung, associate professor of international law, served as acting director from 2020 and was elected president of the Asian Society of International Law for 2023-2025. Vũ Dương Huân, a historian of Vietnamese diplomacy, directed the institution in its Academy of International Relations era. Nguyễn Thái Yên Hương, a professor specialising in American studies and United States-China relations, is the author of several of the Academy's standard reference textbooks on American foreign policy.

== Directors ==
Early leadership, School of Diplomacy and University of Diplomacy (1959–1980)

- 1959: Ung Văn Khiêm, Deputy Minister of Foreign Affairs, overseer of the first diplomatic-cadre training course (predecessor)
- 1959-1960s: Đinh Nho Liêm, deputy head of the first training course
- Hoàng Văn Lợi, rector, University of Diplomacy, and Deputy Minister of Foreign Affairs
- Phạm Ngọc Quế, head of the International Relations department, University of Economics and Finance; deputy head, School of Diplomatic and Foreign Trade Cadres
- 1960-1961: Dương Thiết Sơn, head, International Relations department, University of Economics and Finance
- 1961-1963: Nguyễn Đăng Hành, head, International Relations department; deputy head, School of Diplomatic and Foreign Trade Cadres
- 1964-1965: Nguyễn Quang Tạo, deputy head, School of Diplomatic and Foreign Trade Cadres
- 1968-1969: Võ Anh Tuấn, deputy head with delegated authority over the School of Diplomacy
- 1969-1971: Trần Hồng Hải, deputy head with delegated authority over the University of Diplomacy
- 1971-1980: Lê Tân (born Trần Hữu Cừ), rector, School and University of Diplomacy
- Nguyễn Duy Kinh, acting rector, University of Diplomacy

Institute of International Relations (1977–1992)

- 1987-1992: Võ Đông Giang
- Phạm Bình
- 1992: Nguyễn Tuấn Liêu, director, Institute of International Relations / Academy of International Relations

Academy of International Relations (1992–2008)

- Đào Huy Ngọc
- Vũ Dương Huân
- Trịnh Quang Thanh
- Nguyễn Quang Chiến (acting)
- Dương Văn Quảng, director spanning the Academy's 2008 upgrade to the Diplomatic Academy of Vietnam

Diplomatic Academy of Vietnam (2008–present)

- 2013(approx.)-2016: Đặng Đình Quý, later Deputy Minister of Foreign Affairs and Permanent Representative of Vietnam to the United Nations
- Nguyễn Vũ Tùng
- 2020-2024: Phạm Lan Dung (acting)
- 2024-2025: Nguyễn Hùng Sơn (acting)
- 2025-present: Nguyễn Hùng Sơn

== See also ==
- Ministry of Foreign Affairs (Vietnam)
- Foreign relations of Vietnam
- List of universities in Vietnam
