= Phạm Bình Minh =

Vietnamese politician

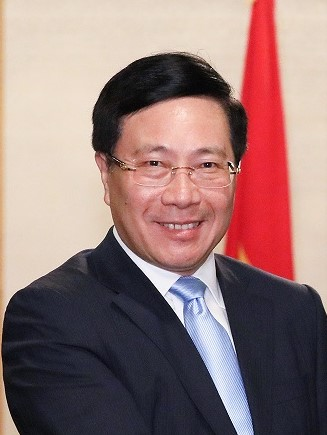
- Minh during a visit to Japan in 2019

Permanent Deputy Prime Minister
- In office 6 September 2021 – 5 January 2023
- Prime Minister: Phạm Minh Chính
- Preceded by: Trương Hòa Bình
- Succeeded by: Nguyễn Hòa Bình

Deputy Prime Minister
- In office 13 November 2013 – 6 September 2021 Serving with Vũ Đức Đam, Vương Đình Huệ, Trương Hòa Bình, Trịnh Đình Dũng
- Prime Minister: Nguyễn Tấn Dũng; Nguyễn Xuân Phúc; Phạm Minh Chính
- Preceded by: Phạm Gia Khiêm
- Succeeded by: Trần Lưu Quang (2023)

Minister of Foreign Affairs
- In office 3 August 2011 – 8 April 2021
- Prime Minister: Nguyễn Tấn Dũng; Nguyễn Xuân Phúc
- Preceded by: Phạm Gia Khiêm
- Succeeded by: Bùi Thanh Sơn

Deputy Minister of Foreign Affairs
- In office 29 August 2007 – 2 August 2011
- Preceded by: Lê Công Phụng
- Succeeded by: Nguyen Phuong Nga

Director General of the Department for International Organizations, Foreign Affairs
- In office March 2003 – September 2006

Deputy Chief of Mission at the Embassy of Vietnam in the United States
- In office 2001–2003

Deputy Permanent Representative of Vietnam to the United Nations
- In office 1999–2001

Member of the Politburo
- In office 27 January 2016 – 30 December 2022
- General Secretary: Nguyễn Phú Trọng

Personal details
- Born: 26 March 1959 (age 67) Liên Minh, Vụ Bản, Nam Định Province, North Vietnam (now Vietnam)
- Party: Communist Party of Vietnam (1981–present)
- Spouse: Nguyễn Nguyệt Nga (died 2025)
- Children: Phạm Bình Anh; Phạm Bình Nam
- Parent(s): Nguyễn Cơ Thạch (father); Phan Thị Phúc (mother)
- Education: Diplomatic Academy of Vietnam; Fletcher School of Law and Diplomacy
- Awards: Labor Order
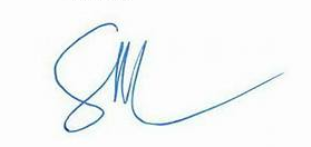
- Signature

Phạm Bình Minh (Vietnamese pronunciation: [faːm˧˨ʔ ʔɓïŋ˨˩ mïŋ˧˧]; born 26 March 1959) is a Vietnamese diplomat and politician who served as the Minister of Foreign Affairs from 2011 to 2021 and as Deputy Prime Minister of Vietnam from 2013 to 2023. Between September 2021 and his dismissal in January 2023, he also served as the Permanent Deputy Prime Minister, the most senior among the deputy prime ministers, in the Cabinet of Phạm Minh Chính. Minh was also a member of the Politburo of the Communist Party of Vietnam, the country's highest decision-making body, headed by General Secretary Nguyễn Phú Trọng.

Born in Nam Định Province, Minh was educated at the Diplomatic Academy of Vietnam and at Tufts University. He is the son of Nguyễn Cơ Thạch, who also served as vice premier and foreign minister of Vietnam.

On December 30, 2022, he was voted out of both the Central Committee and the Politburo of the Communist Party of Vietnam and stepped down from his position on January 5, 2023, after the National Assembly selected a successor. His dismissal was announced without specific reasons, but the moves come after he was accused of being involved in a scheme to extort fees from repatriate Vietnamese citizens stuck abroad during the COVID-19 pandemic with his ministerial assistant being arrested earlier in September 2022.

== Early life ==
Phạm Bình Minh graduated in 1981 from the University of Diplomacy (now the Diplomatic Academy of Viet Nam). He obtained a Master of Arts in Law and Diplomacy at Fletcher School, Tufts University, United States of America.

He is fluent in Vietnamese and English.

== Career ==
Minh began his diplomatic career in 1981 as a Desk Officer at the Department of Training in the Ministry of Foreign Affairs of Viet Nam. From 1982 to 1985, he held the position of an Attaché at the Embassy of Viet Nam to the United Kingdom. Before assuming the position of Deputy Director General of the Department for International Organizations from 1991 to 1999, he worked as a Desk Officer at the Department for General Affairs at the Ministry of Foreign Affairs from 1986 to 1990.

In the period of 1999 - January 2003, he served as Ambassador and Deputy Permanent Representative of Viet Nam to the United Nations in New York City, and Minister and Deputy Chief of Mission at the Embassy of Viet Nam to the United States of America. Back in Viet Nam in 2003, he worked for the Ministry of Foreign Affairs as Acting Director General and Director General of the Department for International Organizations, Head of Delegation for Dialogue on Human Rights with other countries.

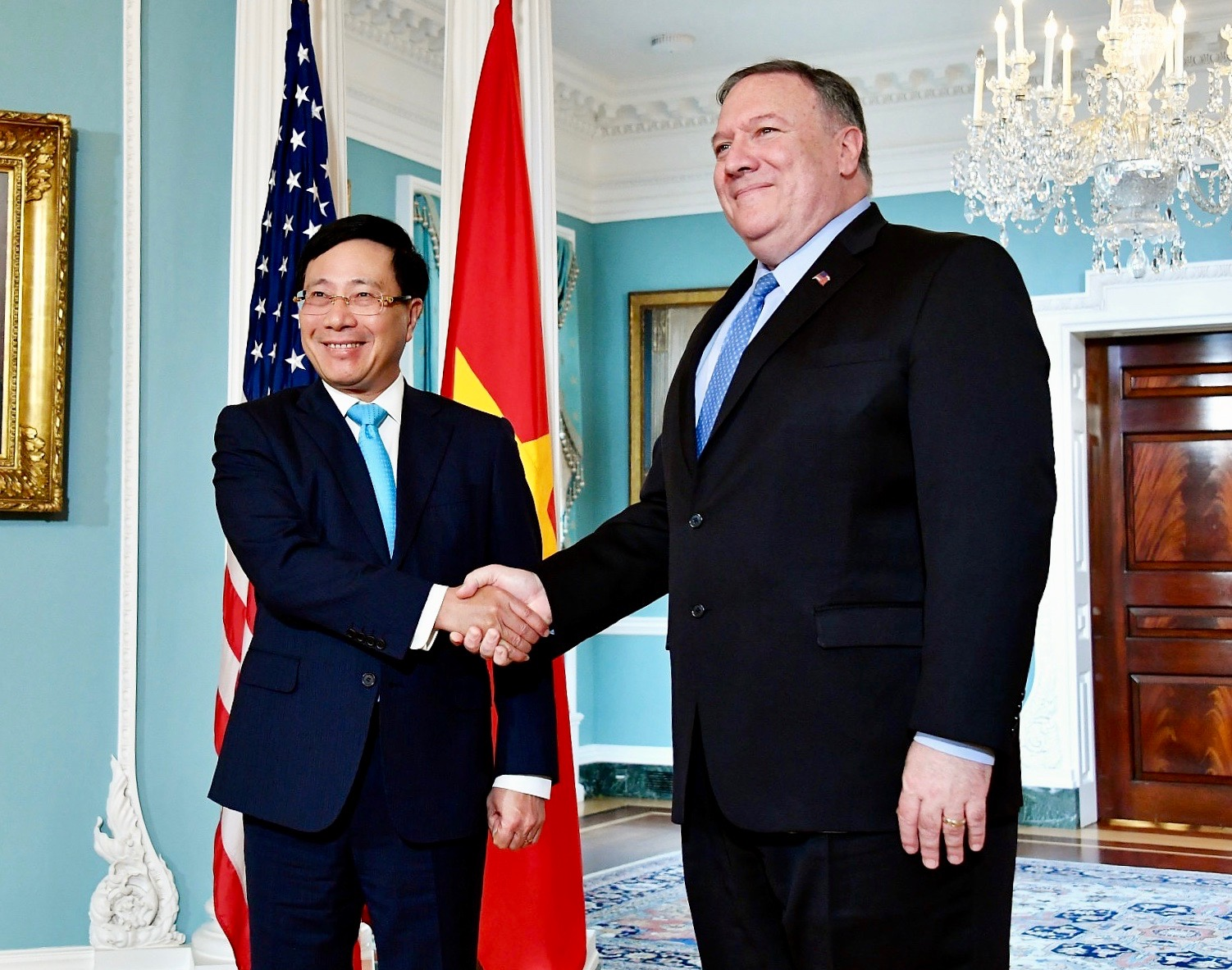
Minh meets with U.S. Secretary of State Michael R. Pompeo at the U.S. Department of State in Washington, D.C., on May 22, 2019.

He was elected as an alternate member of the 10th Central Committee of the Communist Party of Viet Nam in April 2006, and became a member of the 10th Central Committee of the Communist Party of Viet Nam in January 2009. Currently, he is a member of the 11th Central Committee of the Communist Party of Vietnam. He was elected as a member of the 13th National Assembly in November 2008.

He was appointed Assistant Minister of Foreign Affairs in September 2006 and Vice Minister of Foreign Affairs in November 2007, then Permanent Vice Minister of Foreign Affairs of Vietnam until August 2011. On 13 November 2013, he was designated as Deputy Prime Minister, Minister of Foreign Affairs of Viet Nam by the National Assembly of the Socialist Republic of Viet Nam. Prior to that time, he was appointed Minister of Foreign Affairs of Viet Nam on 3 August 2011 and since then has served as the 12th Minister of Foreign Affairs of Viet Nam.

On January, 5th, 2023, Vietnamese National Assembly has officially relieved his position of Deputy Prime Minister. The dismissal and retirement are said to be according to his wishes.

== Awards and honours ==
He has been conferred with many awards of high distinction, namely the Third-Class Labour Order in 2009 for excellent performance from 2002 to 2008; the National Emulation Fighter in 2010 for excellent performance in the national emulation campaign and contribution to the cause of socialist building and national defence; the Prime Minister’s Certificate of Merit in 2011 for excellent performance and contribution during Viet Nam’s Non-Permanent Membership of the United Nations Security Council, contributing to the cause of socialist building and national defence; the Prime Minister’s Certificate of Merit in 2006 for excellent performance from 2001 to 2006; and the Medal for the Diplomatic Cause in 2003 for valuable contribution to the development of Viet Nam’s diplomacy.

== See also ==
- List of foreign ministers in 2017
- List of current foreign ministers
