= Phạm Gia Khiêm =

Vietnamese politician (born 1944)

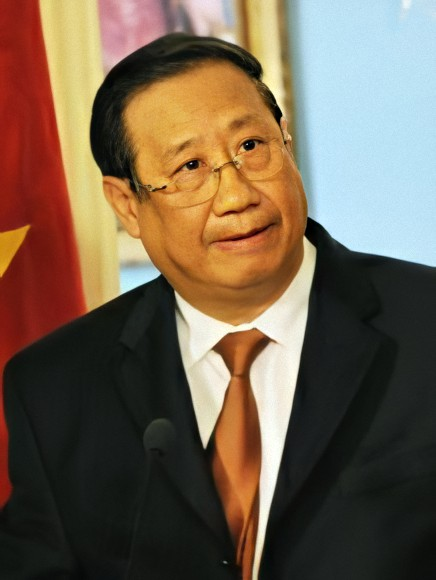

Minister of Science, Technology and Environment
- In office November 1996 – September 1997

Deputy Prime Minister of Vietnam
- In office September 29, 1997 – August 3, 2011
- Prime Minister: Phan Văn Khải; Nguyễn Tấn Dũng
- Succeeded by: Phạm Bình Minh

Minister of Foreign Affairs
- In office June 28, 2006 – August 3, 2011
- Prime Minister: Nguyễn Tấn Dũng
- Preceded by: Nguyễn Dy Niên
- Succeeded by: Phạm Bình Minh

Personal details
- Born: August 6, 1944 (age 81) Phú Thọ, French Indochina (now Vietnam)
- Party: Vietnam Communist Party

Phạm Gia Khiêm (born 6 August 1944) is a Vietnamese politician who was Deputy Prime Minister of Vietnam from 1997 to 2011 and former Minister of Foreign Affairs (2006-2011). He was previously Minister of Science, Technology and Environment from November 1996 to September 1997, and was born in Hanoi. He was a lecturer at Bắc Thái College of Electrical Engineering from 1968 to 1970, and gained a Ph.D. in Metallurgy in Czechoslovakia in 1975. He is fluent in English, Russian and Czech.

Khiêm made an official visit to the United States in March 2007, meeting with expatriate Vietnamese and visiting the Consulate General of Vietnam in San Francisco, California. During the visit he stated he would look into the case of imprisoned journalist Nguyễn Vũ Bình following a request from then United States Secretary of State Condoleezza Rice; Bình was pardoned and released on 8 June 2007.
