= Ministry of Foreign Affairs (Vietnam) =

Government ministry of Vietnam

Ministry of Foreign Affairs Socialist Republic of Vietnam
- Bộ Ngoại giao
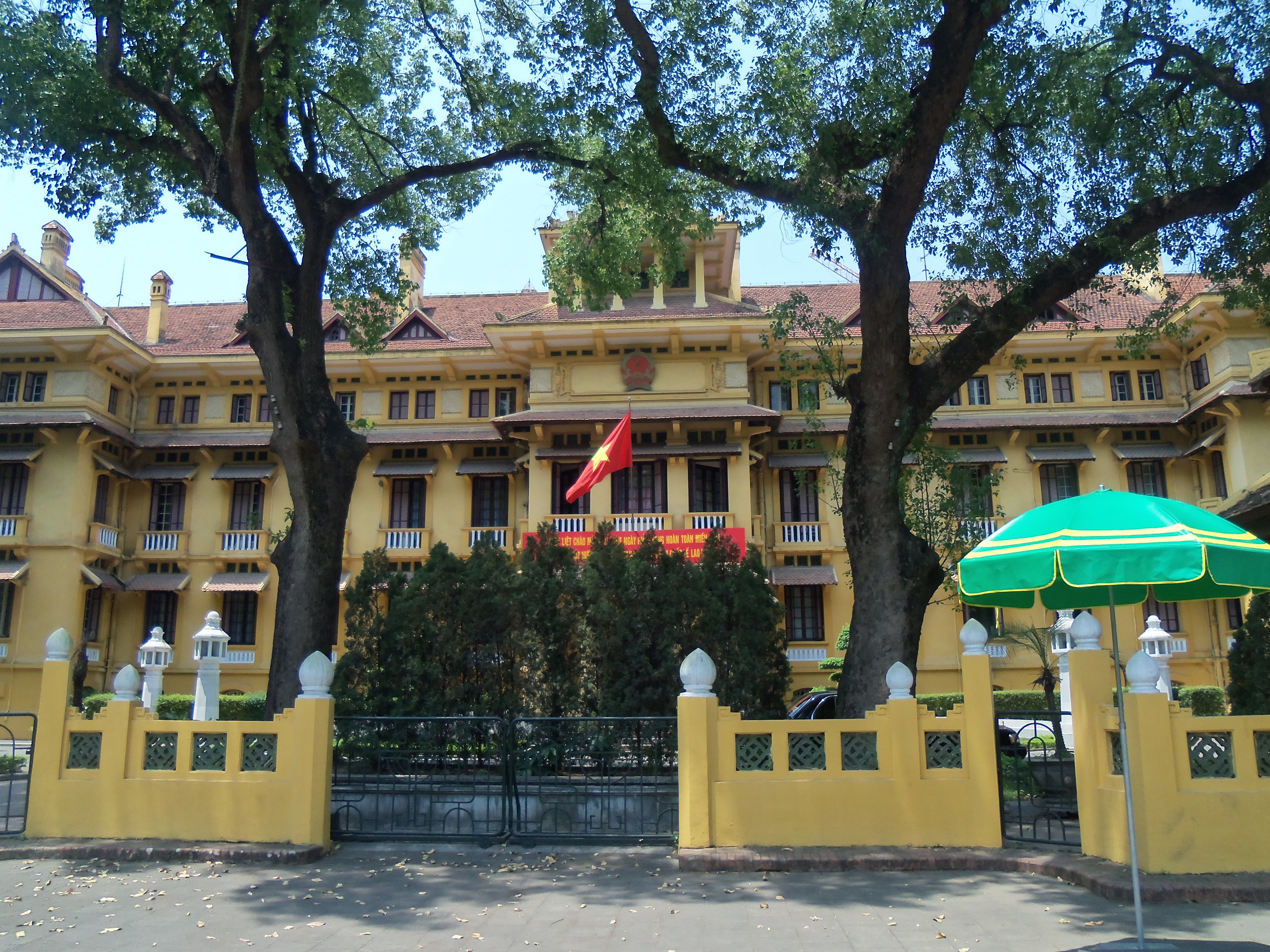
- MoFA ceremonial headquarters. Identified as a major relic, it once hosted the French Indochinese Ministry of Finance.

Ministry overview
- Formed: 28 August 1945
- Type: Government Ministry
- Jurisdiction: Government of Vietnam
- Headquarters: 1 Tôn Thất Đàm, Ba Đình Ward, Hà Nội (current headquarter) 2 Lê Quang Đạo Street, Từ Liêm Ward, Hà Nội (new headquarter)
- Annual budget: 9.2 trillion VND
- Minister responsible: Lê Hoài Trung
- Deputy Minister responsible: Nguyễn Minh Vũ Nguyễn Mạnh Cường Lê Thị Thu Hằng Đặng Hoàng Giang Lê Anh Tuấn Ngô Lê Văn Nguyễn Minh Hằng Nguyễn Hoàng Long Nguyễn Thị Hoàng Vân
- Website: mofa.gov.vn Official Twitter

The Ministry of Foreign Affairs (MOFA) is the central government institution charged with leading the foreign affairs of Vietnam. The current Foreign Minister is Lê Hoài Trung.

According to Vietnamese law, the Ministry of Foreign Affairs is responsible for considering and deciding on the application of the reciprocity principle in relations with other countries, in coordination with other concerned ministries and branches. It then needs to notify the Ministry of Justice of the decision on a biannual and annual basis.

== Organisation ==
=== Ministerial units ===
- Department of ASEAN Affairs
- Department of Southeast Asian – South Asian – South Pacific Affairs
- Department of Northeast Asian Affairs
- Department of European Affairs
- Department of American Affairs
- Department of West Asian – Africa Affairs
- Department of Policy Planning
- Department of International Organisations
- Department of Law and International Treaty
- Department of Multilateral Economic Cooperation
- Department of General Economic Affairs
- Department of External Culture and UNESCO
- Department of Press and Information
- Department of Organisation and Personnel
- Office of the Ministry
- Ministry Inspectorate
- Bureau of Information Security
- Bureau of Consular Affairs
- Bureau of State Protocol
- Bureau of Administration and Finance
- Bureau of Diplomatic Corps Services
- Committee of Overseas Vietnamese
- Committee of National Border
- Intelligence and Analysis Service

=== Administrative units ===
- Ho Chi Minh City Department of Foreign Affairs
- Diplomatic Academy of Vietnam
- Foreign Press Centre
- National Translation and Interpretation Centre
- Information Centre
- Vietnam and the World Newspaper
- Permanent Missions of Vietnam to United Nations and International Organisations
- Vietnamese Embassies
- Vietnamese Consulate-Generals and Consulates
