= Sastrowardoyo family =

The Sastrowardoyo family is an important Javanese family that originated in the 'priyayi' or bureaucratic elite of the Dutch East Indies, and whose later members played a significant role in the Indonesian national awakening and Revolution.

The surname is derived from sastra (Sanskrit, writings) and wardaya (Sanskrit, heart), so it literally means "writings of the heart."

Javanese do not normally have surnames as such. Sutejo, son of Raden Mas Sastrosentono, adopted the surname "Sastrowardojo" (as it was spelled before the spelling reforms) upon his graduation from the civil servants' school about 1900. Sutejo Sastrowardojo was the father of Soenario, Suryono Sastrowardoyo, Sumarsono Sastrowardoyo and Subagio Sastrowardoyo, among others.

Members of the family include:

- Suryono Sastrowardoyo (1920-2000) - Indonesian diplomat who served in Singapore, Italy and Poland
- Sumarsono Sastrowardoyo (1922-2008) - Indonesian physician, urologist and memoirist, author of Kembali ke Uteran; father of Marina Joesoef and paternal grandfather of Dian Sastrowardoyo
- Subagio Sastrowardoyo (1924-1995) - Indonesian poet, literary critic and essayist
- Sanyoto Sastrowardoyo (b. 1936) - former Indonesian state minister for investment and chairman of the Investment Coordination Board (BPKM)
- Aswin W. Sastrowardoyo - Indonesian physician; guitarist and vocalist with the music group Chaseiro
- Marina Joesoef (b. 1959) - Indonesian artist sometimes referred to as Marina Joesoef Sastrowardoyo
- Rahadyan Sastrowardoyo (b. 1963) - American journalist and author of Indonesian and Filipino ancestry
- Hartriono B. Sastrowardoyo (b. 1969) - American journalist of Indonesian and Filipino ancestry
- Dian Sastrowardoyo (b. 1982) - Indonesian model and actress
