= Department of Information (Indonesia) =

- Departemen Penerangan
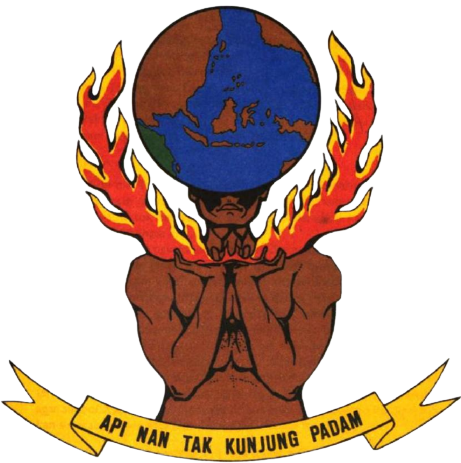
- "The Ever-Burning Fire", the Department of Information emblem

Ministry overview
- Formed: 19 August 1945
- Dissolved: 26 October 1999
- Superseding agencies: State Ministry of Communication and Information (2001–2005); Department of Communication and Informatics (2005–2009); Ministry of Communication and Informatics (2009–2024); Ministry of Communication and Digital Affairs (2024–present)
- Jurisdiction: Government of Indonesia
- Headquarters: Jalan Medan Merdeka Barat 9 Central Jakarta 10110 Jakarta, Indonesia

The Department of Information (Indonesian: Departemen Penerangan, lit. 'Department of Enlightenment', abbreviated Deppen) was a department, and subsequently ministry, of the Indonesian government which was tasked with regulating and developing the press, mass media such as television, film, radio, newspaper, graphics, printing and public information. The department was established in 1945 by President Sukarno. It later developed to become the propaganda wing of the New Order government.

== History ==
=== Establishment and early history ===
The Department of Information was established at the beginning of Indonesian independence with the formation of the government. The first Minister of Information was Amir Sjarifuddin.

The Department of Information had a very broad scope of duties because in the early years of independence, many ministries were not well organized. For example, when members of the army wanted to enter areas of the country controlled by the Dutch, a travel certificate had to be issued by Department of Information.

=== New Order era ===
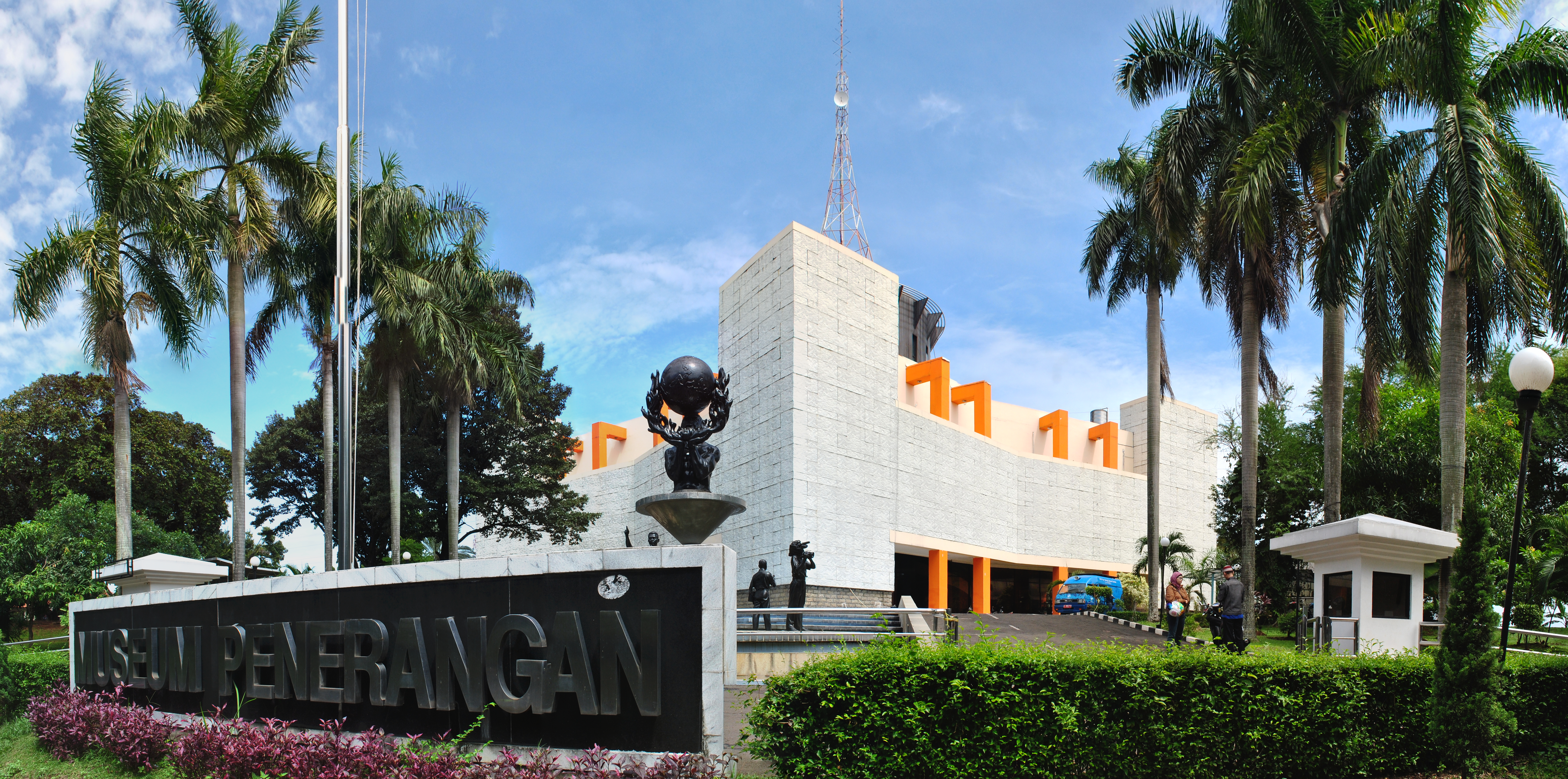
Museum of Information (Museum Penerangan) within Taman Mini Indonesia Indah theme park in East Jakarta, built in 1993 by the Department of Information. Note the department's logo sculpture in front of the museum.

During the New Order era, the Department of Information had a central role, namely controlling information and news, whch was almost entirely in the hands of the government. It acted as a public spokesperson for government programs. As well as political issues, the institution also had to monitor the television industry.

Control of information was almost entirely in the hands of the government, particularly the ministry of information. In 1984, Regulation No. 1/1984 of the Minister of Information was issued, requiring all press publishing companies to have a legal entity as a Limited Liability Company (PT) as a requirement to obtain a Press Publishing Business License (SIUPP).

State broadcasters RRI and TVRI was formally placed under Department of Information's Directorate General of Radio, Television, and Film from this era until the department dissolved.

=== Dissolution ===
During the administration of Abdurrahman Wahid in 1999, the Department of Information was disbanded. This dissolution was carried out because according to President Wahid, it was silencing the freedom of thought of the people. He argued that the Department of Information acted in an authoritarian manner in managing the Indonesian media landscape.

== Ministers ==
The following is a list of ministers of information from 1945 to 1999:

1. Amir Sjarifuddin (1945–1946)
2. Mohammad Natsir (1946–1947, 1948)
3. Setiadi Reksoprodjo (1947)
4. Sjahbuddin Latif (1947–1948)
  Syafruddin Prawiranegara (1948–1949)
5. Raden Sjamsoeddin (1949)
  Arnold Mononutu (1949–1950)
  Raden Sjamsoeddin (1949–1950)
6. Wiwoho Purbohadidjojo (1950)
7. Melkias Agustinus Pellaupessy (1950–1951)
8. Arnold Mononutu (1951–1953)
9. Ferdinand Lumban Tobing (1953–1955)
10. Sjamsuddin Sutan Makmur (1955–1956)
11. Soedibjo (1956–1957, 1957–1959)
  Idham Chalid (1957, acting)
12. Maladi (1960–1962)
13. Mohammad Yamin (1962)
14. Ruslan Abdulgani (1962–1964)
15. Achmadi Hadisoemarto (1964–1966)
16. Wilhelm Johannis Rumambi (1966)
17. B.M. Diah (1966–1968)
18. Boediardjo (1968–1973)
19. Mashuri Saleh (1973–1977)
  Sudharmono (1977–1978, acting)
20. Ali Murtopo (1978–1983)
21. Harmoko (1983–1997)
22. R. Hartono (1997–1998)
23. Alwi Dahlan (1998)
24. Yunus Yosfiah (1998–1999)

== Replacement ==
After the dissolution of the department by President Abdurrahman Wahid, the National Information and Communication Agency (BIKN) was established as a non-ministerial government agency to take over the functions of the former information department. In 2001, President Megawati Soekarnoputri replaced BIKN with the National Information Institute to handle public information services. In the same year, she also established the State Ministry of Communication and Information. In 2005, the institution was renamed the Department of Communication and Informatics. In 2009, it was reorganized as the Ministry of Communication and Informatics. On 21 October 2024, it officially became the Ministry of Communication and Digital Affairs under Presidential Regulation No. 140 of 2024.

== See also ==
- Government Communications Agency (Indonesia), spiritual successor of Department of Information established in 2025
