= List of ambassadors of Indonesia to the United Kingdom =

Ambassador of Indonesia to the United Kingdom Accredited to Ireland and IMO
- Duta Besar Indonesia untuk Britania Raya
- Emblem of the Ministry of Foreign Affairs

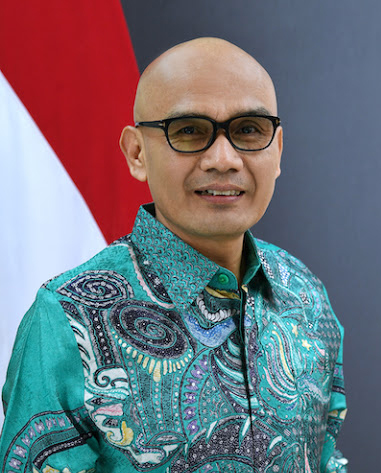
- Incumbent; Desra Percaya since 26 October 2020
- Ministry of Foreign Affairs; Embassy of Indonesia, London
- Seat: London, United Kingdom
- Appointer: President of Indonesia
- Term length: At the President's Pleasure
- Inaugural holder: Soebandrio
- Formation: 1949
- Website: kemlu.go.id/london

The Indonesian ambassador to the United Kingdom, formally the ambassador of the Republic of Indonesia to the Court of St James's, is the official representative of the president and the Indonesian government to the British monarch (the Court of St James's) and the government of the United Kingdom. The position is currently held by Desra Percaya, who presented his credentials to Queen Elizabeth II on June 3, 2021.

The following are the list of Indonesian diplomats that served as Ambassador of the Republic of Indonesia to the United Kingdom of Great Britain and Northern Ireland.

No.	Name	From	Until	Accredited to
1.	Dr. Soebandrio	1949	1954	
2.	Prof. Dr. Soepomo	1954	1956	
3.	Prof. Mr. Soenario, S.H.	1956	1961	
4.	B.M. Diah	1962	1964	
5.	Soerjodipoero	1964	1966	
6.	General Ibrahim Adjie	1966	1970	
7.	Roesmin Noerjadin	1970	1974	
8.	R. Subono	1974	1978	
9.	Saleh Basarah	1978	1981	
10.	B. Syahabuddin Arifin	1981	1985	Ireland
11.	Suhartoyo	1985	1989	Ireland
12.	T.M. Hadi Thayeb	1990	1993	Ireland
13.	Junus Effendi Habibie	1993	1997	Ireland
14.	Rahardjo Jamtomo	1997	1998	Ireland
15.	Nana Sutresna	1999	2002	Ireland
16.	Juwono Sudarsono	2003	2004	Ireland
17.	Marty Natalegawa	2005	2007	Ireland
18.	Yuri Octavian Thamrin	2008	2011	Ireland
19.	Teuku Mohammad Hamzah Thayeb	2012	2016	Ireland
20.	Rizal Sukma	2016	2020	Ireland
21.	Desra Percaya	2020	Present	Ireland

== See also ==
- List of Indonesian ambassadors
- List of diplomatic missions of Indonesia
- Embassy of the United Kingdom, Jakarta
- Foreign relations of the United Kingdom
- List of ambassadors of the United Kingdom to Indonesia
- Indonesia–United Kingdom relations
