= Embassy of Indonesia, London =

Embassy of the Republic of Indonesia in London Kedutaan Besar Republik Indonesia di London

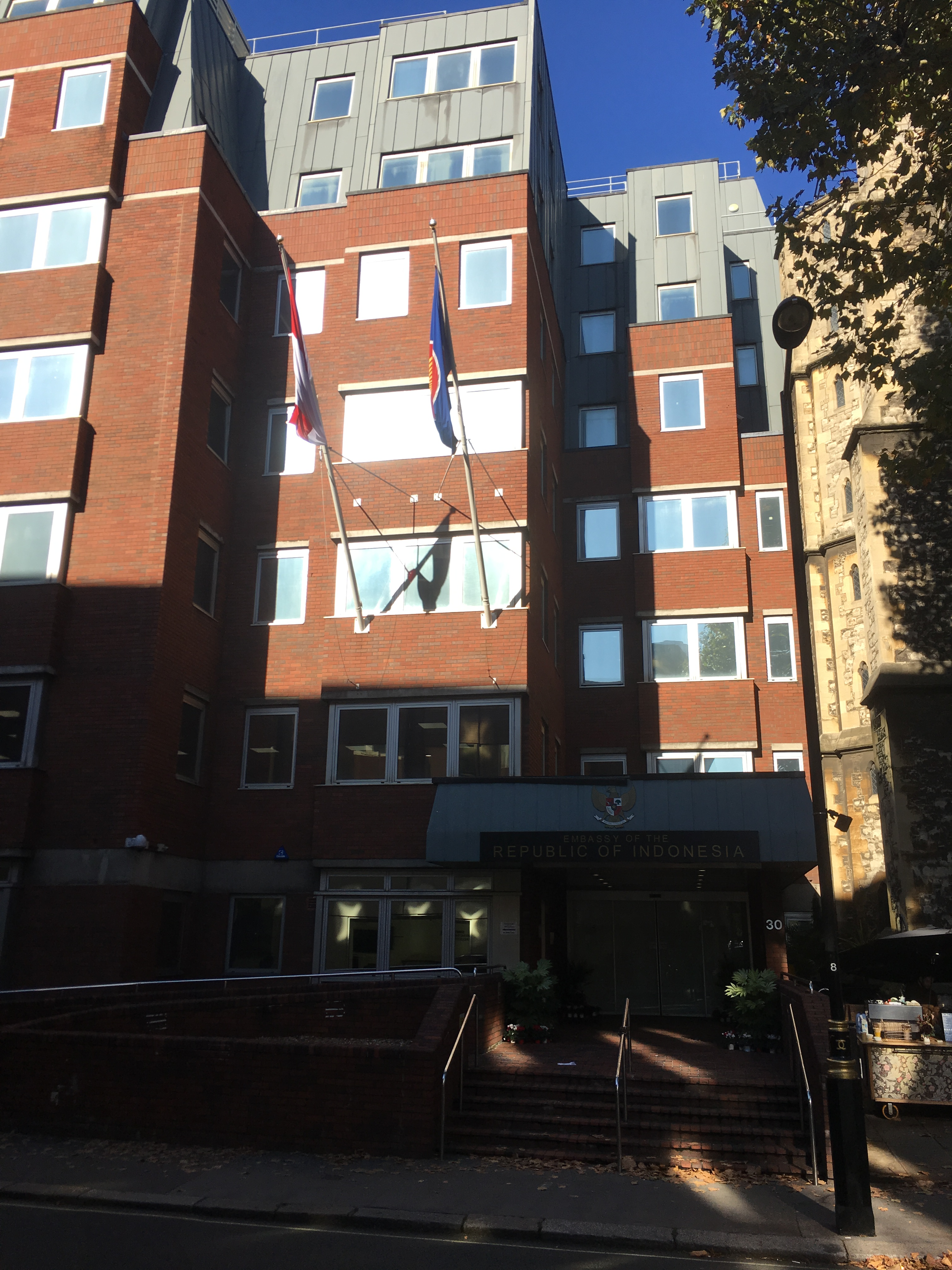
- Location: Westminster, London, UK
- Address: Trevelyan House; 30 Great Peter Street; London SW1P 2BU; United Kingdom
- Ambassador: Desra Percaya
- Jurisdiction: United Kingdom; Ireland; International Maritime Organization
- Website: kemlu.go.id/london/en/

The Embassy of the Republic of Indonesia in London (Indonesian: Kedutaan Besar Republik Indonesia di London) is the diplomatic mission of Indonesia in the United Kingdom and concurrently accredited to Ireland. From shortly after independence until the end of February 2017, the embassy was located at 38 Grosvenor Square, a leasehold building in Mayfair, close to the (now former) location of the American embassy.

On 1 March 2017, the embassy moved to 30 Great Peter Street in Westminster, a 60,000 square foot freehold building purchased by Indonesia for £40 million.

== History ==
Dr. Subandrio was the first diplomatic representative of Indonesia in the United Kingdom, serving from 1949 to 1954. Over the years, there have been 20 ambassadors, including two air marshals, a lieutenant, and Marty Natalegawa, who later became Indonesia's Minister of Foreign Affairs.

The embassy currently comprises 10 departments, which include two Defence Attachés, one Transportation Attaché, one Trade Attaché, and one Educational Attaché.

== Gallery ==
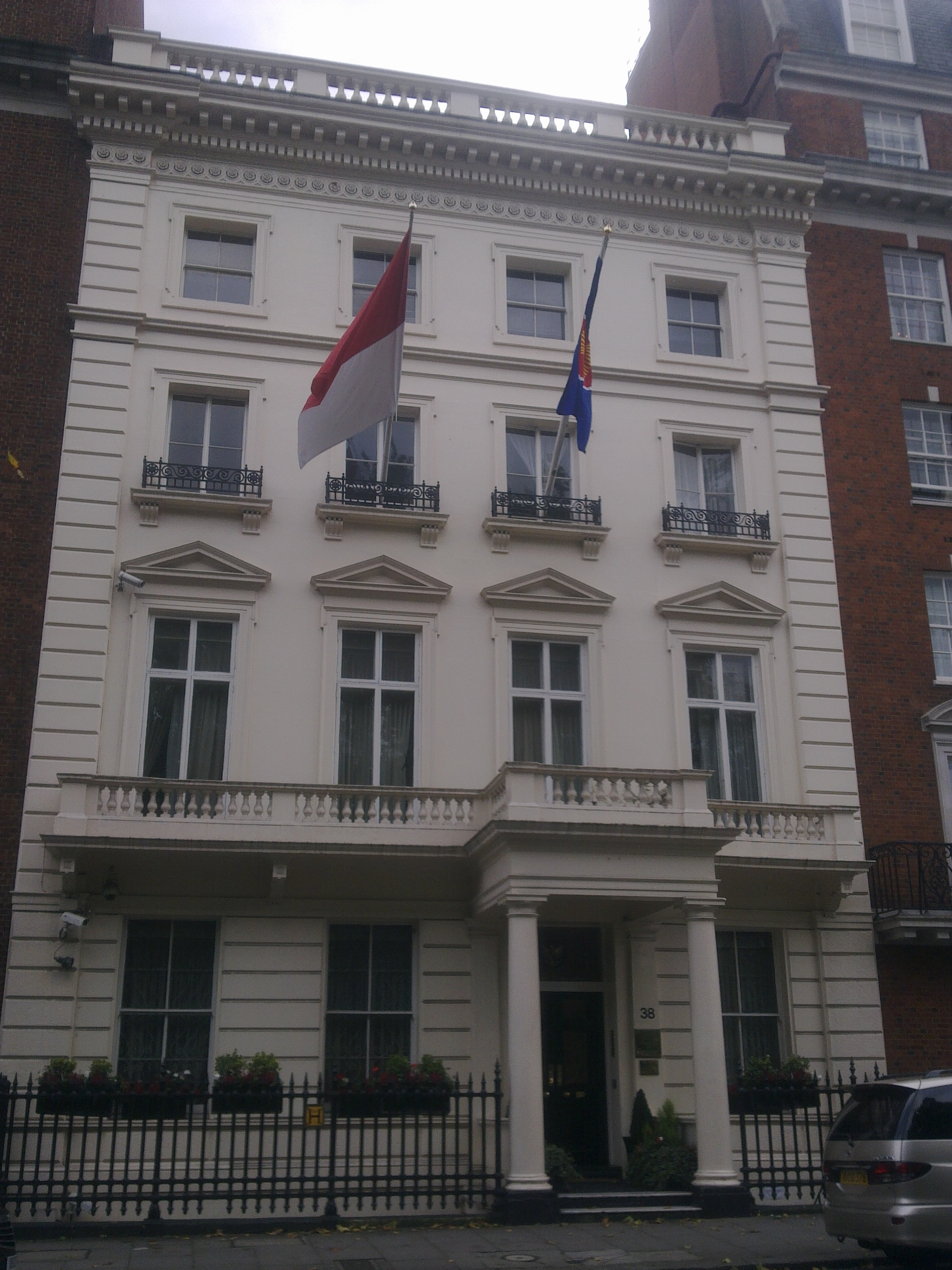
Former chancery at 38 Grosvenor Square

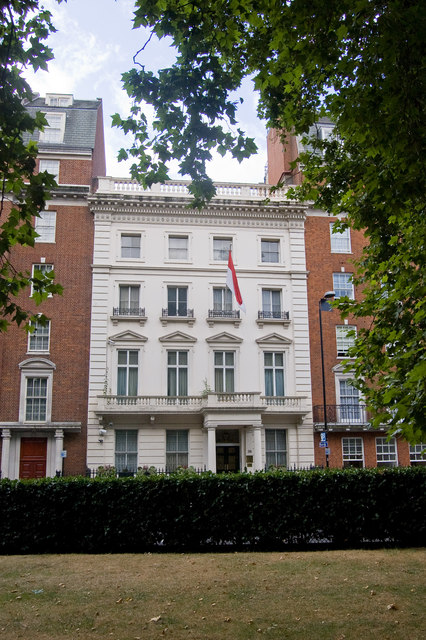
Former chancery at 38 Grosvenor Square

== See also ==
- Indonesia-United Kingdom relations
- List of diplomatic missions of Indonesia
- List of diplomatic missions of United Kingdom
- List of ambassadors of Indonesia to the United Kingdom
