= Junus Effendi Habibie =

Indonesian diplomat (1937–2012)

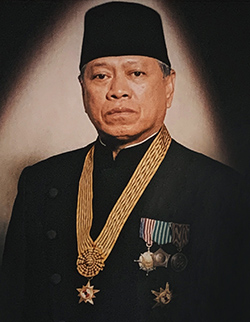

Ambassador to the Netherlands
- In office 7 November 2006 – 31 December 2010
- President: Susilo Bambang Yudhoyono
- Preceded by: Mohammad Jusuf
- Succeeded by: Retno Marsudi

ambassadors of Indonesia to United Kingdom and Ireland
- In office 1993–1998
- President: Soeharto
- Preceded by: Hadi Thayeb
- Succeeded by: Rahardjo Jamtomo

Personal details
- Born: Junus Effendi Habibie; 11 June 1937 Parepare, Dutch East Indies
- Died: 12 March 2012 (aged 74) Central Jakarta, Indonesia
- Citizenship: Indonesian
- Party: Democratic Party
- Spouse: Meike Mariam Habibie
- Relations: Bacharuddin Jusuf Habibie (brother)
- Children: 3
- Parents: Alwi Abdul Jalil Habibie (father); Tuti Marini Puspowardojo (mother)
- Education: Indonesian Naval Academy
- Occupation: Diplomat

Military service
- Allegiance: Indonesia
- Branch/service: Indonesian Navy
- Years of service: 1961–1965
- Rank: Captain

Junus Effendi Habibie (11 June 1937 – 12 March 2012) also known as Fanny Habibie was an Indonesian diplomat and younger brother of the third Indonesian President, B. J. Habibie.

Habibie was born in Parepare as the fifth of eight children. In 1961 he graduated from the Naval Academy in Surabaya. During the New Order he served as director general for marine transportation affairs.

In 1993 he was named Indonesian ambassador the United Kingdom, a position which he held until 1998. During his term in office he held informal talks with Fretilin vice president, Mari Alkatiri, on autonomy for East Timor. Habibie served as chairman of the Batam Island Industrial Development Authority until his brother was named president in 1998.

In 2006 he was named Indonesian ambassador to the Netherlands. In September 2010 he had an interview with Dutch newspaper Het Financieele Dagblad in which he made several remarks about the Party for Freedom and the people who voted for it, amongst others saying that those voters might be suffering from a "fear psychosis". His remarks led to questions in the Dutch parliament by Party for Freedom MPs Geert Wilders and Wim Kortenoeven. In the questions they asked whether Dutch Foreign Ministers Maxime Verhagen was willing to call Habibie over to the Foreign Ministry, Verhagen however did not wish to do so, citing that the remarks were made in freedom of speech and that Habibie had already retracted his words. Another incident occurred when Indonesian President Susilo Bambang Yudhoyono cancelled his planned visit to the Netherlands for October 2010. Indonesia decided to cancel after it received information that the President might be arrested due to a court complaint made by the government-in-exile of the Republic of South Maluku of human rights violations. Habibie's term as ambassador ended late 2011.

Habibie and his brother Bacharuddin Jusuf were befriended with Dutch politician Neelie Kroes.

He died on 12 March 2012 (aged 74), from heart problems at the Cipto Mangunkusumo Hospital in Central Jakarta. He had had bypass surgery two times before.

Diplomatic posts
Preceded by Teuku Mohammad Hadi Thayeb	Ambassador of Indonesia to the United Kingdom; 1993–1998	Succeeded by Rahardjo Jamtomo
Unknown	Ambassador of Indonesia to the Netherlands; 2006–2011	Unknown
