= Hamzah Thayeb =

Indonesian diplomat

Hamzah Thayeb KCVO
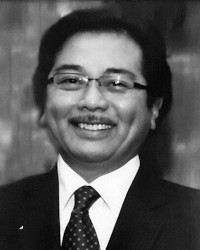
- Thayeb as Indonesia’s Ambassador to Australia

19th Ambassador of Indonesia to the United Kingdom
- In office 21 December 2011 – 23 December 2015
- President: Susilo Bambang Yudhoyono; Joko Widodo
- Preceded by: Yuri Octavian Thamrin
- Succeeded by: Rizal Sukma

20th Ambassador of Indonesia to Australia
- In office 11 November 2005 – 2009
- President: Susilo Bambang Yudhoyono
- Preceded by: Imron Cotan
- Succeeded by: Primo Alui Joelianto

Personal details
- Born: Teuku Mohammad Hamzah Thayeb; May 31, 1952 (age 74) Paris, France
- Spouse: Lastri Thayeb
- Parent: Teuku Mohammad Hadi Thayeb
- Relatives: Teuku Chik Mohammad Thayeb (grandfather); Teuku Mohammad Syarief Thayeb (uncle)
- Education: Jayabaya University
- Occupation: Public servant and diplomat

Teuku Mohammad Hamzah Thayeb (born 31 May 1952) is an Indonesian diplomat. He was Ambassador of Indonesia to Australia between 2005 and 2008 and to the UK between 2011 and 2015.

== Life and career ==
Born in Paris on May 31, 1952, Hamzah Thayeb completed his higher education in international relations at the Jayabaya University in 1982. Hamzah then joined the foreign ministry and completing his diplomatic education in 1984. Prior to his college education, Hamzah had already took on various roles as an employee at Indonesia's ASEAN national secretariat. He served as a public relations officer in 1975, a general officer in 1978, and an economic bureau officer in 1983.

Hamzah's first overseas posting was at the mission in Geneva, where he served in the political section. At that time, his father was posted in the same country as an ambassador residing in Bern. He returned to Jakarta in 1990 to serve at the secretariat of the minister of foreign affairs. After completing his mid-level diplomatic education in 1992, before being posted to the permanent mission of the Republic of Indonesia in New York in 1993, where he worked as a political officer for the Non-Aligned Movement task force. His tenure in New York included significant responsibilities as the coordinator of the UN Security Council task force in 1995 and as the head of the political division for the permanent mission in 1999. During his time in the United States, he engaged in various UN Security Council meetings and committees regarding decolonization and the Organization of Islamic Conference.

Back in Indonesia, he was appointed director of international cooperation and disarmament within the directorate general of multilateral affairs since 3 May 2002, followed by a tenure as the director of East Asia and the Pacific on 7 January 2004. During his tenure, Hamzah attended a special meeting of ASEAN leaders in response to the 2004 Indian Ocean earthquake and tsunami. He also attended the Counter Terrorism Regional Conference in Bali in 2004, the Yogyakarta interfaith dialogue in 2004, and commemorative conferences on the half-decade anniversary of the Bandung Conference.

From 2005 to 2008, Hamzah was ambassador to Australia. He described his ambassadorship in Australia 'a very important posting'. In March 2006, Hamzah faced protests from Papuan and refugee activists over the West Papuan refugee crisis. The Indonesian Government guaranteed the Papuan's safety and Hamzah said he did not understand why the West Papuans had sought asylum to begin with. Hamzah was temporarily recalled to Indonesia when the Australian Government granted the Papuans asylum. He arrived back in Canberra in June 2006.

After his ambassadorial tenure, he became the director general of Asia, Pacific, and Africa on 3 November 2008. He oversaw Indonesia's relations with 138 different countries. According to him, his director-generalship taught him about novel approaches to maintain friendly relations with different countries.

On 21 December 2011, Hamzah became Indonesia's ambassador to the United Kingdom, with concurrent accreditation to Ireland. As his father Hadi Thayeb had previously held the same ambassadorial posting in the early 1990s, Hamzah described living in the same residence as his father had used to as "odd but comforting". He arrived in London at the end of January 2012 and returned to Jakarta twice not long after for a heads of mission conference in February and prime minister David Cameron's visit in April. During the latter, Cameron announced a deal to sell Airbus planes to Indonesia's flag carrier Garuda Indonesia, a move by Cameron intended to intensify bilateral trade. On the same year, Hamzah was part of a reciprocal state visit by president Susilo Bambang Yudhoyono to the United Kingdom. He was appointed an Honorary Knight Commander of the Royal Victorian Order. In 2013, Hamzah was named 'Diplomat of the Year from Asia 2013' by The Diplomat, whilst serving as Indonesian Ambassador to the United Kingdom and Ireland.

Diplomatic posts
| Preceded by Imron Cotan | Ambassador of Indonesia to Australia; 2005–2008 | Succeeded by Primo Alui Joelianto |
| Preceded by Yuri Octavian Thamrin | Ambassador of Indonesia to the United Kingdom; 2012–2016 | Succeeded by Rizal Sukma |
