= Rahadyan Sastrowardoyo =

- Sastrowardoyo in 1991
- Born: March 31, 1963 (age 63); New York City
- Occupations: writer, staff editor, contributing editor
- Writing career
- Period: 1977-2009, 2013-present
- Genres: non-fiction, poetry, plays
- Subjects: race, ethnicity, popular culture, science-fiction fandom, 9/11, healthcare

Rahadyan Timoteo Sastrowardoyo (born March 31, 1963, in New York City) is a writer, editor and photographer. He is an American of Indonesian and Filipino ancestry.

Sastrowardoyo was raised on the Upper West Side of Manhattan, and attended P.S. 163 and The Collegiate School as an elementary school student.

His tertiary education was at New York University and The New School.

== Career ==
Sastrowardoyo began his journalism career as a reporter, copy editor and photographer on his junior high school and high school newspapers in Brentwood, New York. He was editor-in-chief of the Brentwood High School yearbook in 1981, which won honorable mentions from the American Scholastic Press Association and the Columbia Scholastic Press Association. Sastrowardoyo was also news director for WXBA-FM.

His first paying job was as an events photographer for the Brentwood school district. He has since dabbled in wedding photography, wedding videography, dance photography, and theatrical photography for Deborah Savadge's Woodstock Theatre Company (based in New Paltz, New York) and Algonquin Productions.

After working at Banque Indosuez, Dial Germany/Dial Bavaria (a travel wholesaler) and Marubeni America Corporation, Sastrowardoyo was hired as a copyboy at The New York Times in the fall of 1987. From 1988 to 2006, he was on the staff of the cultural news desk, and named a staff editor in 1999. From March 2006 to December 2009, he worked on the foreign news desk. Sastrowardoyo worked at the Times's United Nations bureau in November and December 2007.

Sastrowardoyo studied acting with Deborah Savadge beginning in the fall of 1989, ostensibly as a means to help him deal with his shyness. It was instrumental in helping him deal with his brother Sabartomo's death a few years previously. He has also studied poetry with Kimiko Hahn, Richard Tayson and Li-Young Lee; performance with Beau Sia and the Asian American troupe Peeling; playwriting with Julia Cho and David Henry Hwang; photography with Charles Gatewood; dance with Ducky DooLittle and Pamardi Tjiptopradonggo; and writing with Rachel Kramer Bussel and Paul Levitz.

In 1989 and 1990, Sastrowardoyo was a contributing editor for volumes 7 and 8 of Contemporary Theater, Film and Television, a reference series published by Gale Research (now known as Thomson Gale).

In the summer of 1990, Sastrowardoyo and some classmates from Deborah Savadge's acting class (directed by Guy Ventoliere) performed a series of one-act plays, originally performed by the Actors Theatre of Louisville, as a benefit for Coalition for the Homeless.

Sastrowardoyo gave a poetry reading at the Asian American Writers Workshop in January 2000. His one-act play, Lessons Learned, was scheduled to be read at AAWW on September 11, 2001, but the events of that day postponed its reading until September 24, 2001.

Sastrowardoyo retired from the Times in 2009.

== Personal ==
Sastrowardoyo is the eldest son of Sumarsongko H. Sastrowardoyo (1929-2018), born in Bandung, West Java, Indonesia, of the Economics and Information staff of the Consulate General of Indonesia, and Teresita M. Sastrowardoyo (1933-2020), born in Maasin, Iloilo, the Philippines, an operating room registered nurse. They were married at Calvary Baptist Church in New York City in 1962.

Sastrowardoyo's middle brother, Sabartomo Daniel Sastrowardoyo (1965–1986), died in an accident at Fall Creek in Ithaca, New York while a student at Cornell University. His youngest brother, Hartriono Benjamin Sastrowardoyo (b. 1969), is a reporter and online producer for the Asbury Park Press.

Sastrowardoyo is a nephew of Soenario (1902–1997), Indonesia's minister of foreign affairs from 1953 to 1955; and Subagio Sastrowardoyo (1924–1995), a noted poet, writer, essayist and literary critic. He is also a cousin of Sunaryati Hartono (1931-2023) and Astrid Susanto (1936–2006), officials in the Indonesian government; and Marina Joesoef (b. 1959), an Indonesian artist.

Sastrowardoyo is a first cousin once removed of the Indonesian actress Dian Sastrowardoyo (b. 1982).

His surname is derived from shastra (Sanskrit, writings) and hridaya (Sanskrit, heart), so literally means "writings of the heart." His given name reportedly means "of noble blood" or "noble-hearted." His first middle name was after his maternal grandfather, who died in 1952.

His paternal grandfather, Sutejo Sastrowardoyo (1878–1967), traced the family's ancestry back to 15th century Java.

Sastrowardoyo was raised Baptist but left the church in 1978. He reverted to Islam in 2002.

As of 2025, Sastrowardoyo was writing a non-fiction book on the challenges of being an adult caregiver for Asian immigrant parents.

== Trivia ==
- Sastrowardoyo was one of the subjects of a practical joke on April 1, 2001, where his name was put in place of an actor's name in The New York Times's database of films.
- Sastrowardoyo wears a bracelet on his right wrist in memory of Michael H. Waye, a junior high and high school friend who was killed in the 9/11 attacks.
- On September 25, 2011, Sastrowardoyo spoke briefly at the memorial service for Nathaniel Rand, a Cornell University student who had died in a similar manner to Sastrowardoyo's brother Sabartomo.
- From 2010 to about 2016, Sastrowardoyo was cyberstalked by a former classmate and their family, who attempted to force him to write an IP for which they could take credit.
- Sastrowardoyo was tuckerized as a character in Dayton Ward's Star Trek novel, The Fall: Peaceable Kingdoms, published in December 2013.

== Bibliography ==
=== Journalism ===
Print

- "Babylon 5 Enters Its Final Stages." The New York Times, July 19, 1998.
- "Writing away for tickets, or trying to get on camera." (sidebar to Matt Lee and Ted Lee's "American Cities: Who Wants to Be in the Audience?") The New York Times, May 14, 2000.
- "For Young Viewers: Pooh's New Adventures, in a 100-Gigabyte Wood." The New York Times, January 21, 2001.
- Review of Better Luck Tomorrow. Community News (Browns Mills, NJ), 2002.

Online

- "Flashpoints That Define Or Break Apart a Community." Rediff.com, 01 June 1999 Accessed March 27, 2007.

=== Fandom journalism ===
Sastrowardoyo has written book reviews, wedding coverage, an obituary, an essay on 9/11 and an article on The Explorers Club (co-written with Hartriono B. Sastrowardoyo) for the Communiqué, a publication of STARFLEET International.

=== Fiction ===
Sastrowardoyo has written erotic fiction under a pseudonym. One of his stories was in Big Book of Orgasms: 69 Sexy Stories, an anthology edited by Rachel Kramer Bussel and published in 2013.

He has also written Star Trek fan-fiction that was published in STARFLEET International publications such as Hypospray, Event Horizon, and S.T.A.R., in 2025 and 2026.

=== Photography ===
- Daily Freeman (Kingston, NY), 2002.
- Chronogram Magazine (New Paltz, NY), 2002.

=== Books ===
As contributing editor

- Contemporary Theatre, Film and Television, volumes 7 and 8. Detroit: Gale Research, 1989 and 1990.
