= Wiranto Arismunandar =

Indonesian academic and minister (1933–2021)

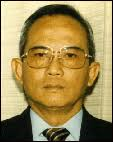

Minister of Education and Culture
- In office 14 March 1998 – 21 May 1998
- President: Suharto
- Preceded by: Wardiman Djojonegoro
- Succeeded by: Juwono Sudarsono

Personal details
- Born: 19 November 1933 Semarang, Central Java, Dutch East Indies
- Died: 19 May 2021 (aged 87) Jakarta, Indonesia
- Party: Golkar
- Relatives: Wismoyo Arismunandar (brother); Edi Sudradjat (brother-in-law)

Wiranto Arismunandar (19 November 1933 – 19 May 2021) was an Indonesian academic. He served as the rector of the Bandung Institute of Technology from 1988 until 1997 and as a minister of education and culture for two months in 1998.

== Early life ==
Wiranto Arismunandar was born on 19 November 1933 as the son of Raden Arismunandar, an official in the forest service. Due to his father's job, Wiranto often moved from place to place. Wiranto finished his high school education in Semarang in 1953 and entered the Bandung Institute of Technology. He graduated from the university in 1959 with a mechanical engineering degree. A year later, he obtained a master's degree in mechanical engineering from Purdue University. He decided to pursue further studies and began a doctoral program at Stanford University, but was forced to return to Indonesia in 1962 due to a shortage of academic lecturers.

== Academic career ==
After returning to Indonesia, Wiranto became a lecturer at the Bandung Institute of Technology (ITB). He held various positions in the institute, beginning as the Secretary of the Engineering Department from 1963 until 1965, chairman of the department from 1966 until 1968, Assistant Dean of the Electronic and Mechanical Engineering Department from 1968 until 1970, and Assistant Rector for Student Affairs from 1969 until 1977. Between his ascension from the secretary to the chairman of the engineering department, he attended a lecture on rocket propulsion at the University of Tokyo. He was promoted to professor of thermodynamics in the ITB in 1972.

On 16 February 1978, Wiranto was installed as a member of the ITB rectory, a collective leadership consisting of four assistant rectors. The rectory replaced the office of ITB rector after its last officeholder, Iskandar Alisjahbana, was ousted by the education minister due to his support for the anti-government student movement at that time. Several months later, in May 1978, Wiranto became the Vice Chairman of the National Institute of Aeronautics and Space (LAPAN).

After a year, the rectory was dissolved in May 1979 and Wiranto returned to his old office as vice rector. The Director General of Higher Education—who was also a former ITB rector—Tisna Amidjaja, was appointed to hold the office in an acting capacity. Tisna then put Wiranto in charge of coordinating ITB activities whenever he was absent. After a definitive officeholder for the rectorate was elected, Wiranto pursued a full-time career as the vice chairman of LAPAN.

== Rector of ITB ==
Wiranto was installed as the new rector of ITB on 12 December 1988, replacing Hariadi Paminto Soepangkat who had served as rector for two terms. He was re-elected for a second term and was installed on 8 January 1993.

=== Students and political activities ===
During his first months as rector, Wiranto conducted a persuasive method to close the gap between himself and the campus students, where he would often attend students' meetings and extracurricular activities. However, in August 1989, he rapidly reversed this approach after the 5 August incident occurred. The incident happened when 17 students walked out and rejected the presence of Minister of Home Affairs Rudini when he was about to give a speech at the institute. As a response, Wiranto expelled the students, and two other student activists were abducted in the following days. Later on, the number of students who were either expelled or given severe warnings grew rapidly.

While the Minister of Education Fuad Hassan did not take any clear position regarding Wiranto's measures, university students from all around Indonesia sided with the expelled and abducted students. The first solidarity protest was conducted when Ondos, an ITB student, went on a hunger strike starting on 4 September. Since then, protests inside and outside ITB occurred using various methods such as hunger strikes or rallies. Wiranto responded to these protests by stating that the students received money from an undisclosed source and refused to support them.

Following the protests, the military began to take action against the students. The coordinating body for national stability (Bakorstanas)—a newly formed military body at that time—was instructed to quell and suppress the protests, marking the first time Bakorstanas was assigned to deal with political unrest. Wiranto was sent abroad by the government during this period, thus allowing the military to freely exert their authority over ITB.

After he handled this incident, Wiranto gained notoriety as an authoritarian rector due to his harsh stance on students and political activities. His harsh punishments for minor incidents caused students to file a lawsuit against him.

=== Nomination as a legislative candidate ===
Other controversies during his tenure as rector arose when he was nominated as a legislative candidate for the People's Representative Council from the West Java electoral district by the Golkar party several months before the 1992 Indonesian legislative election. He was placed at number 92 in Golkar's party list for West Java. His nomination as a legislative candidate was met with disapproval from university students. In a Gadjah Mada University student senate meeting led by Anies Baswedan, the meeting resulted in a decision that the nomination of rectors as a vote-getter was an attempt to politicize the university for the benefit of political power.

In defense of Wiranto, other university rectors and Fuad Hassan stated that the nomination of Wiranto is part of a person's right to vote and to be voted for. Wiranto himself stated that his nomination would not drag the institution into politics.

== Minister of Education and Culture ==
After his term as rector ended in January 1997, Wiranto was appointed by Suharto to serve as Minister of Education and Culture in the Seventh Development Cabinet, which would later become Suharto's last and shortest-lived cabinet. His appointment to the cabinet was alleged to be related to his familial connections. His wife was the elder sister of Commander-in-Chief of the Armed Forces Edi Sudradjat, while his brother was the brother-in-law of First Lady Siti Hartinah.

During this time, student protests against Suharto were mounting in various major cities. In response to the unrest, Wiranto held a meeting with all of Indonesia's rectors. Wiranto stated that such protests were illegal as they were an act of "practical politics" within academic boundaries. However, the more liberal Justice Minister Muladi—who was also a rector before being appointed to the cabinet (Note: At the time of this meeting, Muladi still held office as the Rector of the Gadjah Mada University, thus allowing him to participate.)—argued that there was no clear definition as to what constitutes "practical politics" and that the students have a right to protest within campus grounds. Shortly after this incident, Suharto resigned from his presidency on 21 May 1998, effectively dissolving the cabinet and ending Wiranto's tenure as minister.

== Death ==
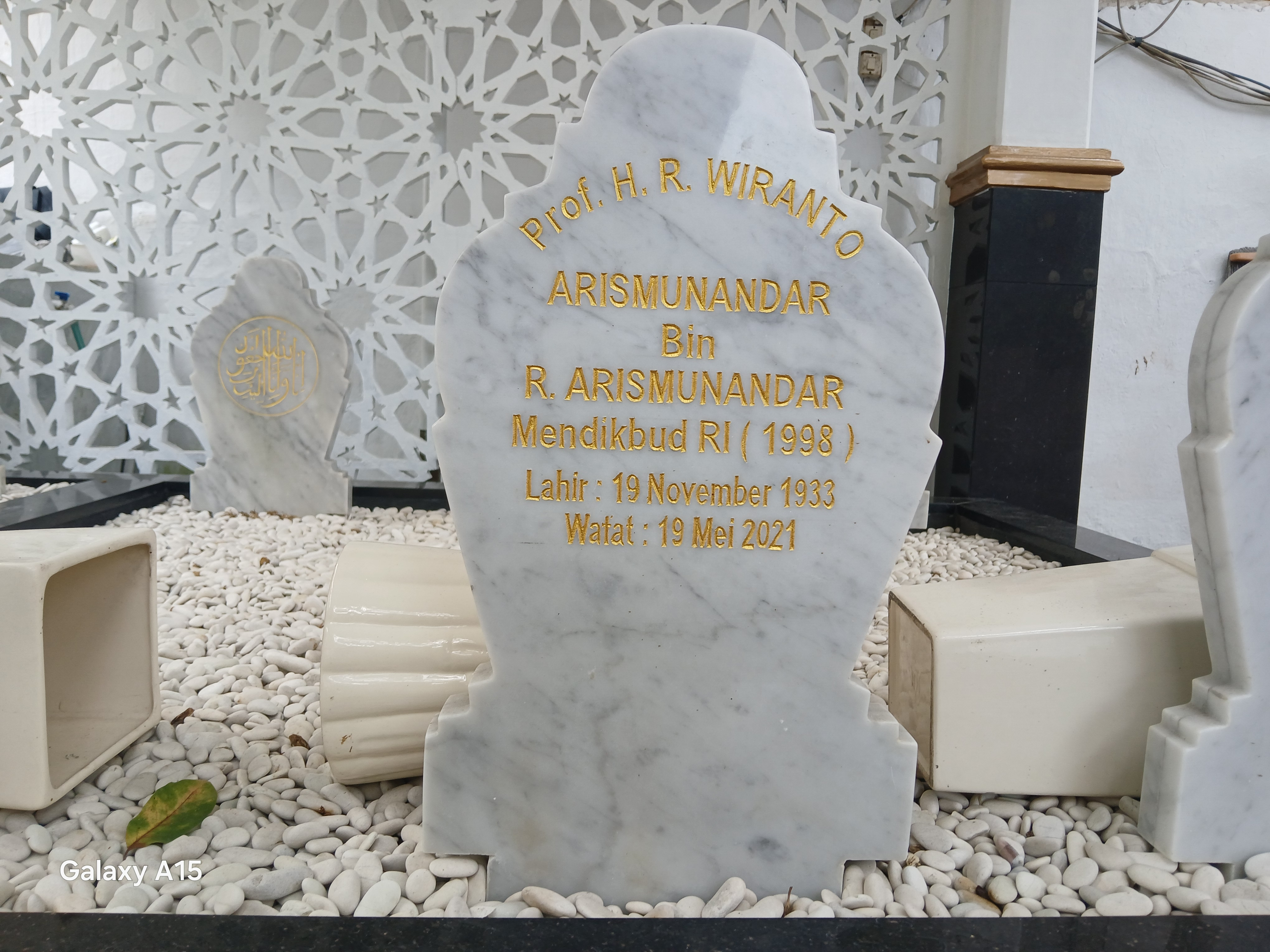
Wiranto Arismunandar's grave

Wiranto died at the Pondok Indah Hospital, Jakarta, at approximately 13.00 local time, on 19 May 2021. His body was laid at a funeral home in ITB before being buried in Bandung the next day.
