= Hotel Aryaduta Jakarta =

Luxury hotel in Indonesia

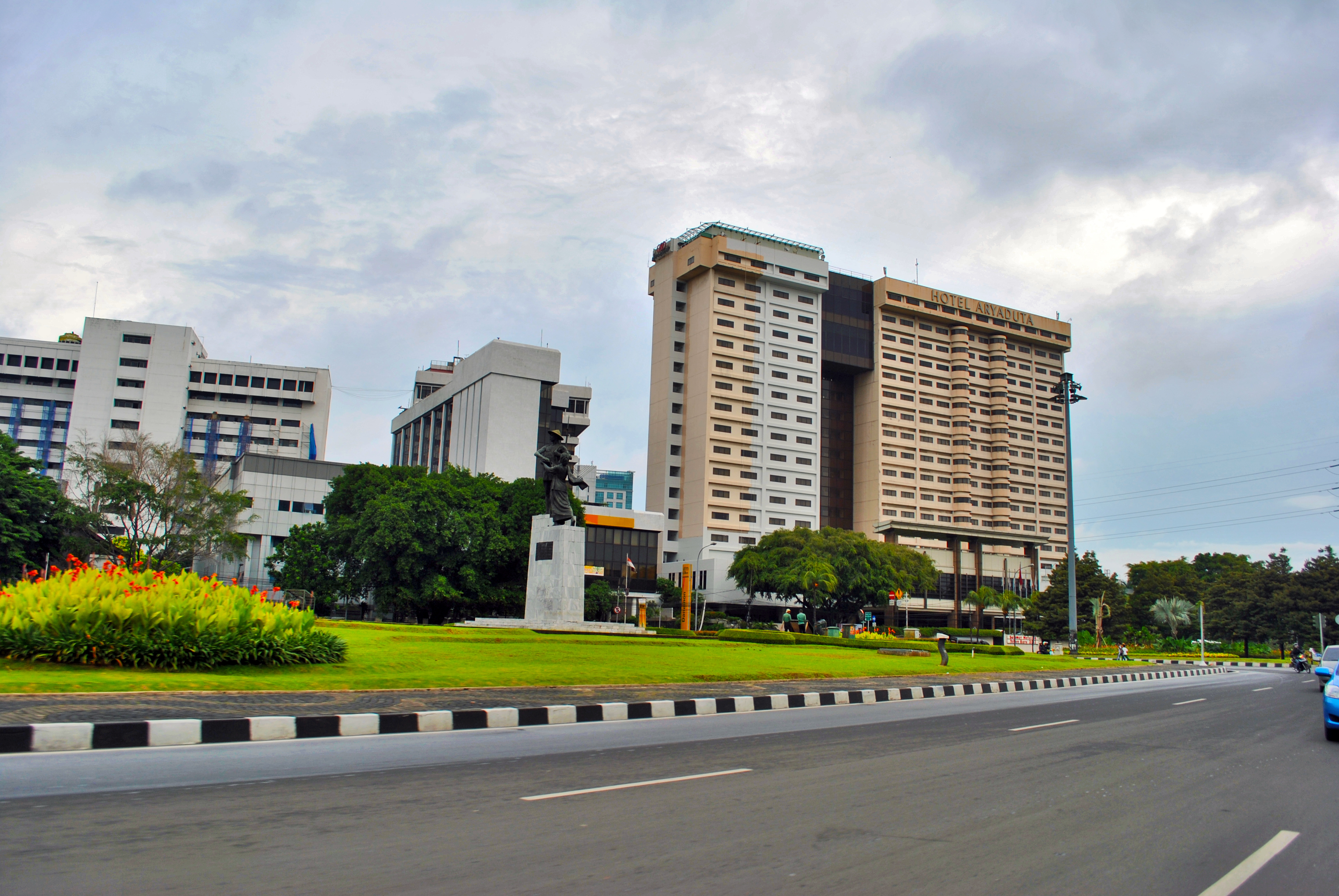
- Hotel Aryaduta to the right, with the Heroes Monument
- Interactive map of the Hotel Aryaduta Jakarta area

General information
- Type: Hotel
- Architectural style: International Style
- Location: Jakarta, Indonesia, Jl. Prajurit KKO Usman & Harun 44-48 Jakarta 10110, Indonesia
- Coordinates: 6°10′54″S 106°50′6″E
- Construction started: 1971
- Opened: June 1974
- Demolished: 1988
- Owner: Lippo Group

Other information
- Seating capacity: 1,100
- Number of rooms: 325
- Number of restaurants: 4
- Number of bars: 1
- Facilities: Fitness center, swimming pool, spa

Website
- www.aryaduta.com/hotels_home_jakarta.php

Hotel Aryaduta Jakarta is a luxury hotel in Gambir, Jakarta, Indonesia. It is located at a strategic place in Central Jakarta, and is one of the most prominent building around the park where the Heroes Monument of Jakarta is located. Hotel Aryaduta Jakarta was among the many hotels of Jakarta that was built in the 1970s as a strategy to attract more investors into the country.

== History ==
Following the election of Suharto as a president of Indonesia in 1967, a new policy was introduced to boost economic growth in Indonesia by promoting foreign investment in its capital Jakarta. Ali Sadikin, governor of Jakarta, prepared the city's infrastructure for the new policy with the construction of the Jakarta Convention Center (1974) and several hotel projects. The 1970s saw a hotel building boom in Jakarta, with the opening of nine major hotels.

Construction of the Hotel Ambassador started in 1971. It was designed by Thai architect Wirachai Wongpanit and developed by the prominent journalists and owner of newspapers Merdeka and Indonesian Observer B.M. Diah and Herawati Diah on land where the home of Herawati Diah's parents stood. The 216-room hotel opened on June 1, 1974, managed by French airline UTA.

On 1 January 1976, the hotel became the Hyatt Aryaduta Jakarta, under a 10-year contract between PT Aryaduta Hotel Tbk and Hyatt International. The contract was renewed multiple times.

In 1985, an extension was constructed on the west side of the original hotel tower. The new Ambassador Wing consisted of 115 rooms, increasing the hotel's size to 341 rooms. The new wing was opened on December 7, 1986. The opening ceremony was attended by Siti Hartinah, the wife of President Suharto.

In 1990, the hotel received a rating of Five Stars and AAA One-Diamond rating. Though it continued to be managed by Hyatt, the hotel dropped the Hyatt name in 1991, due to the opening of the nearby Grand Hyatt Jakarta, and became The Aryaduta Jakarta. In January 1995, The Aryaduta Jakarta received the Adikarya Wisata Award 1994 for its excellent service. In August 1995, The Aryaduta Jakarta changed its name to Hotel Aryaduta Jakarta, due to a government decree mandating the use of Bahasa Indonesian.

In March 1997, the Lippo Group bought a share of the hotel from Nurman Diah, who owned a share in PT. Hotel Prapatan, Tbk. In 2000, the Lippo group bought full ownership of the hotel from PT. Hotel Prapatan. The hotel ceased to be managed by Hyatt on November 1, 2008.

== Aryaduta Hotels ==
Lippo Group now operates a number of hotels in the brand name Aryaduta. These are as follows,

- Aryaduta Jakarta
- Aryaduta Semanggi
- Aryaduta Lippo Village
- Aryaduta Bandung
- Aryaduta Medan
- Aryaduta Bali
- Aryaduta Makassar
- Aryaduta Palembang
- Aryaduta Manado
- Aryaduta Pekanbaru
- Aryaduta Residences Surabaya

== Cited works ==
- Merrillees, Scott (2015). Jakarta: Portraits of a Capital 1950-1980. Jakarta: Equinox Publishing. ISBN 9786028397308.
