= Sunaryati Hartono =

Indonesian attorney, lawyer, professor of law and government official

- Born: Carolina Felicita Gerardine Sunaryati Sastrowardoyo; 7 July 1931 (age 95); Medan, North Sumatra, Dutch East Indies (now Indonesia)
- Occupations: Attorney; lawyer; diplomat; author
- Spouse: Antonius Borromaeus Hartono Sosroseputro
- Parents: Sunario Sastrowardoyo; Dina Maria Geraldine Maranta Pantouw
- Relatives: Astrid Susanto (sister); Rahadyan Sastrowardoyo (cousin); Dian Sastrowardoyo (grand cousin)

Sunaryati Hartono, S.H. (born Carolina Felicita Gerardine Sunaryati Sastrowardoyo; 7 July 1931) is an Indonesian attorney, lawyer, professor of law and government official. She has been vice chairman of the National Ombudsman Commission of Indonesia since 2000.

== Family ==
Hartono is the eldest daughter of Soenario (1902–1997), Indonesian minister of foreign affairs in the mid-1950s and ambassador to the court of St. James, and Dina Maria Geraldine Maranta (née Pantouw) Soenario (?–1995). A sister, Astrid Susanto, deputy chairwoman of the People's Representative Council's Commission I, died in 2006. One younger sister, Sunardien, is an economist and her youngest sister, Wuryastuti Sunario, is managing director of the Indonesia Tourism Promotion Board. A brother, Irawan Sunario, lives in Jakarta.

Hartono's husband was Antonius Borromaeus Hartono Sosroseputro.

== Bibliography ==
- In Search of New Legal Principles (1979) ASIN B0006E4JRU
- Apakah Rule of Law Itu? (1982)
- Politik Hukum Menuju Satu Sistem Hukum Nasional (1991) ISBN 979-414-201-8
- Penelitian Hukum Di Indonesia Pada Akhir Abad Ke-20 (1994) ISBN 979-414-498-3
- Business and the Legal Profession in an Age of Computerization and Globalization (2000)
- The Indonesian Law on Contracts (2001)
- Political Change and Legal Reform towards Democracy and Supremacy of Law in Indonesia (2002)
- Bhinneka Tunggal Ika: Sebagai Asas Hukum bagi Penbangunan Hukum Nasional. Bandung: Penerbit PT Citra Aditya Bakti, 2006. ISBN 979-414-941-1

=== As editor ===
- (with Hendarman Djarab and Lili Irahali) Semangat Kebangsaan Dan Politik Luar Negeri Indonesia : Peringatan 100 Tahun Prof. Mr. Sunario, Mantan Menteri Luar Negeri, Perintis Kemerdekaan, 28 Agustus 1902-28 Agustus 2002. Bandung: Penerbit Angkasa Bandung, 2002. ISBN 979-665-193-9
