= B.M. Diah =

Indonesian politician and diplomat (1917–1996)

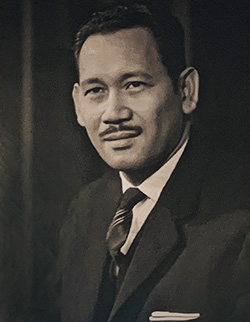
- Official portrait, c. 1962

18th Minister of Information
- In office 25 July 1966 – 6 June 1968
- Preceded by: W.J. Rumambi
- Succeeded by: Boediardjo

4th Ambassador of Indonesia to the United Kingdom
- In office 1962–1964
- Preceded by: Soenario
- Succeeded by: Soerjodipoero

Personal details
- Born: Burhanuddin; 7 April 1917 Kutaraja, Dutch East Indies
- Died: 10 June 1996 (aged 79) Jakarta, Indonesia
- Spouse: Herawati Diah
- Occupation: Politician; journalist

Burhanuddin Mohammad Diah (7 April 1917 – 10 June 1996), born only as Burhanuddin, was an Indonesian journalist, diplomat, and businessman, who served as the 18th Indonesian Minister of Information from 1966 until 1968, under the presidencies of Sukarno and Suharto, during the transition to the New Order. He was present at the time of the Proclamation of Independence was being formulated, and was a figure who played an important role in saving the original text of the Proclamation.

Born in Banda Aceh, on 7 April 1917. He was educated at the Hollandsch-Inlandsche School (HIS) and continued his education at Taman Siswa Medan. He migrated to Jakarta, and studied at the Ksatrian Instituut, majoring in journalism. He worked as a newspaper editor and later worked at a number of media positions during the Japanese occupation of the Dutch East Indies. He was present at the creation of the Proclamation of Independence, and he saved the original handwritten draft of the proclamation by Sukarno, after taking the draft from a trash can.

After Indonesia's independence, he served in government, becoming ambassadors to both Communist Hungary and Czechoslovakia. In 1964, he was appointed Ambassador to the United Kingdom, and later became the Minister of Information in 1966, during the uneasy transition to the New Order. Later he served in the People's Representative Council and the Supreme Advisory Council. He also founded a hotel in Jakarta, the Hyatt Aryaduta. He died on 10 June 1996, his body was interred at the Kalibata Heroes' Cemetery in a military ceremony, with Harmoko acting as the ceremonial inspector.

== Biography ==
=== Early life and education ===
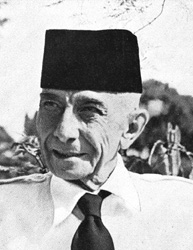
Ernest Douwes Dekker

Burhanuddin Mohammad Diah, born only as Burhanuddin, was born on 7 April 1917, in Kuta Raja (now Banda Aceh). His father was Mohammad Diah, a customs officer and translator from Barus, North Sumatra. While his mother was an Acehnese housewife named Siti Sa'idah. He was the youngest of 8 children, he also has two half brothers from his father's second marriage. He grew up moderately wealthy, though a week after his birth, his father died. His mother took over responsibility of him, before dying 8 years later, resulting in him being raised by his older sister, Siti Hafsyah. He underwent his education at the Hollandsch-Inlandsche School (HIS) and continued his education at Taman Siswa Medan. When he was 17 years old, he migrated to Jakarta and studied at the Ksatrian Instituut, which was led by Ernest Douwes Dekker, where he majored in journalism.

=== Career ===
==== Pre-independence career ====
After graduating, he returned to Medan and became editor of the daily Sinar Deli. A year and a half later, he returned to Jakarta and worked at the Sin Po daily as a temporary worker. Soon, he moved to Warta Harian, though Seven months later, the newspaper was disbanded because it was considered a security hazard. Burhanuddin later set up his own business, the monthly Pertjatoeran Doenia.

After the Japanese invaded and occupied the Dutch East Indies, Burhanuddin worked at Radio Hosokyoku as an English broadcaster. At the same time he also worked at Asia Raya as an assistant editor. In April 1945, with his wife, he founded an English-language newspaper, the Indonesian Observer. When it was discovered that he also worked elsewhere, he was sent to prison for four days. In June 1945 Diah was involved in the founding of the Indonesian New Forces Movement, a federation of youth groups for the struggle for Indonesian independence. The meeting was held at Villa Isola in Bandung. Diah was appointed chairman of the founding committee.

"The New Forces movement that I lead is a group of young people who are eager to do something, want to act, are restless in their dynamics and militancy to consciously determine the fate of their own nation and homeland. [...] It needs to be formed to overcome the inertia of thinking and acting from the older people, even though they are considered to be more experienced in the political field,"

— Catatan B.M. Diah: Peran “Pivotal” Pemuda Seputar Lahirnya Proklamasi 17-8-’45 (2019; XXVIII)

Following the end of World War II, after the surrender of Japan, the Asia Raya newspaper was closed. He, together with a number of colleagues, such as Joesoef Isak and Rosihan Anwar, took up arms and seized the "Djawa Shimbun" printing press, a Japanese printing press which previously published Asia Raya. On 1 October 1945, he founded the Harian Merdeka. Burhanuddin became the editor-in-chief, while Joesoef Isak became his deputy, and Rosihan Anwar became the editor. Later, Joesoef Isak, a Sukarnoist, had to be dismissed at the insistence of the New Order government, while Rosihan Anwar eventually founded his own newspaper the "Harian Pedoman."

==== Proclamation of Independence ====
Burhanuddin was also present during the writing of the Proclamation of Independence, in the house of Japanese admiral Tadashi Maeda, where Sukarno, Hatta, and Achmad Soebardjo drafted the text of the proclamation. After the draft was approved members of the Preparatory Committee for Indonesian Independence (PPKI) who were present, Sukarno asked Sayuti Melik to type it. Burhanuddin accompanied Sayuti Melik while he typed. After the typed text was signed by Sukarno and Hatta, Sayuti simply threw away the draft. At the time, few cared of Sukarno's original handwritten draft, as there was already the official typewriter written one, already signed by both Sukarno and Hatta. However, Burhanuddin took it from the trash can. He would keep the draft with him for years, until he handed it over to president Suharto in 1993.

"My instinct as a journalist took it to be announced in newspapers,"

— Kompas (20/5/1992)

==== Post-independence career ====
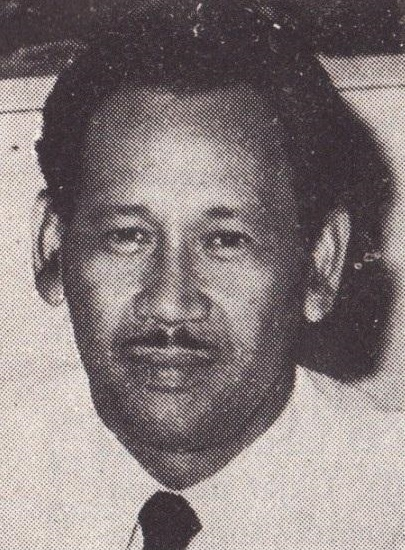
Portrait of B.M. Diah, c. 1960s

After Indonesia's independence, Burhanuddin continued his work in journalism. He was a fierce nationalist, and Sukarnoist, who disagreed with the military during the 17 October affair, moved from place to place to avoid being chased by military officers. In 1959, he was appointed ambassador to Czechoslovakia and Hungary. From there he was transferred to the United Kingdom, then to Thailand. In 1968, he was appointed by President Suharto to become the Minister of Information. Later he was appointed a member of the People's Representative Council and then a member of the Supreme Advisory Council.

When the New Order government decided to change the Indonesian name of China, from "Tiongkok" to "Cina" and "Republik Rakyat Tiongkok" to "Republik Rakyat Cina," Burhanuddin's newspaper, "Harian Merdeka" and another newspaper known as "Indonesia Raya" was recognized as the only press that persisted in maintaining the terms "Tiongkok" and the alternative spelling of "Tiongha." In his old age, Burhanuddin founded a hotel in Jakarta, the Hyatt Aryaduta, in what was once the home of his wife's parents. The last positions he served in prior to his death were positions of President Director of PT Masa Merdeka, and Deputy Leader of PT Hotel Prapatan-Jakarta.

In 1987, he interviewed Soviet leader Mikhail Gorbachev.

=== Death and legacy ===
Burhanuddin Mohammad Diah died at age 79, in the morning hours of 10 June 1996, in the capital city of Jakarta. He was initially treated at Siloam Gleneagles Hospital, Tangerang, on 25 April, before being transferred to the Jakarta Hospital. He died due to stroke and liver failure, which he had struggled with for some time prior, he also had a history of troubles with his lungs as well as possibly diabetes. His death was mourned by the then-president Suharto, then-vice president Try Sutrisno, as well as by the ministers in the sixth Development Cabinet, and the former ministers in the previous cabinets. Other national figures appeared, including Harmoko, Emil Salim, Sutiyoso, as well as a number of Burhanuddin's friends, including Ruslan Abdulgani, Soebadio Sastrosatomo, Mochtar Lubis, and Supeni. His body was interred at the Kalibata Heroes' Cemetery in a military ceremony, with Harmoko acting as the ceremonial inspector.

== Awards ==
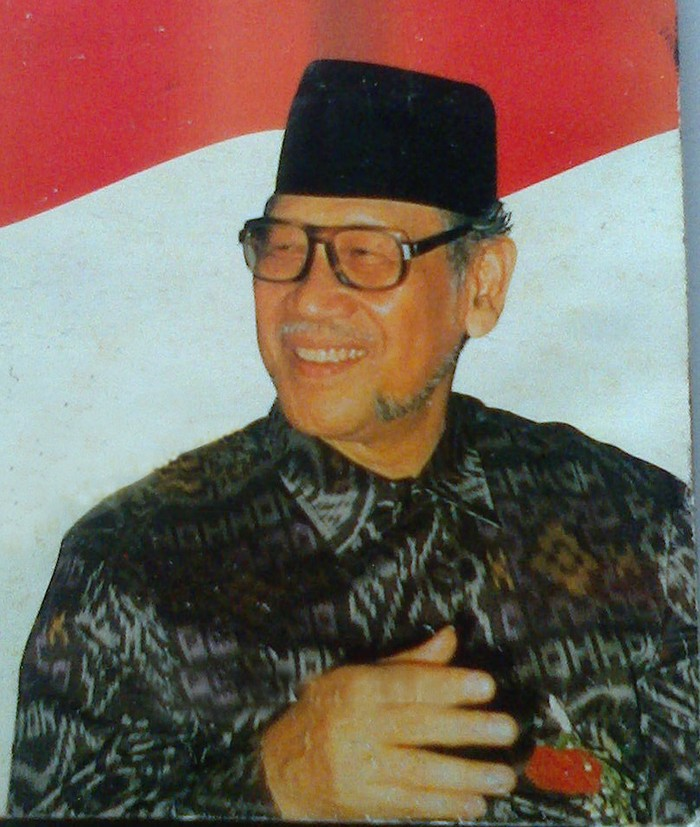
B.M. Diah (old), from the cover of Butir-butir padi B.M. Diah (tokoh sejarah yang menghayati zaman)

For his struggles and services, he was awarded the following awards:

- Bintang Mahaputra Utama from President Suharto (10 May 1978).
- Award certificate and Medal of Struggle Level '45 from the National Daily Council (17 August 1995).

== Personal life ==
While working at Radio Hosokyoku, he met Herawati Diah, a broadcaster who graduated from journalism and sociology in the United States. They dated, and soon after, on 18 August 1942 they were married. Their wedding party was attended by future-president Sukarno and future-vice president Mohammad Hatta. Together, they had two daughters and one son; Nurdi Diah, Adiniawati Diah and Nurman Diah (the father in-law of actress Shelomita Diah).

== See also ==
- Herawati Diah, his first wife.

Diplomatic posts
Preceded by Soenario	Ambassador of Indonesia to the United Kingdom; 1964–1966	Succeeded by Soerjodipoero
Preceded by Position established	Ambassador of Indonesia to Hungary; 1959–1962	Succeeded by Sarino Mangunpranoto (officially)
Preceded by Position established	Ambassador of Indonesia to Czechoslovakia; 1959–1962	Succeeded by Armunanto
