= Juwono Sudarsono =

Indonesian politician (1942–2026)

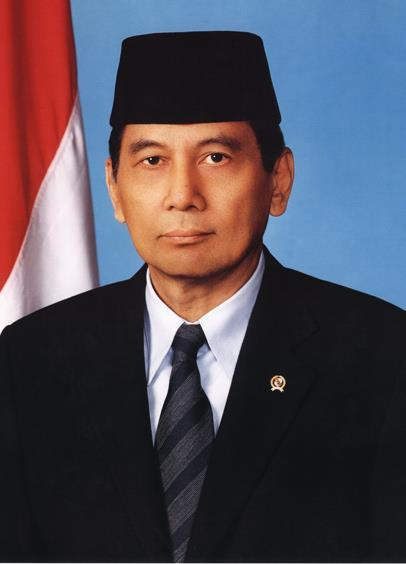
- Official portrait, 2008

16th Ambassador of Indonesia to the United Kingdom
- In office 2003–2004
- President: Megawati Soekarnoputri
- Preceded by: Nana Sutresna
- Succeeded by: Marty Natalegawa

20th Minister of Defense
- In office 21 October 2004 – 20 October 2009
- President: Susilo Bambang Yudhoyono
- Preceded by: Matori Abdul Djalil
- Succeeded by: Purnomo Yusgiantoro
- In office 29 October 1999 – 26 August 2000
- President: Abdurrahman Wahid
- Preceded by: Wiranto
- Succeeded by: Mahfud MD

22nd Minister of Education and Culture
- In office 23 May 1998 – 20 October 1999
- President: B. J. Habibie
- Preceded by: Wiranto Arismunandar
- Succeeded by: Yahya Muhaimin

3rd State Minister of Environment
- In office 17 March 1998 – 21 May 1998
- President: Suharto
- Preceded by: Sarwono Kusumaatmadja
- Succeeded by: Panangian Siregar

Personal details
- Born: 5 March 1942 Ciamis, Preanger Regencies Residency, Japanese-occupied Dutch East Indies
- Died: 28 March 2026 (aged 84) Jakarta, Indonesia
- Party: Independent
- Children: 2
- Education: University of Indonesia; University of California, Berkeley; London School of Economics and Political Science
- Occupation: Politician; Diplomat

Juwono Sudarsono (5 March 1942 – 28 March 2026) was an Indonesian diplomat and the author of works on political science and international relations. He was educated at the University of Indonesia, Jakarta (B.A., M.S.); The Institute of Social Studies, The Hague, the Netherlands; the University of California, Berkeley, USA (M.A.); and the London School of Economics, UK (Ph.D.). He was later an Emeritus Professor at the University of Indonesia.

== Life and career ==
Juwono Sudarsono was the son of Sudarsono Mangunadikusumo, who was Minister of Home Affairs and Minister for Social Affairs in the late 1940s in the Second Sjahrir Cabinet. He served as head of the Department of International Relations and Dean of the Faculty of Social and Political Sciences, University of Indonesia (1985–1994) and taught at The School of Public and International Affairs, Columbia University, New York City in 1986–87.

In public service, Sudarsono served as Vice Governor of The National Defence College (Lemhannas), 1995–1998; Minister of State for the Environment under President Suharto, 1998; Minister of Education and Culture under President B.J. Habibie, 1998–1999; Minister of Defence under President Abdurrahman Wahid (the first civilian to occupy this position in 50 years), 1999–2000; Ambassador to the United Kingdom under President Megawati Sukarnoputri, 2003–2004; and Minister for Defence under President Susilo Bambang Yudhoyono, 2004–2009.

== Death ==
Sudarsono died at Pondok Indah Hospital in South Jakarta, on 28 March 2026, at the age of 84.

Political offices
Preceded by Sarwono Kusumaatmadja	State Minister of Environment; 1998–1998	Succeeded by Panangian Siregar
Preceded by Wiranto Arismunandar	Minister of Education and Culture; 1998–1999	Succeeded by Yahya Muhaimin
Preceded by Wiranto	Minister of Defense; 1999–2000	Succeeded by Mahfud MD
Preceded by Matori Abdul Djalil	Minister of Defense; 2004–2009	Succeeded by Purnomo Yusgiantoro
Diplomatic posts
Preceded by Nana Sutresna	Ambassador of Indonesia to the United Kingdom; 2003–2004	Succeeded by Marty Natalegawa
