= Soenario =

Indonesian politician and diplomat (1902–1997)

Mr. Soenario
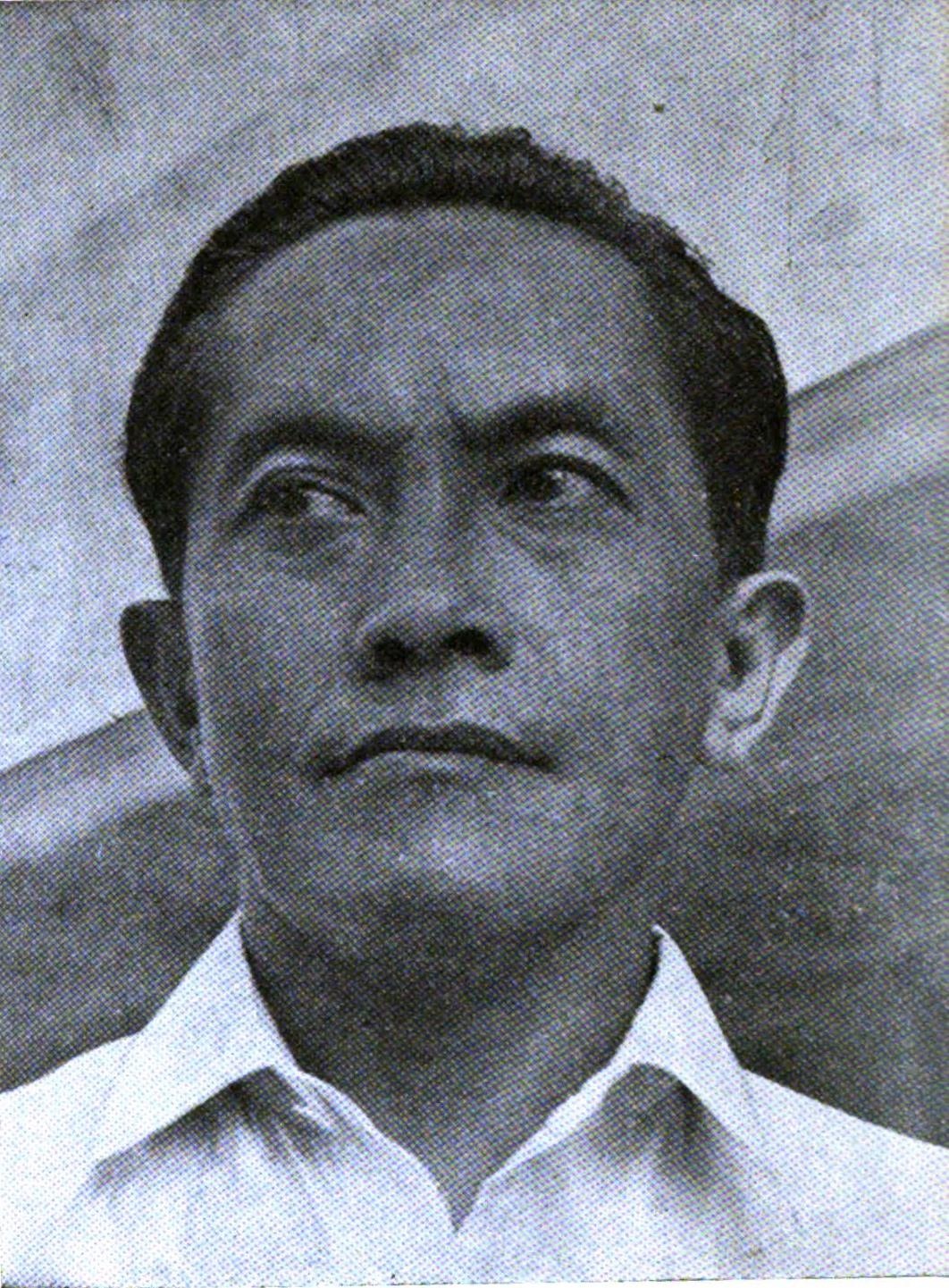
- Official portrait, c. 1954

7th Minister of Foreign Affairs
- In office 1 August 1953 – 24 July 1955
- Prime Minister: Ali Sastroamidjojo
- Preceded by: Moekarto Notowidigdo
- Succeeded by: Ide Anak Agoeng Gde Agoeng

3rd Indonesian Ambassador to the United Kingdom
- In office 1956–1961
- Preceded by: Soepomo
- Succeeded by: B.M. Diah

Other positions
- 1960–1972: Rector of the Syarif Hidayatullah State Islamic University Jakarta
- 1960–1963: Rector of the Sunan Kalijaga State Islamic University

Personal details
- Born: 28 August 1902 Madiun, Dutch East Indies
- Died: 18 May 1997 (aged 94) Jakarta, Indonesia
- Party: Indonesian National Party
- Spouse: Dina Maranta Pantauw (m. 1930; died 1994)
- Children: Sunaryati Hartono, Astrid Susanto, Sunardien, Wuryastuti Sunario, and Irawan Sunario
- Relatives: Dian Sastrowardoyo (Grandniece)
- Profession: Politician; diplomat

Soenario Sastrowardoyo (EYD: Sunario Sastrowardoyo; 28 August 1902 – 18 May 1997), more commonly known simply as Soenario, was an Indonesian politician, and diplomat, who served as the 7th Foreign Minister of Indonesia, from 1953 until 1955, during the First Ali Sastroamidjojo cabinet, under Prime Minister Ali Sastroamidjojo. He was one of Indonesia's leading figures during the Indonesian independence movement and served as an administrator for the Perhimpoenan Indonesia association in the Netherlands.

He was born in Madiun, East Java, Indonesia, on 28 August 1902. He started his education at the Frobelschool, before continuing to Europeesche Lagere School (ELS) and later to the Meer Uitgebreid Lager Onderwijs (MULO). He then continued to the Rechtshoogeschool in Batavia and later the Leiden University in Leiden. While studying in the Netherlands, he was active in the management of the Perhimpoenan Indonesia association.

Upon his return from the Netherlands, he began practicing as a lawyer, and assisted in the Indonesian independence movement. After the Declaration of Independence of Indonesia, he was a member of the Central Indonesian National Committee (KNIP). Following the end of the Indonesian Revolution, he continued to serve in government. He served as Minister of Foreign Affairs of Indonesia from 1 August 1953 until 12 August 1955, and as Ambassador to the United Kingdom from 1956 until 1961. He later became a Professor in political science and International Law at Diponegoro University. He died on 18 May 1997 in Jakarta.

== Biography ==
=== Early life and education ===
Soenario Sastrowardoyo was born in Madiun, East Java, Indonesia, on 28 August 1902. He was the eldest son, and the first of 14 children, of Raden Mas Sutejo Sastrowardoyo, a wedono of the Uteran District in Madiun, and Raden Ayu Ratna Suyati Sastrowardoyo (née Kartokusumo). In 1908, he entered the Frobelschool, the equivalent of kindergarten, in Madiun. At the school, he was taught by two teachers named Acherbeek and Tien. After he graduated from the Frobelschool, he entered into Europeesche Lagere School (ELS), a European elementary school system during colonial rule. There, he lived in the house of his grandfather, Sastrosentono.

After completing his education at ELS, he continued his education at the Meer Uitgebreid Lager Onderwijs (MULO), the equivalent of Junior High School during colonial rule. He only attended for a year, before transferring to the Rechtshoogeschool in Batavia, the equivalent of Vocational High School. At Rechtshoogeschool, he lived at the house of his uncles, named Kusman and Kunto, studied both the French language and law, and became a member of the Jong Java association.

After he finished his education at the Rechtshoogeschool, he continued his studies in the Netherlands. Going there by boat to Genoa, then continued his journey by train to Brussels, Belgium (staying there overnight), before going to The Hague and changing trains to Leiden. In Leiden, he was accepted into the University of Leiden, studying at the Faculty of Law. During his time in Leiden, he was active in the management of the Perhimpoenan Indonesia association and was elected as secretary. Together with his colleagues there, Sunario formulated the outline of the association's direction which became known as the 1925 Political Manifesto. He received his diploma from Leiden on 15 December 1925, which was signed by Professors Cornelis van Vollenhoven and Nicolaas Johannes Krom.

=== Political career ===
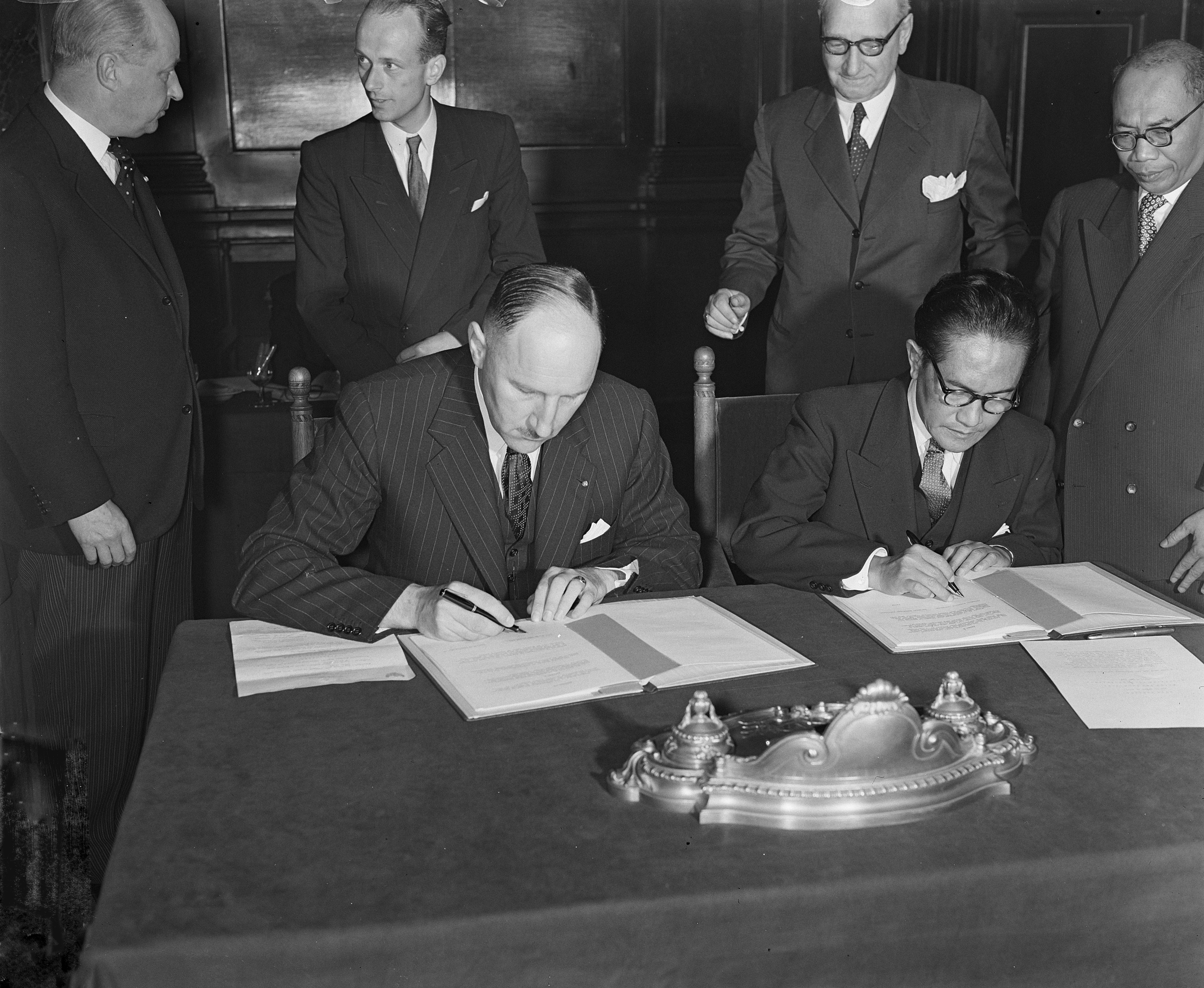
Soenario as Minister of Foreign Affairs, with Joseph Luns (1954)

Upon his return from the Netherlands in July 1926, Sunario led the scouting of the Nationale Padvinders Organisatie (NPO). He established a private law practice in Bandung, while becoming active in Sukarno's Perserikatan Nasional Indonesia, later renamed to the Partai Nasional Indonesia (Indonesian National Party). Together with his friends, he also assisted in the establishing of the Jong Indonesia association on 20 February 1927, which would change its name to Pemuda Indonesia in December 1927. Pemuda Indonesia together with Indonesian Student Associations (PPPI) pioneered the holding of the Second Youth Congress in Jakarta. In the Second Youth Congress on 28 October 1928, Sunario became a speaker. As a continuation of the Youth Pledge, Sunario founded the People's College on 11 December 1929.

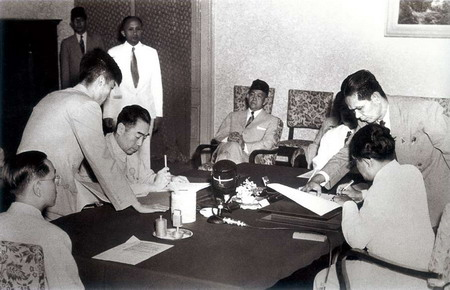
Zhou Enlai and Soenario signing the treaty on dual citizenship

Sunario became a member of the Central Indonesian National Committee (KNIP), the Government body appointed to assist the president of Indonesia, following the proclamation of Independence. After Indonesia's independence was recognized by the Dutch, following a violent 4 year-conflict, he served as Minister of Foreign Affairs from 1 August 1953 until 24 July 1955, during the First Ali Sastroamidjojo cabinet, under Prime Minister Ali Sastroamidjojo. During his tenure as Minister of Foreign Affairs, Sunario served as Head of the Indonesian Delegation at the Asian-African Conference in Bandung in 1955. He also signed the Agreement on Dual Chinese Citizenship with Chinese diplomat Zhou Enlai. Following the end of the cabinet, he served as the Indonesian ambassador to the United Kingdom, from 1956 until 1961.

=== Later career and death ===
After the end of his ambassadorship, Sunario became a professor of international politics and law at Diponegoro University, before becoming the rector there. He also became the rectors of a number of other universities, including rector of the Sunan Kalijaga University of Yogyakarta, and the Syarif Hidayatullah University of Jakarta. In 1968, Sunario took the initiative to gather the historical actors of the Youth Pledge, and asked the Governor Ali Sadikin of Jakarta to manage and restore the original building located on Kramat Raya 106 street, though the place had changed tenants and owners. The place was eventually agreed to be the Youth Pledge Museum, but the proposal to change the name of the street from Jalan Kramat Raya to Jalan Sumpah Pemuda has not been achieved.

After retiring, he was appointed to the Committee of Five in 1974. The committee was formed by the government due to uproar among the people about who was actually the creator of Pancasila. The committee was chaired by former Vice President Mohammad Hatta. Other members include Ahmad Subardjo, Alexander Andries Maramis, and Abdoel Gaffar Pringgodigdo, all figures who helped formulate the 1945 Jakarta Charter. Sunario passed away in Jakarta on 18 May 1997, in Medistra hospital. He was buried in the Kalibata Heroes' Cemetery. Then-President Suharto spoke at his funeral in 1997. In 2002, the hundredth anniversary of his birth was commemorated at the Ministry of Foreign Affairs in Jakarta.

== Personal life ==
=== Family ===
==== Ancestors ====
Soenario was the eldest son, and the first of 14 children, of Raden Mas Sutejo Sastrowardoyo, a wedono of the Uteran District in Madiun, and Raden Ayu Ratna Suyati Sastrowardoyo. His grandfather was Sastrosentono. His father traced the family's ancestry back to 15th century Java. The family name was derived from sastra (Sanskrit, 'writings') and wardaya (Sanskrit, 'heart'), so literally meant "writings of the heart".

==== Siblings ====
As stated previously, he had 13 younger siblings. Sunarjo Sastrowardoyo, was an elementary school teacher, Sukanti Suryochondro, who was an instructor in women's studies at the University of Indonesia, Subekti Sastrowardojo, who died in infancy during the 1918 influenza pandemic, Suryono Sastrowardoyo, who was a career diplomat whose posts included Singapore, Italy, the United States and Poland, Sumarsono Sastrowardoyo, who was a physician, surgeon and memoirist, Subagio Sastrowardoyo, who was a noted poet and academic, and Sumarsongko Sastrowardoyo, who was a member of staff of the Consulate General of Indonesia in New York City.

==== Descendants ====
He was married to Dina Maranta Pantauw, a Minahasa Protestant, whom he met during the 1928 Youth Congress, who was the delegate from Manado. He married her on 7 July 1930. She died in 1994. Together, they had 5 children. Sunaryati Hartono, who is an attorney, lawyer, and professor of law, Astrid Susanto, who was a politician who served in the People's Representative Council, Sunardine, who was an economist, Wuryastuti Sunario, who was managing director of the Indonesian Tourism Promotion Board, Irawan Sunario, who was the founder of Citibank Indonesia. His granddaughter, Maya Sunario, is an active member of the Indonesian Irish Association since 2003 and is the current Chairperson.

==== Other relatives ====
He is the first cousin, once removed, of Nugroho Wisnumurti, who was Indonesia's Permanent Representative to the United Nations and Other International Organizations in Geneva, Switzerland from 2000 until 2004. He also has two nephews, Rahadyan Sastrowardoyo, and Hartriono B. Sastrowardoyo, both being US-based journalists (the latter for The Asbury Park Press).

Diplomatic posts
Preceded by Soepomo	Ambassador of Indonesia to the United Kingdom; 1956–1961	Succeeded by B.M. Diah
