= Yuri Octavian Thamrin =

Indonesian diplomat (born 1961)

Ambassador of Indonesia to Belgium, Luxembourg, and the European Union
- In office 13 January 2016 – 2020
- President: Joko Widodo
- Preceded by: Arif Havas Oegroseno
- Succeeded by: Andri Hadi

Director General for Asia, Pacific, and Africa
- In office 21 December 2011 – 13 May 2016
- Preceded by: Hamzah Thayeb
- Succeeded by: Desra Percaya

Ambassador to the United Kingdom, Ireland, and IMO
- In office 8 April 2008 – 21 Desember 2011
- President: Susilo Bambang Yudhoyono
- Preceded by: Marty Natalegawa
- Succeeded by: Hamzah Thayeb

Chief of Staff to the Foreign Minister
- In office 6 April 2004 – 28 December 2005
- Preceded by: Marty Natalegawa
- Succeeded by: Desra Percaya

Personal details
- Born: October 31, 1961 (age 65) Jambi, Indonesia
- Spouse: Risandrani Suyoso
- Children: 2
- Education: University of Indonesia (Drs.); Australian National University (MA)

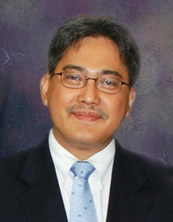
Yuri Octavian Thamrin

Yuri Octavian Thamrin (born 31 October 1961) is a retired Indonesian diplomat who has served as ambassador to Belgium, Luxembourg, and the European Union from 2016 to 2020 and ambassador to the United Kingdom, concurrently accredited to Ireland and the International Maritime Organization, from 2008 to 2011. He also served in a number of positions in the foreign ministry, including as director general for Asia, Pacific, and Africa from 2012 to 2016 and spokesperson of the foreign ministry from 2004 to 2008.

== Early life and education ==
Born in Jambi on 31 October 1961, Yuri Octavian Thamrin is the son of Thamrin Manan, a law expert, lawyer, politician, and former Head of the Jambi district court, and Siti Soendari. He completed his undergraduate education in international relations at the University of Indonesia in 1986. He later continued his master's education in the same major at the Australian National University and graduated in 1999.

== Diplomatic career ==
Yuri began his dipplomatic career in 1987 and completed basic diplomatic education a year later. In 1989, he became a fellow at the United Nations Institute for Disarmament Research (UNIDIR), where he authored a research report titled Southeast Asian Nuclear Weapons Free Zone: Problems and Prospect. His early roles included serving as the acting chief of section of law of the sea politics, Nusantara outlook, and outer space in 1990 and completing a consular course in 1991. He was assigned as Political Staff at the Indonesian Permanent Mission in Geneva, Switzerland, from 1992 to 1995, during which time he also represented Indonesia as a delegate in the Conference on Disarmament (1989-1995). He also served as an Expert for the United Nations Fellowship on Disarmament in 1995.

Upon returning to the ministry, he was appointed Head of the Security Council Section in the Directorate of International Organizations in 1996. He completed his mid-level diplomatic training in 1999, and by the same year was appointed as the spokesperson for the Indonesian Task Force for Post Popular Consultation of East Timor in East Timor. He was then posted to the Indonesian Permanent Mission to the United Nations in New York, United States, serving as the Head of the Sub-Directorate for Disarmament and Security Council from 2000 to 2002, and subsequently as the Head of Political Division I from 2002 to 2003. During his time in New York (2000-2003), he represented Indonesia in numerous international security and arms control forums and was a delegate to the UN General Assembly (2000-2005). He was highly active in multilateral negotiations, serving as a member of the UN Group of Studies on missile issues in 2001 and 2002, and as the Coordinator for the NAM Working Group on Disarmament from 2002 to 2003, acting as the NAM spokesperson in various disarmament negotiations including the NPT, BWC, and Small Arms. He also held positions as the ASEAN Coordinator for Terrorism issues in 2003 and Vice Chair of the Ad Hoc Committee on the Indian Ocean from 2002 to 2003.

Returning to Jakarta, Yuri completed his senior diplomatic education in 2004. He was appointed Head of the Minister's Administration Bureau and Spokesperson II for the Ministry of Foreign Affairs from May 2004 to December 2005. He was then promoted to Director of East Asia and Pacific, also serving as Spokesperson I, beginning in December 2005. On 28 December 2005, Yuri became the director for East Asia and Pacific affairs in the foreign ministry. In 2008, he received his first ambassadorial appointment to the United Kingdom, Ireland, and the IMO, holding the post until 2011 when he was succeeded by Hamzah Thayeb. Following this, he represented Indonesia as the APEC Senior Officials' Meeting (SOM) Leader when President Susilo Bambang Yudhoyono chaired APEC in 2013. He also played an important role as the SOM chair preparing the substantive elements for the 60th Asian-African Conference Summit, chaired by President Joko Widodo in April 2015. As Director General of Asia Pacific and Africa, he led the Indian Ocean Rim Association (IORA) SOM process in Padang in October 2015, which successfully endorsed the first IORA Summit and led to the adoption of The Jakarta Concord in 2016.

In 2016, President Joko Widodo appointed Yuri as ambassador to Belgium, Luxembourg, and the European Union from 2016 to 2020. During this assignment, he applied the President's directive for diplomats to act as "marketers," emphasizing economic diplomacy with benefits for the Indonesian people, and viewed the COVID-19 pandemic as an opportunity to advance national interests. He focused on promoting trade, tourism, investment, and educational cooperation, while also addressing key issues such as the environment, climate change, human rights, democracy, health, fisheries, disaster relief, and poverty alleviation. A significant achievement during his time in Brussels was the establishment of the Indonesian Interfaith Scholarship, a six-year program for European officials, researchers, journalists, and students regarding peaceful and inclusive Islam, which produced 52 alumni. After completing his service in 2020, he expressed a desire to continue his work in international relations.

== Personal life ==
He is married to Risandrani, also referred to as Sandra Yuri, and they have two sons, Rian and Adrian, and three grandchildren.
