= Herawati Diah =

Indonesian journalist (1917–2016)

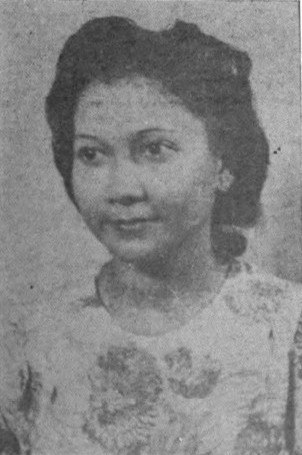
- Herawati Diah in 1947
- Born: Siti Latifah Herawati Diah; 3 April 1917; Tanjung Pandan, Belitung, Dutch East Indies
- Died: 30 September 2016 (aged 99); Jakarta, Indonesia
- Occupation: journalist
- Notable credit(s): founder, Indonesian Observer newspaper, Yayasan Binacarita Indonesia (foundation for education)
- Spouse: B.M. Diah
- Children: three

Siti Latifah Herawati Diah (3 April 1917 – 30 September 2016) was an Indonesian journalist.

Herawati Diah graduated from Barnard College in 1941, the first Indonesian woman to graduate from a university in the United States. In 1955, she and her husband B.M. Diah founded The Indonesian Observer.

Herawati died in September 2016 at the age of 99.

== Family ==
She had three children; two daughters and one son.

== Bibliography ==
- An Endless Journey: Reflections of an Indonesian Journalist. PT Equinox Publishing, 2005. ISBN 979-3780-06-1
