= Desra Percaya =

Indonesian diplomat (born 1961)

His Excellency Desra Percaya
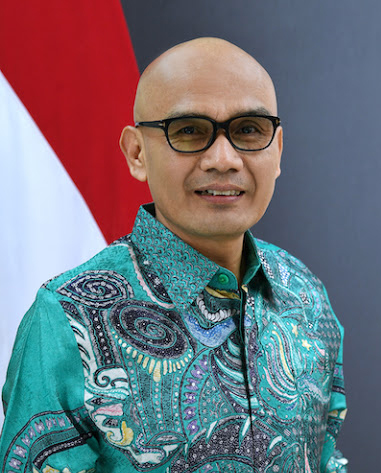
- Desra Percaya as Ambassador of Indonesia to the UK

21st Ambassador of Indonesia to the United Kingdom
- Incumbent
- Assumed office 26 October 2020
- President: Joko Widodo
- Preceded by: Rizal Sukma

Director-General for Asia Pacific and Africa
- In office 13 May 2016 – 27 October 2020
- Minister: Retno Marsudi
- Preceded by: Yuri Octavian Thamrin
- Succeeded by: Abdul Kadir Jailani

Chief of Staff to the Foreign Minister
- In office 28 December 2005 – 5 January 2007
- Preceded by: Yuri Octavian Thamrin
- Succeeded by: Kristiarto Legowo

Personal details
- Born: 20 April 1961 (age 65) Malang, East Java, Indonesia
- Spouse: Diana Mawarsari
- Children: Asteya Prima Percaya; Muhammad Dwi Aditya Percaya
- Education: Airlangga University (S.Sos.); University of Birmingham (MA); Graduate Society, Durham (Ph.D)
- Profession: Diplomat

Desra Percaya (born 20 April 1961) is an Indonesian diplomat who, since 2020, serves as Ambassador Extraordinary and Plenipotentiary of the Republic of Indonesia to the United Kingdom, accredited to Ireland and the International Maritime Organization.

== Education ==
Percaya read social studies at Airlangga University, Surabaya, Indonesia, graduating with a bachelor's degree, before pursuing further studies in international relations at the University of Birmingham, where he received his MA in 1995. He then enrolled onto the Graduate Society (now Ustinov College) at Durham University, where he completed his PhD, with a thesis entitled "Sino-Indonesian Relations: A Study of Indonesian Perceptions of China" in 2000.

He was awarded the honorary degree of Doctor of the University (DUniv) by the University of Birmingham in 2014; and again in 2024 by Durham University.

== Career ==
Percaya was appointed ambassador and permanent representative of the Republic of Indonesia to the United Nations in New York in February 2012. He was elected chairman of the United Nations' First Committee (Disarmament and International Security) on 4 September 2013, also serving as vice-president of the Economic and Social Council (ECOSOC), co-facilitator on human rights treaty bodies, chairman of the NAM Working Group on Disarmament, vice-chairman of the UN Committee on the Inalienable Rights of the Palestinian People, and vice-chairman of the UN Committee on Decolonization.

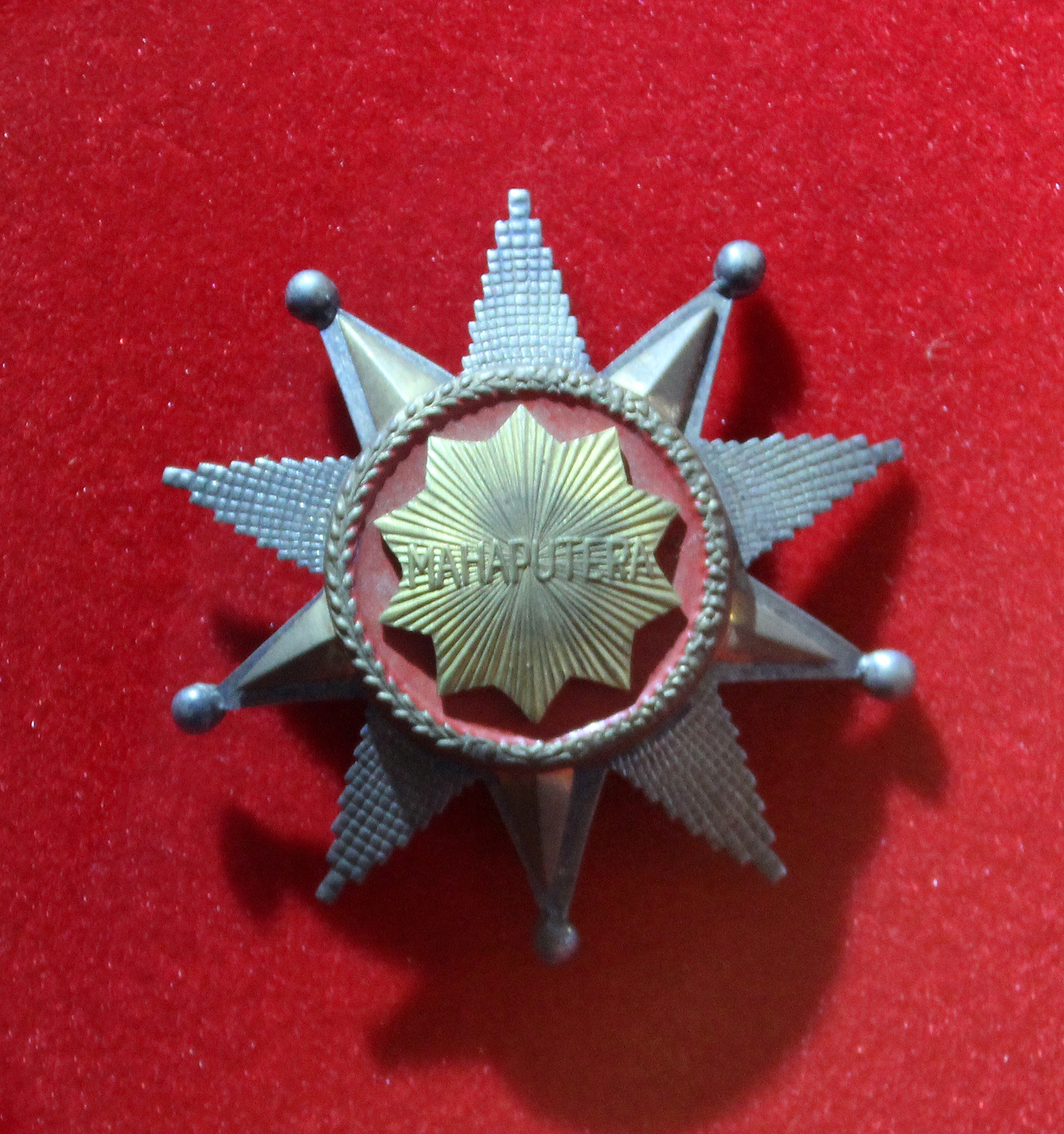
Bintang Mahaputera

Percaya served as Director-General for Asia, Pacific, and Africa at the Indonesian Ministry of Foreign Affairs, and was previously Indonesia's Deputy Permanent Representative to the UN in Geneva, Switzerland. Before this he was Director of International Security and Disarmament in the Directorate of Multilateral Affairs in Jakarta between 2007 and 2009. He first joined Indonesia's Ministry of Foreign Affairs in 1986.

== Personal life ==
Born in East Java on 20 April 1961 of Sundanese parentage, Percaya is married and has two children: Asteya Prima and Muhammad Dwi Aditya Percaya.

== Honours and awards ==
- Bintang Mahaputera (Indonesia)
- Officier dans l'ordre de la Couronne (Belgium)
- Hon DUniv (University of Birmingham)
- Hon DUniv (Durham University)

Diplomatic posts
| Preceded by Rizal Sukma | Ambassador of Indonesia to the United Kingdom; 2020 – | Succeeded by in office |
