= Astrid Susanto =

Indonesian politician

Maria Antonia Astrid Sunarti Susanto (also known as Astrid Susanto-Sunario) -- deputy chairwoman of Commission I of the Indonesian legislature, the People's Representative Council—was born 4 January 1936 in Makassar, South Celebes (now South Sulawesi), Dutch East Indies (now Indonesia) and died on 13 April 2006 in Jakarta. She was also a professor in the Department of International Relations at the University of Indonesia.

Susanto received her M.Phil. at the University of Münster, then-West Germany, in 1960 and a Ph.D. in Mass Communications at the Free University of Berlin in 1964.

== Career ==
- Dean of the publication faculty, Padjajaran University, Bandung (1971–1975)
- Adjunct Professor, Communications and Developmental Sociology, University of Indonesia (1976–2006)
- Head of the Bureau of the Study of Cultures in the Ministry of National Development (1974–1983)
- Assistant Minister in the Ministry of Development (1983–1988)
- Member, People's Consultative Assembly from Utusan Golongan (1987–1992)
- Member, PDKB DPR/MPR faction (2002)
- Member, Kesatuan Bangsa Kebangsaan Indonesia (F-KKI) faction (2002–2004)
- Adjunct Professor, in the post graduate program (S-2 dan S-3) - University of Indonesia, Jakarta; Sahid University, Jakarta; and Hasannudin University, Makassar

== Family ==
Susanto was the second daughter of Soenario, S.H. (1902–1997), a former Indonesian minister of foreign affairs, and Dina Maria Geraldine Maranta (née Pantouw) Soenario (?-1995). Her husband was Ir. Bambang Susanto. She had two sons and one daughtern.

Susanto's older sister is Sunaryati Hartono, vice-chairman of the National Ombudsman Commission of Indonesia.

== Bibliography ==
- The Mass Communication System in Indonesia (1974) ASIN B0006XEDWM
- (With Simeon Itlay, Benny Hilapok, Nico Aso-Iokobal, Herman Peters and Frans Lieshout) Kebudayaan Jayawijaya dalam pembangunan bangsa (Culture of Kabupaten Jayawijaya with modernization process and traditional value system; papers of a seminar) (1993) ISBN 979-416-254-X
- Pembangunan masyarakat pedesaan: Suatu telaah analitis masyarakat Wamena, Irian Jaya (Study on socio-culture of Dani and Baliem ethnic groups in the context of rural community development in Wamena, Irian Jaya Province) (1994) ISBN 979-416-268-X
- Masyarakat Indonesia memasuki abad ke dua puluh satu (Social, political, and cultural conditions of Indonesia in the 21st century) (1999) ISBN 979-8439-02-3
