= Indonesia–United Kingdom relations =

Bilateral relations

- Indonesia: United Kingdom

Diplomatic mission
- Embassy of Indonesia, London: Embassy of the United Kingdom, Jakarta

Indonesia and the United Kingdom established diplomatic relations on 19 December 1949 and have maintained strong relations since then. Indonesia has an embassy in London while the United Kingdom has an embassy in Jakarta. The United Kingdom considers Indonesia an increasingly important partner globally and is committed to efforts to take bilateral relations to new heights.

Both countries share common membership of the G20, and the World Trade Organization. Bilaterally the two countries have a Development Partnership, a Double Taxation Agreement, an Investment Agreement, and a Strategic Partnership.

According to a 2013 BBC World Service Poll, 65% of Indonesians view the United Kingdom's influence positively, with only 15% expressing a negative view, which makes Indonesia the country with the second most favourable perception of the United Kingdom in Asia after South Korea.

== History ==
=== Before Indonesian Independence ===
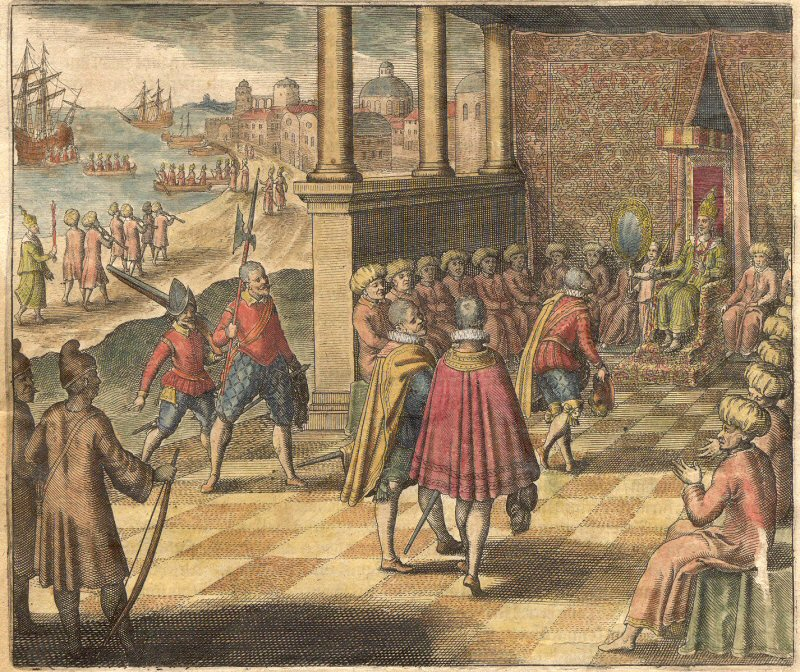
Francis Drake's visit to Sultan Babullah in 1579. Illustration by Theodor de Bry.

English sailors first reached what is now Indonesia in the 16th century, when Sir Francis Drake reached Moluccas in 1579 on his circum-globe journey. The British East India Company opened a trading post in Bantam on the first voyage in 1601 and imports of pepper from Java were an important part of the company's trade for twenty years. However, because of heavy competition with the Dutch East India Company, the British trade post in Bantam was closed in 1683. The British shifted their attention to the Indian subcontinent while the Dutch began to establish themselves more firmly in Java and later expanded to most of the Indonesian archipelago.

The British established their garrison at Bencoolen in 1685 and in 1714 built Fort Marlborough in the city. They also established a trading post in Riau, others in the region being the Strait Settlements in Penang and Singapore, while the Dutch wrestled the port of Malacca from the Portuguese in 1641. During the Napoleonic Wars in Europe, the Kingdom of Holland and its colonies in the East Indies fell to the French Republic. The British launched a military campaign against Dutch and French hold in Java and established British rule in Java. From 1811 to 1815, Indonesia was administrated by the British. Stamford Raffles served as the Governor of the East Indies from 1811 to 1816. He was an enthusiast of Javanese culture and history that during his administration he led expeditions that discovered Borobudur, Trowulan and other archaeological sites in Java, subsequently writing The History of Java and publishing it in 1817. Hester Needham (1843–1897), was a British women missionary who was sent by the Rhenish Missionary Society to the North Sumatra, namely in Sibolga, Silindung, and Mandailing Natal. Hester Needham spent the last 7 years of her life as a missionary in the Batak lands from 8 January 1890 to 12 May 1897.

The British and the Dutch signed the Anglo-Dutch Treaty of 1824 which defined the boundary of British and Dutch realms in Southeast Asia and India. The boundaries were later inherited by modern Brunei, Indonesia, Malaysia, and Singapore. The name "Indonesia" was first coined in 1850, when George Windsor Earl, the British ethnologist, proposed the terms Indunesians — and, his preference, Malayunesians — for the inhabitants of the "Indian Archipelago or Malayan Archipelago". In the same publication, a student of Earl's, James Richardson Logan, used Indonesia as a synonym for the Indian Archipelago.

=== After Indonesian Independence ===
The British ruled the Malay Peninsula (British Malaya) and Northern Borneo, while the Dutch controlled Java, Sumatra, and most of the Indonesian archipelago until the Japanese invasion in 1942. During the aftermath of World War II, the Allied Forces led by the British were involved in warfare with Republican Indonesian soldiers and militia during the Battle of Surabaya in 1945. The Indian troops successfully conquered Surabaya on behalf of the Netherlands, but faced some fierce resistance from Indonesian troops and militias.

Again in 1962 the British army and the Indonesian Armed Forces were locked in undeclared warfare in Northern Borneo (Sabah and Sarawak) during the Indonesia–Malaysia confrontation. The Indonesian Sukarno administration was against the British decolonisation initiative on the formation of Malaysia, the amalgamation of the Federation of Malaya (now West Malaysia), Singapore and the crown colony, British protectorates of Sabah and Sarawak (collectively known as British Borneo, now East Malaysia). The British assisted the Malaysian armed forces against Indonesian campaigns and operations on Northern Borneo. With the fall of Sukarno and plagued with internal problems, Indonesia lost their intention to continue the fight and the hostilities ceased. Indonesia finally agreed to the formation of the Malaysian Federation.

After the turbulent years of the 1960s, relations between Indonesia and the United Kingdom have been improving ever since. Because of the importance of English as an international language, the Indonesian government has been promoting the education of English as the most important foreign language taught in Indonesian schools since the 1970s. The British Council was established in 1948 in Jakarta to promote British culture in Indonesia through nurturing the core areas: English, arts, education and society.

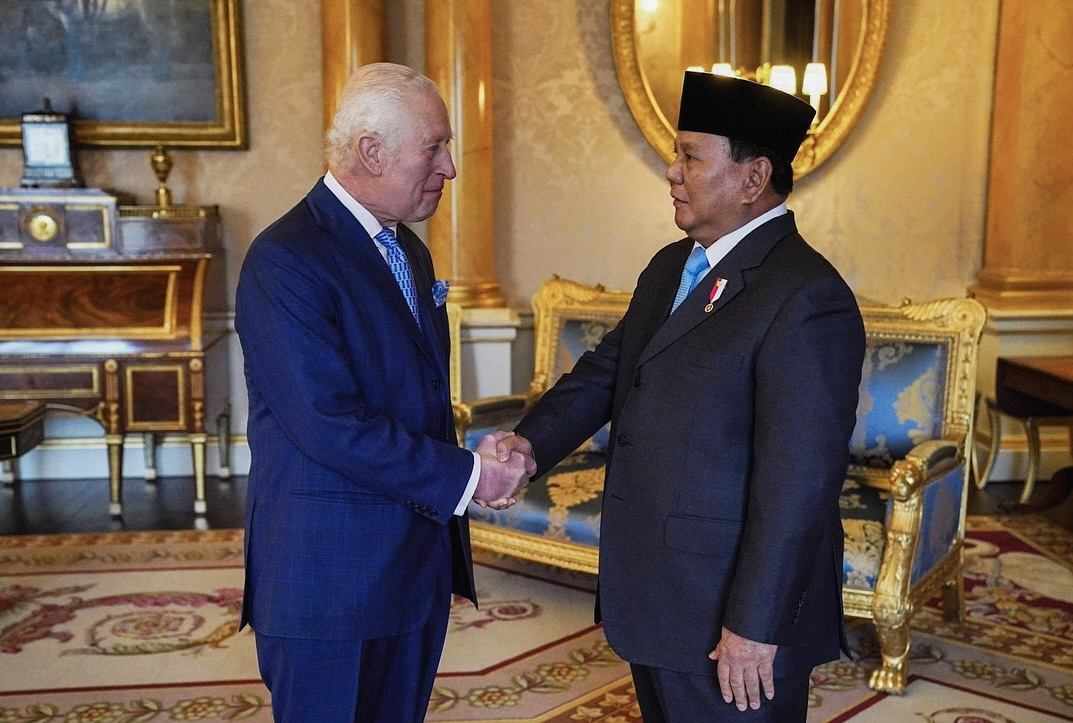
King Charles III with President Prabowo Subianto on 21 November 2024

In 1974, Queen Elizabeth II visited Indonesia, becoming the first British monarch to make an official visit to the country. In return for the Queen's historic visit to Indonesia five years later in November 1979, President Soeharto visited the UK and became the first Indonesian President to visit the country. Then in 1986 British Prime Minister Margaret Thatcher visited Indonesia and marked the increasingly warm relations between the two countries. In 1989 the heir to the British throne, Prince and Princess of Wales came and visited Indonesia. The royal couple visited the Sitanala Leprosy Hospital in Tangerang, Taman Mini Indonesia Indah in Jakarta, Kraton Yogyakarta, Borobudur and Bali. The Prince of Wales later revisited Yogyakarta and Borobudur in 2008. In October 2012, Indonesian President Yudhoyono received the prestigious Honorary Knights Grand Cross of the Order of the Bath awarded by Queen Elizabeth II.

== Cooperation ==
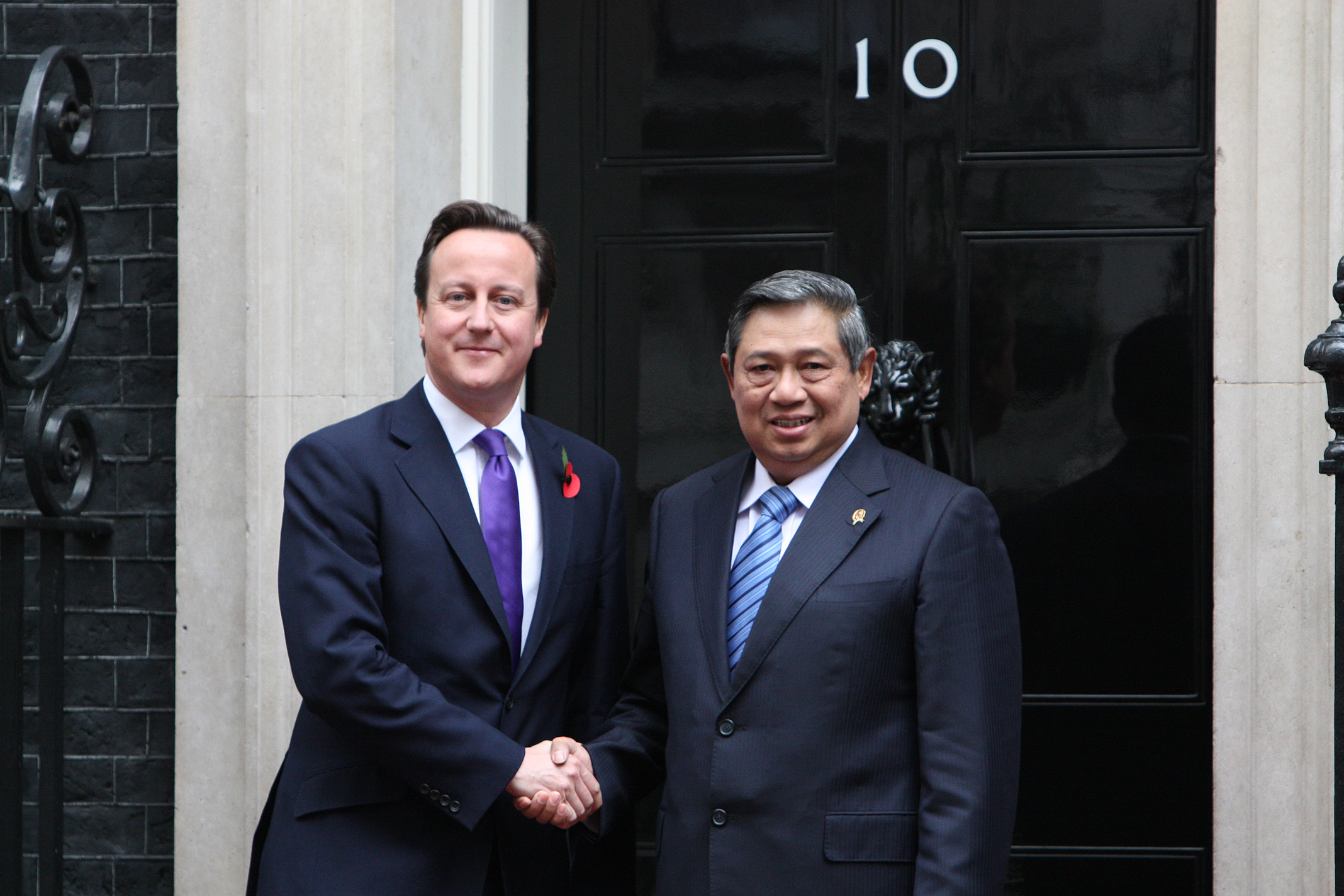
British Prime Minister David Cameron meeting with President Susilo Bambang Yudhoyono

In 2006, the then British Prime Minister Tony Blair met with then Indonesian President Susilo Bambang Yudhoyono, where they agreed upon "the establishment of a regular Indonesia-UK Partnership Forum to be chaired by the Foreign Ministers, to promote strategic dialogue on bilateral, multilateral and global issues". The first Indonesia-UK forum was held in 2007, and was chaired by British Foreign Secretary Margaret Beckett and Indonesian Foreign Minister Hassan Wirajuda.

In March 2010, members of the House of Lords praised Indonesia for their progress in democratising society, media freedom and environmental protection. In a meeting with Indonesian MP Hayono Isman, the Lords stated that they wanted to improve the relationship between the two countries.

In 2010, the Culture and Tourism Ministry of Indonesia launched a campaign to boost the number of tourists from the UK entering Indonesia. In 2009, 160,000 British tourists had visited Indonesia, and the aim of the campaign was to boost this number to 200,000.

== Trade and investment ==
Exports of UK goods to Indonesia in 2010 were worth £438.9 million, an increase of 25% over the previous year, whilst imports of goods to the UK from Indonesia saw an increase of 13% to £1.3 billion. British companies operating in Indonesia include energy giant BP, lenders Standard Chartered Bank and HSBC and tobacco group British American Tobacco, while Indonesian company operating in the UK is Bank Negara Indonesia.

== See also ==
- Foreign relations of Indonesia
- Foreign relations of United Kingdom
