= Boediardjo =

Indonesian politician

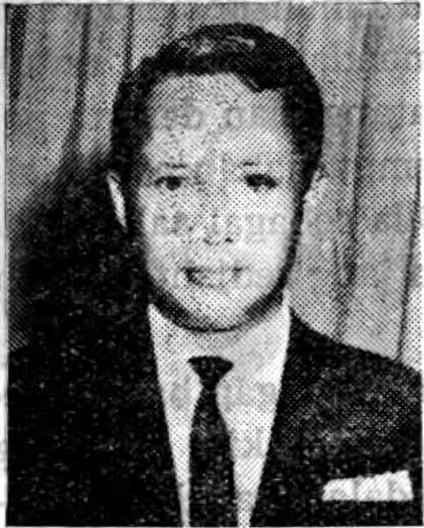

Indonesian Minister of Information
- In office 6 June 1968 – 28 March 1973
- President: Suharto
- Preceded by: B.M. Diah

Indonesian Ambassador for Cambodia
- In office 1965–1968
- President: Sukarno

Indonesian Ambassador for Spain
- In office 1976–1979
- President: Suharto

Personal details
- Born: 16 November 1921 Indonesia
- Died: 15 March 1997 (aged 75) Jakarta
- Spouse: Sri Redjeki Boediardjo
- Children: Dandung Bardo Kahono, Ennie Angkawati Boediardjo, Grombyang Setyaning Boediardjo, Iwan Wiwoho
- Education: Royal Air Force Staff College
- Occupation: Diplomat, Minister, Air Officer

Air Marshal Boediardjo (16 November 1921 – 15 March 1997) was an Indonesian Minister of Information (1968–1973) for the Indonesian First Development Cabinet.

== Education ==
- Hollandisch-Inlandische School (HIS) Rejosari, Semarang, Indonesia (1935)
- Meer Uitgebreid Lager Onderwijs (MULO), Magelang, Indonesia (1939)
- Radio Technical Education, Bandung, Indonesia (1940)
- Education in Railways School, Semarang, Indonesia (1943–1944)
- Education in Aviation School, Bandung, Indonesia (1951)
- Squadron Commander's Course, Jakarta, Indonesia (1952)
- School of Life Sciences Strategy, Jakarta, Indonesia (1952)
- Royal Air Force Staff College, Andover, England (1954).

== Career ==
- Member of Militaire Luchtvaart (1939–1942)
- Member of Rikuyu Sokyoku (1943–1945)
- Deputy Minister Air Force Chief Staff (1945–1965)
- Director of Communication and Navigation in Indonesian Air Force (1952)
- Indonesian Air Force Attaché in Cairo, Egypt (1956–1961)
- Indonesian Ambassador for Cambodia (1965–1968)
- Indonesian Minister of Information (1968–1973)
- Indonesian Ambassador for Spain (1976–1979)
- Director of Borobudur & Prambanan Temple Recreational Park (1979–1985)
- Chairman of Indonesian Press Association (1972)
- Chairman of the Indonesian Orchid Association [PAI] (1962–1983)
- Chairman of the Social and Culture [PEPABRI] (1974–1978)
- Chairman of the Wayang Puppet Foundation [Nawangi] (1974–)
- Head of Indonesian Economic, Social and Cultural Affairs – Veterans Legion (1979–)

== Awards ==
- Bintang Gerilya
- Bintang Garuda
- Bintang Dharma
- Bintang Mahaputera Adipradana (1973)
- Bintang Adikarya Pariwisata (1996)
