= Hadi Thayeb =

Indonesian diplomat

Teuku Mohammad Hadi Thayeb KCVO
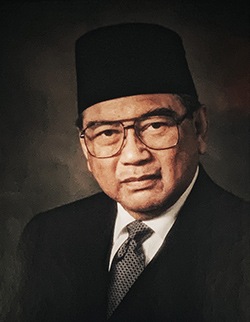
- Hadi Thayeb in 1990

Minister of Textile Industries and Handicraft
- In office 22 February 1966 – 25 July 1966
- President: Sukarno
- Preceded by: Abdul Azis Saleh
- Succeeded by: Muhammad Sanusi

Minister of Basic Industries
- In office 27 August 1964 – 22 February 1966
- President: Sukarno
- Preceded by: Chaerul Saleh
- Succeeded by: Mohammad Jusuf

12th Governor of Aceh
- In office 27 August 1981 – 27 August 1986
- President: Suharto
- Preceded by: Eddy Sabara
- Succeeded by: Ibrahim Hasan

Personal details
- Born: 14 September 1922 Peureulak, Dutch East Indies
- Died: 10 January 2014 (aged 91) Jakarta, Indonesia

Teuku Mohammad Hadi Thayeb KCVO (14 September 1922 – 10 January 2014) was a senior Indonesian diplomat and politician. Thayeb, one of Indonesia's first diplomats, was a co-founder of the Ministry of Foreign Affairs in 1945. He also served as the national Minister of Industry from 1964 to 1966 and the Governor of Aceh from 1981 to 1986.

== Early life ==
Thayeb was born on 14 September 1922, in Peureulak, Aceh.

== Career ==
Thayeb was one of the co-founders of the Ministry of Foreign Affairs, which was founded in 1945 following the Proclamation of Indonesian Independence. The Ministry was initially headquartered in the garage of the country's first Foreign Minister, Achmad Soebardjo, at Jl. Cikini 80–82 in Jakarta. Thayeb was one of the Foreign Ministry's first six staff members. Thayeb served as Indonesia's envoy to numerous countries throughout his diplomatic career, including Ambassador to Italy, Poland, Saudi Arabia, Switzerland and the United Kingdom. In 2012, he was appointed an Honorary Knight Commander of the Royal Victorian Order.

Thayeb served as Indonesia's Minister of Industry from 1964 to 1966 and the Governor of the National Resilience Institute from 1974 to 1979. He was also the Governor of Aceh from 1981 to 1986.

== Death ==
Hadi Thayeb died in Jakarta on 10 January 2014, at the age of 91. His death was announced in a press release issued by Foreign Minister Marty Natalegawa who wrote, "He was one of the founders of the Foreign Ministry...He was one of Indonesia’s best diplomats." Thayeb was buried at Karet Bivak Cemetery in Jakarta.
