= Marina Joesoef =

Indonesian artist

- Born: Marina Sastrowardoyo; 24 March 1959 (age 66); Jakarta, Indonesia
- Occupations: artist photographer
- Spouse: Iwan V. Joesoef
- Children: Marwan Arie Joesoef; Nurfahd S. Joesoef; Tiara R. Joesoef
- Father: Dr. Sumarsono Sastrowardoyo

Marina Joesoef — born Marina Sastrowardoyo 24 March 1959 in Jakarta, Indonesia — is an Indonesian artist. She is a painter having recent exhibitions in Jakarta and Kuala Lumpur, Malaysia. She is also known as Marina Joesoef Sastrowardoyo, though Joesoef is her married surname.

In the early 1960s, Marina joined her parents and brothers to live in Los Angeles and Leiden, Netherlands, where her father, Dr. Sumarsono Sastrowardoyo, studied urology for six years, including a stint at University of California, Los Angeles. Marina attended schools in Santa Monica and Leiden.

After returning home to Indonesia, in 1976 she participated in a Miss Teen pageant organized by Gadis magazine and won the first prize.

== Family ==
Ms. Joesoef is the eldest daughter of Dr. Sumarsono Sastrowardoyo, a physician, surgeon and memoirist, and the late Ina Sastrowardoyo. An older brother, Ariawan Sastrowardoyo, died in 1995. Another brother, Dr. Aswin W. Sastrowardoyo, is a physician who was formerly a guitarist and vocalist with the music group Chaseiro from 1979 to 1983, and a younger sister, Lisa Damayanti Sastrowardoyo (b. 1962).

The actress Dian Sastrowardoyo is a niece of Ms. Joesoef.

She was married to the late Mr. Iwan V. Joesoef, a businessman, and has two sons Marwan Arie Joesoef (born 26 May 1976), Nurfahd S. Joesoef (born 4 March 1979) and one daughter Tiara R. Joesoef (born 5 July 1999).

Her paternal grandfather, Sutejo Sastrowardoyo, traced the family's ancestry back 18 generations to 15th century Java.

== Languages ==
Ms. Sastrowardoyo is fluent in Dutch and English, as well her native Javanese and Indonesian.
