= Youth Pledge Museum =

Museum in Jakarta, Indonesia

- Museum Sumpah Pemuda
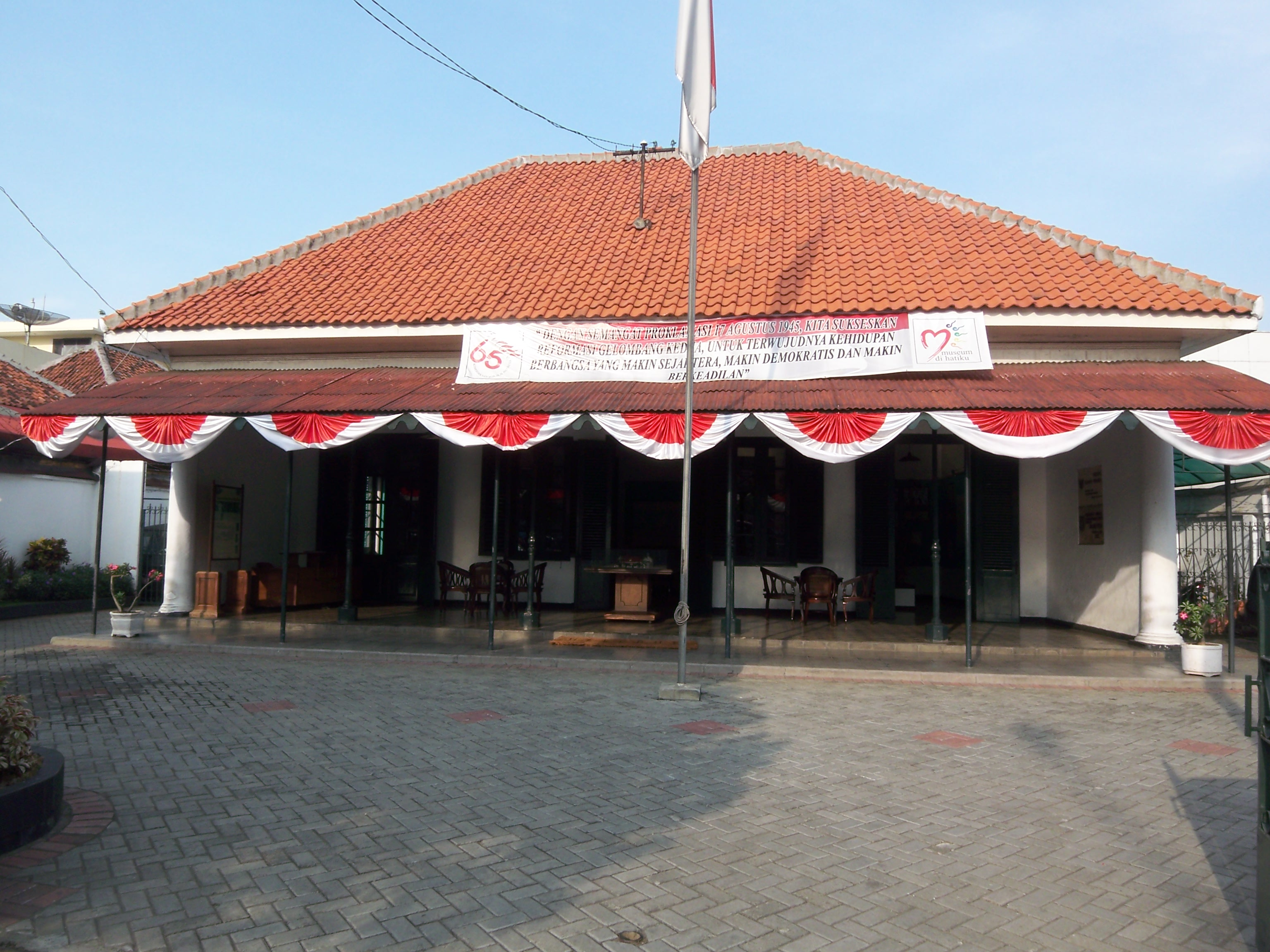
- The Youth Pledge Museum building
- Established: 20 May 1974
- Location: Jalan Kramat Raya 106, Central Jakarta, Jakarta, Indonesia
- Coordinates: 6.1838°S 106.8431°E
- Owner: Ministry of Culture (Indonesian Heritage Agency)
- Public transit access: Pal Putih
- Website: museumsumpahpemuda.kemdikbud.go.id

The Youth Pledge Museum (Indonesian: Museum Sumpah Pemuda) is a historic museum of the independence struggle of the Republic of Indonesia. It is located in Jalan Kramat Raya No.106, Central Jakarta and managed by the Ministry of Culture. The museum is open for public, every Tuesday until Friday from 08.00 to 15.00, every Saturday and Sunday from 08.00 to 14.00, and closed every Monday and national holiday.

This museum has a collection of photos and objects related to the history of 1928 Youth Pledge (Sumpah Pemuda), as well as the activities in the movement of the national youth of Indonesia. The Youth Pledge Museum was established based on the governor decree of the Special Administrative Region of Jakarta in 1972 and has become a national heritage object.

== History ==
The building on Jalan Kramat Raya 106, the place where the Youth Pledge was read, is a boarding house for students who initially was "the use of rights of the building are held by Sie Kong Lian.

In this building owned by the DKI government, there have been several movement figures, such as

- Muhammad Yamin
- Aboe Hanifah
- Amir Sjarifuddin
- Soegondo Djojopoespito
- Setiawan
- Soejadi
- Mangaradja Pintor
- A.K. Gani
- Mohammad Tamzil dan Assaat dt Moeda.

Since 1925 the Kramat building 106 became a boarding house which combined into Jong Java. Mostly Sekolah Pendidikan Dokter Hindia aka Stoviadan from the school of law RHS. Jong Java activist rent a 460-meter square building it's because of the previous contract at Kwitang too narrow to hold an scouting activities, political discussion and Javanese art rehearsal. Members of Jong Java and other students call this building Langen Siswo.

Since 1926, the resident of the building are increasingly diverse. Most of them are youth activist from various areas. The activities of the resident of the building are also increasingly diverse. Besides the arts, students in this building are also active in scouting and sports. This building also became the headquarters of Perhimpunan Pelajar-pelajar Indonesia (PPPI), which was established in September 1926, after the first youth congress.The rented occupants, under the umbrella of PPPI, often invited public figures such as Bung Karno to discussed. The students rented that building with a tariff of 12.5 gulden per person every month, or equivalent to 40 liters of rice at that time. They have workers that took care of the house known as Bang Salim.

The Dutch East Indies government always watching over tightly the activities of the youth meeting. The government admittedly citizens above 18 years old held a meeting and gathering. But time will tell to apply vergader-verbod or restriction to hold a meeting, because it is against the government. Every meeting must have approval from the police. After that, the meeting will be on full surveillance by the Politieke Inlichtingen Dienst (PID), sort of political intelligence agency. This house of 106 is also always in the intelligence service, including the third meeting of the second Youth Congress.

In this building also appeared the Indonesia Raya magazine, managed by PPPI. Because of the frequent use of national youth activities, the residents named this building the Indonesische Clubhuis, the official place for the national youth meetings. Since 1927, they installed the building's nameplate in front. Even Though Governor General H.J. de Graff is running iron hand politics.

The Youth activities were transferred to Jalan Kramat 156 after the occupants of Kramat 106 did not continue their rent in 1934. That building was then rented to Pang Tjem Jam as a residence in 1937–1951. After that, the building was rented again by Loh Jing Tjoe, who used it as a flower shop and hotel. The Kramat 106 building was rented by the Customs and Excise Inspectorate for offices in 1951 - 1970.

In 1968, Sunario took the initiative to gather the history of the Sumpah Pemuda, and asked the Governor of DKI to manage and return the building in Kramat Raya 106 to which Sie Kong Lian had "the right to build" but had expired to its original form. This place was agreed to become the Youth Oath Building, but the proposal to change the name of the Kramat Raya street to the Youth Oath Road has not been reached.

The Kramat 106 building was once restored by the DKI Jakarta Regional Government on 3 April-20 May 1973 and was inaugurated by the Governor of DKI Jakarta, Ali Sadikin, on 20 May 1973 as the Sumpah Pemuda Building. This building was again inaugurated by President Soeharto on May 20, 1974. In the course of history, the Sumpah Pemuda Building was once managed by the Regional Government of DKI Jakarta, and is currently managed by the Ministry of Culture and Tourism.

== Collection and layout of the exhibition ==
=== Collection ===
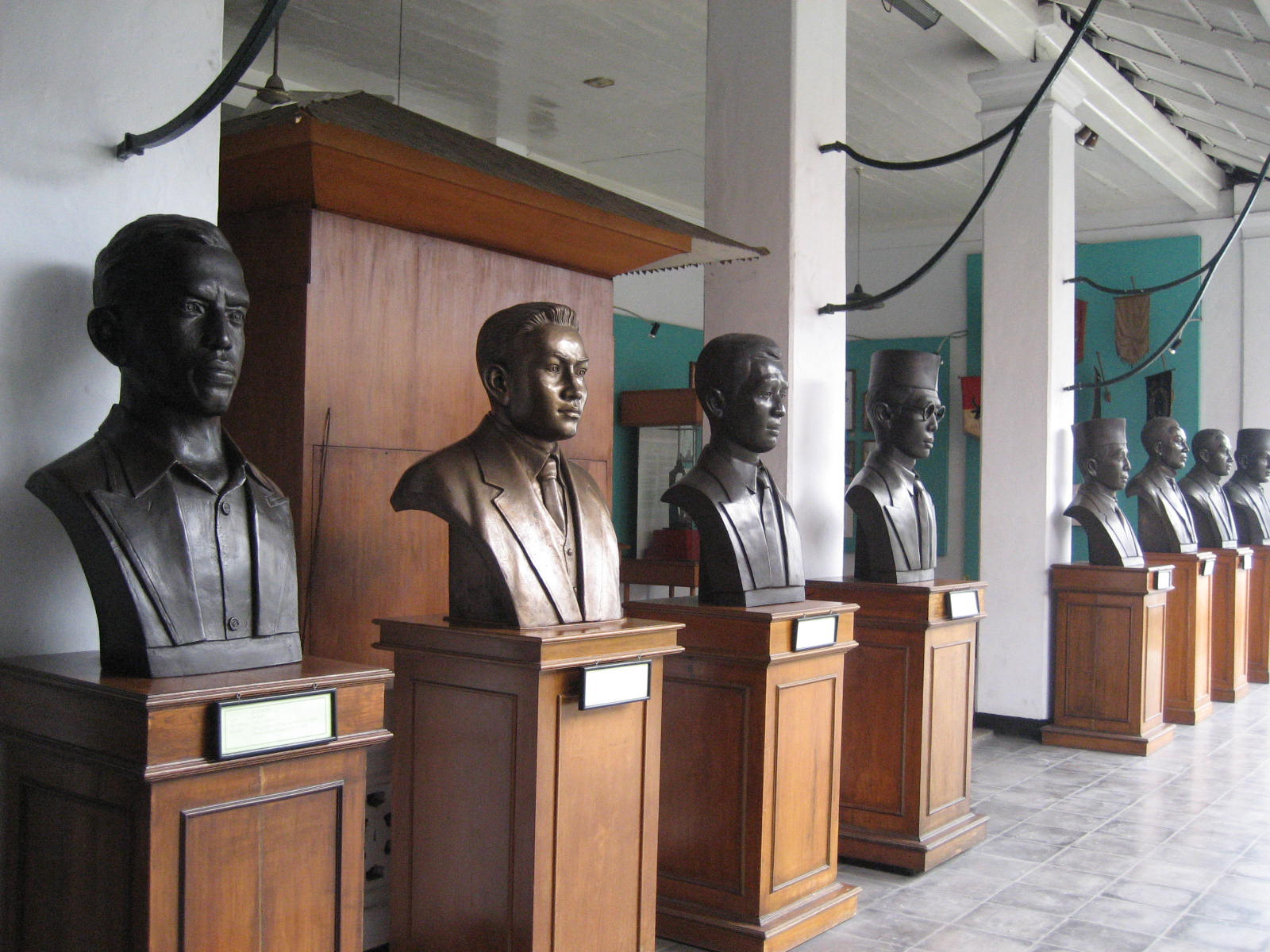
Sumpah Pemuda Museum collections in Jakarta

As a special museum, this museum collection consists of collections related to the Sumpah Pemuda event. In 2007, the total collection amounted to 2,867 collections, of which the main collection was Gedung Kramat 106 which was the planned site and held the Second Youth Congress, October 27–28, 1928. This building was divided into the main building and pavilion. The main building consists of a front porch, a living room, 5 rooms, and an open space or meeting room. While the pavilion building has 2 rooms.

The collection from this museum are:

- Photos of the activities of the youth organization (2,117 items)
- Organization flag, as much as 35 collection. .
- Stamps, as much as 11 collections
- Wage Rudolf Supratman violin's, as much as 1 collection.
- Chest statues of youth figures, as many as 8 collections.Statue of Youth figures, 11 collections.
- Guide equipment, 9 collections.
- Jacket of the class of 1966, as many as 2 collections.
- Chairs, as many as 5 collections.
- Paintings, 4 collections.
- Vespa, 1 collection.
- Diorama, 1 collection.
- Marble carvings, 3 collections.
- Monument of youth unity, as many as 1 collection.
- Hanging lamp, 2 collections.
- Mock-up of the youth oath museum building is 1 collection.
- Duratran, as many as 3 collections.
- KBI pocket book, 1 collection.
- Pewarta IPINDO, as many as 4 collections.
- Manuscripts of struggle statements of 66, as many as 90 collections.
- Fighting statement of 66, as many as 50 collections.
- Document of the struggle of 66, 18 collections.
- KAPPI Bulletin, 60 collections.
- Ade Irma Brigade documents, 104 collections.
- The process of preparation and implementation of extraordinary deliberations and upgrading all over Indonesia, as many as 23 collections.
- KAPPI Djaja Menteng Radja, Djakarta, 23 collections.
- KAPI Commissariat Diponegoro 80, Djakarta Raya, as many as 8 collections.
- The greeting of the governor of the head of the special area of the capital of Djakarta in commemorating "Red Brigadier" Ade Irma, as many as 17 collections.
- KAPI Jaya Salemba Raya Djakarta, as many as 62 collections.
- KAMI pusat Djakarta, as many as 43 collections.T
- The statement of batch 66 of the SCAI unit in Jakarta comprises 8 collections.
- The unit of AKSI "KAPPI" center in North Jakarta, as many as 20 collections.
- Unity of AKSI laborers PN Sabang Merauke Djakarta, as many as 16 collections.
- Bulletin KAMI kons Bandung and Bogor Djakarta 1967, 13 collections.
- KAMI Medan - North Sumatra, 8 collections.
- KAMI konsultan - Yogyakarta, as many as 5 collections. Basic budget KAMI, 24 collections.
- Inventory statement of batch 66, 13 collections.
- Black Discs, 1 collection.
- Wage Rudolf Supratman Award Charter, 2 collections.
- Dutch-era school Atlas, 1 collection.
- Hizbul Wathan's belt, as many as 1 collection.
- Bintang Mahaputra, as many as 1 collection.
- Replica of Wage Rudolf Supratman violin's, as many as 1 collection.

=== Layout of the exhibition ===
The collection owned by this museum is exhibited in a permanent exhibition hall with an arrangement that follows the chronology of the Youth Oath event in the hope of describing the strands of the Youth Oath event.

The exhibition arrangement is as follows:

==== Introduction Room ====
This room is located in the front entrance of the building, exactly at the front entrance. In this room it exhibited:

- Map of Indonesia seating placement from various youth organizations
- Map of Jakarta that shows the place where the second youth congress took place and its conditions today.
- The Committee of Kongres Pemuda Kedua
- Chest Statue of Muhammad Yamin and Sugondo Djojopuspito
- Participant organization of the youth congress
- Mock-up of the Sumpah Pemuda building

In the front room, it is also still use the original tile floors from the Dutch era which are now quite rare in Jakarta.

===== Introductory room gallery =====
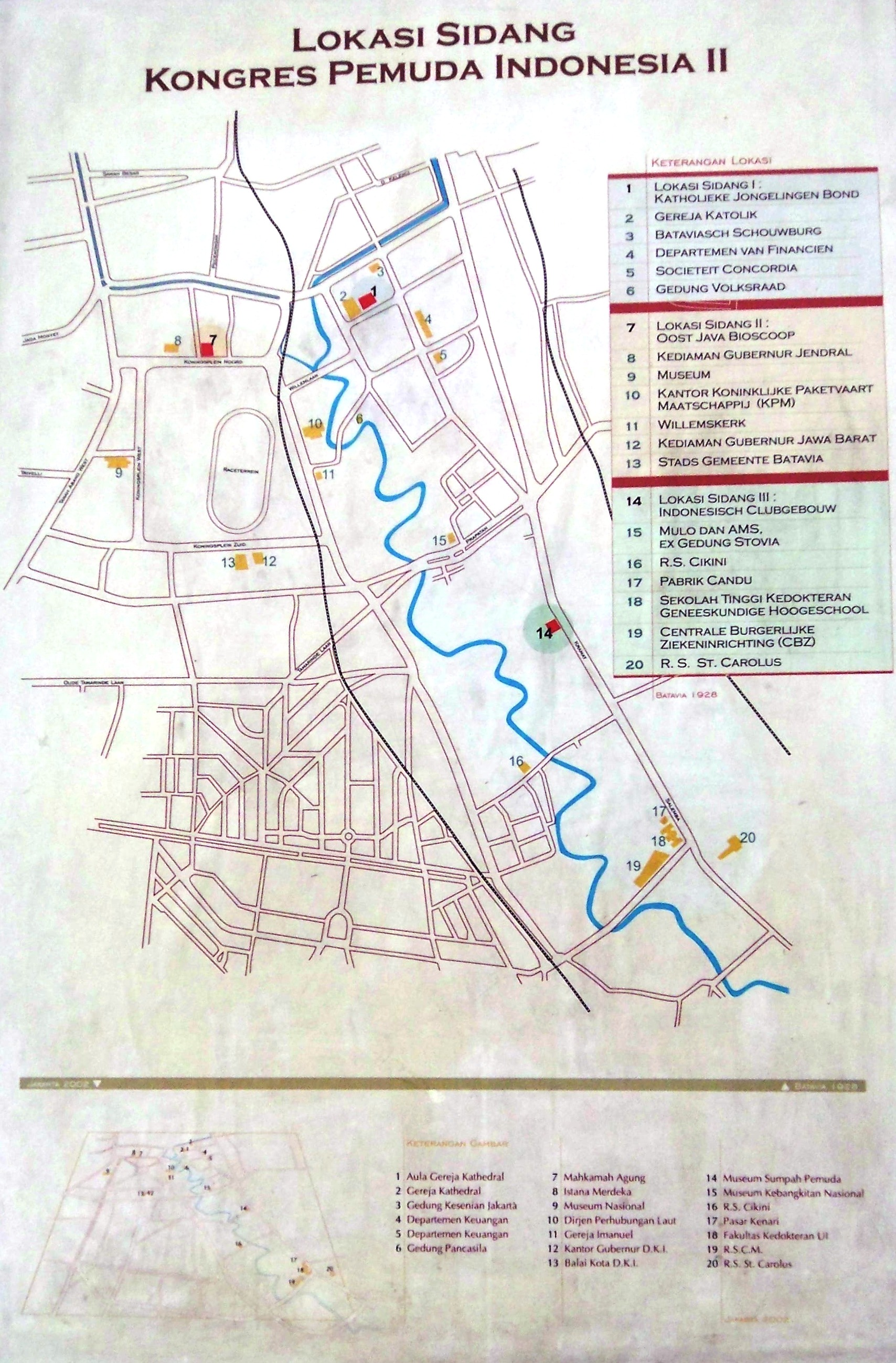
Lokasi Kongres Pemuda Indonesia Kedua, dulu dan sekarang

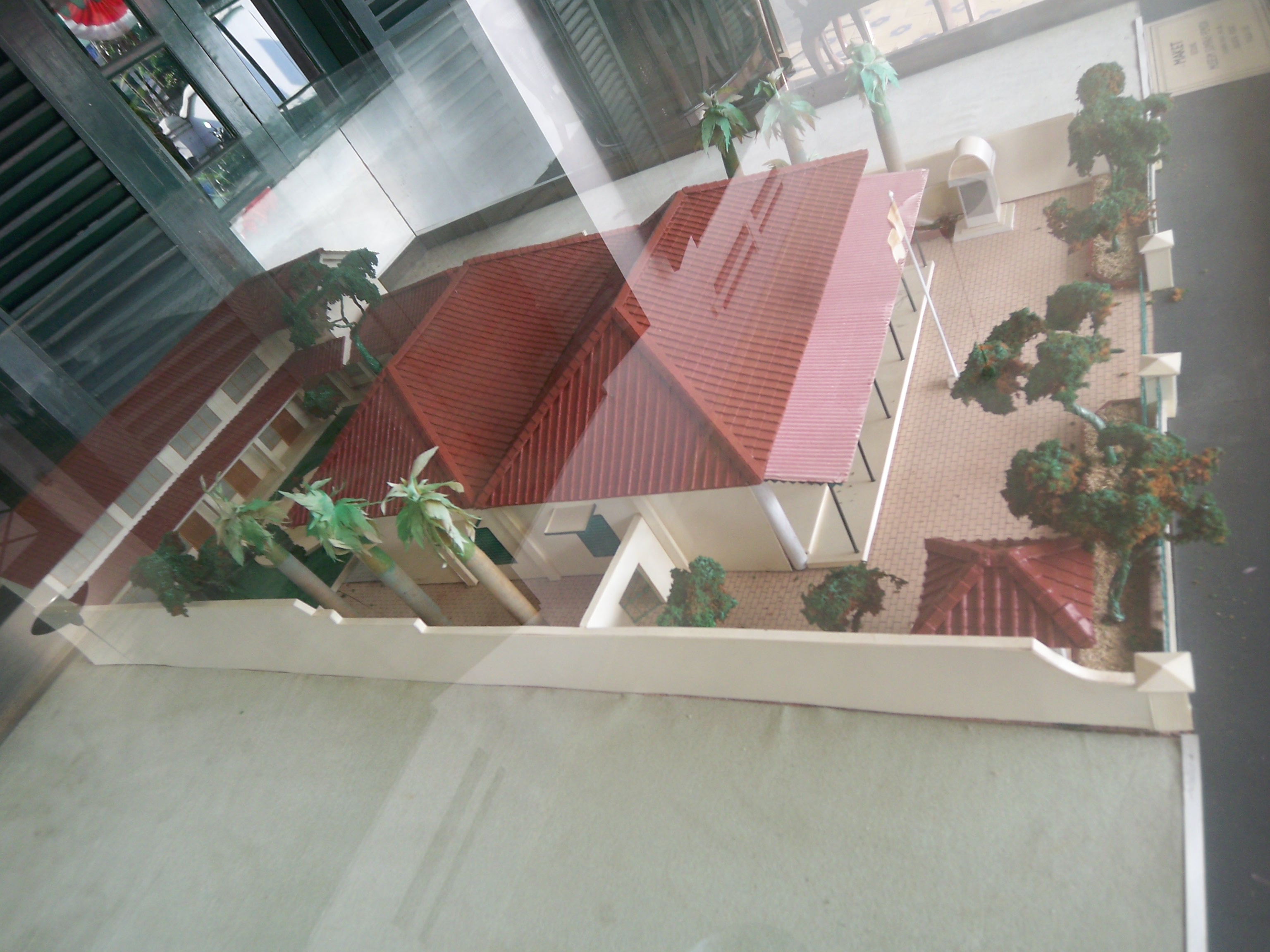
Maket gedung Sumpah Pemuda

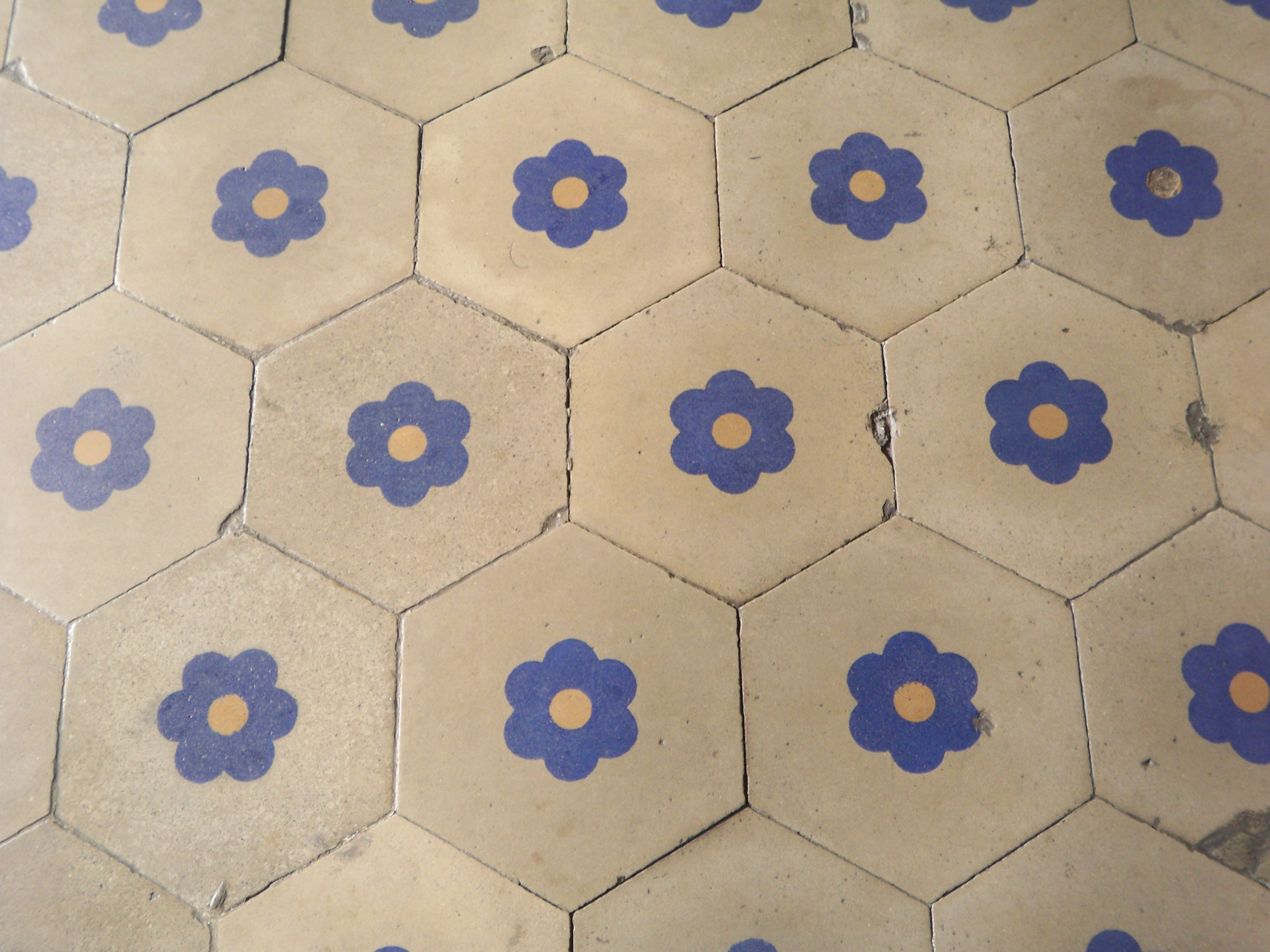
Lantai ubin asli peninggalan penjajah Belanda

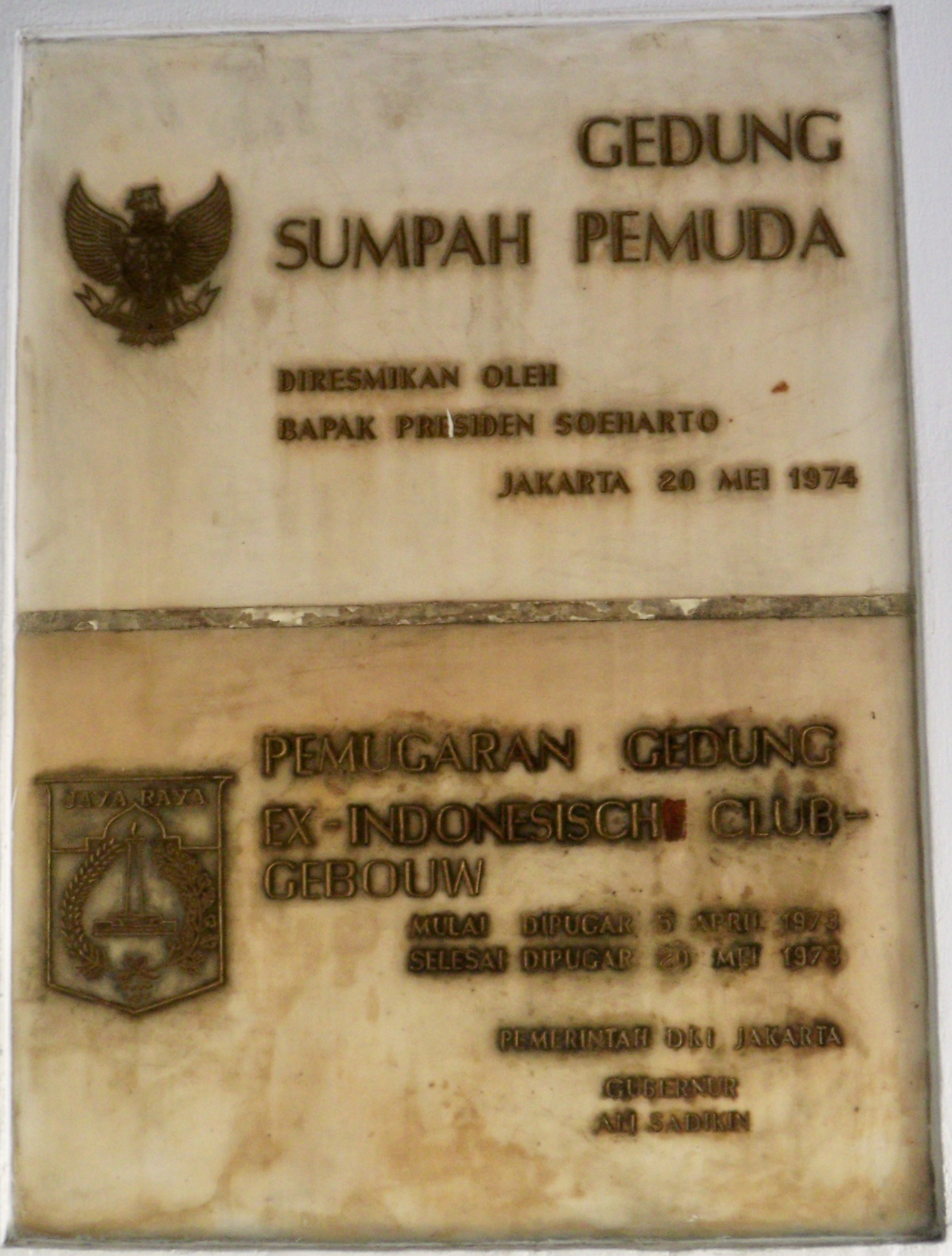
Marmer plakat gedung Sumpah Pemuda

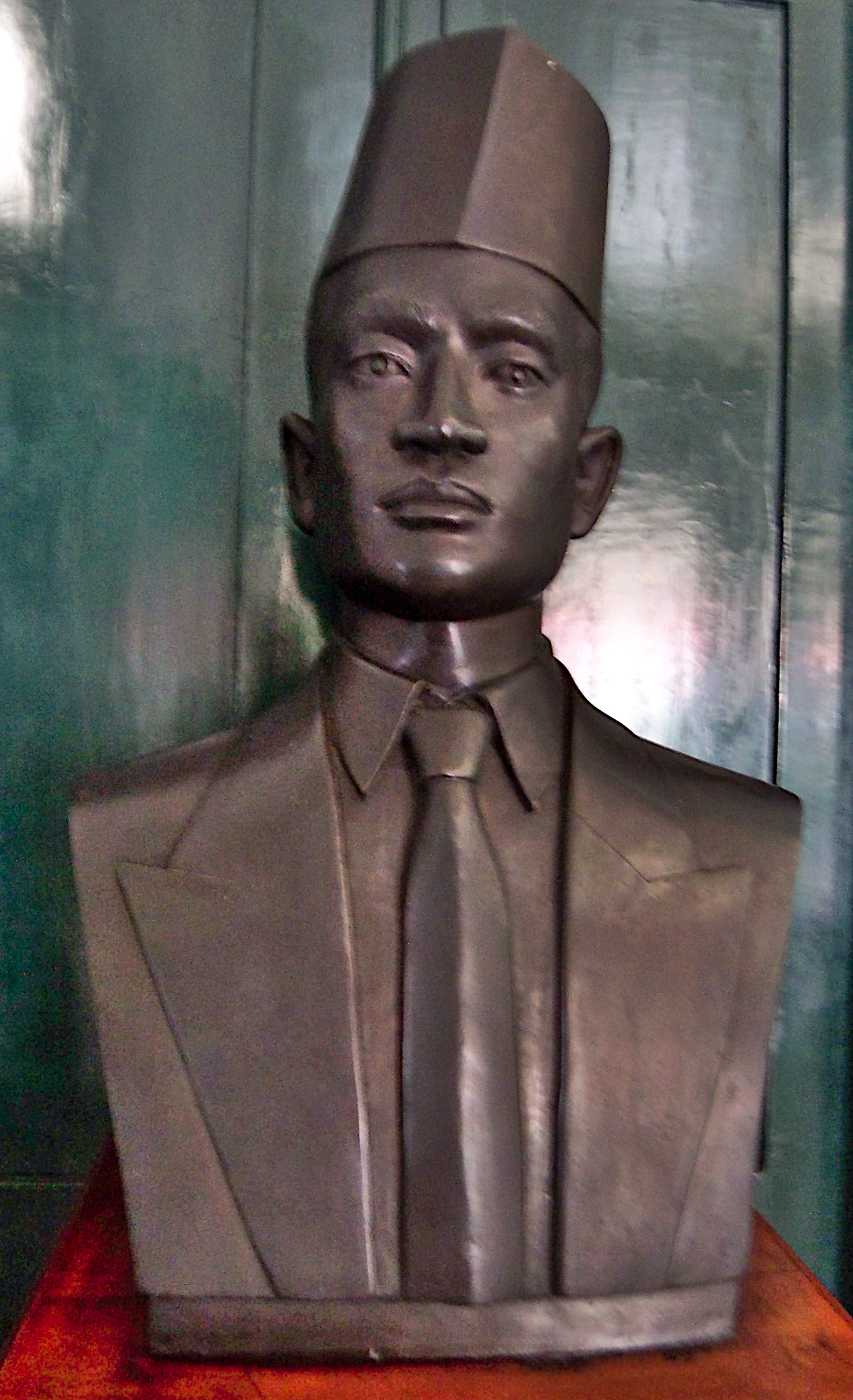
Patung dada Sugondo Djojopuspito

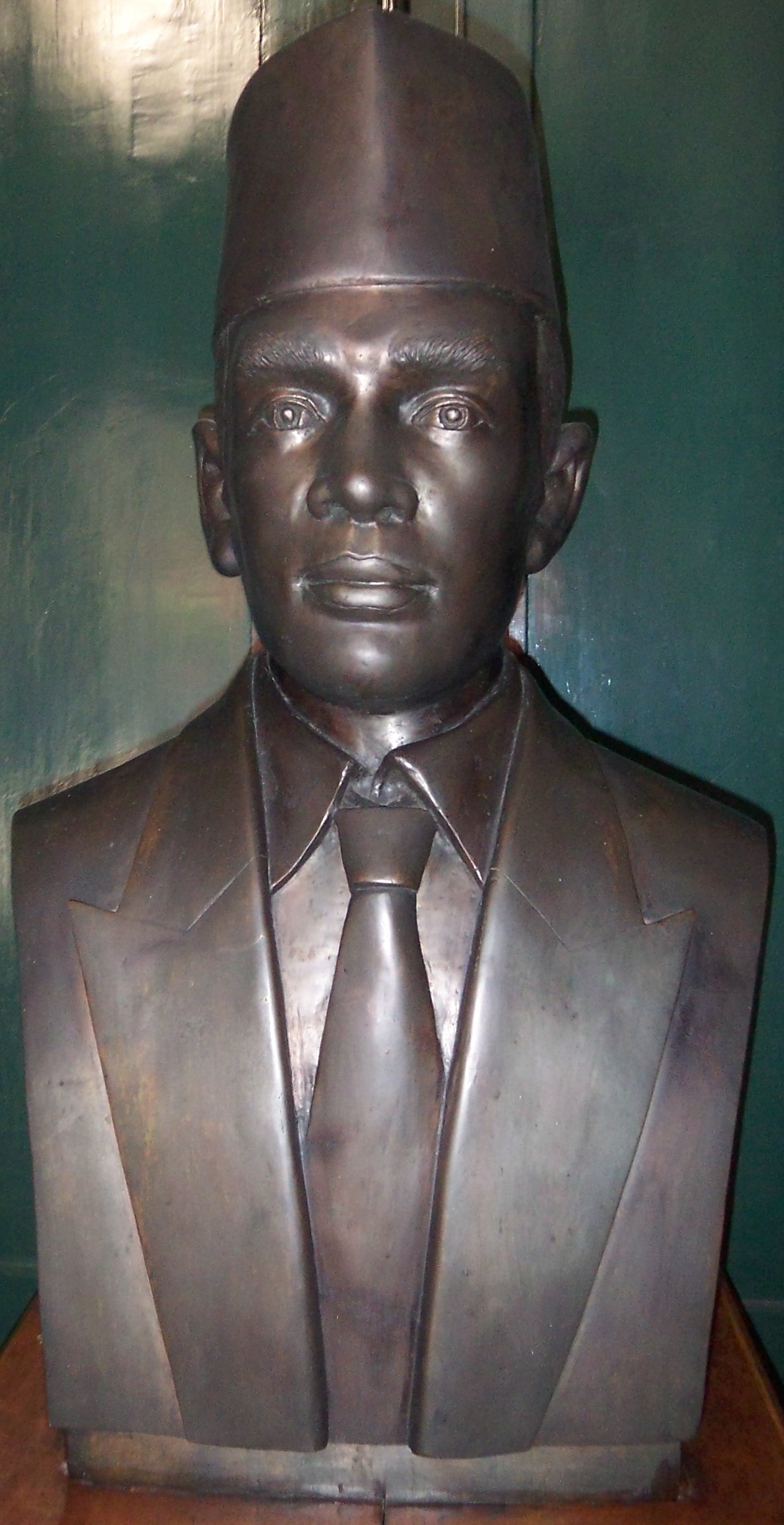
Patung dada Muhammad Yamin

==== Youth Growth organization chamber ====
This room is located in the front of the building parallel with the introductory room. This room can be accessed from the introductory room with entering the entrance to the left.

In this room describes the early growth of the youth organization which begins with Perhimpunan Indonesia in the Netherlands. This room which exhibits the activities of the youth movement activities, among others:

- Perhimpunan Indonesia
- Jong Java
- Jong Sumatranen Bond
- Pemuda Kaum Betawi
- Jong Islamieten Bond dan
- Kepanduan atau INPO

In this room also can be found realia in the form of guided equipment used in the 1920s.

===== Gallery of this room =====
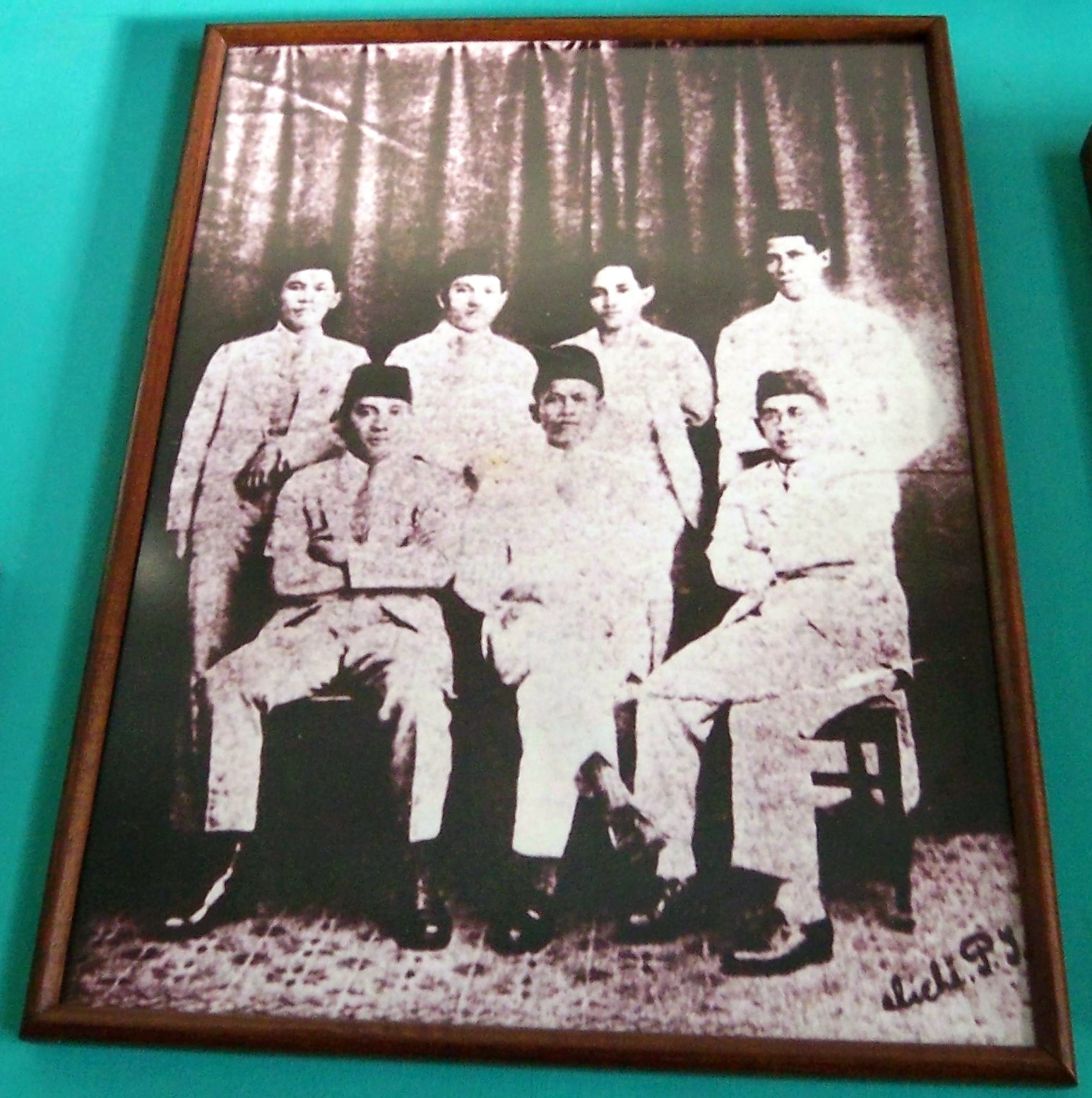
Partai Nasional Indonesia

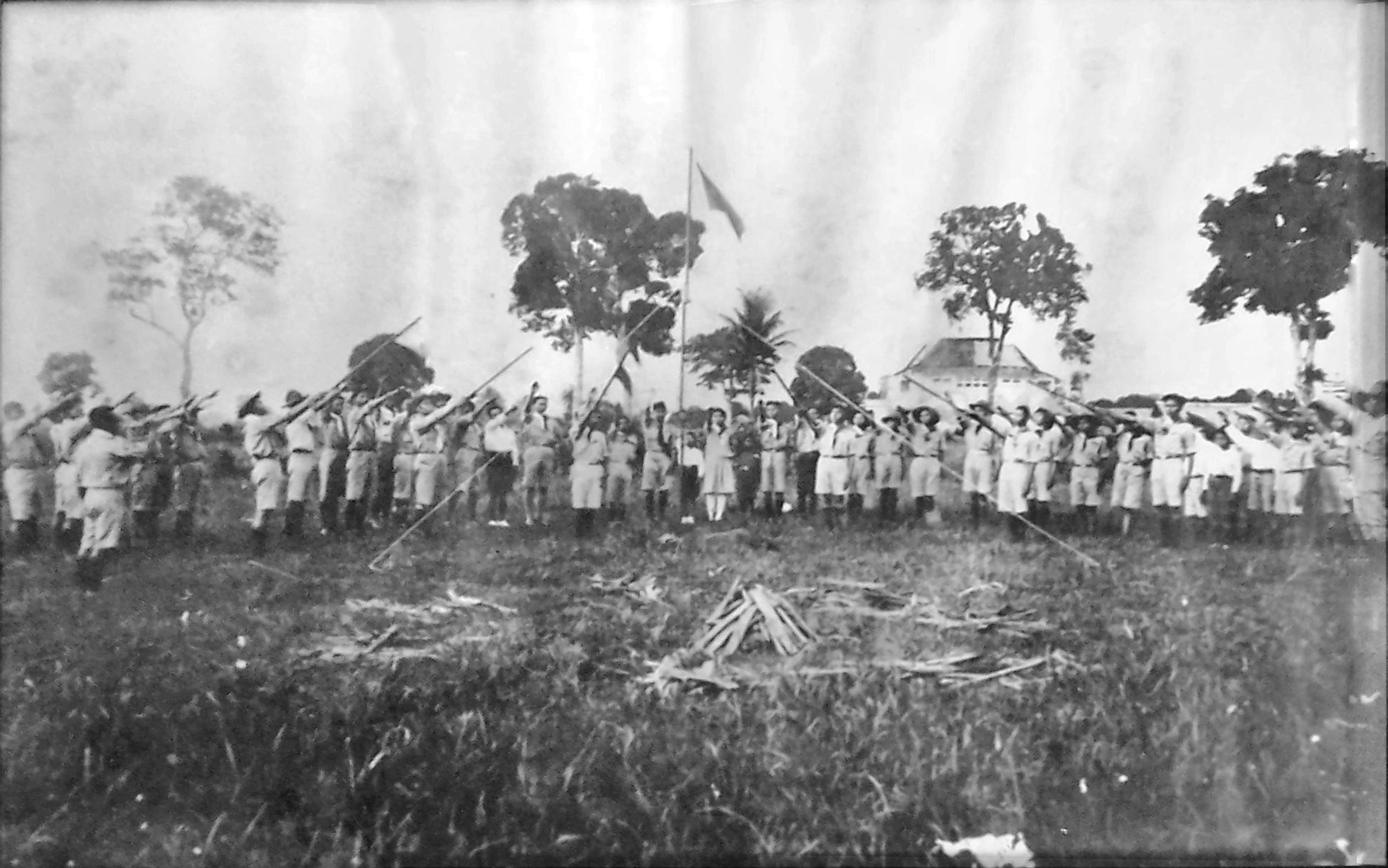
INPO atau Gerakan Pramuka Indonesia

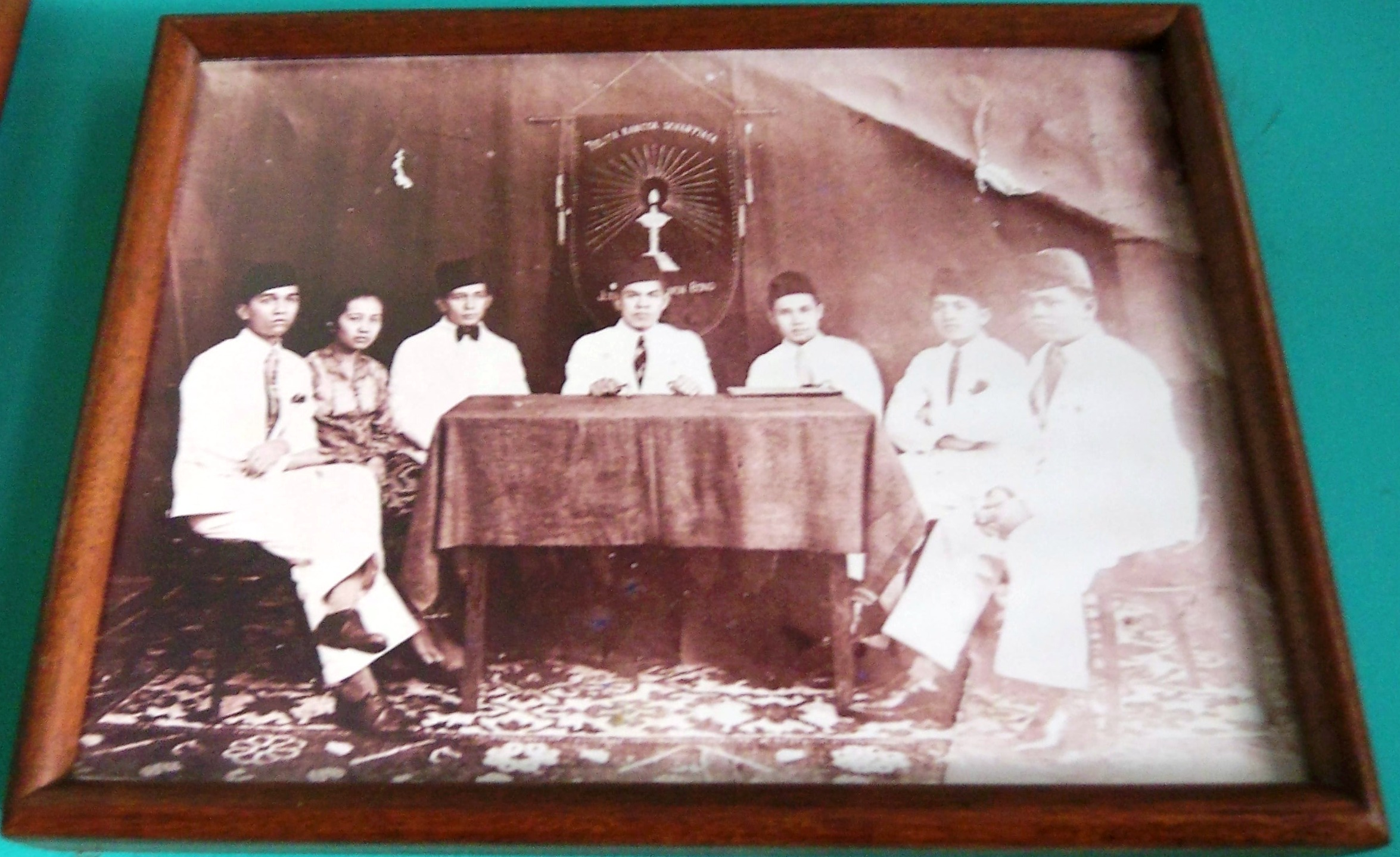
Jong Sumatranen Bond

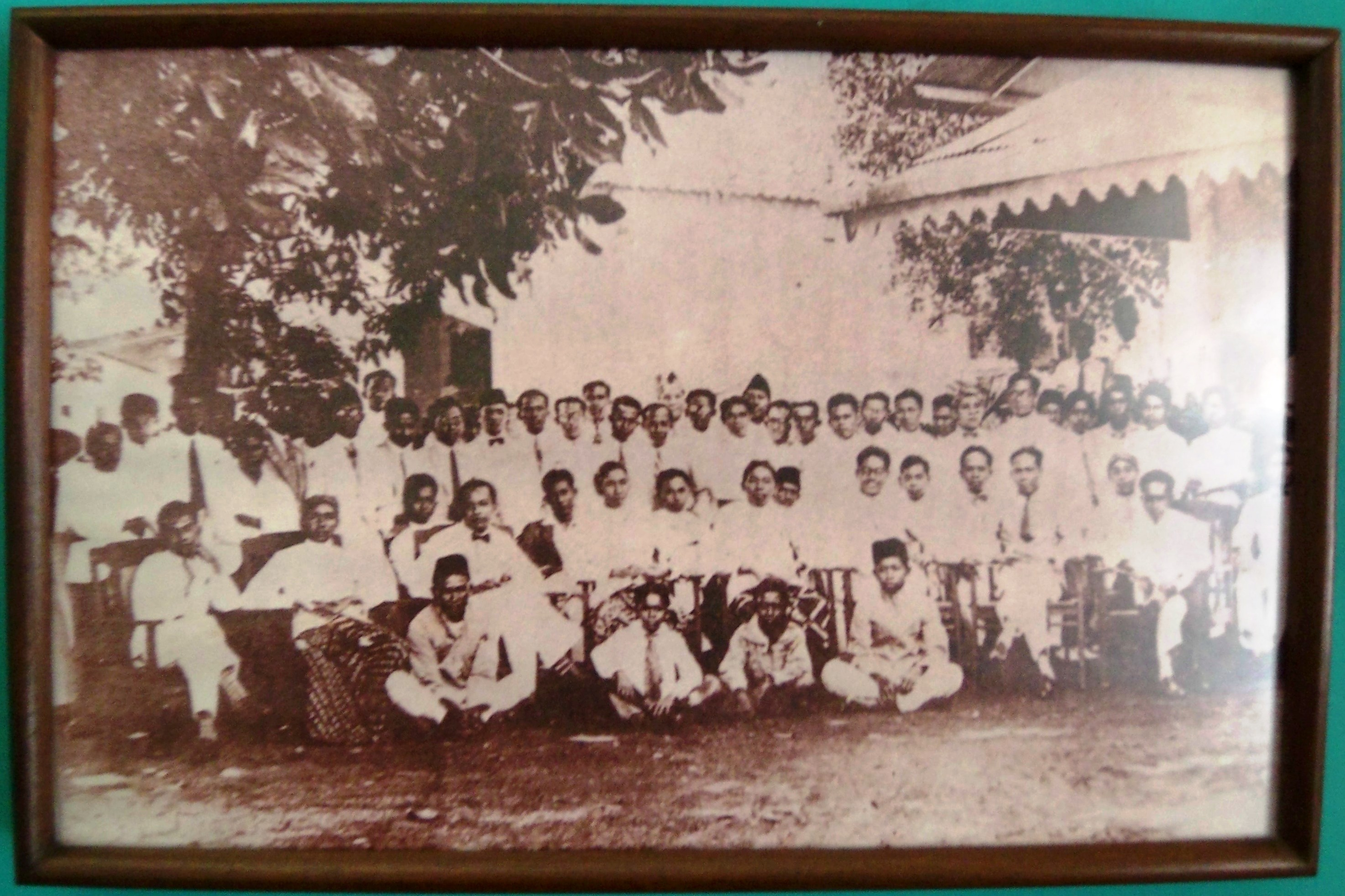
Indonesisch Clubgebouw

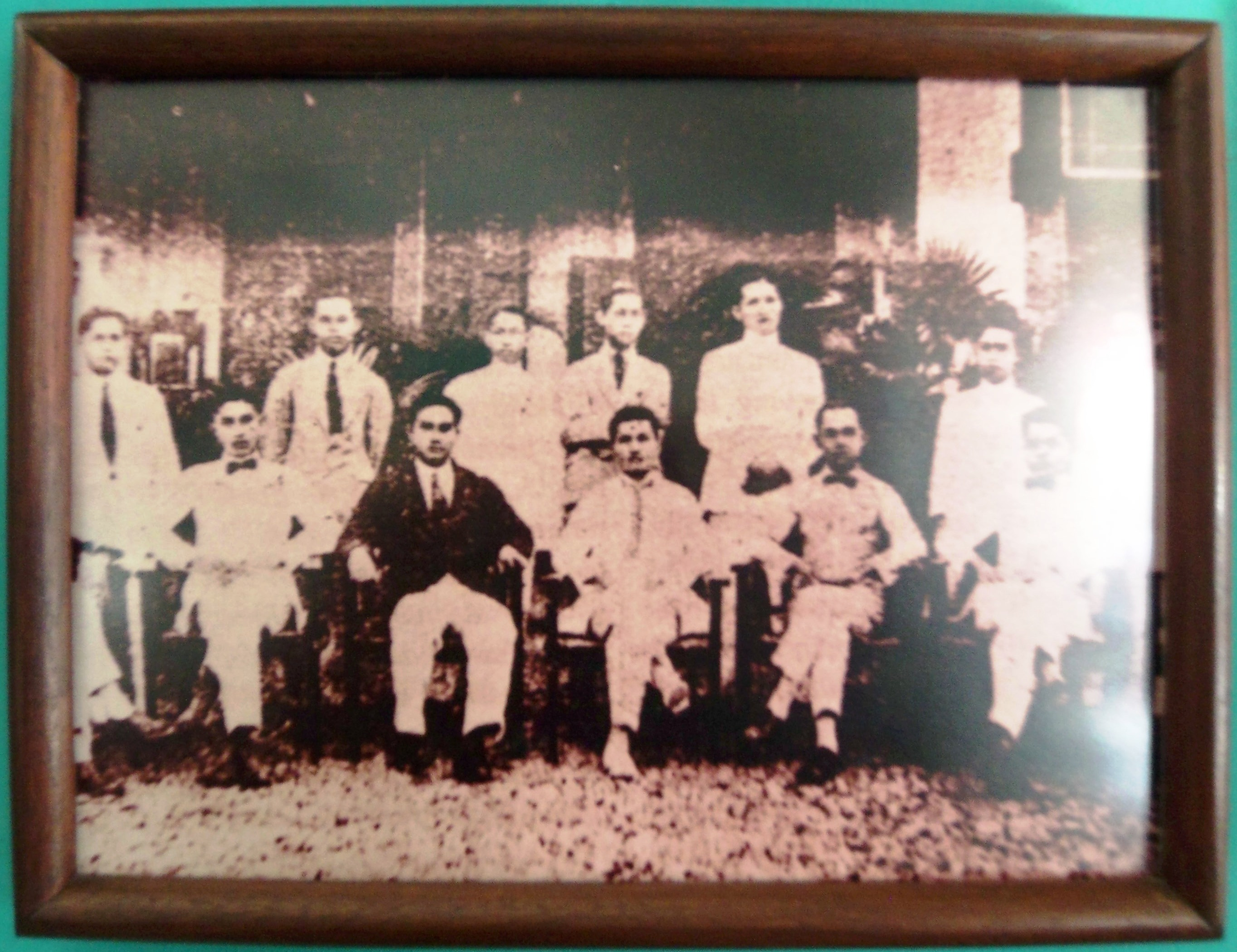
Jong Batak

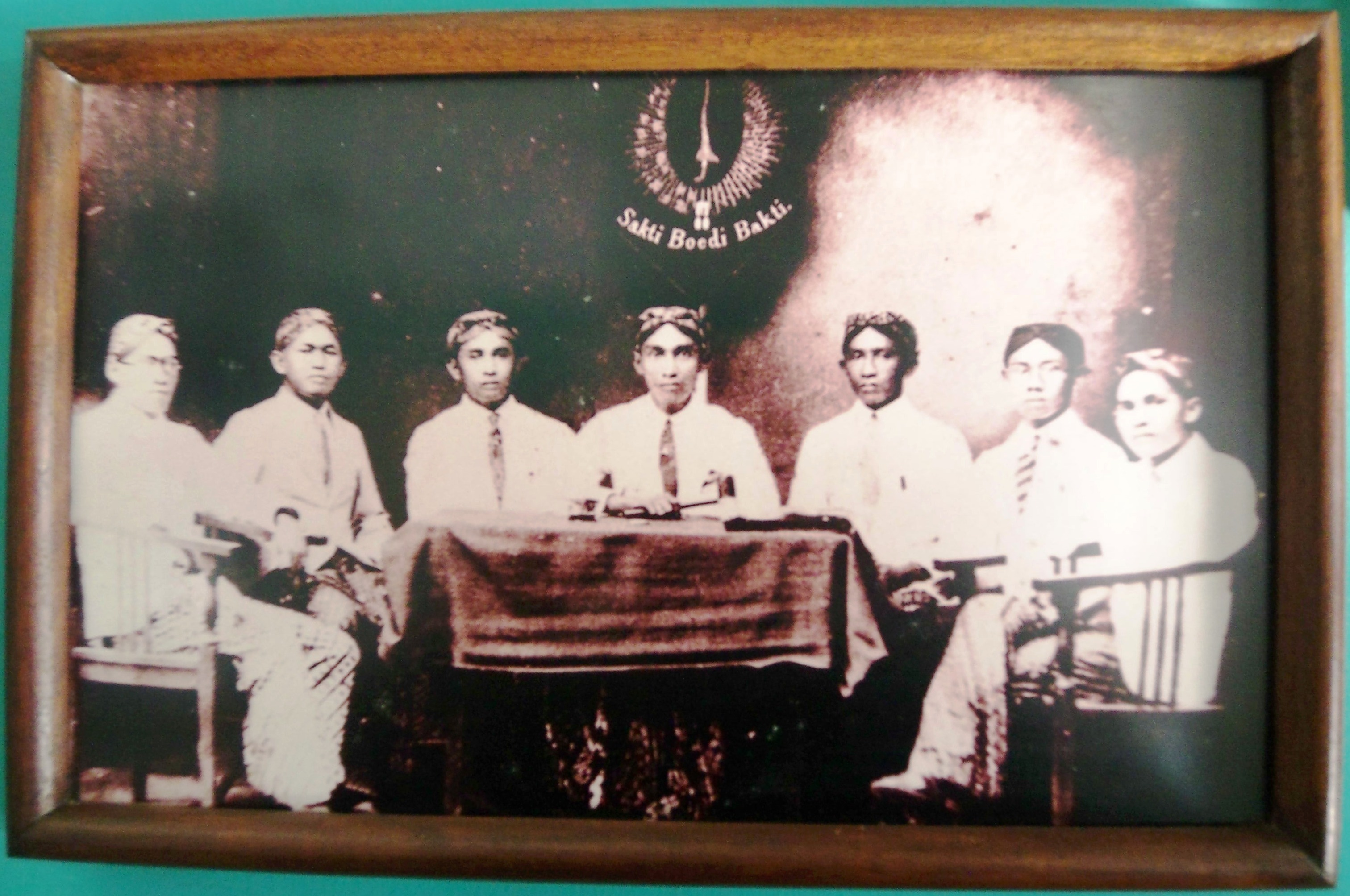
Jong Java

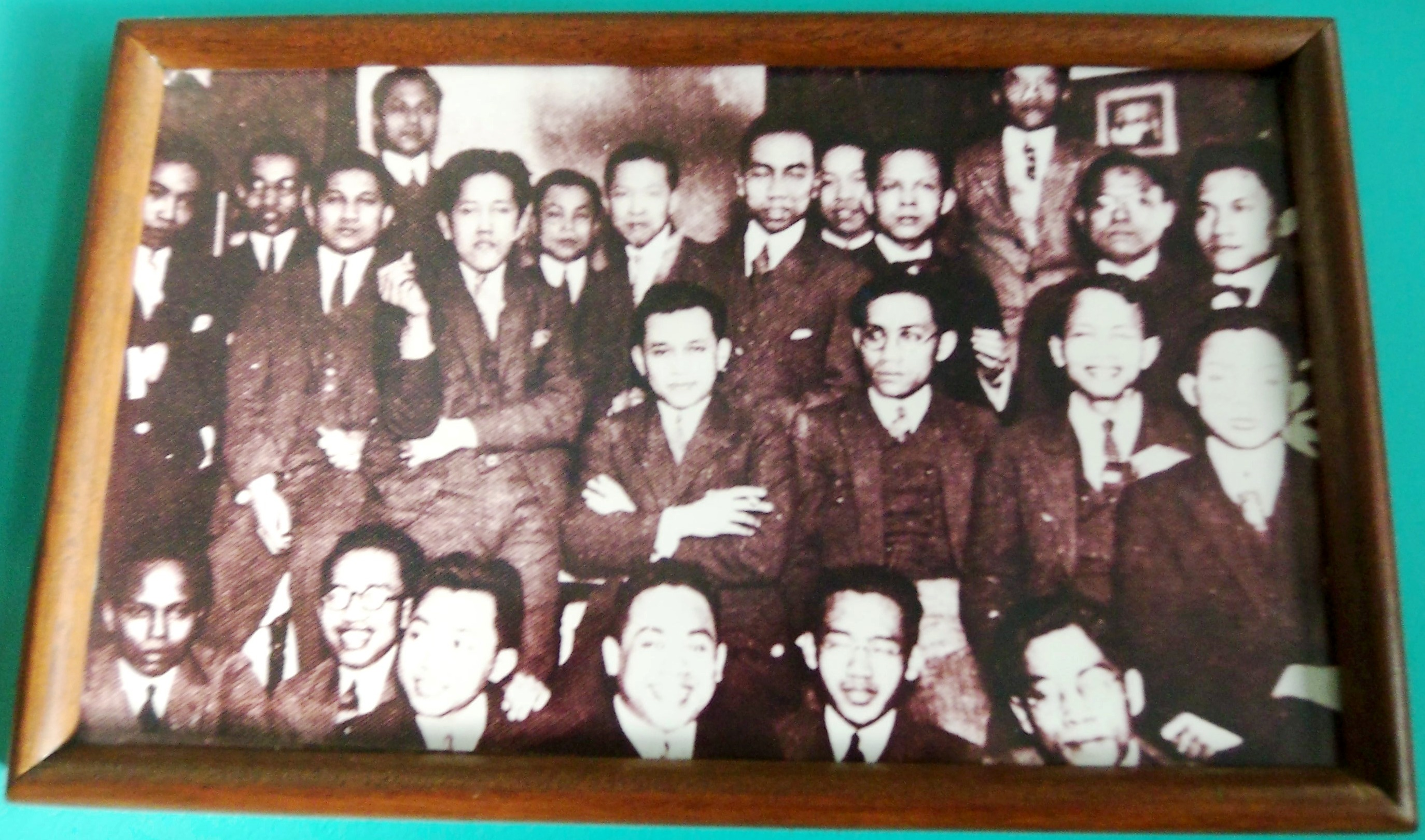
Pemuda Indonesia

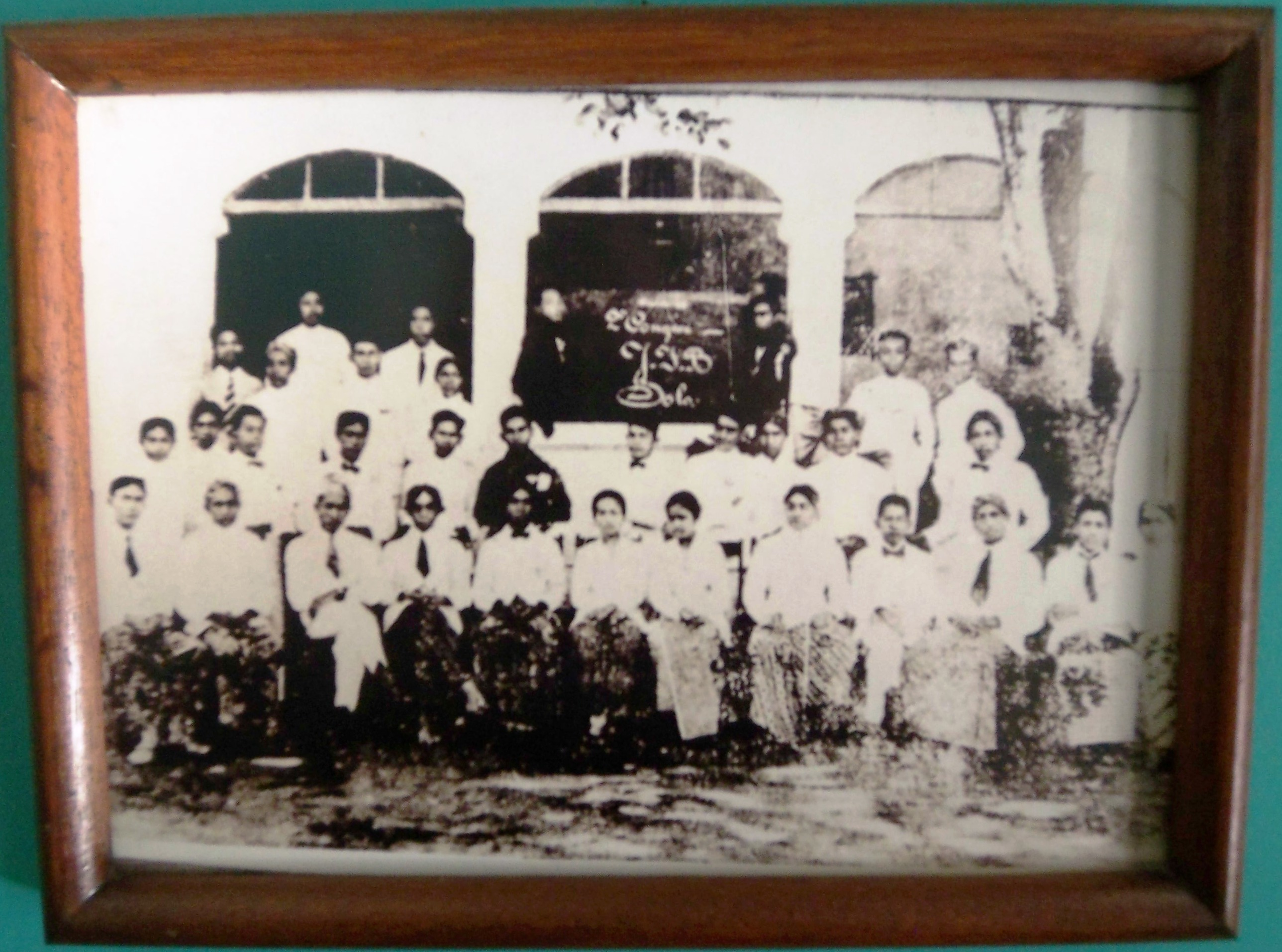
Jong Islamieten Bond

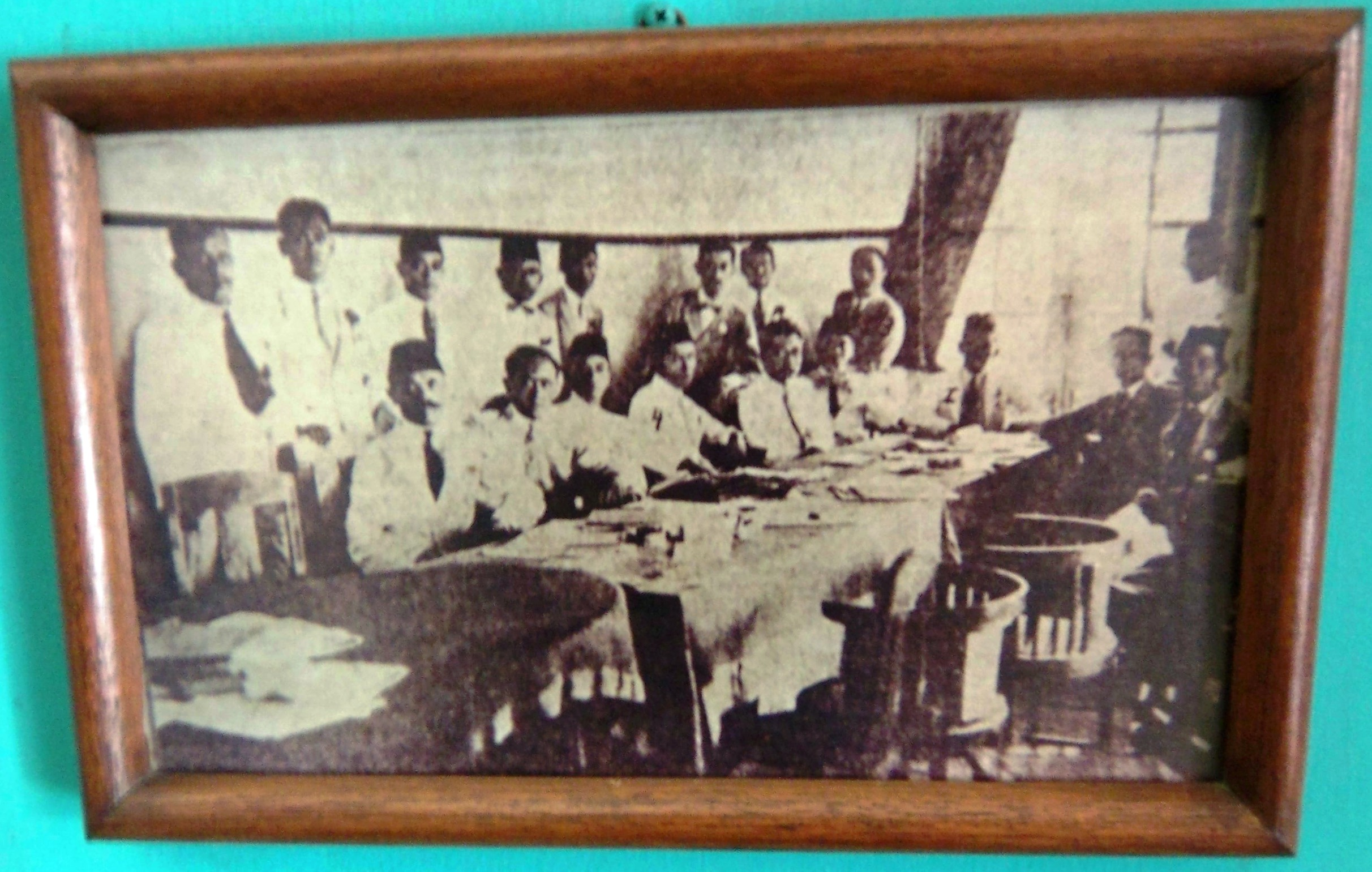
Permufakatan Perhimpunan-perhimpunan Politik Kebangsaan Indonesia

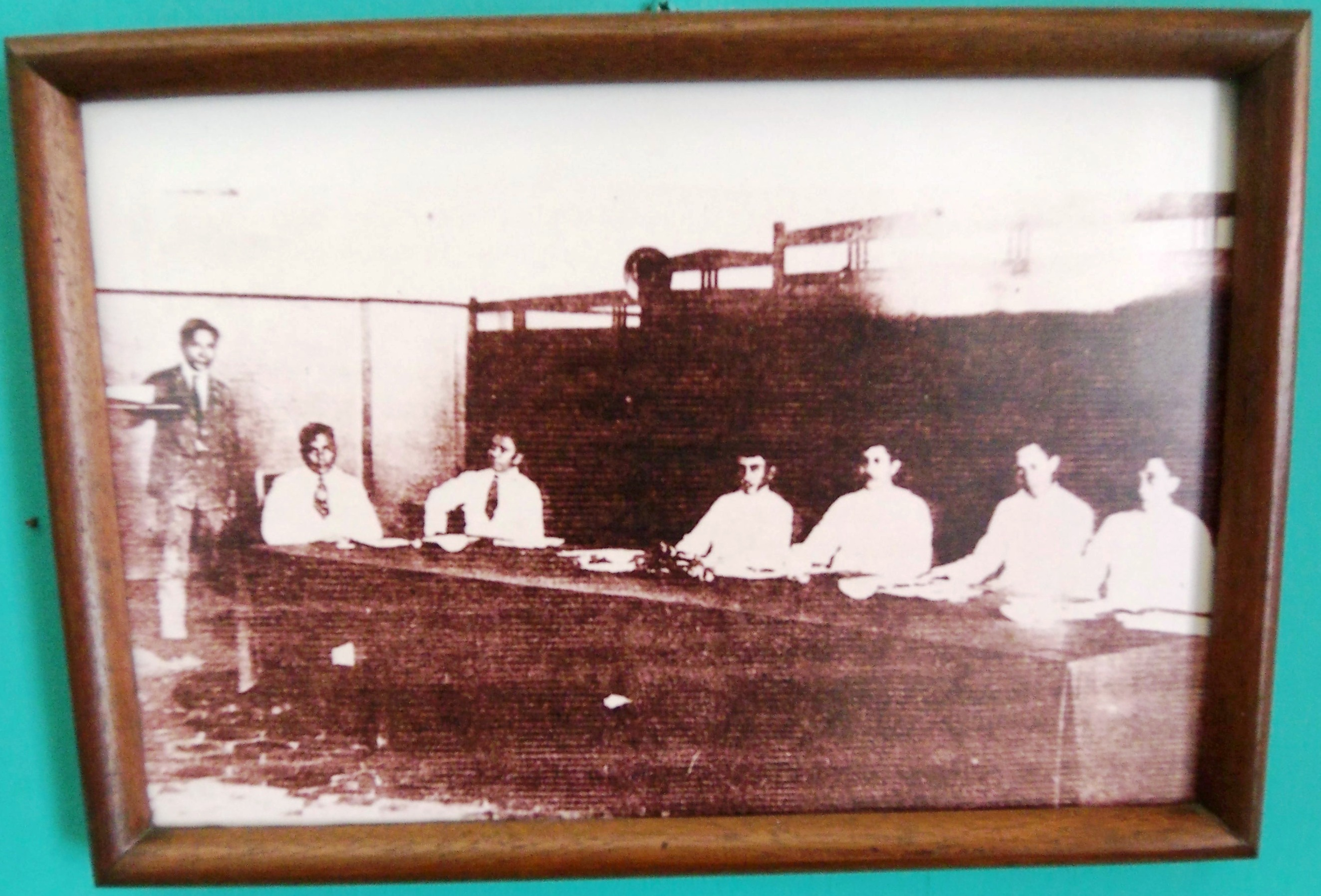
Perserikatan Minahasa

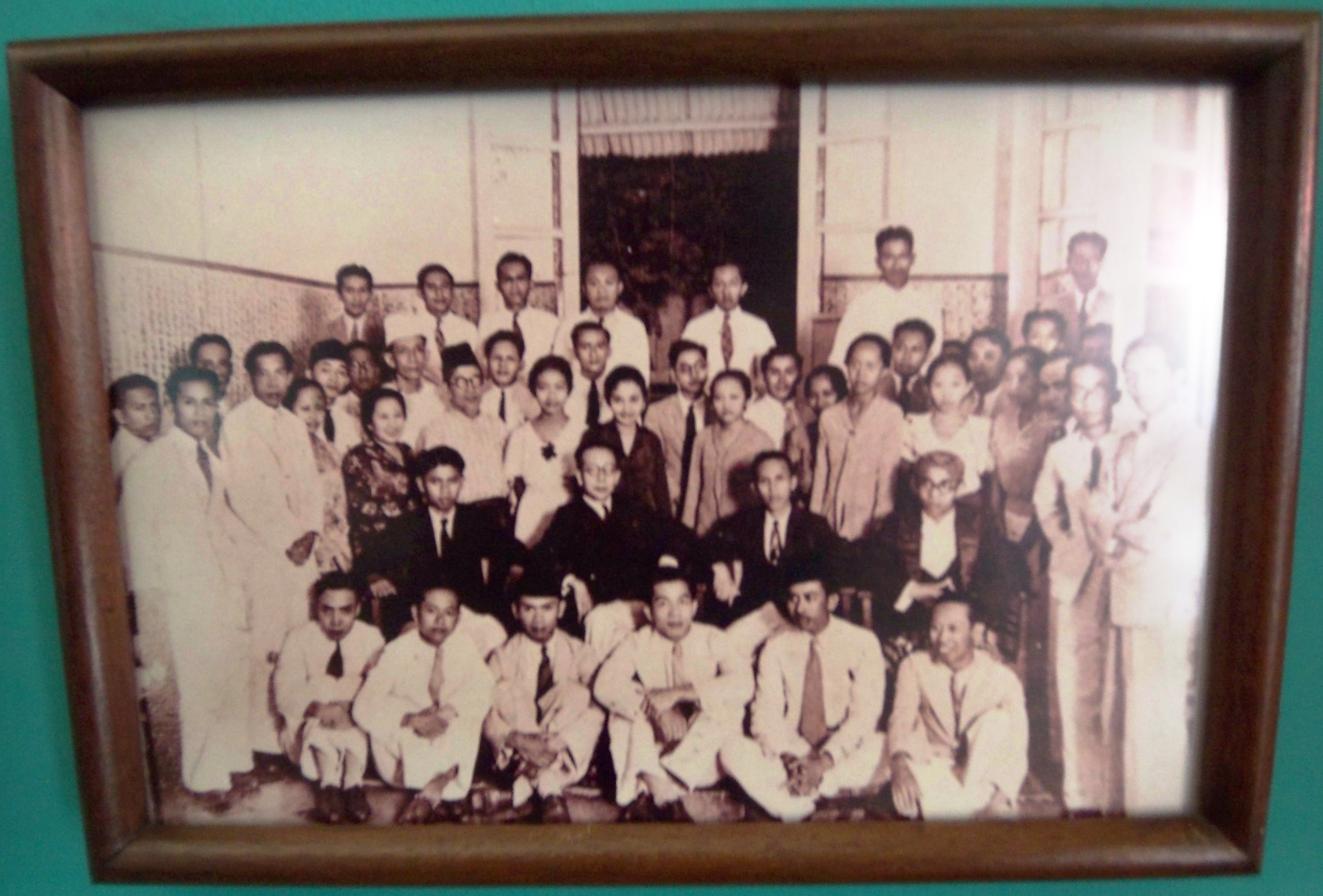
Perhimpunan Pelajar-Pelajar Indonesia

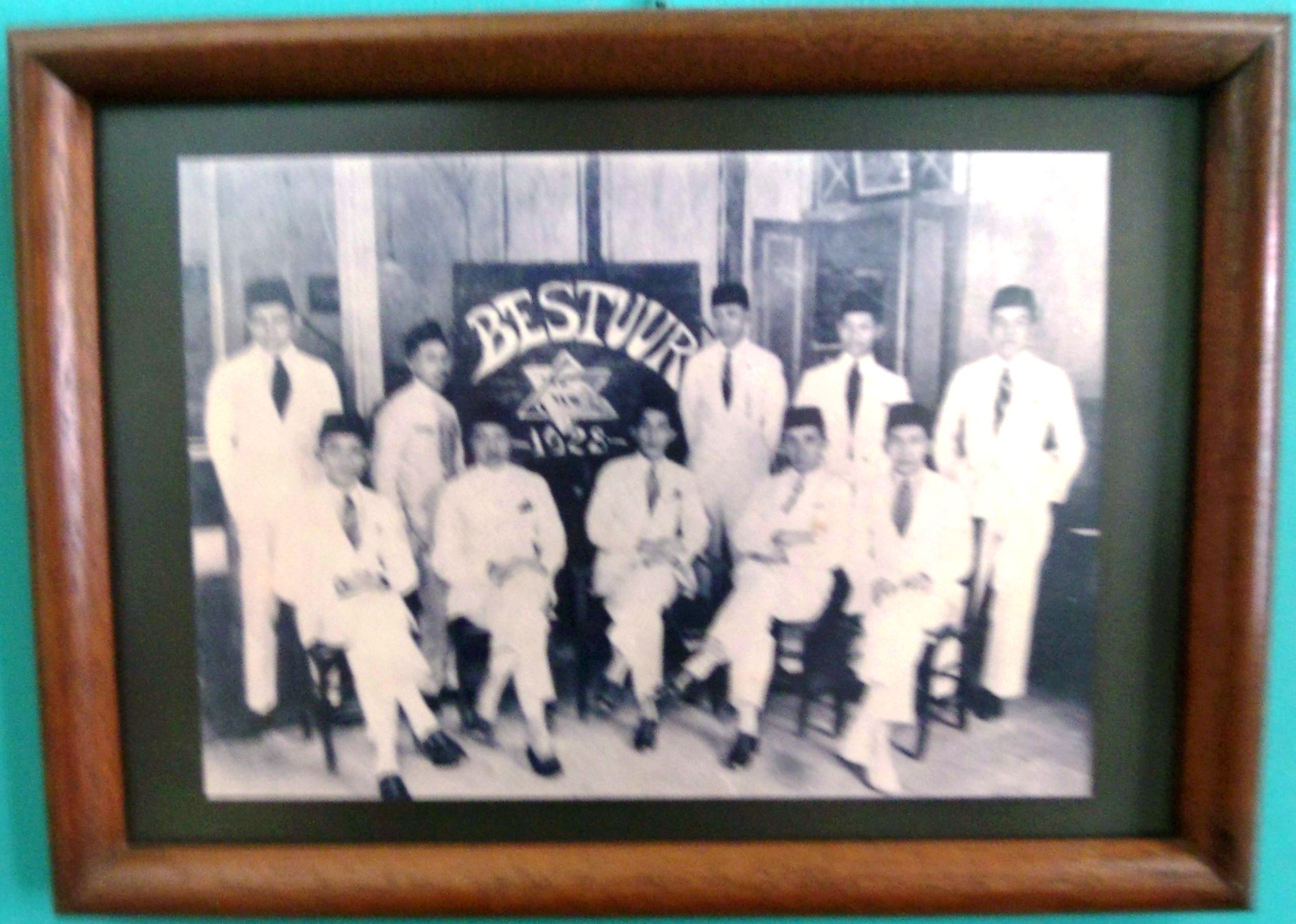
Pemuda Kaum Betawi

==== Kongres Pemuda Indonesia Pertama Room ====
From the room above, we can enter directly into this room next to each other. In this room exhibits collections relating to the First Indonesian Youth Congress, such as:

- Participant photo of Kongres Pemuda Indonesia Pertama
- Photo of activity during Kongres Pemuda Indonesia Pertama
- Perhimpunan Pelajar-Pelajar Indonesia
- Partai Nasional Indonesia
- Speech footage at the time Kongres Pemuda Indonesia Pertama
- A red and white guide flag from 1928

==== Kongres Pemuda Indonesia Kedua Chamber ====
This chamber is located close to the exit of the room of Kongres Pemuda Indonesia Pertama.In this room it exhibits the collection which describes the event of Kongres Pemuda Indonesia Kedua, such as:

- Minirama of Kongres Pemuda Indonesia Kedua
- The atmosphere of third trial of the Kongres Pemuda Indonesia Kedua
- Wage Rudolf Soepratman's Violin
- The congressional committee and the verdict were announced by the Kongres Pemuda Indonesia Kedua

==== Indonesia Muda Room ====
In this room there are several collections related to the youth movement after the Youth Oath was made, such as:

- Vandel Indonesia Muda
- Photo of the big commission of Indonesia Muda
- Photos of the activities of Indonesia Muda

==== PPPI Room ====
This room presents several collections related to the Indonesian Student Association, after the Second Indonesian Youth Congress. This room also exhibits collections related to youth movements through political parties.

==== Thematic Room ====
This room consists of two rooms, located in the pavilion Building Kramat 106. This room presents several collections related to youth activities in 1945, 1966 and 1998.
