= Youth Pledge =

1928 declaration by Indonesian nationalists

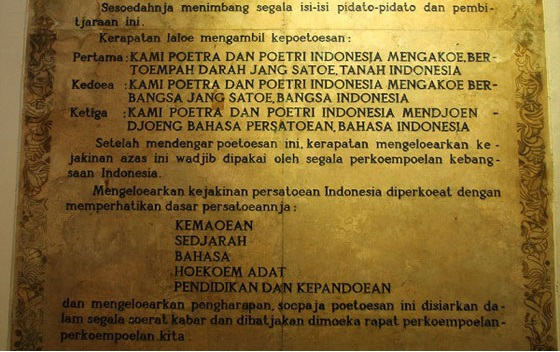
The youth pledge text

The Youth Pledge (Indonesian: Sumpah Pemuda, lit. 'Youth Oath'), officially titled as Decision of the Congress of Indonesian Youth (Indonesian: Putusan Kongres Pemuda-pemuda Indonesia, or Poetoesan Congres Pemoeda-pemoeda Indonesia in the original Van Ophuijsen spelling) is the nationalist pledge made by young Indonesians on 28 October 1928, which defined the identity of Indonesians. The decision proclaimed three ideas: one motherland, one nation, and a unifying language.

== Background ==
The first Indonesian youth congress was held in Batavia (now called Jakarta), the capital of the then-Dutch East Indies in 1926. It produced no formal decisions but did promote the idea of a united Indonesia. The dream of Indonesian independence inspired all Indonesian youth to unite their efforts in mobilizing youth organizations into one forum. At the time, the situation was tense since the Dutch colonial authority had just crushed the joint rebellion between communists and religious groups in Cilegon, Banten, and West Sumatra. Wage Rudolf Supratman, in preparation, composed and recorded the song "Indonesia" (prototype of "Indonesia Raya") with the help of Yo Kim Tjan, owner of Toko Populaire, a music store in Pasar Baru. This was after being rejected by Dutch-owned Firma Odeon and Tio Tek Hong, owner of a vinyl store in Pasar Baru, in fear of the Dutch authority. The music was recorded secretly in Yo Kim Tjan's house near Gunung Sahari Area in 1927.

In October 1928, the second Indonesian youth congress was held in three locations. The first session was held on 27 October 1928 in the Katholieke Jongelingenbond building, where hope was expressed for the congress to inspire the feeling of unity. The second session saw discussions about educational issues held in the Oost Java Bioscoop building. The third and final session on 28 October was held at Jalan Kramat Raya No, 106, which was a house owned by Sie Kong Lian. This event was closed by the hearing of the future Indonesian national anthem Indonesia Raya by Wage Rudolf Supratman played with violin, and sang by Haji Agus Salim's daughter, Theodora Atia "Dolly" Salim, but was modified slightly to not provoke Dutch authority.

The congress was closed with a reading of the youth pledge.

== The pledge ==
In Indonesian, with the original spelling, the pledge reads:

Pertama
Kami poetra dan poetri Indonesia, mengakoe bertoempah darah jang satoe, tanah air Indonesia.
Kedoea
Kami poetra dan poetri Indonesia, mengakoe berbangsa jang satoe, bangsa Indonesia.
Ketiga
Kami poetra dan poetri Indonesia, mendjoendjoeng bahasa persatoean, bahasa Indonesia.

In Indonesian with current spelling:

Pertama
Kami putra dan putri Indonesia, mengaku bertumpah darah yang satu, tanah air Indonesia.
Kedua
Kami putra dan putri Indonesia, mengaku berbangsa yang satu, bangsa Indonesia.
Ketiga
Kami putra dan putri Indonesia, menjunjung bahasa persatuan, bahasa Indonesia.

In English:

Firstly
We the sons and daughters of Indonesia, acknowledge one motherland, Indonesia.
Secondly
We the sons and daughters of Indonesia, acknowledge to be of one nation, the nation of Indonesia.
Thirdly
We the sons and daughters of Indonesia, uphold the language of unity, Indonesian language.

== First Congress of Indonesian Youth ==
- Chairman: Sugondo Djojopuspito (Perhimpunan Pelajar-Pelajar Indonesia/PPPI)
- Vice Chairman: R.M. Djoko Marsaid (Jong Java)
- Secretary: Mohammad Yamin (Jong Soematranen Bond)
- Treasurer: Amir Sjarifuddin (Jong Batak Bond)
- Aide I: Johan Mohammad Cai (Jong Islamieten Bond)
- Aide II: R. Katjasoengkana (Pemoeda Indonesia)
- Aide III: R.C.I. Sendoek (Jong Celebes)
- Aide IV: Johannes Leimena (Jong Ambon)
- Aide V: Mohammad Rochjani Su'ud (Pemoeda Kaoem Betawi)

== Original Draft ==
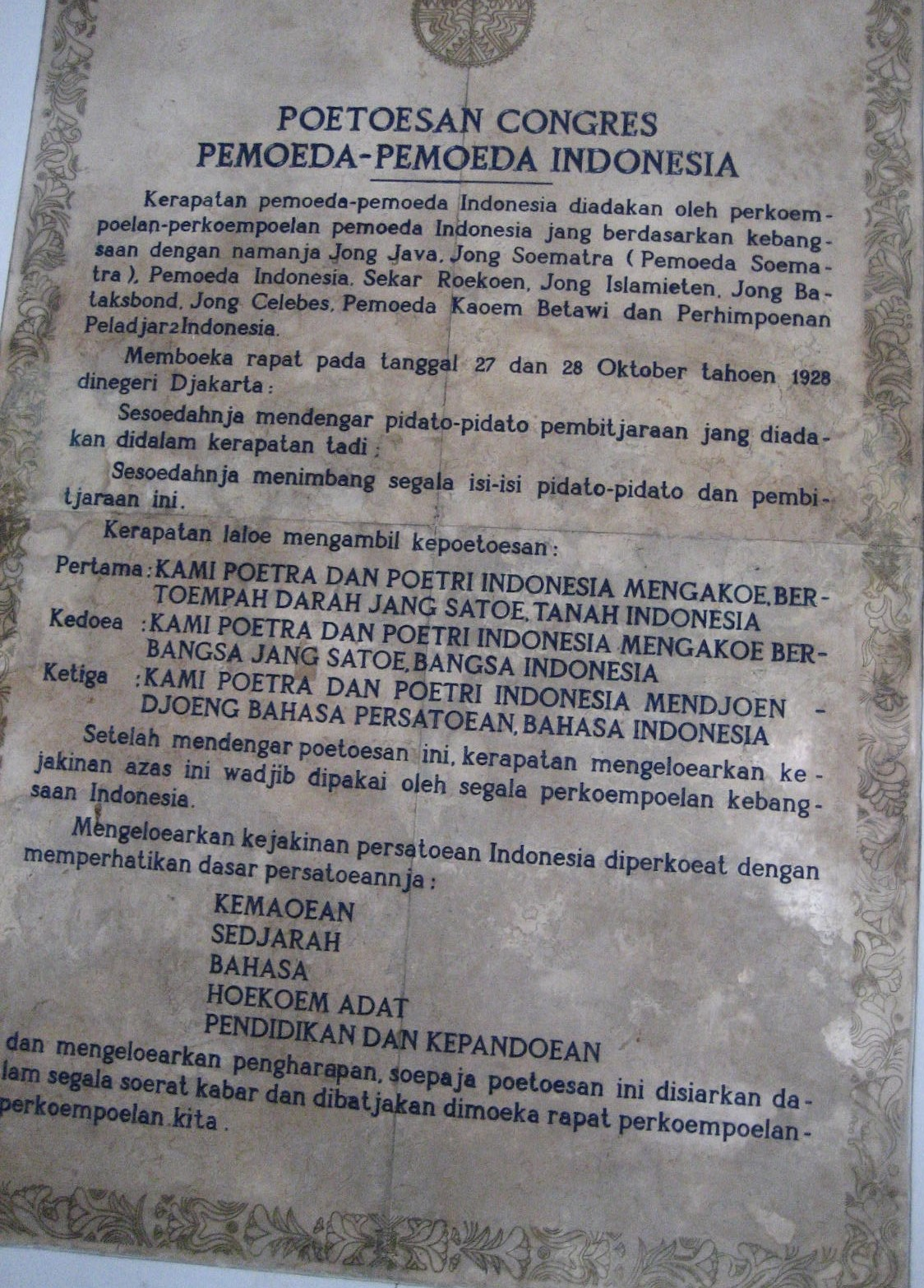
Historical Indonesian Youth Pledge, Sumpah Pemuda in 1928

The Youth Pledge is a commitment by Indonesian youth from various ethnic groups to unite in Indonesia. However, it turns out that the original script of the Youth Pledge did not mention the Indonesian language but instead referred to Malay.

In the First Indonesian Youth Congress, the proposal for the original Youth Pledge was formulated by Mohammad Yamin.

In Indonesian, with the original spelling, the draft pledge reads:

Pertama
Kami poetra dan poetri Indonesia, mengakoe bertoempah darah jang satoe, tanah air Indonesia.
Kedoea
Kami poetra dan poetri Indonesia, mengakoe berbangsa jang satoe, bangsa Indonesia.
Ketiga
Kami poetra dan poetri Indonesia, mendjoendjoeng bahasa persatoean, bahasa Melajoe.

In English:

Firstly
We the sons and daughters of Indonesia, acknowledge one motherland, Indonesia.
Secondly
We the sons and daughters of Indonesia, acknowledge to be of one nation, the nation of Indonesia.
Thirdly
We the sons and daughters of Indonesia, uphold the language of unity, Malay.

However, the original Youth Pledge sparked a debate. Mohammad Tabrani objected to the third paragraph of the original Youth Pledge, which used Malay. According to him, Malay should be replaced with Indonesian so that the entire formulation includes the name Indonesia at the end.

This debate inevitably led to changes in the wording of the original Youth Pledge. However, initially, there was no agreement on the change of formulation.

Therefore, the proposal for Mohammad Yamin's proposal for the original Youth Pledge was submitted again at the Second Indonesian Youth Congress. The congress took place from 27 to 28 October 1928, in Jakarta. The Second Youth Congress resulted in the Youth Pledge that we still hear today and marked the birth of Indonesian language.

== National Day ==
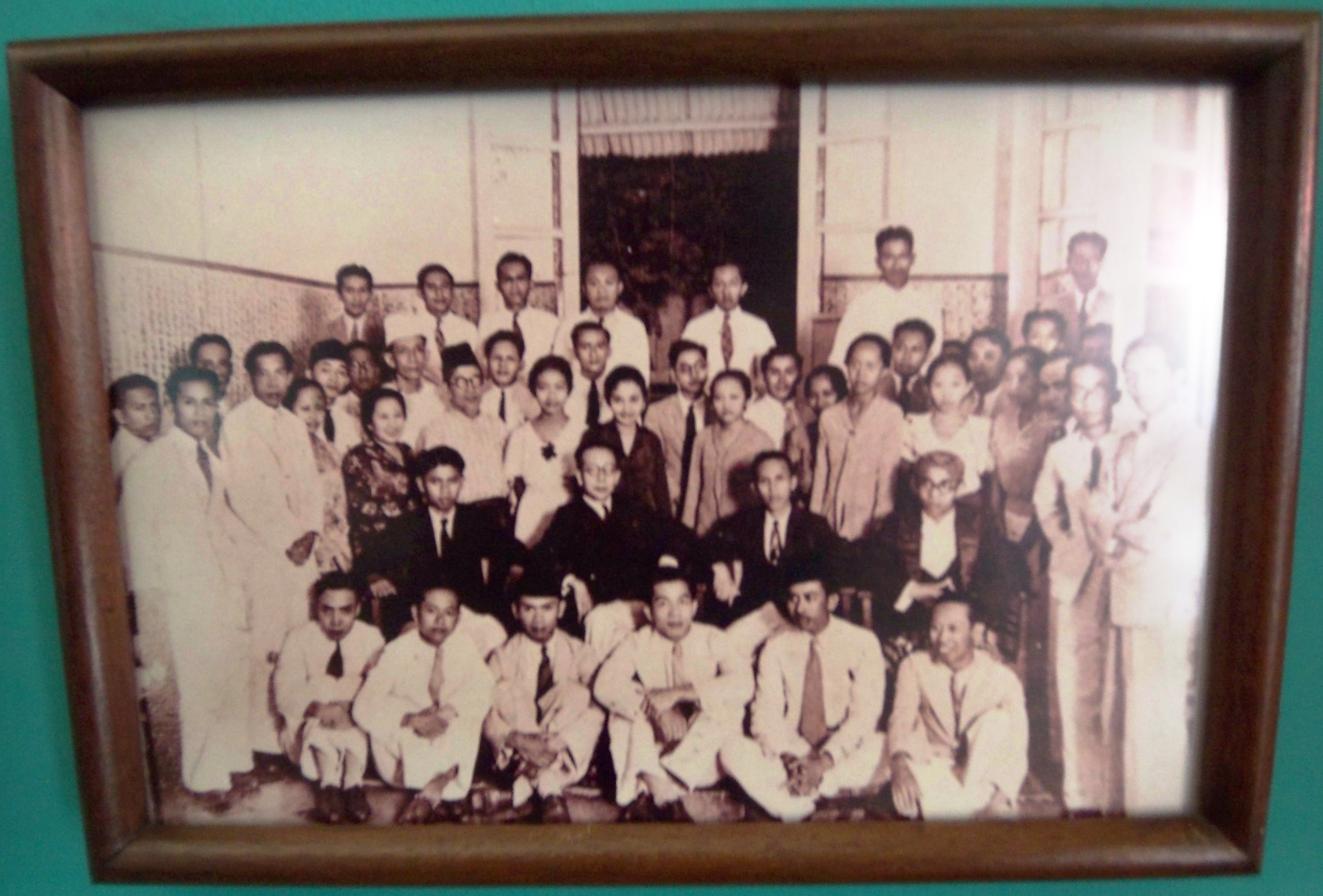
Association of Indonesian Students (Indonesian: Perhimpunan Pelajar-pelajar Indonesia, PPPI) delegation.

As of Presidential Decree No. 316 of 1959 dated December 16, 1959, 28 October became non-holiday national day.

== See also ==
- Youth Pledge Museum
