= Wisaksono =

Wisaksono is a masculine given name and a surname. Notable people with the name include:

- Vincentius Sutikno Wisaksono (1953–2023), Indonesian bishop
- Wisaksono Wirjodihardjo (1899–1984), Indonesian politician
