= Abdoel Gaffar Pringgodigdo =

Minister of Justice of Indonesia

Prof. Dr. Mr. Abdoel Gaffar Pringgodigdo
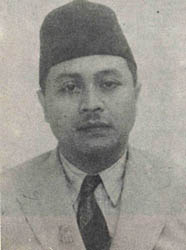
- Abdoel Gaffar Pringgodigdo, c. 1950

Minister of Justice
- In office 21 January 1950 – 6 September 1950
- President: Sukarno
- Preceded by: Soepomo
- Succeeded by: Wongsonegoro

Personal details
- Born: 24 August 1904 Bojonegoro, Dutch East Indies
- Died: 1988 (aged 83–84)
- Citizenship: Indonesia
- Party: Masyumi

Prof. Mr. Abdoel Gaffar Pringgodigdo (24 August 1904 – 1988) was the Minister of Justice of Indonesia from 21 January to 6 September 1950.

== Biography ==
Pringgodigdo was born in Bojonegoro, East Java, Dutch East Indies on 24 August 1904. He was the older brother of diplomat Abdoel Kareem Pringgodigdo. After two years of elementary school, he studied at a Europeesche Lagere School from 1911 to 1918, then at the Hogere Burger School. After graduating in 1923, he went to Leiden, Netherlands, to study at Leiden University, where he graduated in 1927 with a law degree. He also received a cum laude degree in Indoloogie, the study of the Dutch East Indies.

After returning to Indonesia, Pringgodigdo took a job as a scribe (Dutch: sekretaris), later becoming the leader (Indonesian: wedana) of Karang Kobar in the eastern part of Purbalingga Regency. Towards the end of the Japanese occupation of the Dutch East Indies, Pringgodigdo served on the Committee for Preparatory Work for Indonesian Independence as secretary for Radjiman Widyoningrat, chair of the committee. He was also part of the Committee of Five (Panitia Lima) responsible for formulating the state philosophy, Pancasila.

Once Indonesia became independent, Pringgodigdo served as state secretary under President Sukarno until January 1950; from June to September 1948 he also served as the commissioner for Sumatra. After the Dutch seized Yogyakarta in December 1948, Pringgodigdo was captured and flown to Bangka with other Indonesian leaders; he also reported that large parts of his archives were burned. From 21 January to 6 September 1950, he served as Minister of Justice, representing the Masyumi Party.

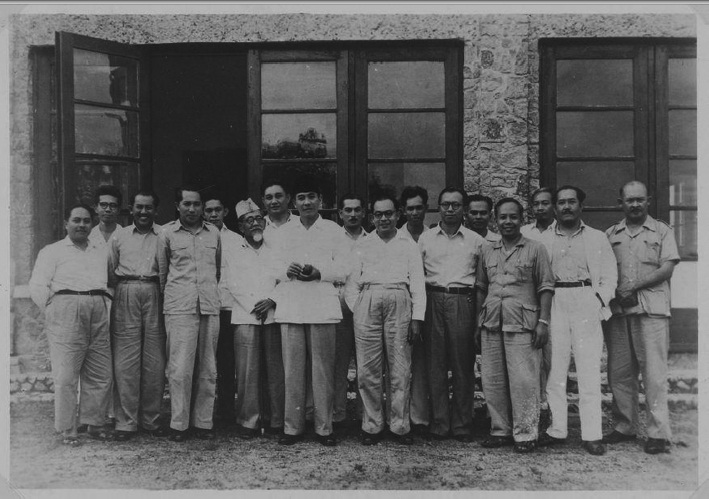
Pringgodigdo (far left) with other leaders in Bangka in 1949

After retiring from politics, Pringgodigdo began teaching. He began as a guest lecturer on law at Gadjah Mada University, later moving to Surabaya and teaching at Airlangga University. At Airlangga, he served as the first Dean of Law from 1953 to 1954, later serving as the university's president from November 1954 to September 1961. After a brief period as acting president at Hasanuddin University in Ujung Pandang, he returned to Surabaya and taught at the Surabaya State Teachers College. He later founded the Institute of Legal Theory in Surabaya with Kho Siok Hie and Oey Pek Hong. The institute was merged into the Faculty of Law at Airlangga University sometime later.

In 1971 he became a member of the People's Representative Council.

== Personal life ==
Pringgodigdo was married to Nawang Hindrati Joyo Adiningrat.

Political offices
Preceded by Established	State Secretary; 19 August 1945 – 14 November 1945	Succeeded by Mohammad Ichsan and Abdul Wahab Surjodiningrat
