= Soepomo =

Indonesian politician, lawyer, and diplomat (1903–1958)

Raden Soepomo
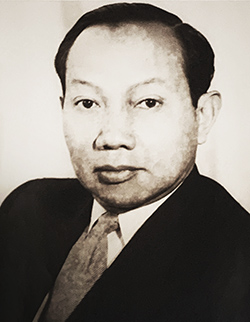
- Official portrait, c. 1954

2nd Ambassador of Indonesia to the United Kingdom
- In office 1954–1956
- Preceded by: Subandrio
- Succeeded by: Soenario

1st Minister of Justice
- In office 20 December 1949 – 6 September 1950
- Preceded by: Susanto Tirtoprodjo
- Succeeded by: A. G. Pringgodigdo
- In office 19 August 1945 – 14 November 1945
- Preceded by: Office established
- Succeeded by: Raden Soewandi

2nd President of the University of Indonesia
- In office 1951–1954
- Vice President: Wisaksono Wirjodihardjo
- Preceded by: Susanto Tirtoprodjo
- Succeeded by: A. G. Pringgodigdo

Personal details
- Born: 22 January 1903 Sukoharjo, Dutch East Indies
- Died: 12 September 1958 (aged 55) Jakarta, Indonesia
- Party: Independent
- Education: Leiden University (Mr.)
- Occupation: Politician; lawyer; diplomat

Soepomo (EYD: Supomo; 22 January 1903 – 12 September 1958) was an Indonesian politician and lawyer who served as the country's first Minister of Justice from August until November 1945 and again from December 1949 until 6 September 1950. Known as the father of Indonesia's constitution, he was posthumously declared an Indonesian National Hero by President Sukarno in 1965.

== Early life and education ==
Soepomo was born on 22 January 1903, in Sukoharjo, Dutch East Indies (now Indonesia). He came from a noble family; his maternal and paternal grandfathers were both high-ranking government officials. He began his education in 1917 when he was enrolled at a Europeesche Lagere School (ELS) in Boyolali. He graduated in 1920 and continued his studies at Meer Uitgebreid Lager Onderwijs (MULO) in Surakarta. In 1923, he moved to Batavia (now Jakarta) and attended the Rechts Hogeschool (RHS). After graduating from RHS, he took a job at a court in Surakarta, before leaving for the Netherlands to pursue further education. In the Netherlands, he enrolled at Leiden University and studied law under Cornelis van Vollenhoven.

He graduated in 1927, with his thesis, entitled "Agrarian System Reform in the Surakarta Area", (Note: Original: "Reorganisatie van het Agrarisch Stelsel in het Gewest Soerakarta") containing both a description of the agrarian system in Surakarta and veiled critiques of Dutch colonialism. When he returned home, he became a court employee in Yogyakarta, later being transferred to the Justice Department in Batavia. While serving at the Justice Department, he took a side job as a guest lecturer at the RHS. He then joined the Jong Java youth association and wrote a paper entitled "Indonesian Women in Law", (Note: Original: "Perempuan Indonesia dalam Hukum") which he presented together with future Prime Minister Ali Sastroamidjojo at the 1928 Women's Congress.

== Promulgation of the constitution ==
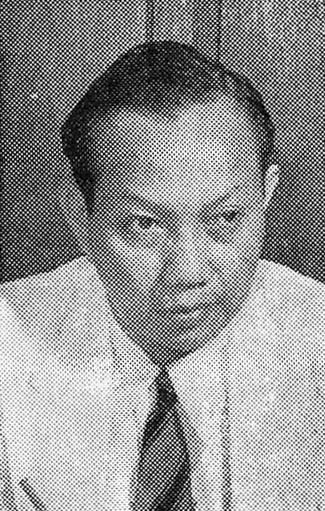
Photograph of Soepomo, c. 1954

On 1 March 1945, the final year of the Japanese occupation of the Dutch East Indies, the Japanese administration established the Investigating Committee for Preparatory Work for Independence (BPUPK) on 1 March 1945 to work on "preparations for independence in the region of the government of this island of Java". Soepomo became one of the 62 members. In the first session, which lasted from 29 May to 1 June, he expressed support for the future of Indonesia to be a strong unitary state, arguing that it was by Indonesian societal norms. He also spoke out against the idea of an Islamic state. On 1 June 1945, future president Sukarno made a speech, in which he outlined the future basis of the state, the five-element Pancasila. During the BPUPK recess, this was subsequently incorporated into a preamble for the future constitution, the Jakarta Charter by a Committee of Nine, which did not include Soepomo.

When the BPUPK reconvened for its second session, which began on 10 July, a 19-member committee was set up to produce a draft constitution, and Soepomo played the dominant role in its deliberations, which took place over three days. He deliberately produced a constitution that had a strong central government with power concentrated with the president, and without a clear system of checks and balances, in line with his opinions. Specifically, he supported integralist totalitarianism based on the family ideology and proposed the Indonesian state be modelled on Nazi Germany and Imperial Japan.

He believed this system would avoid conflicts of interest between the government and the people. In the discussions, he was strongly opposed by Mohammad Yamin, who called for a more Western-style democracy with guarantees for human rights. Future vice-president Hatta also wanted a bill of rights to be included, but Sukarno sided with Soepomo. The compromise reached Article 28, which stated that human rights would be regulated by law. After heated discussions, particularly over the role of religion in the news state, the draft constitution and preamble were accepted on 16 July. Following the surrender of Japan, on 17 August 1945, Sukarno and Hatta proclaimed Indonesian independence. The following day, the Preparatory Committee for Indonesian Independence (PPKI), which had been formed on 7 August, met and approved the draft constitution produced by the BPUPK committee. The constitution also had an elucidation providing further information about the preamble and body, which was also written by Soepomo. As this was not a product of the BPUPK or the PPKI, its legal status was uncertain.

== Post-independence career ==
After his terms as Minister of Justice, Soepomo became a lecturer at Gadjah Mada University, as well as the Jakarta Police Academy. He was also President of the University of Indonesia. From 1954 to 1956, Soepomo was Indonesia's ambassador to the United Kingdom. Soepomo died in Surakarta on 12 September 1958. On 14 May 1965, Soepomo was posthumously declared an Indonesian National Hero by President Sukarno.

== Footnotes ==
Diplomatic posts
Preceded by Subandrio	Ambassador of Indonesia to the United Kingdom; 1954–1956	Succeeded by Soenario
