= Umarjadi Njotowijono =

Indonesian diplomat

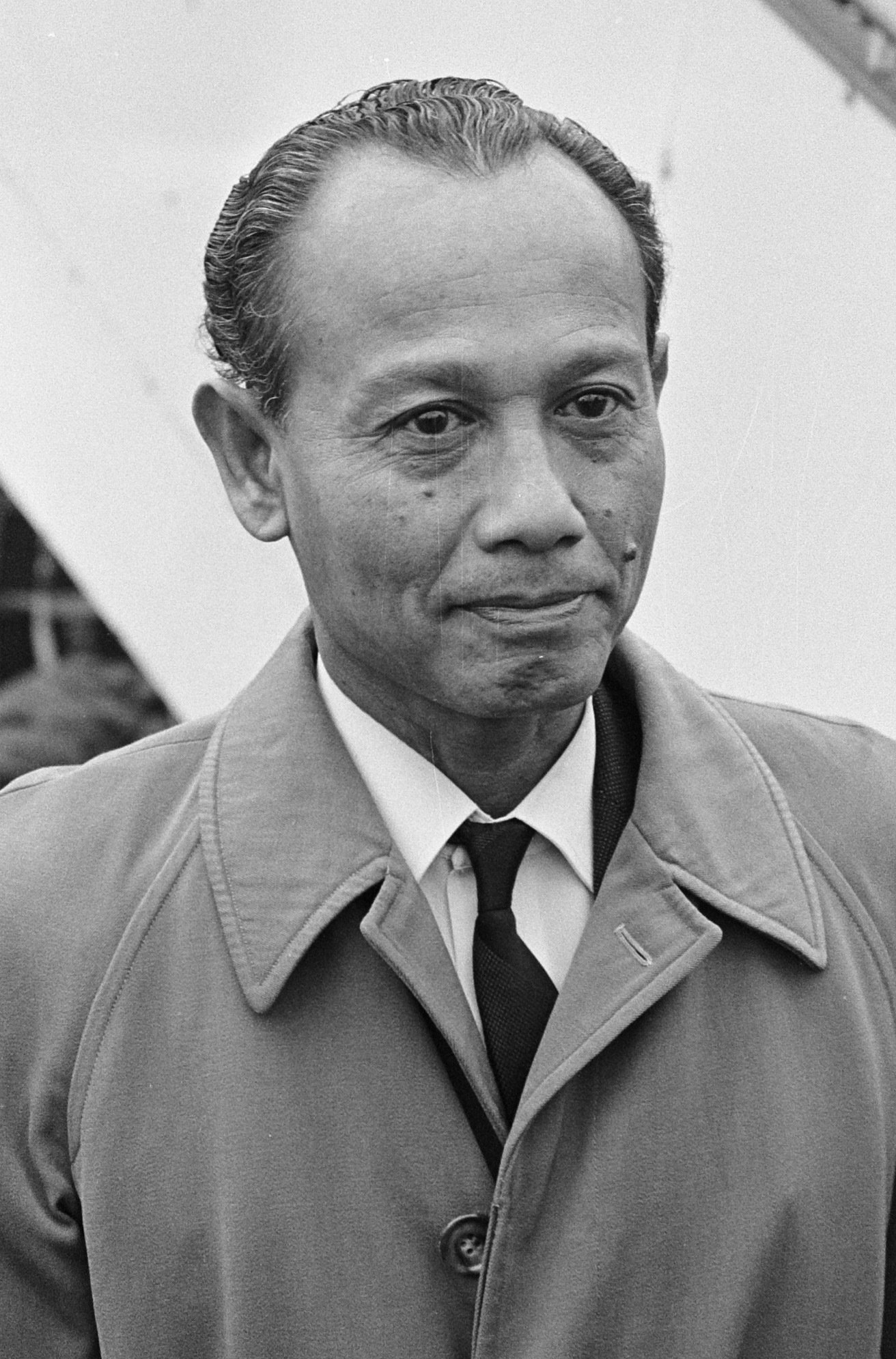
- Njotowijono in 1966

2nd Secretary-General of ASEAN
- In office 18 February 1978 – 11 July 1978
- Preceded by: Hartono Rekso Dharsono
- Succeeded by: Ali Abdullah

Secretary-General of the National ASEAN Secretariat of Indonesia (Note: Temporarily deputized by Janwar Marah Djani during his tenure as ASEAN Secretary General)
- In office 30 November 1972 – 30 December 1980
- Preceded by: Rukminto Hendraningrat
- Succeeded by: Atmono Suryo

Permanent Representative of Indonesia to the United Nations in Geneva
- In office 13 May 1967 – June 1971
- Preceded by: Office established
- Succeeded by: Ismael Thajeb

Assistant Foreign Minister for Foreign Economic Relations (Note: As deputy minister from March to August 1966)
- In office 8 September 1963 – 4 August 1966
- Minister: Subandrio; Adam Malik
- Preceded by: Office established
- Succeeded by: Ismael Thajeb (as Director-General)

Personal details
- Born: 2 September 1910 Purwodadi, Madiun Regency, Dutch East Indies
- Died: 2012 (aged 101–102)
- Spouse: Setsoko (m. 1941)
- Relations: Sukarjo Wiryopranoto (brother-in-law)
- Children: 5
- Education: Tokyo University of Commerce

Umarjadi Njotowijono (2 September 1910 – 2012) was an Indonesian diplomat who was known for his role as the Secretary-General of ASEAN for several months in 1978. A career diplomat, Umarjadi had served in various diplomatic postings, including a stint as the assistant, and later, deputy minister for foreign economic relations, permanent representative to the United Nations in Geneva, and secretary general of Indonesia's national ASEAN secretariat.

== Early life and education ==
Umarjadi was born on 2 September 1910 in Purwodadi, a village in the Madiun Regency (now Magetan Regency), as the son of Raden Njotowijono, who was better known by the nickname Mbah Mantri amongst the villagers. Njotowijono's brother, Oemar Sahid, was the police chief in the Emergency Government of the Republic of Indonesia, while his sister, Oemarjam Njotowijono, was married to Sukarjo Wiryopranoto, an Indonesian politician and diplomat who would later become a national hero. He completed his primary education at the Purwodadi's People School (equivalent to elementary school).

Upon finishing high school in Yogyakarta in 1930, Umarjadi initially wanted to apply for a scholarship from the Dutch colonial government, but was unable to as his academic scores were insufficient. Umarjadi then met Ki Hajar Dewantara, the founder of the Taman Siswa education movement, and was instructed by him to establish a Taman Siswa school in Medan, named Taman Dewasa. Among his students were Abdullah Kamil and B.M. Diah, both ambassadors to the U.N. He also opened Kleinambtenaars Examen, which prepared Indonesians for clerical duties in colonial government offices. After six years of working in Medan, Umarjadi was able to obtain a press card from the editor-in-chief of Pewarta Deli Djamaluddin Adinegoro and was able to save money to go for Penang. In Penang, Umarjadi managed to secure employment as a reporter in Tokyo from a Japanese news agency, and he departed for Japan on the same year.

After completing a Japanese language course at the ISI Japanese Language School, Umarjadi briefly attended the Sophia University before moving to study business at the Tokyo University of Commerce. To fund his studies, Umarjadi taught Indonesian at ISI. He stood out among his Indonesian peers and represented his colleagues in a survey on the view of Asian students conducted by the Kakushin magazine in September 1939. In his response, he referenced the Japanese invasion of China, remarking that the Chinese used to look up to Japan as liberators. He later became the leader of the Indonesian student union in the country, the Syarikat Indonesia, in late 1941 after his predecessor Sudjono returned to Jakarta as a translator for the Japanese military government. The union frequently met to discuss geopolitical issues regarding the impending invasion of the Dutch East Indies. Shortly before the invasion, Umarjadi on behalf of the union sent a message to Japan's prime minister and top military officials, expressing its desire for an independent Indonesia under Japan's leadership and offering a helping hand for the incoming occupation forces. As it become apparent that the Japanese were in no way granting autonomy to Indonesia, the union turned skeptical towards the Japanese government, with Umarjadi organizing rallies condemning the Japanese occupation as no different than that of the Dutch.

After the atomic bombings of Hiroshima and Nagasaki, Umarjadi took refuge in his Japanese wife's home village, as there were rumors of Tokyo being the next target. Umarjadi continued his political activism in the days following the proclamation of Indonesian Independence, and he took part in rallies condemning Dutch military operations in Indonesia, with the largest one being held in Hibiya Park in 1949, several days after Operation Kraai.

== Diplomatic career ==
Umarjadi returned to Indonesia after the Indonesian National Revolution ended in 1950, and he began working in the ministry of economic affairs, which was later reorganized into the ministry of welfare. Throughout his tenure, Umarjadi led trade negotiations with Poland, Japan, Singapore, and Romania. After five years in the ministry, in 1955 he was reassigned as a diplomat in the foreign ministry. Following a brief stint in the directorate of foreign economic relations, he went on a tour of duty as economic chief at the embassy in Rome (1955–1958) and Bonn (1958–1962). During his time in Rome, Umarjadi organized the Indonesian pavilion in the Mediterrano Fair in Palermo, while in Bonn Umarjadi became the embassy's chargé d'affaires ad interim during a period of ambassadorial vacancy.

=== Assistant and deputy minister ===
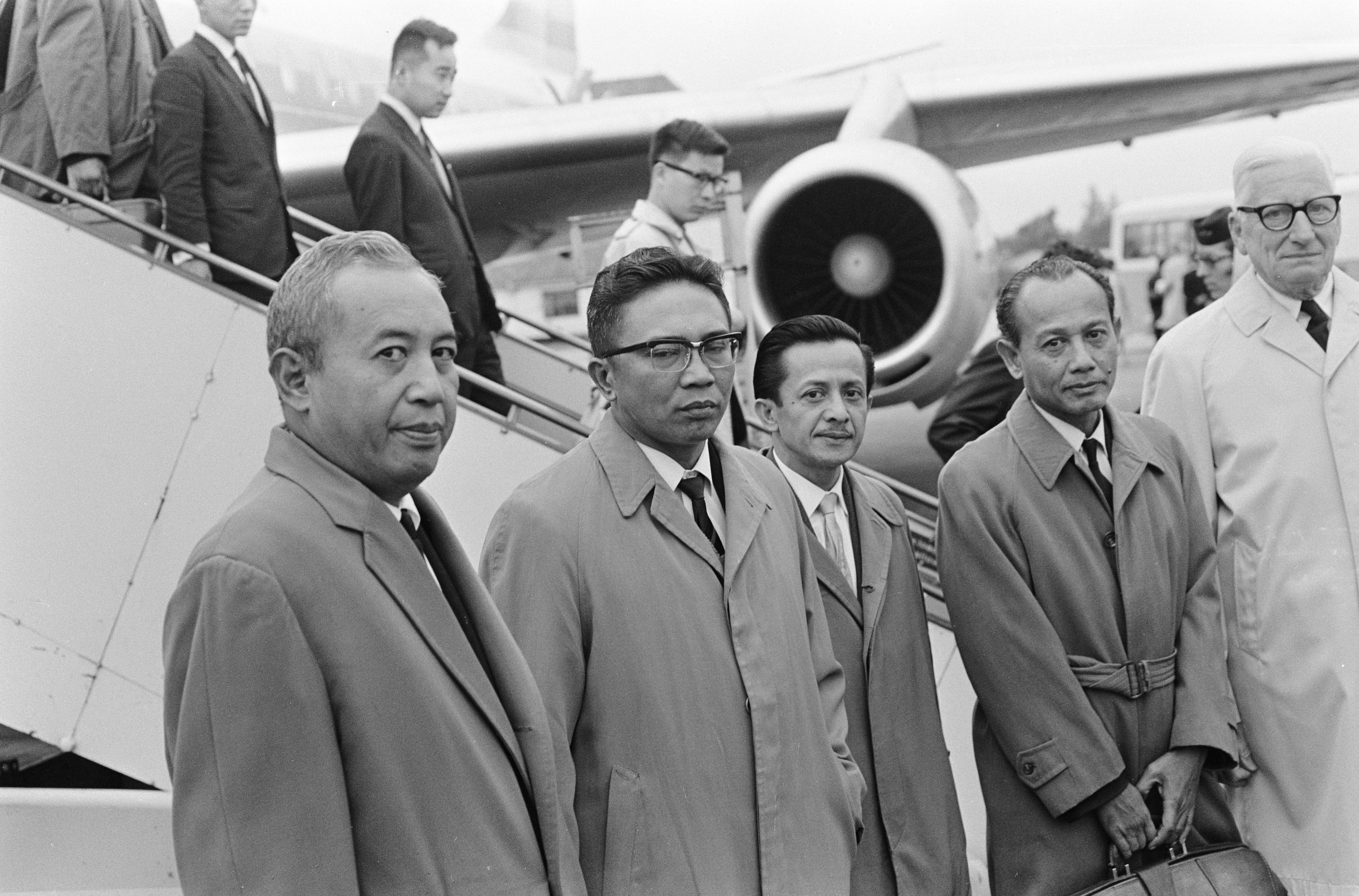
Umarjadi (second from right) with the Indonesian trade mission to the Netherlands, 1966.

After his overseas stint, on 8 January 1963 Umarjadi was installed as the assistant foreign minister for foreign economic relations. The post was created in light of restructuring within the foreign department, with the foreign minister overseeing four assistants, each being responsible for several closely related directorates. Umarjadi's appointment as assistant minister happened against a backdrop of the re-establishment of diplomatic relations between Indonesia and the Netherlands, which was marked with, among others, the signing of a technical cooperation treaty in 1964. Umarjadi worked closely with his counterpart Hein Roethof from the Dutch directorate of international technical assistance in implementing the treaty. By October that year, he led a mission to the Netherlands to finalize the establishment of a DAF automotive factory in Indonesia as well as transportation facility reparation and mining projects. The talks resulted in an agreement by the Netherlands government to provide a 100-million guilder export credit guarantee to Indonesia, signed by Umarjadi and Nico Blom, the official in charge of Indonesian affairs in the Netherlands foreign ministry. The agreement was later known as the Umarjadi-Blom treaty by the Dutch media.

On 30 March 1966, Umarjadi's status was upgraded to deputy minister, effectively making him a cabinet member. His cabinet-level position only lasted for a few months, as later on the same year the post was downgraded to the administrative level of director-general. Umarjadi did not continue his position and he was replaced by Ismael Thajeb. During his four-months long tenure as deputy minister, Umarjadi visited Japan and European countries such as the United Kingdom, Netherlands, West Germany, Italy, France, to negotiate Indonesia's past loans and secure a fresh set of aid. Foreign creditors viewed Indonesia's economic future as unconvincing, with West Germany being the only government to provide additional aid. In a statement to the United Press International, Umarjadi expected Indonesia's economy to not stabilize until three years and that it would start paying its debts in 1970.

=== Ambassador in Geneva ===
After his stint, he was appointed as the inaugural permanent representative of Indonesia to the United Nations in Geneva on 13 May 1967. Umarjadi represented Indonesia on a number of conference, including the investment conference for Indonesia held in Geneva in November 1967 and led the delegation to the debates organized by the UN Committee on the Peaceful Uses of the Seabed and the Ocean Floor (the "Seabed Committee") on 22 March 1971, in preparation for the-then upcoming Third UN Conference on the Law of the Sea. The delegation formally reintroduced and championed the concept of an "archipelagic state" to establish sovereign rights over the waters connecting Indonesia. Umarjadi stepped down from his ambassadorial role in light of his election as the chairman of the International Labour Organization on 24 June 1971 for a one-year term.

=== Role in ASEAN ===
Umarjadi returned for a domestic posting as the secretary general of Indonesia's national ASEAN secretariat, which he officially assumed on 30 November 1972. As Indonesia's top official for ASEAN matters, he the chair of ASEAN's first summit in Bali, which resulted in the declaration of ASEAN Concord. The declaration expanded ASEAN's cooperation in political matters and established a permanent secretariat for the organization.

In 1978, Umarjadi was tapped by the government to complete the remainder of the ASEAN secretary general's term Hartono Rekso Dharsono, who was pressured to resign after he fell from Suharto's favor for siding with the anti-Suharto student movements in the Bandung Institute of Technology. His duties as the head of Indonesia's national ASEAN secretariat was deputized to Janwar Marah Djani. According to political researcher Ronald M. Grant, the government's choice of Umarjadi, a bureaucrat, reflected its desire to utilize ASEAN as a tool for increasing regional trade.

Hartono's forced resignation triggered a discussion on the status of Indonesians working in ASEAN, which was resolved with an agreement on the relations between ASEAN and the Indonesian government, signed in April that year. During his tenure, discussions regarding the establishment of a joint ASEAN university was cancelled due to disagreements over the location. He served from 18 February until 11 July 1978, when he was replaced by Ali Abdullah from Malaysia. He completed his term as the secretary general of Indonesia's national ASEAN secretariat on 30 December 1980 and was replaced by Atmono Suryo.

== Personal life ==
Umarjadi was married to Setsoko, a Japanese woman whom he met in college, in 1941. The couple had four daughters and a son. Umarjadi died in 2012. His remains were interred at his family's cemetery in Purwodadi.
