= Ismael Thajeb =

Indonesian diplomat (1917–1983)

Teuku Mohamad Ismael Thajeb
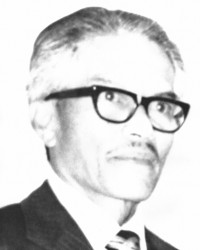

Permanent Representative of Indonesia to the United Nations in Geneva
- In office 1971–1975
- President: Suharto
- Minister: Adam Malik
- Preceded by: Umarjadi Njotowijono
- Succeeded by: Ali Alatas

Director General of Foreign Economic Relations
- In office 4 August 1966 – 6 September 1971
- President: Suharto
- Minister: Adam Malik
- Preceded by: Umarjadi Njotowijono
- Succeeded by: B. Sjahabuddin Arifin

Ambassador of Indonesia to Mexico
- In office 24 March 1961 – February 1967
- President: Sukarno
- Minister: Subandrio; Adam Malik
- Preceded by: Moekarto Notowidigdo (ambassador, concurrently accredited); Hadi Thayeb (resident chargé d'affaires)
- Succeeded by: Rusman Manhar Djajakusuma

Personal details
- Born: April 2, 1917 Batavia, Dutch East Indies
- Died: January 21, 1983 (aged 65)
- Education: Rechtshoogeschool te Batavia (Drs.)

Teuku Mohamad Ismael Thajeb (Note: Older publications wrote his name with accents as Teuku Mohamad Ismaël Thajéb .) (2 April 1917 – 21 January 1983) was an Indonesian diplomat who was known for holding various foreign economic related position in the foreign department. He was Indonesia's ambassador to Mexico from 1961 to 1966 and permanent representative to United Nations in Geneva from 1971 to 1975. Between his ambassadorial tenure he was the director general of foreign economic relations.

== Early life and education ==
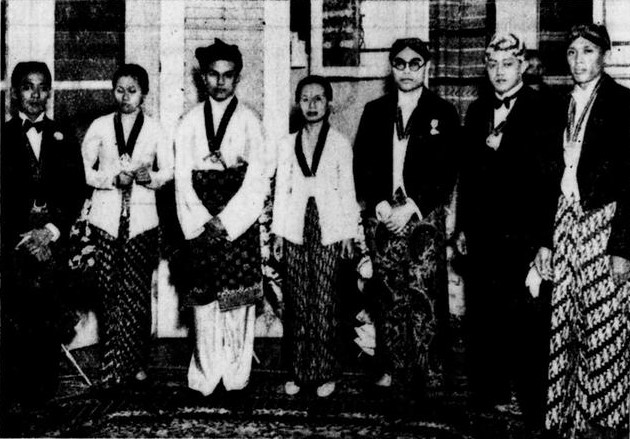
Ismael (third from left) with other Indonesian Students' Union board members, 1939.

Ismael Thajeb was born in Jakarta on 2 April 1917 as the second son of Teuku Tjhik (Chik) Hadji Mohammad Thayeb, an Acehnese aristocrat who was the uleebalang (chief) of Peureulak and, later, member of the Volksraad, and Raden Ayu Nurhamidah Prawirodirdjo, a Javanese aristocrat. All of Mohammad Thayeb's sons, including Ismael, were sent to study in Batavia. Similar to his career path, all of Ismael's brothers pursued a career in the diplomacy. His younger brother, Hadi Thayeb, was one of the founders of Indonesia's foreign department and went on to become ambassador in five different countries and a term as Aceh's governor, while his other brothers Syarief Thayeb becoming ambassador to the U.S. and holding several cabinet appointments, and Mochtar Thayeb becoming ambassador to Tunisia and ambassador to Ethiopia.

He completed his primary education at the Europeesche Lagere School (ELS) and at the Hogere Burgerschool (HBS), graduating in 1930 and 1935, respectively. He then studied law at Jakarta's Rechtshoogeschool (Law College) and received his meester in de rechten in 1940. As college student, Ismael was active in the Indonesian Students' Union (Unitas Studiosorum Indonesiensis), where he advanced from the organization's treasurer (1937–1938) to secretary (1938–1939), before becoming the organization's chairman from 1939 to 1940.

== Career ==
Ismael began his career in the Dutch civil service in August 1941. He was stationed in Bandung as a second-class civil servant of the Department of Economic Affairs in the division overseeing cooperatives and domestic trade in Bandung. After the Japanese occupation of the Dutch East Indies, on 10 October 1942 he was promoted as the head of the information office for cooperatives and domestic trade in Bandung. Aside from his civil service duties, he was a member of the board of supervisors of the Union of Indonesian Stores (Perwabi, Persatuan Warung Bangsa Indonesia). In 1944, Ismael was reassigned from Bandung to the Zinzika, the personnel section within the Soomubu (general department) of the Japanese military occupation government. Near the end of Japan's rule, Ismael attended an extended meeting organized by B.M. Diah to discuss the future of Indonesia's youth movement.

During the Indonesian National Revolution, Ismael was part of a mission sent by Indonesia's central republican order to ensure order in Sumatra in the wake of Sumatra's social revolution, a leftist led tumult which dismantled nearly all monarchies in Sumatra. After Indonesia obtained international recognition in 1950, Indonesia opened its embassy in partner countries, including the U.S. in Washington, D.C. Ismael was sent to the embassy as part of its first wave of diplomats, where he was in charge of commercial matters with the diplomatic rank of counsellor. Shortly after taking office, in October 1950 he briefly returned to Indonesia to conduct consultations with the central government, including economy minister Sumitro Djojohadikusumo.

As the embassy's commercial counsellor, Ismael took part in a trade conference organized by the Far East - American Council of Commerce and Industry in New York in 1950, the first commodity pooling conference—where he was part of the paper committee—and rubber conference in London in 1951, conference for tin producing countries in Washington on the same year, and the 6th session of the International Civil Aviation Organization Assembly in 1952. In a conference organized by the Far East American Council of Commerce and Industry in 1951, Ismael encouraged Western business magnate to invest in Indonesia and pledge the government's readiness for assistance, provided that the investment benefits both parties. Ismael also advised the Indonesian mission negotiating the U.S. government's tin purchase in 1952, explicitly denied rumors on the government's plan of nationalizing tin mines, mentioning the misreporting of the issue by newspapers. After Indonesian firms began ordering agricultural machineries on the same year, he travelled through the Southern United States along with the director of government agricultural estates Wisaksono Wirjodihardjo to observe mechanised agriculture. By 1954, Ismael was promoted as the embassy's economic minister, becoming the second most senior official in the embassy.

In early 1956, he was recalled back to Indonesia and appointed as the head of the directorate of foreign trade relations in the foreign ministry, which was a merger between the directorate of the same name in the economic ministry and the economic directorate in the foreign ministry. In his capacity, Ismael oversaw trade deals with Hungary, Turkey, and loans from West Germany. He also led negotiations with the Soviet Union, which secured an in-kind loan of $100 million dollars in the form of capital goods and machinery, as well as assistance in the development of atomic energy. He rejected the Soviet Union's proposal of purchasing Indonesia's rubber supply in a long-term period, stating that rubber purchases could only be made on an annual basis.

On 24 March 1961, Ismael was appointed as Indonesia's first resident ambassador to Mexico after a chargé-level relations for about a decade. He provided copies of his credentials to Mexico's foreign secretary Manuel Tello Baurraud on 5 April before presenting his credentials to president Adolfo López Mateos on 10 April 1961. A few months later, in September 1961 he was part of Indonesia's delegation to the 16th United Nations General Assembly.

In August 1966, he was appointed as the director general of foreign economic relations, and in February 1967 he was recalled from his ambassadorial post. Ismael played a role in strengthening economic relations with its former colonizers, the Netherlands and Japan, through investments. He led an economic mission to the Netherlands and renegotiated Indonesia's debt payment deadlines. He was replaced in his position by B. Sjahabuddin Arifin, the son of former parliament speaker Zainul Arifin, on 6 September 1971.

Thajeb was then named as Indonesia's permanent representative to Geneva on the same year, replacing veteran diplomat Umarjadi Njotowijono. He attended the 4th Non-Aligned Movement summit in Algiers in 1973 and, during his rotational chairmanship of the ASEAN Geneva Committee, represented the committee at the 6th Special Coordinating Committee of ASEAN Nations (SCCAN) session in Bandung. After retiring from the diplomatic service, he chaired the managing board of the Indonesian American Institute (Lembaga Indonesia Amerika, LIA) from 1977 to 1980, where he oversaw the institute's gradual independence from the U.S. embassy. Ismael died on 21 January 1983.

== Personal life ==
Ismael was married to Siti Sulatun, the daughter of Hamengkunegoro III. Hamengkunegoro III was the 20th out of Hamengkubuwono VII's 78 children, and the crown prince of the Yogyakarta Sultanate from 1902 until his death in 1913. The couple has three daughters and two sons.
