= Hartono Rekso Dharsono =

Indonesian general (1925–1996)

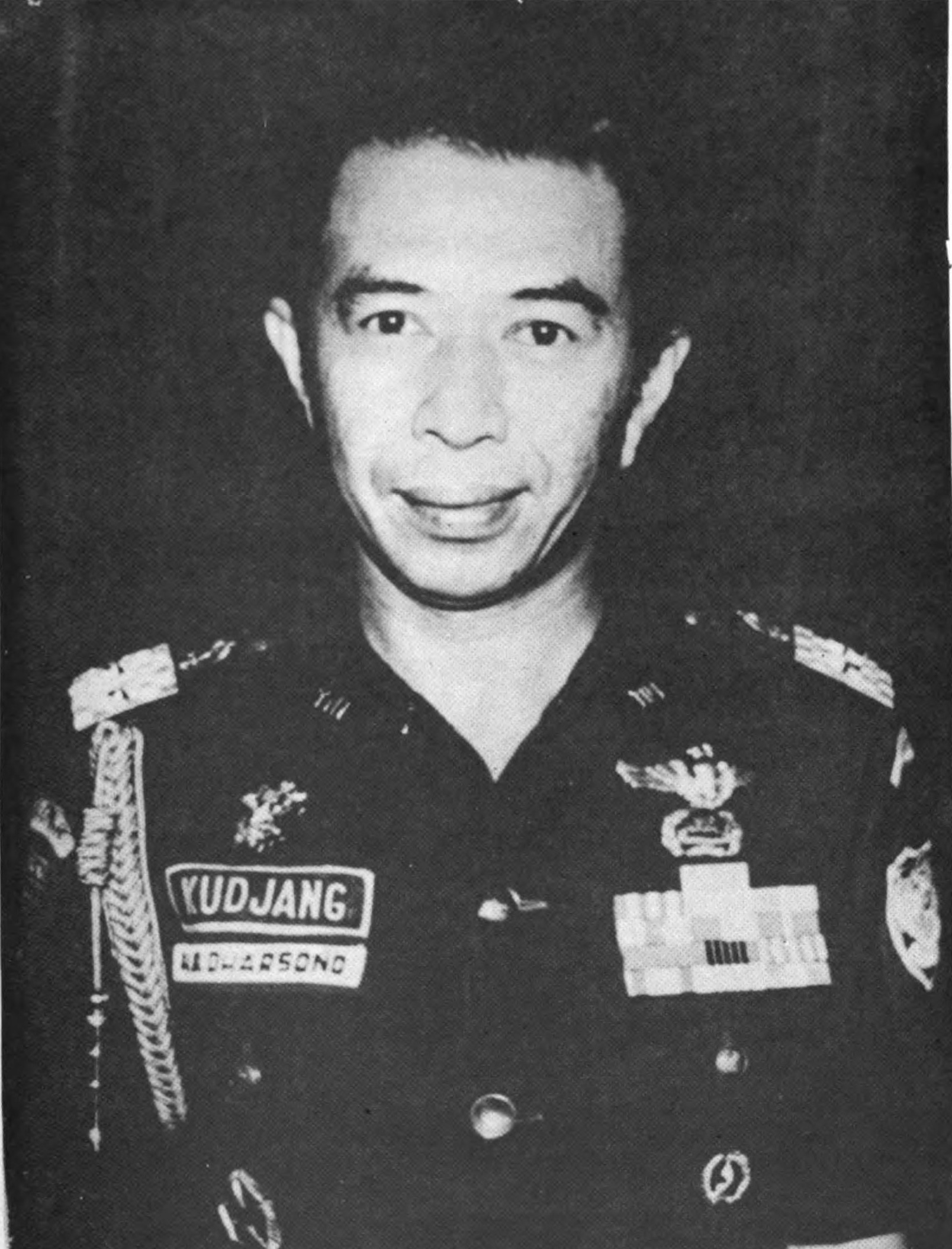

1st Secretary General of ASEAN
- In office 5 June 1976 – 18 February 1978
- Preceded by: Office established
- Succeeded by: Umarjadi Njotowijono

Personal details
- Born: 10 June 1925 Pacalongan, Central Java, Dutch East Indies
- Died: 5 June 1996 (aged 70) Bandung, West Java, Indonesia
- Education: Bandung Institute of Technology
- Occupation: Diplomat

Hartono Rekso Dharsono (10 June 1925 – 5 June 1996), often known as HR Dharsono, was a prominent general in the early years of General Suharto's New Order regime. He served as the first secretary-general of ASEAN. In his later years, he publicly opposed Suharto.

== Early life ==
Dharsono was born in Pekalongan, Central Java. He was the ninth child of Raden Prayitno Rekso, a civil servant working in the same town. After completing primary education in Pekalongan, Dharsono moved to Semarang and Jakarta for junior high school before going back to Semarang to complete high school. Unlike his contemporaries, Dharsono did not seem to have considered a military career at this point and went to Bandung to attend Technische Hogeschool, the precursor to the Bandung Institute of Technology (ITB).

== Military career ==
It was only after the Indonesian Declaration of Independence on 17 August 1945, that Dharsono joined Indonesia's then fledgling army. He enlisted with the Siliwangi Division, which was charged with the security of West Java and which was then commanded by Colonel Abdul Haris Nasution. During the Indonesian National Revolution, Dharsono partook in the Division's famous exploits, which included its 1948 long march from West Java to Central Java as a result of the Renville Agreement and its involvement in the crackdown on communists in Madiun, East Java. For his part, Dharsono showed himself to have some military talent, working his way up as he became Commanders of a squad, platoon, and battalion in turn.

Once Indonesia's Independence was recognized and KODAM VI/Siliwangi was back in West Java, Dharsono was made a Chief of Staff of the 23rd Brigade. In this position, Dharsono assisted in the efforts to defeat the Republic of South Molucca (RMS) separatist group. After he was finished as a Brigade Chief of Staff, Dharsono was sent to the Netherlands for further military education. Here, he attended the Hoogere Krijgsschool at The Hague.

Returning to Indonesia in 1954, Dharsono became a member of the Army General Staff and in 1956, he was transferred to Magelang to take on the position of Vice Governor of the National Military Academy. After serving in Magelang for 3 years, Dharsono finally returned Siliwangi to serve as the KODAM's Chief of Staff. In 1962, Dharsono went abroad again, this time to the United Kingdom as a military attache before returning in 1964 to once again serve as KODAM VI/Siliwangi Chief of Staff.

== Transition to New Order ==
It was during his second stint as Chief of Staff that the 30 September Movement (G30S) kidnapped 6 prominent Generals including Army Commander Ahmad Yani. Beforehand, the G30S Movement had approached KODAM VI/Siliwangi Commander Ibrahim Adjie and had gotten assurances for him that Siliwangi would remain neutral. However, Dharsono would take matters into his own hand on 1 October 1965. When Kostrad Commander Suharto decided to take control of the situation and move against what he perceived to be a coup attempt by the Communist Party of Indonesia (PKI), Dharsono decided to support him. Through unofficial channels, Dharsono told Suharto that he could use Siliwangi's Battalion 328 (Which was in Jakarta for the ABRI Day celebrations) against the G30S Movement. Suharto took up the opportunity, sending Battalion 328 in the operations to retake Halim Airbase.

Dharsono's support went unrewarded and when Suharto became Army Commander, Dharsono was appointed as a Personnel Assistant. There was a further reward in 1966 after Suharto received Supersemar (Order of the Eleventh of March)when Dharsono became Commander of KODAM VI/Siliwangi.

== New Order Radical ==
In August 1966, Suharto held a seminar for ABRI Officers and economists in Bandung, during which matters such as ABRI's involvement in politics and economic policy. One of the matters that came up was political parties and three approaches came up. The first approach was the status quo which will kept political parties as they are under the Sukarno era and the second approach was propagated by Suharto who wanted a reform of the political parties (Which he achieved when the number of political parties were reduced to just 3). The third and most drastic approach was taken by Dharsono who wanted political parties to be abolished altogether. Dharsono envisioned that in place of political parties, Parliamentary representatives are to be divided into two groups. One group would support the Government and the other would play the role of Opposition. He also envisioned that these groups would not be guided by any particular ideology but will base their policies on the New Order's principles of development and modernization. In promoting this approach, Dharsono was supported by Kemal Idris and Sarwo Edhie Wibowo and the three of them constituted a faction that was dubbed as "New Order Radicals". The New Order Radicals' approach was viewed with hostility by political parties who did not like the prospect of being removed from politics. Finally in early 1967, with debates on political parties going into a stalemate, Suharto decided to place priority on a Legislative Election bill.

The issue of political parties returned again in 1968 after Suharto was finally elected as president. Dharsono once again returned with his proposal although he made some modifications so that it was more moderate in nature. This time political parties would not be abolished, they would all merge into two bigger parties. One Party would become the Government Party while the other would become the Opposition Party. This time, Dharsono's idea was moderate enough that Suharto took interest to the idea, but Dharsono's failure to convince the political parties to merge meant the idea was once again discarded.

Finally, in 1969, Dharsono decided to discard his moderate approach, return to this original idea, and impose it by force on the Regional People's Representative Council (DPRD) in West Java. Suharto was not happy that Dharsono had gone off and done this. Dharsono was quickly discharged from ABRI and moved away from the central of power in Jakarta through an ambassadorship.

== Diplomatic career ==
After he was discharged from ABRI, Dharsono became Indonesia's Ambassador to Thailand. In 1972, Dharsono took on the Ambassadorship to Cambodia while concurrently serving as Head of the Indonesian delegation to the International Commission of Control and Supervision, (ICCS). Dharsono returned to Indonesia in 1975 to serve as an Expert on Indonesian Affairs for the Government.

In 1976, Dharsono was elected Secretary General of ASEAN but would not serve long due to domestic reasons. In early 1978, students from ITB published a pamphlet which in essence rejected Suharto's nomination for a third term as president. When Suharto chose to move against ITB by sending troops to the facility, Dharsono chose to speak in favor of the dissenting students. Suharto then took measures to have Dharsono removed as ASEAN Secretary General in February 1978.

== Opposition to New Order ==
After being removed from his position, Dharsono became Chairman of Propelat Corporation, a company with connections to KODAM VI/Siliwangi. At the same time, Dharsono also became Secretary General of the Army Study and Communications Forum (Fosko AD), a think tank set up by Army Chief of Staff Widodo for Army veterans to discuss the current political happenings. Like many others who joined the organization, Dharsono voiced criticism to Suharto for allowing ABRI to become partisan towards Golkar instead of being neutral. Suharto ordered Widodo to disband the group.

In 1980, Dharsono was linked with the Petition of 50, a group of prominent members of Indonesian society who criticized Suharto. For this Dharsono was forced to resign as Chairman of Propelat Corporation and he spent the next four years away from politics.

Dharsono made his return in September 1984 after the Tanjung Priok incident, during which ABRI led by Benny Moerdani and Try Sutrisno ordered a crackdown on Islamist protesters. Dharsono's involvement came when together with some Muslim leaders and some members of the Petition of 50 signed a statement questioning the Government's account of the incident, which seemed to have lowered the death toll of the protesters.

In October 1984, Dharsono was arrested on the charge that he was involved with a terrorist attack on a Bank Central Asia branch. In 1986, he was then sentenced to 10 years in prison which was reduced to 7 years after appeal. Dharsono served his sentence at Cipinang prison and was released in September 1990.

== Death ==
Dharsono developed respiratory problems while serving his sentence at Cipinang and as his health deteriorated, he also began suffering liver problems. Dharsono died on 5 June 1996.

== Notes ==
Political offices
Preceded by Office created	Secretary General of ASEAN; 1976-1978	Succeeded by Umarjadi Njotowijono
Incumbent
