= Wisaksono Wirjodihardjo =

Indonesian academician and politician (1899–1984)

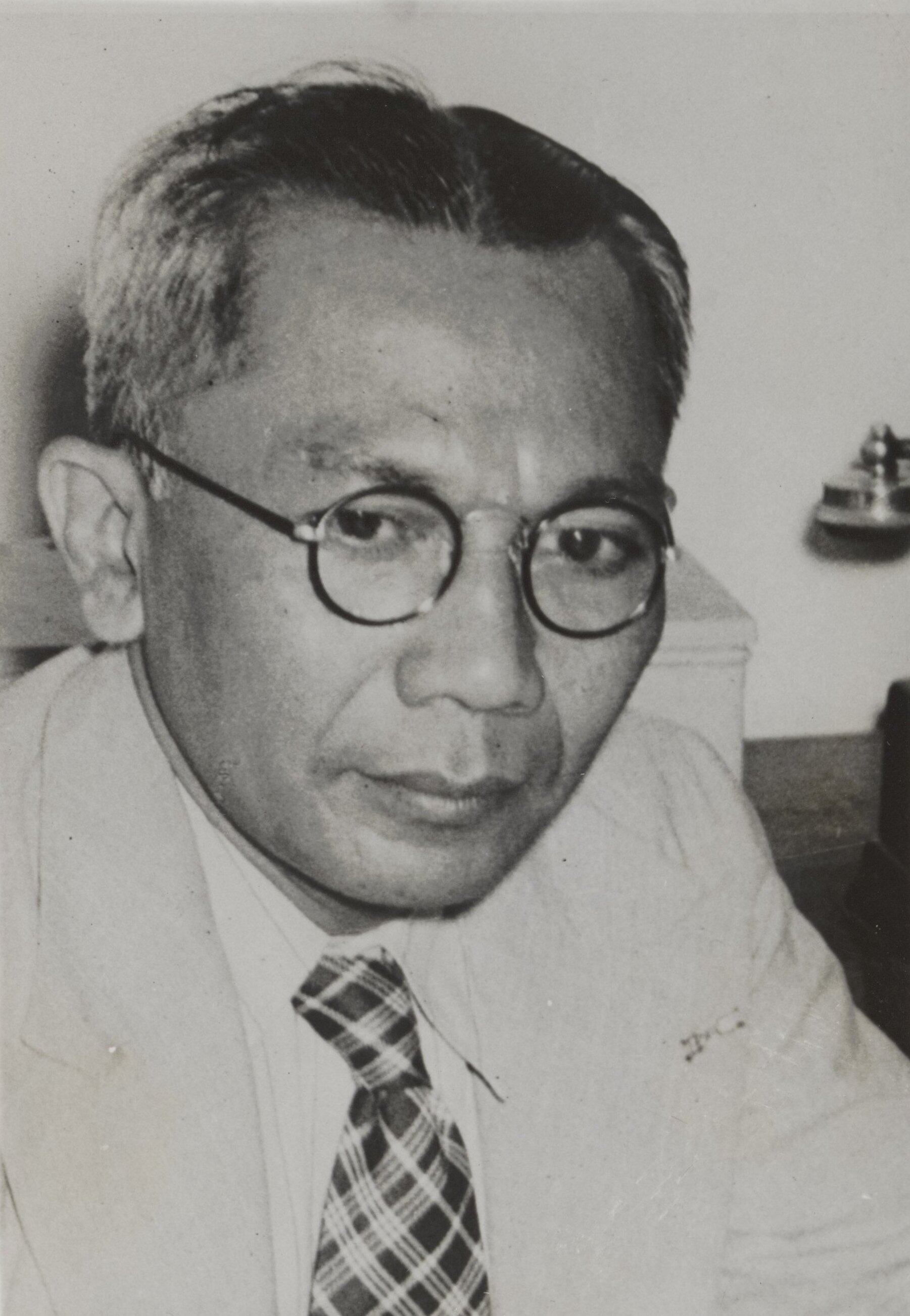

Vice President of the University of Indonesia
- In office 27 July 1951 – 1 October 1955
- Preceded by: office established
- Succeeded by: Slamet Iman Santoso

State Secretary for Agriculture and Fisheries
- In office 9 March 1948 – 27 December 1949
- Preceded by: office established
- Succeeded by: office dissolved handover to Djuanda Kartawidjaja, Minister of Economic Affairs

Mayor of Bogor
- In office 9 August 1947 – 13 February 1948
- Preceded by: Odang Prawiradipraja
- Succeeded by: J.J. Penoch

Personal details
- Born: 22 March 1899 Berbek, Nganjuk, Dutch East Indies
- Died: 19 April 1984 (aged 85) Jakarta, Indonesia
- Spouse: Joeari (m. 1924)
- Children: Wahyudi Wisaksono

Wisaksono Wirjodihardjo (22 March 1899 – 19 April 1984) was an Indonesian academician and politician who served as the first vice president (now known as deputy rector) of the University of Indonesia from 1950 to 1955.

== Early life and education ==
Wisaksono was born on 22 March 1899 in Berbek, Kediri, as the son of Wirodihardjo, a school administrator in nearby Kendal. He attended the Cultuurschool (agriculture middle school) in Sukabumi, where he majored in agriculture, and received his diploma in 1916. Due to his academic achievements, he was recommended to continue his education to the agriculture high school (Middelbare Landbouw School) in Bogor, which he completed in 1919. He worked as an assistant chemist at a sugar factory in Seboro, Probolinggo, before receiving a recommendation to pursue tertiary studies at the Suikerschool (Sugar School) in Surabaya for his academic pursuits. He finished Suikerschool in 1924.

== Research career ==
After graduating from the Suikerschool, he worked in oil and sugar factories in East Java, but dedicated most of his time to soil research. His brilliance led him to work at the Soil Research Institute in Bogor as a chemical analyst. Despite the colonial resistance to indigenous expertise, he was eventually recognized as an expert in soil fertility chemistry, a feat which was considered remarkable and unexpected by many Dutch scientists of the time. He became the institute's first indigenous director during the Japanese occupation. He was also active in politics as a member of the Bogor municipal council and the city's alderman for financial affairs.

In the midst of Japanese occupation, Wisaksono managed to repatriate eight European academics from internment camps to ensure the continued operation of the scientific institutes in Bogor. Following the Proclamation of Indonesian Independence, in October 1945 he was arrested by pemuda (youth groups) and was taken to Cipanas due to his "broad and liberal views" toward the Dutch. He was described as a unique figure who fought for the Indonesian interests inside the Dutch-made government system.

== Political career ==
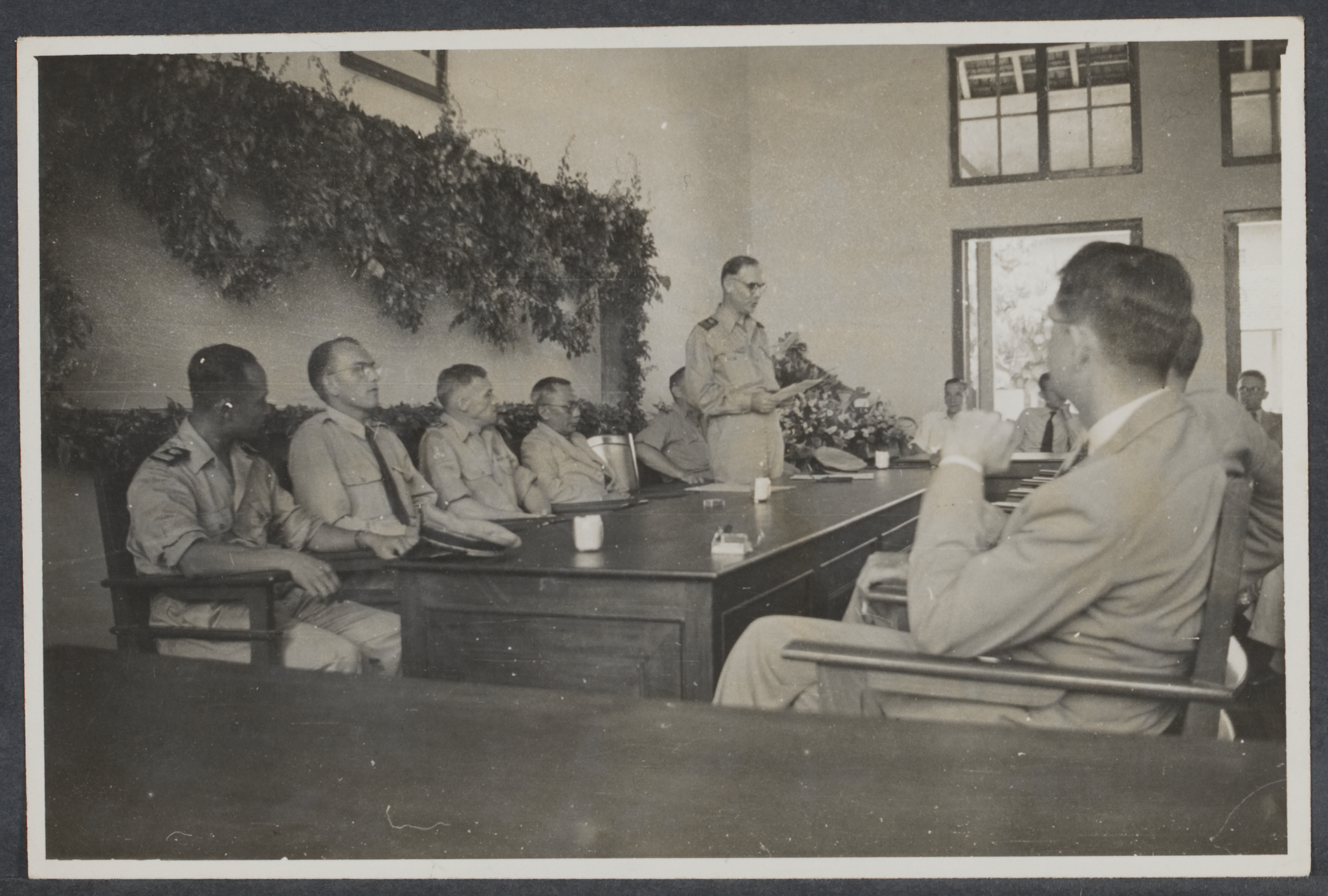
Inauguration of Wisaksono as the mayor of Bogor.

During the Indonesian National Revolution, Wisaksono sided with the Dutch forces, and received the Knight of the Order of Orange-Nassau for his works in soil research on 17 September 1946. Following the Dutch's Operation Product, which occupied Bogor, Wisaksono assumed office as the city's mayor on 9 August 1947. In his speech, Wisaksono lauded the Dutch's military actions, which "prevented a wasteland of burnt and smashed houses". As mayor, Wisaksono played a significant role in the establishment of the new Indonesian trade union in Bogor, the Gasbi. Wisaksono attended the First West Java Conference in December, which he described as "highly successful" due to the presence of the various representative of different ideologies. Following the conference, Wisaksono stated that anticipated West Java might become a special region rather than a full-fledged state.

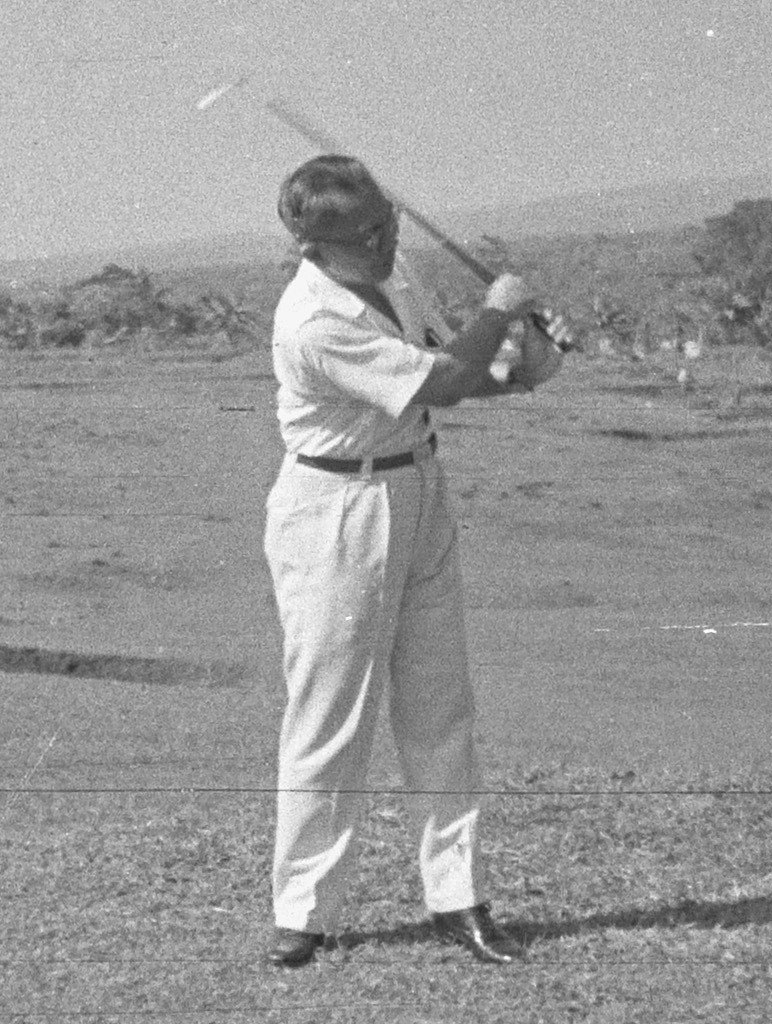
Wisaksono as mayor playing golf, August 1947.

In the second conference held on December that year, Wisaksono warned that the pursuit of forming a state should be based on the desire to be part of the upcoming Dutch-led federation and not by provincialism. He was one of the leading figures who managed to reconcile the various factions present in the conference and formulated a joint resolution which combined three motions submitted by the factions. The resolution, which was adopted unanimously, called for the formation of an autonomous West Java state, the establishment of a representative body, and the transfer of governing authority to the proposed provisional government as soon as possible. His resolution was adopted with 140 votes in favor and no votes against.

A few weeks later, on 10 January 1948, Wisaksono was announced as a member of a Dutch-sponsored provisional federal council. The council, which was installed three days after its announcement, was tasked with preparing the formation of a provisional federal government in consultation with the Lieutenant Governor-General. Following his appointment to the council, the city's secretary Soewandi became acting mayor.

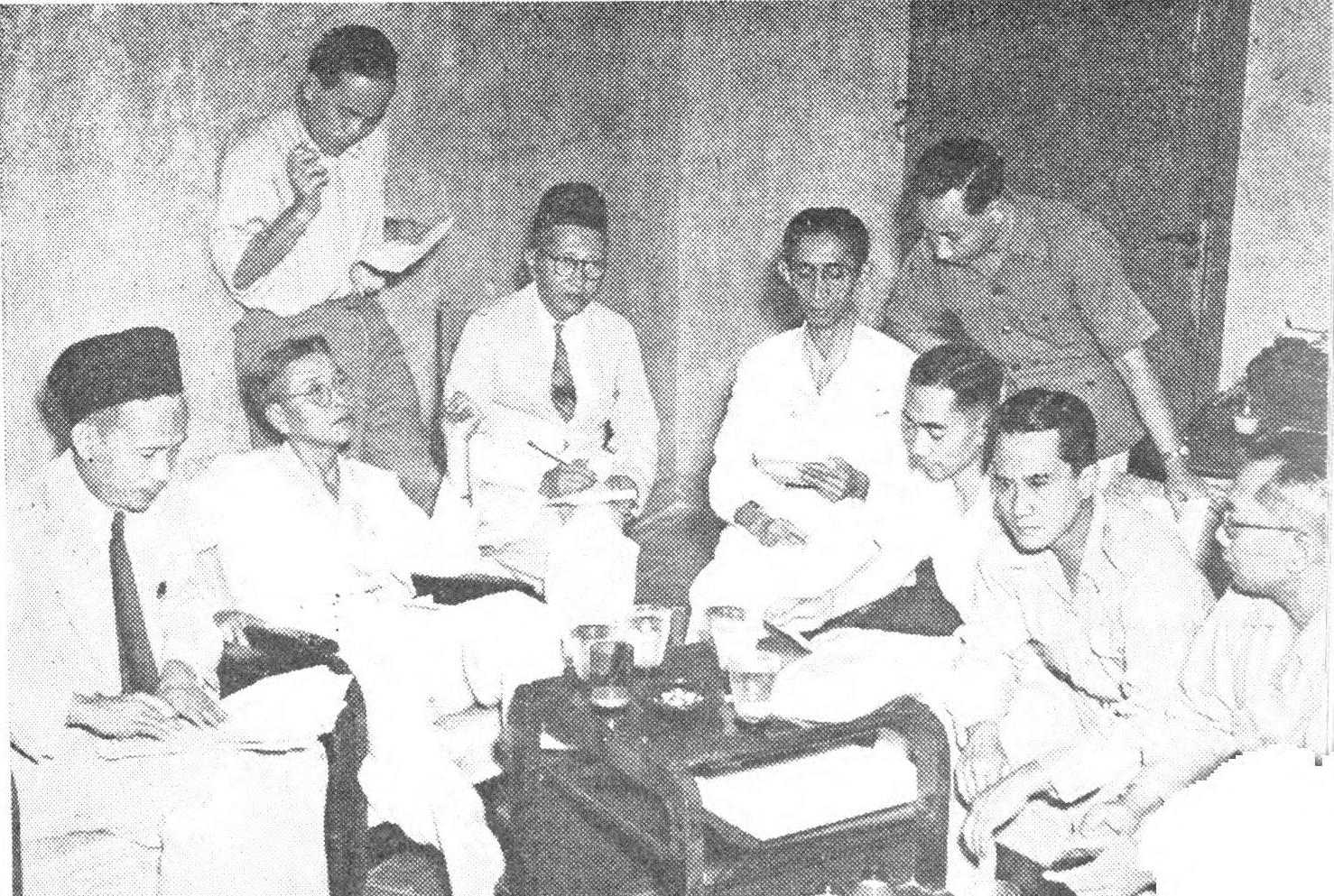
Wisaksono (far right) during a lobby in the Second West Java Conference.

On 9 March 1948, the provisional council was transformed into a provisional executive government. Members of the provisional council and several other officials were appointed as state secretaries, which was directly responsible to the lieutenant governor general. The economic affairs department, which existed in the pre-World War colonial government, was considered too big, and was split into the trade and industry and agriculture and fisheries department, with Wisaksono heading the latter. In his inaugural address, Wisaksono stated that the government did not appoint him as a soil scientist but as a representative of the political wishes of the Indonesian people.

As state secretary, Wisaksono argued that Indonesia's food problems are mostly due to economic and administrative matters rather than of natural causes. He was responsible for procuring the Marshall Plan funds for the Dutch East Indies, which he directed to support the small middle class and stimulate private initiatives. He formulated a three-year prosperity plan (later known as the Wisaksono plan), which aimed at achieving food self-sufficiency by 1956 by increasing the volume of harvests and the production of meat and fish in 3 to 5 years. The plan outlined five key programs, which are the promotion of mixed farming (by combining) food crops with livestock, increasing superior seeds utilization, expansion of the use of artificial fertilizers, advancement of small-scale livestock farming for protein and nutrition, and the development of fisheries with government capital for equipment and pond improvements. To achieve its goals, Wisaksono invited agricultural experts to Indonesia and initiated cooperation between Dutch and Indonesian companies.

By the end of 1949, the provisional federal government was disestablished and replaced by the United States of Indonesia in the Dutch–Indonesian Round Table Conference. Although he was initially slated as one of the two members of the provisional government to retain his position, he was not appointed to the United States of Indonesia cabinet and resigned following the transfer of sovereignty on 27 December 1949. The department of economic affairs was re-established in the cabinet, headed by minister Djuanda Kartawidjaja. Three days after the transfer of sovereignty, Wisaksono was appointed as the chief officer for agriculture and fisheries in the department. Wisaksono's plan continued to be used in conjunction with the Kasino plan, formulated by minister of food supply Ignatius Joseph Kasimo Hendrowahyono, but its implementation was hindered due to the political and security challenges at that time.

== Academic career ==
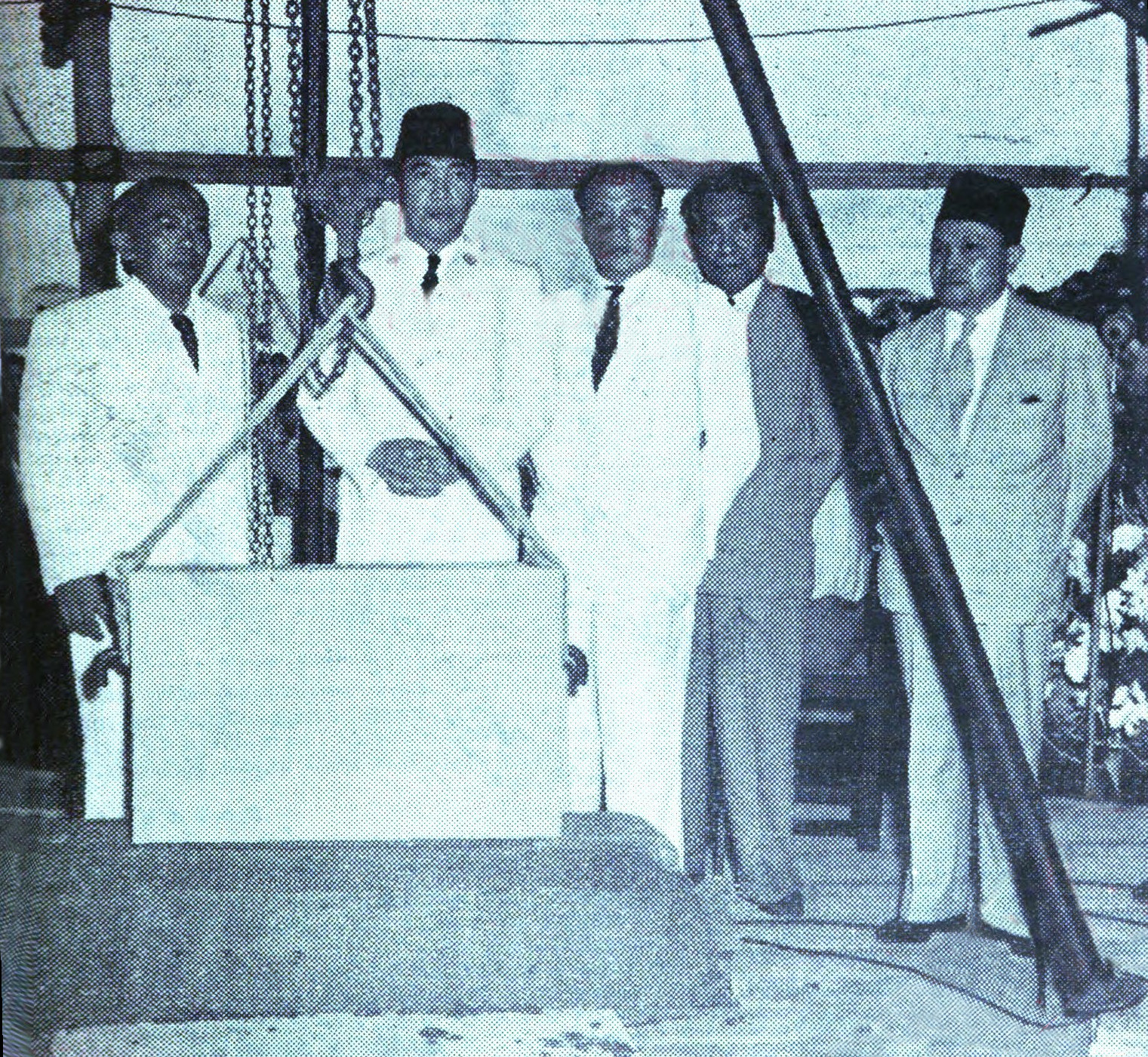
Wisaksono (far left) at the groundbreaking ceremony of the University of Indonesia Agriculture Faculty complex in Bogor.

Following the establishment of the University of Indonesia on 2 February 1950 as a merger between the Dutch-managed Universiteit van Indonesië and the Indonesian-managed Indonesian Higher Education Center, Wisaksono was appointed as a member of the board of curators. Later on, on 25 July 1951, the new rector of the university, Soepomo, established the University of Indonesia foundation, where Wisaksono became its treasurer. Two days later, on 27 July, Wisaksono was appointed as the vice president of the university. By 1952, Wisaksono became the director of the Government Agricultural Estates (Pusat Perkebunan Negara, PPN). He travelled through the Southern United States along with commercial counsellor of the Indonesian embassy in Washington D.C. Ismael Thajeb to observe mechanised agriculture.

At the time of the groundbreaking ceremony of the university's agriculture faculty (later separated to form the Bogor Agriculture Institute) in Bogor in 1952, Wisaksono wrote the speech for President Sukarno, which was titled A Matter of Life or Death (Soal Hidup atau Mati). The speech was described by Bogor Agriculture Institute rector Andi Hakim Nasution as a "profound and prophetic" speech, as the problems that Wisaksono foresaw in the article have materialized, and that he recommended more students and professionals in agriculture and engineering to the speech so that they would "reconsider decisions like converting prime rice fields into golf courses".

Wisaksono continued his career in the department of economic affairs, where he was appointed as the director of government agricultural companies in 1952, during which he oversaw the opening of a new building for his agency. He retired from the vice presidency of the university on 1 October 1955.

During this time, he authored three books on soil science within three years, which some in the field considered seminal works. Due to his expertise, Wisaksono was often referred to as an engineering graduate (Ir.) or a full professor (Prof.), despite having no degree. In his retirement, he became a member of the International Society of Soil Science.

== Personal life ==
He resided at Bogor, with Joeari, whom he married in Semarang in 1924. They had one son, Wahyudi Wiratmoko, who served as the director of the Oil and Gas Agency in the Department of Mines. He remained an avid reader of newspapers, particularly focusing on news related to government and agriculture. Wisaksono died on 19 April 1984 and was buried at the Jeruk Purut public cemetery in Jakarta.
