= Bebeb Djundjunan =

Indonesian ambassador to Greece

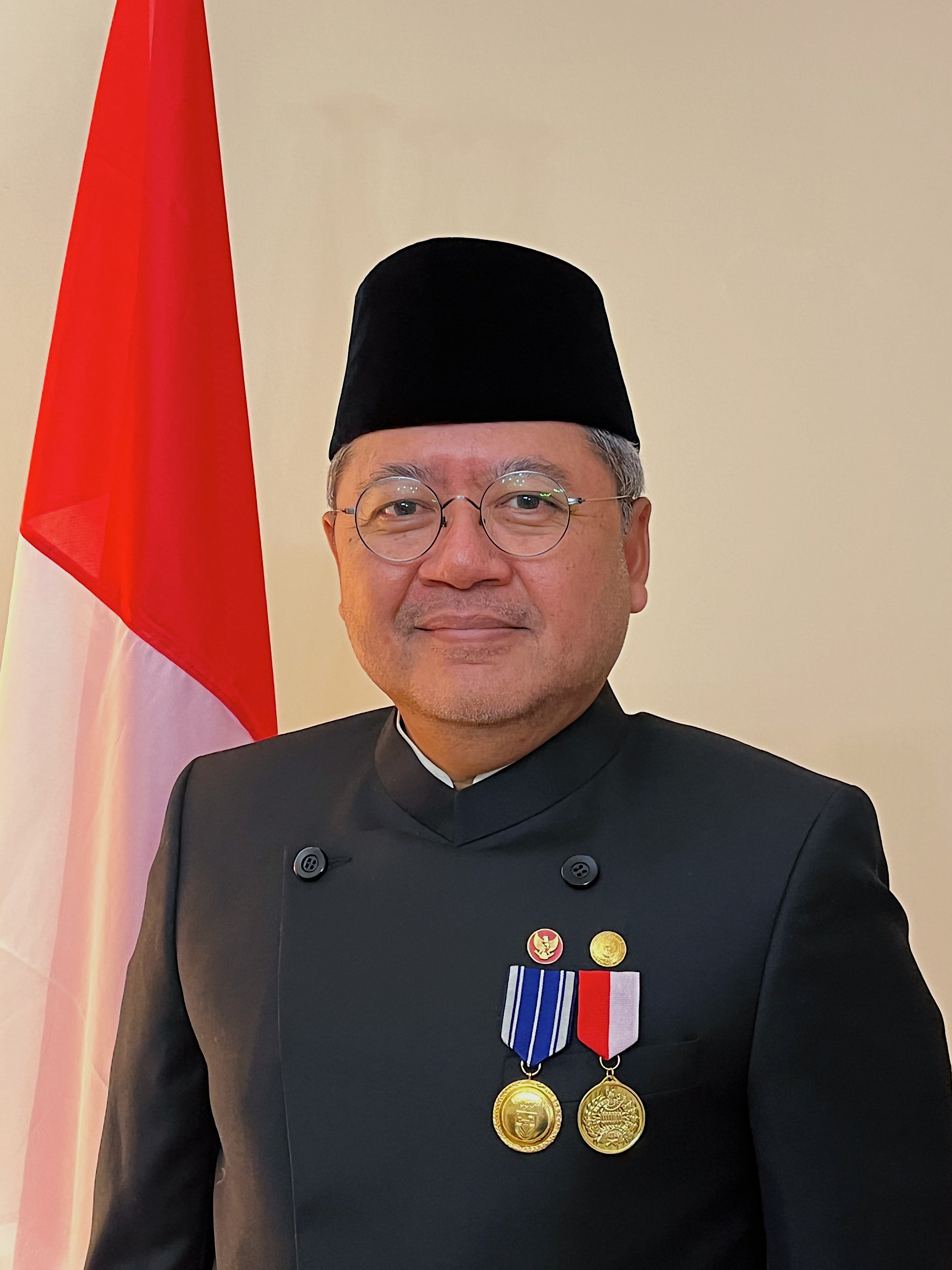

Ambassador of Indonesia to Greece
- Incumbent
- Assumed office 17 November 2021
- President: Joko Widodo; Prabowo Subianto
- Preceded by: Ferry Adamhar

Personal details
- Born: 23 July 1962 (age 63)
- Spouse: Jualita Natalia Stevanny
- Education: Padjadjaran University (S.H., Dr.); University of Kent (LL.M.)

Bebeb Abdul Kurnia Nugraha Djundjunan (born 23 July 1962) is an Indonesian diplomat currently serving as ambassador to Greece since 2021. Prior to this appointment, he had served as the director of territorial law and treaties at the foreign ministry since 2016.

== Early life and education ==
Djundjunan was born in Bandung, West Java, on July 23, 1962 as the eldest child of fourth of Otje Djundjunan, former mayor of Bandung, and Popong Otje Djundjunan, a five-term member of parliament. His grandfather from his father's side, Djundjunan Setiakusumah, was the first physician in Bandung and had served as minister of health within the State of Pasundan.

Djundjunan harbored a childhood dream of becoming a diplomat, which led him to pursue higher education in international law. He studied the subject at the Padjadjaran University. During his studies, he joined the Bandung Student Association, law faculty's student senate, and the university's hockey team. He served as chairman of the latter from 1982 to 1985 and chairman of the international law student's association from 1984 to 1986. He eventu was a member of the Bandung Student Association in 1981 and served as Chairman of the Hockey Unit from 1982 to 1985. He was also a member of the Student Senate for the Faculty of Law from 1982 to 1984 and Chairman of the International Law Student Association from 1984 to 1986. He eventuallyr received his bachelor's degree in 1987. During his career in the foreign department, he received his master of laws in international commercial law from the University of Kent in 1992 and a doctorate in law from the Padjadjaran University in 2024. His doctoral thesis, which was advised by Huala Adolf, Gusman C., Siswandi, and Damos Dumoli Agusman, discussed the delimitation of sea border in reference to the United Nations Convention on the Law of the Sea.

== Career ==
Djundjunan began his career in the foreign department in 1989 after completing basic diplomatic training. He began his career at the directorate of international treaties in 1990, serving as the chief of social treaties section within the directorate from 1991 to 1994. He was then posted to the permanent mission of Indonesia in Geneva, serving within the permanent's mission political section with the rank of second secretary until 1998. In Geneva, Djundjunan was admitted to the United Nations diplomatic community as an associate member in 1995.

Upon his return, he headed the maritime law section within the directorate from 1998 to 2001. During this period, he completed his mid-level diplomatic training in 1999. He was subsequently posted to Canada, serving as consul for consular affairs within the consulate general in Vancouver from 2001 to 2005. In Canada, he joined the conflict resolution network from 2003 to 2006 and as an Indonesian co-manager with Australia at the Regional Support Office of the Bali Process in Bangkok during the same period.

After serving for decades within the foreign department, in 2007 he was briefly assigned to the department of law and human rights as acting director for international law. He returned to the foreign department in 2010 as director for economic and social-cultural treaties for two years before being assigned to the embassy in Bangkok as deputy chief of mission with the rank of minister from 2012 to 2016. On 5 October 2016, he was appointed as the director of territorial law and treaties within the foreign ministry. Several months later, he was reappointed to the position on 3 January 2017 following reorganizations with the ministry. His primary responsibility was to address legal issues regarding with Indonesia's borders with its neighboring countries.

In June 2021, Djundjunan was nominated by President Joko Widodo as ambassador for Greece. Upon passing an assessment by the House of Representative's first commission in July, he was installed as ambassador on 17 November. He presented his credentials to the President of Greece Katerina Sakellaropoulou on 16 February 2022.

== Personal life ==
Bebeb is married to Jualita Natalia Stevanny.
