= Umar Hadi =

Indonesian diplomat (born 1968)

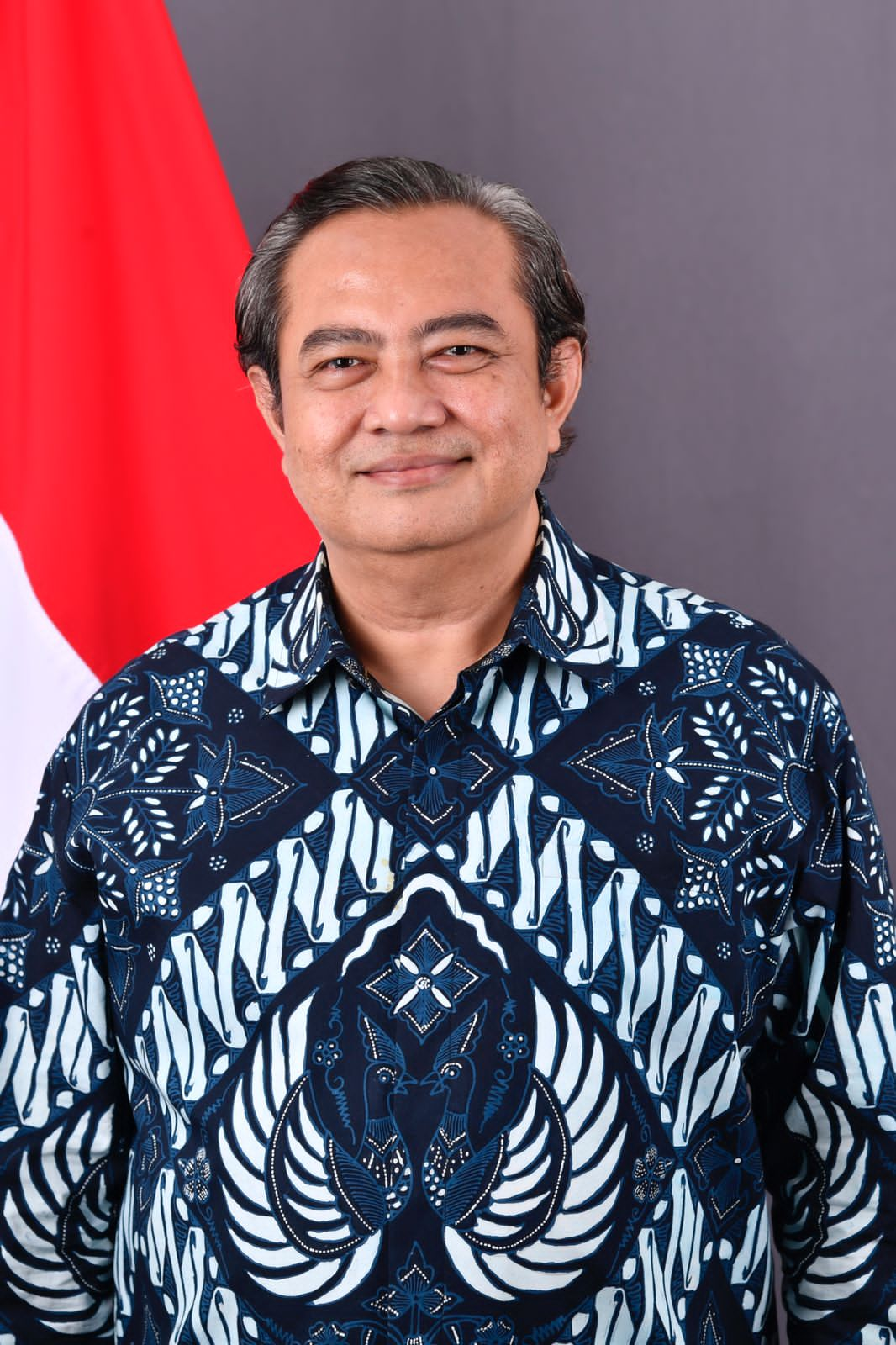

Permanent Representative of Indonesia to the United Nations
- Incumbent
- Assumed office 25 August 2025
- President: Prabowo Subianto
- Preceded by: Arrmanatha Nasir

Director General for Information and Public Diplomacy
- Acting
- In office 24 March 2025 – 17 September 2025
- Preceded by: Siti Nugraha Mauludiah
- Succeeded by: Heru Hartanto Subolo

Director General of America and Europe
- In office 15 September 2022 – 21 October 2025
- President: Joko Widodo; Prabowo Subianto
- Preceded by: I Gede Ngurah Swajaya
- Succeeded by: Kamapradipta Isnomo (acting); Grata Endah Werdaningtyas

Ambassador of Indonesia to South Korea
- In office 13 March 2017 – 30 September 2021
- President: Joko Widodo
- Preceded by: John A. Prasetio
- Succeeded by: Gandi Sulistiyanto

Personal details
- Born: 11 February 1968 (age 58) Bogor, West Java, Indonesia
- Spouse: Siti Nila Purnama Hadi
- Children: Ratna Aini Hadi
- Education: Padjadjaran University; Fletcher School of Law and Diplomacy

Umar Hadi (born 11 February 1968) is an Indonesian diplomat who has been currently serving as the permanent representative to the United Nations in New York since 2025. Previously, he served as ambassador to South Korea from 2017 to 2021 and director general for America and Europe from 2022 to 2025.

== Early life and education ==
Born in Bogor on 11 February 1968, Umar Hadi began studying international relations at the Padjadjaran University in 1986 and later graduated with a bachelor's degree. During his foreign service, he pursued a master's degree in international relations from the Fletcher School of Law and Diplomacy. He attended the multilateral specialization program at the Graduate Institute of International and Development Studies in Switzerland.

== Diplomatic career ==
Umar began his career at the foreign ministry in 1992, serving as an officer at ad-hoc office for Indonesia's chairmanship of the Non-Aligned Movement. He served for three years until he received his first assignment abroad at the permanent mission in Geneva with the rank of second secretary. In 2001, he returned to Jakarta with his appointment as chief of information and media section in the minister's administration bureau. In 2003, Umar issued a warning on The Jakarta Post for publishing personal opinions of legislators and revealing names of ambassadorial candidates and their intended postings.

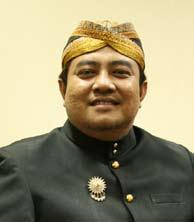
Umar Hadi as the director of public diplomacy in 2008.

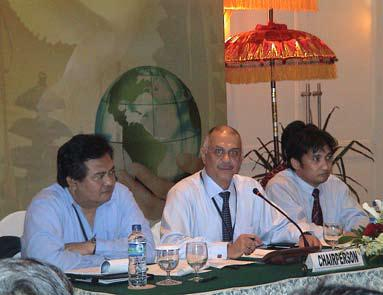
Umar (left) at the Bali Democracy Forum in 2008

He was then transferred to the directorate general of information and public diplomacy as the acting director for public diplomacy on 28 December 2005. Umar and other junior diplomats occupying strategic posts at that time was nicknamed as the Hassan's boys, which was cultivated by foreign minister Hassan Wirajuda to lead Indonesia's foreign policy. As public diplomacy director, Umar organized an informal gathering for Indonesian and foreign diplomats to interact in 2006. Following the formation of the Institute for Peace and Democracy—the implementing agency of the Bali Democracy Forum—in 2008, Umar became a member of its board of advisors.

Upon serving in Jakarta, he was posted to the embassy in the Hague as the deputy chief of mission in August 2009, serving under ambassadors Junus Effendi Habibie and Retno Marsudi. In the period of transition between the two ambassadors, Umar became the embassy's chargé d'affaires ad interim, during which he organized a night market to promote Indonesian cuisine which involved cities from all over Indonesia. On 12 April 2012, Umar became the Western Europe director in the foreign ministry.

== Consul general in Los Angeles ==
Umar was appointed as consul general Los Angeles in 2014, serving until 2017. Umar conducted his first meeting with Indonesian citizens in Los Angeles on 25 October 2014. During the formation of Joko Widodo's Working Cabinet, political researcher Raja Juli Antoni named Umar as a possible candidate for the foreign minister.

To promote Indonesia's trade potential, Umar conducted door-to-door visits to American importers of Indonesian goods to understand their challenges and strengthen trade ties and collaborate with Indonesian designers to showcase Indonesian traditional clothing at the Los Angeles Fashion Week.

Umar co-produced two movies during his career in Los Angeles. His first movie, titled Bali: Beats of Paradise, was produced alongside Julia Gouw, a Los Angeles banker, and directed by Indonesian filmmaker Livi Zheng. The movie, features I Nyoman Wenten and Naniek Wenten, who have promoted Balinese music and dance in the U.S. for over 40 years. The movie was selected for Oscar 2019 consideration in the Best Picture category and shown exclusively on Singapore Airlines. Aside from the movie, Livi Zheng and the consulate general also produced two promotional videos, titled LA's Gateway to Indonesia and Passport Services in LA Are Getting Easier and Safer, which went viral in video sharing sites.

== Ambassador to South Korea ==
K-Story with Tami program from Medcom ID displaying the daily life of Umar Hadi as ambassador in South Korea, 2019

In November 2016, Umar was nominated by President Joko Widodo for ambassador to South Korea. He passed an assessment by the House of Representative's first commission the next month and was installed on 18 May 2017. He presented his credentials to President of South Korea Moon Jae-in on 18 July 2017. Several months later, on November that year Moon Jae-in visited Indonesia.

During his tenure, he prioritized strengthening bilateral ties, particularly in economic, social, and cultural areas. He actively promoted Indonesian creative industries and cultural diversity to the South Korean market through movies, such as Bali: Beats of Paradise, which was well received by Korean audiences.

Umar announcing the safety of Indonesians residing in South Korea during the COVID-19 pandemic in South Korea

Serving the Indonesian citizens living in South Korea, Umar worked to improve the well-being of Indonesian migrant workers, ensuring they were treated equitably and had access to legal protection. In a meeting with Indonesian migrant workers, Umar pledged to eliminate illegal fees at the Indonesian Embassy in Seoul and committed to provide full support to Indonesian citizens in need. To assist the Indonesian citizens returning home, he initiated Kampung Korea (Kami Mantab Pulang Dari Korea) program to help Indonesian workers prepare for entrepreneurship by featuring speakers such as Sandiaga Uno and celebrity chef William Wongso. For his role in protecting Indonesian migrant worker, Umar received the 2018 Best Amb. Award from the NDNnews and the Seoulcity magazine on 21 June 2018.

During the COVID-19 pandemic in South Korea, Umar led the embassy's proactive pandemic response, including mask distribution and aid during outbreaks, as well as cooperating with the South Korean government for the handling. The embassy also implemented major transformations during the pandemic, with the implementation of health protocols, shifted nearly all embassy services online to reduce physical contact, and aimed for 100% eco-friendly operations at the embassy and diplomats' residences. Due to the movement restrictions implemented by the South Korean government, Umar did not visit a salon in over three months, resulting in noticeably longer hair. At the end of his term, on 2 June 2021 Umar received honorary citizenship of Seoul from Mayor Oh Se-hoon, becoming the first Indonesian Ambassador to receive this honor. Upon returning to Indonesia, in November of the same year Umar received the Golden Ambassador Award from the RMOL news network.

== Director general of America and Europe ==
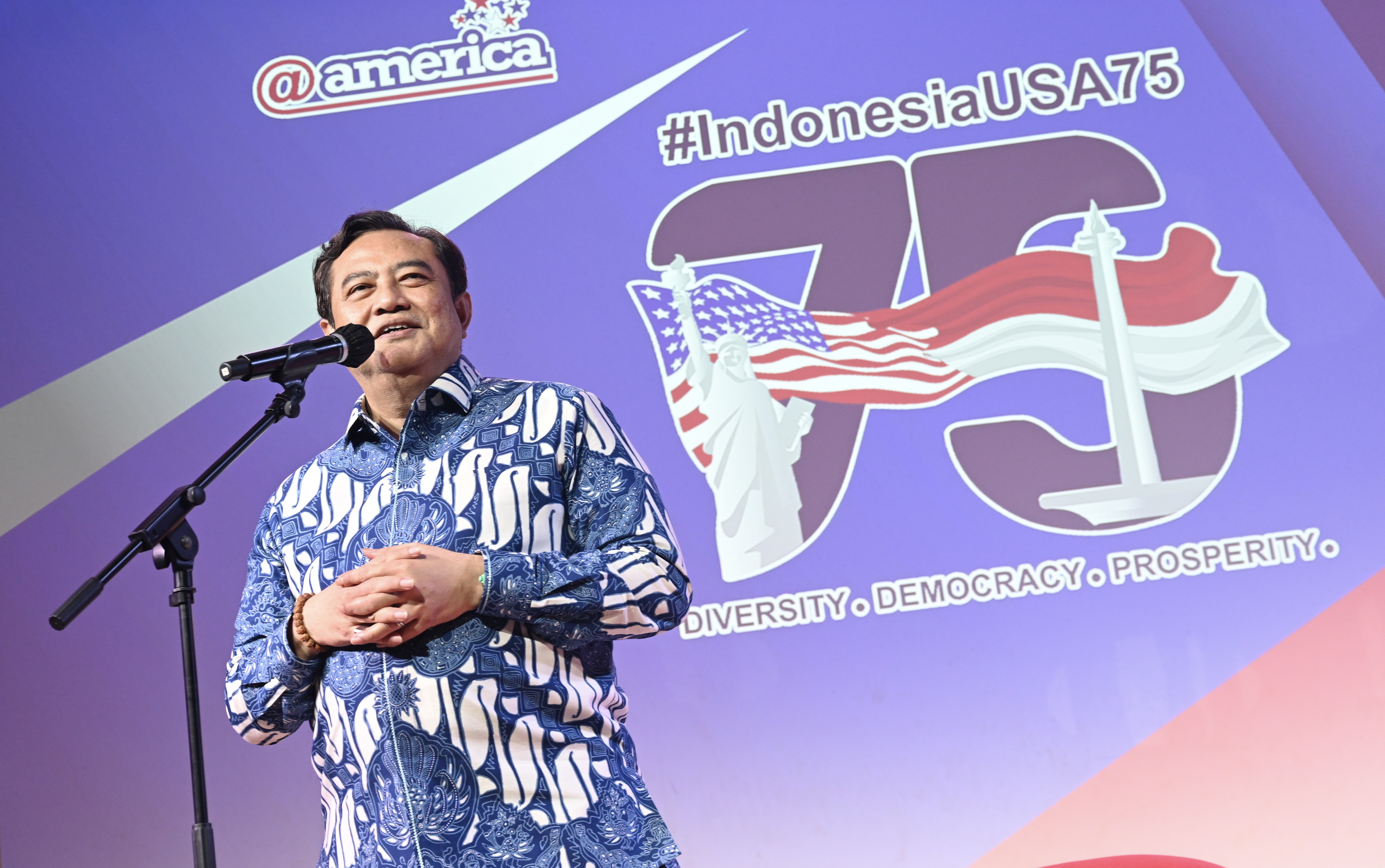
Umar delivering a speech at the 75th anniversary of Indonesia–US diplomatic relations in 2023

After his ambassadorship in South Korea, on 15 September 2022 Umar was appointed as America and Europe director general in the foreign ministry. During his tenure, in 2023 Umar summoned Sweden's ambassador to Indonesia Marina Berg over incidents of Quran burnings in the country. Umar, along with the defence ministry's strategy director general Bambang Trisnohadi, led the Indonesian delegation for the Indonesia–U.S. Senior Officials' 2+2 Foreign Policy Dialogue and Defense Dialogue.

== Permanent representative to the United Nations ==
In July 2025, Prabowo Subianto nominated Umar as the permanent representative to the United Nations. After passing an assessment by the House of Representative's first commission on 5 July 2025, his nomination was approved three days later. He was installed on 25 August 2025 and presented his credentials to the Secretary-General of the United Nations António Guterres on 19 September 2025.

On 9 April 2026, Umar, on behalf of 63 countries and the European Union, read out a joint statement condemning the Israeli attacks on the U.N. peacekeepers in Lebanon that resulted in the death of three Indonesian peacekeeping soldiers and injuring other soldiers from different countries.

== Personal life ==
Umar is married to Siti Nila Purnama and has a daughter, Ratna Aini Hadi, who is a researcher at the LUT University.
