= Heru Hartanto Subolo =

Indonesian diplomat (born 1966)

Raden Heru Hartanto Subolo
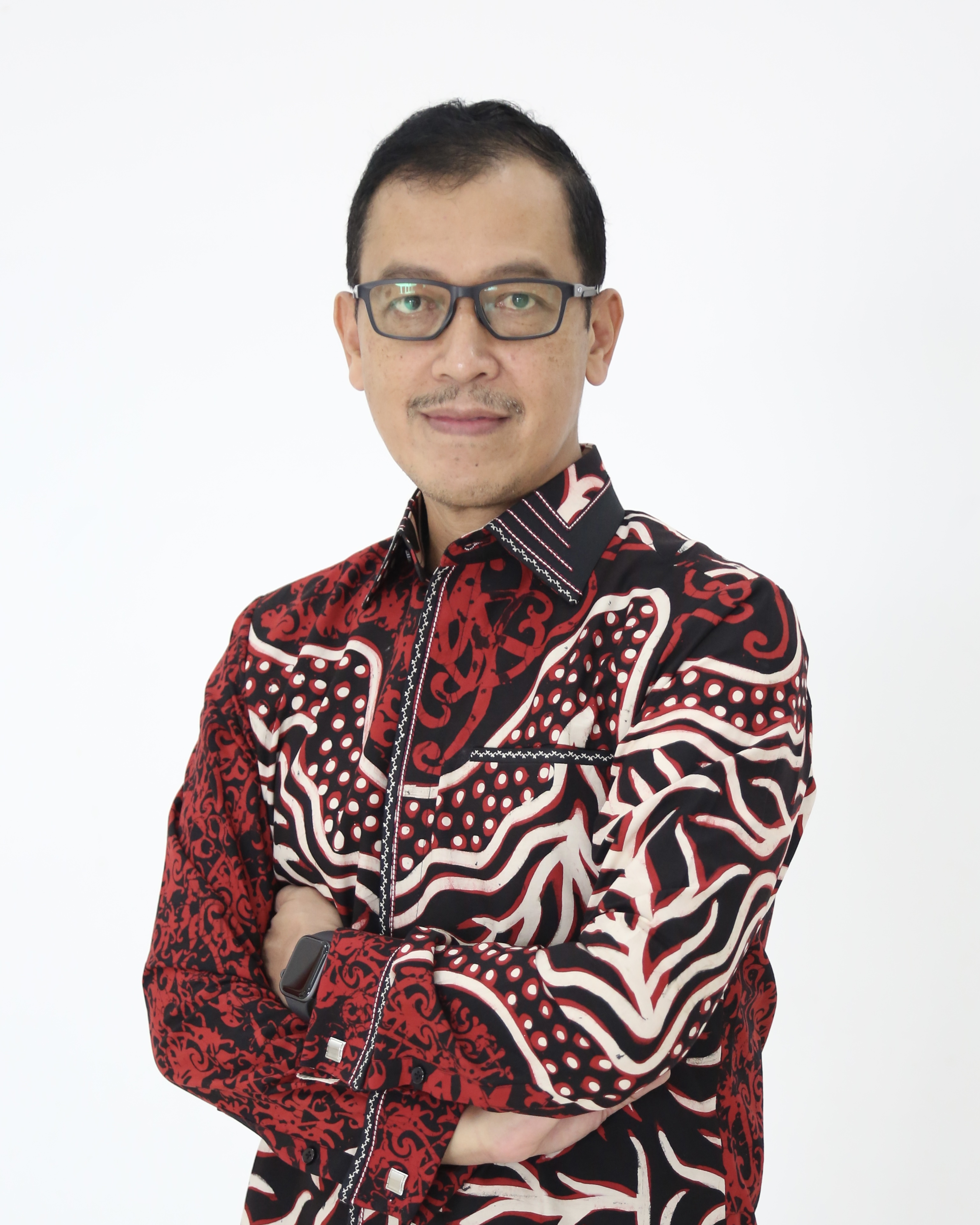

Director General for Information and Public Diplomacy
- In office 17 September 2025 – 1 October 2026
- Preceded by: Siti Nugraha Mauludiah; Umar Hadi (acting)
- Succeeded by: Kamapradipta Isnomo (acting)

Secretary General of the Ministry of Foreign Affairs
- Acting
- In office 24 July 2025 – 17 September 2025
- Preceded by: Cecep Herawan
- Succeeded by: Denny Abdi

Ambassador of Indonesia to Bangladesh and Nepal
- In office 17 November 2021 – 8 November 2024
- President: Joko Widodo; Prabowo Subianto
- Preceded by: Rina Soemarno
- Succeeded by: Listyowati

Personal details
- Born: September 27, 1966 (age 60) Surakarta, Central Java, Indonesia
- Spouse: Sinta Ekawati
- Children: 3
- Education: Padjadjaran University; Carleton University

Heru Hartanto Subolo (born 27 September 1966) is an Indonesian career diplomat who is currently serving as Director General for Information and Public Diplomacy in the Foreign Ministry since 2025. Prior to his appointment, he was the foreign minister's Senior Advisor for socio-cultural affairs and diaspora empowerment from 2024 to 2025, and Ambassador to Bangladesh and Nepal from 2021 to 2024.

== Early life education ==
Born in Pucangsawit, Surakarta, on 27 September, Subolo began studying international relations at the Padjadjaran University in 1985, where he earned his bachelor's degree in 1990. He furthered his education with a Master of Arts in International Development Studies from the Norman Paterson School of International Affairs at Carleton University in Ottawa, Canada, where he studied from 1994 to 1996. He also attended the Diplomatic Academy at the Clingendale Institute in The Hague.

== Career ==
Subolo joined the Ministry of Foreign Affairs in 1991. He was assigned as section chief from 1996 to 1997, before being posted abroad as vice consul at the Indonesia Consulate General in Houston, Texas, from August 1997 to July 2001. After a return to Jakarta to serve as head of section within the ASEAN Economic Affairs directorate from August 2001 to February 2004, he was assigned as to the Embassy of Indonesia in Oslo as Head of Economic Affairs covering also as the Head of Chancery with the rank of Counsellor from March 2004 to March 2008. He then returned to Jakarta as Deputy Director for ASEAN Security Affairs from March 2008 to January 2011.

Heru (second from right) shaking hands with Lord Mayor of Sydney Clover Moore at the 2018 CeBIT cybersecurity conference.

From January 2011 to July 2014, he served at the Embassy of Indonesia in Washington, D.C. with the rank of Minister Counsellor, where he led public diplomacy efforts and acted as the embassy's spokesperson. In this role, he managed programs to improve Indonesia's image and foster people-to-people contacts, including organizing the Guinness World Record for the Largest Angklung Ensemble successfully held on 6 July 2011, and the First Congress of Indonesian Diaspora in 2012 in Los Angeles and the Second Congress in Jakarta in 2013. A memorable initiative from this period was a collaboration with the Washington, D.C. school system to introduce Indonesian cuisine as a unique school lunch menu for 5,000 students. After his tenure in Washington, he was appointed as the Chief of Bureau for legal and administrative affairs for Indonesia's foreign representatives in December 2014, a position in which he provided legal and administrative support to the Ministry and its missions abroad. On 12 January 2018, he was installed as Consul General of Indonesia in Sydney, Australia. As consul general, his programs include a "Smart Consulate" to digitalize services, increasing the visibility of Indonesia in his jurisdiction, and strengthening people-to-people relations through a focus on the digital economy. His tenure was marked with a significant increase in economic cooperation and cultural diplomacy through the promotion of Indonesian language, arts, and cuisine. He initiated Indonesian Restaurant Association (IRA) during his tenure in Sydney.

=== Ambassador to Bangladesh and Nepal ===
In June 2021, Heru was nominated by President Joko Widodo as the Ambassador of Indonesia to Bangladesh, with concurrent accreditation to Nepal. Upon passing an assessment by the House of Representative's first commission in July, he was installed as ambassador on 17 November. He presented his credentials to President of Bangladesh Mohammad Abdul Hamid on 2 March 2022 and President of Nepal Bidya Devi Bhandari on 9 June 2022. During his tenure, the Indonesia-Bangladeshi trade level rebounded after a slowdown caused by the pandemic. He also oversaw the signing of trade and business cooperation agreement worth US$302 million (approximately Rp 4.53 trillion) during the Trade Expo Indonesia (TEI) in October 2022. He also receive a prestigious Primanyarta Awards for the best performance Ambassador for his contribution to advancinfg bilateral trade relations. He ended his tenure as ambassador on 8 November 2024 and was replaced by chargé d'affaires ad interim Arif Suyoko.

=== Director general ===
Upon serving as ambassador, Heru became the foreign minister's Senior Advisor for socio-cultural affairs and diaspora empowerment. Following the departure of foreign ministry secretary general Cecep Herawan as ambassador to South Korea, Heru replaced him in as an Acting Secretary General on 24 July 2025. On 17 September 2025, Heru was installed as the director general of information and public diplomacy in the foreign ministry. He relinquished his office in line with his retirement from the civil service on 1 October 2026, and he was replaced by Kamapradipta Isnomo as acting director general.

=== Ambassador to Greece ===
On 10 August 2026, Heru was nominated by President Prabowo Subianto as ambassador to Greece. He underwent a parliamentary vetting process by the House of Representative's first commission on 22 September 2026.

== Personal life ==
Heru is married to Sinta Ekawati and has three children.
