= Arief Hidayat (diplomat) =

Indonesian diplomat (born 1965)

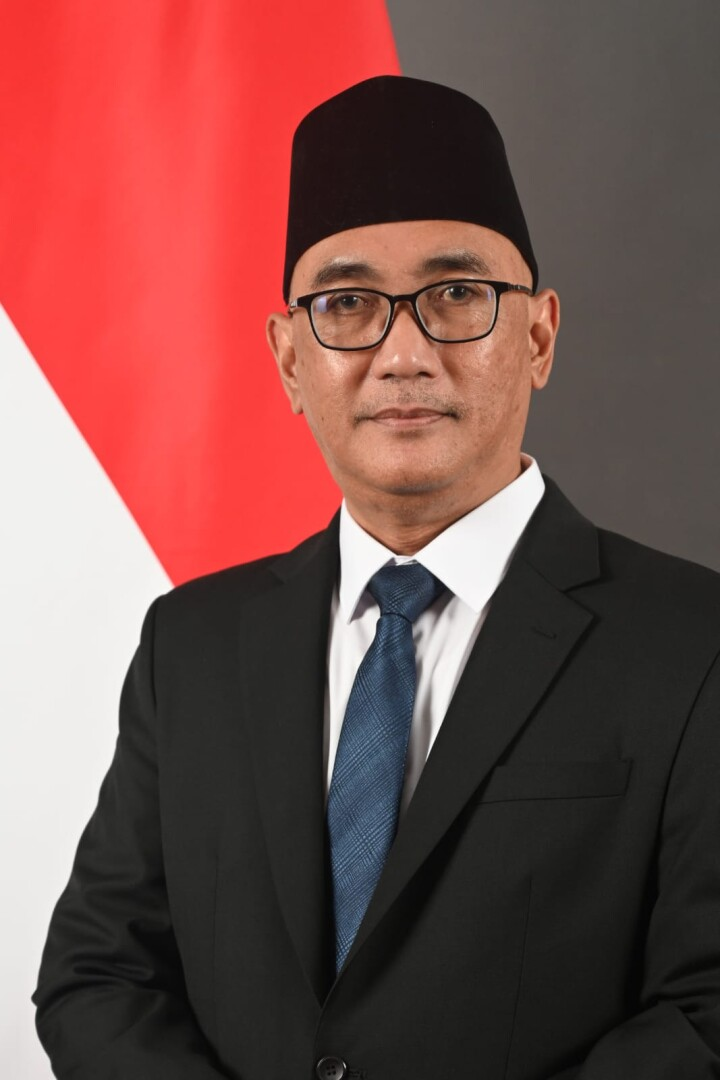

Ambassador of Indonesia to Zimbabwe and Zambia
- Incumbent
- Assumed office 24 March 2025
- President: Prabowo Subianto
- Preceded by: Dewa Made Juniarta Sastrawan

Chief of Permits and Investment Service of Yogyakarta
- In office 16 May 2018 – 3 August 2020
- Preceded by: Totok Prianamto
- Succeeded by: Agus Priono

Personal details
- Born: 17 March 1965 (age 61) Yogyakarta, Indonesia
- Education: Gadjah Mada University

Arief Hidayat (born 17 May 1965) is an Indonesian diplomat who is currently serving as ambassador to Zimbabwe and Zambia since 24 March 2025. Previously, he was the deputy chief of mission at the embassy in Riyadh.

== Biography ==
Arief was born in Yogyakarta on 17 May 1965. He studied international relations at the Gadjah Mada University and joined the foreign ministry in March 1993. In 2014, Arief was assigned to the economic section of the embassy in Amman with the rank of counsellor, serving as head of chancery. Arief returned to Jakarta with his posting in the directorate for the protection of Indonesian citizens, where in 2016 he escorted 49 Indonesian Hajj pilgrims who had traveled using Philippine passports. He was then assigned as the deputy director (chief of subdirectorate) of the second region in the directorate, covering the Gulf Cooperation Council countries and Europe.

In April 2018, Arief applied for the position of the chief of Yogyakarta's cooperation and investment agency. The post had been vacant following the departure of Totok Prianamto since February that year. He placed first in the competency exam, setting aside diplomats Kuncoro Giri Waseso (now ambassador to Egypt) and Nugroho Yuwono Aribhimo (now senior diplomat at the embassy in Dili), and was summoned for a meeting with the governor Hamengkubuwono X. Arief was sworn in for the post on 16 May 2018. Several months later, the agency was reorganized into the permits and investment service, and Arief was re-installed as the chief of the service on 3 January 2019.

During his tenure, Arief pushed to ease investment process in Yogyakarta by evaluating investment related regulations. He also oversaw the re-opening of Gojek's regional office in Yogyakarta following protests from drivers and the development of an aerotropolis at the Yogyakarta International Airport, although the latter was delayed due to the ongoing COVID-19 pandemic. He was replaced as service chief by Agus Priono on 3 August 2020.

After his tenure in Yogyakarta, Arief served as deputy chief of mission at the embassy in Riyadh, where from 30 September to 12 December 2021 he became the embassy's chargé d'affaires ad interim. He then returned to Jakarta as a senior diplomat in the foreign ministry's Africa directorate.

In August 2024, President Joko Widodo nominated Arief as Indonesia's ambassador to Zimbabwe, with concurrent accreditation to Zambia. He passed a fit and proper test held by the House of Representative's first commission in September that year and was installed by President Prabowo Subianto on 24 March 2025. Shortly after his installation, he and five other new ambassadors from UGM met with UGM rector Ova Emilia and Yogyakarta governor Hamengkubuwono X. He received his duties from chargé d'affaires ad interim Panca Hendarto on 2 July 2025. He presented his credentials to the President of Zimbabwe Emmerson Mnangagwa on 1 October 2025 and the President of Zambia Hakainde Hichilema on 27 May 2026.
