= Linggawaty Hakim =

Indonesian diplomat (born 1959)

Ambassador of Indonesia to Switzerland and Liechtenstein
- In office 24 December 2013 – 2018
- President: Susilo Bambang Yudhoyono; Joko Widodo
- Preceded by: Djoko Susilo
- Succeeded by: Muliaman Hadad

Director General for International Law and Treaties
- In office September 2010 – 24 December 2013
- Preceded by: Arif Havas Oegroseno
- Succeeded by: Ferry Adamhar

Ambassador of Indonesia to Sweden and Latvia
- In office 18 October 2006 – September 2010
- President: Susilo Bambang Yudhoyono
- Preceded by: Tjahjono
- Succeeded by: Dewa Made Juniarta Sastrawan

Personal details
- Born: 19 April 1959 (age 67) Bandung, Indonesia
- Education: Padjadjaran University (S.H.); Stockholm University (LLM)

Linggawaty Hakim (born 19 April 1959) is an Indonesian retired diplomat who last served as ambassador to Switzerland and Liechtenstein from 2014 to 2018. A Padjadjaran University alumni, Linggawaty previously served as the director general for international law and treaties from 2010 to 2014 and ambassador to Sweden and Latvia from 2006 to 2010.

== Early life ==
Linggawaty was born in Bandung, Indonesia, on 19 April 1959. She earned her bachelor's degree in law from the Padjadjaran University in 1982. She later obtained a master of international law from the University of Stockholm in Sweden in 1990.

== Diplomatic career ==
Linggawaty joined the foreign department upon graduating from Padjadjaran, serving as a staff within the subdirectorate for economic and financial treaties. She underwent a British Council examination in 1984 and junior diplomatic education from 1984 to 1985. She began her career from 1986 to 1988 as chief of the committee on food, agriculture, and forestry at the ASEAN National Secretariat in Jakarta. She also attended ASEAN diplomatic course in Kuala Lumpur and Singapore in 1986. Her first foreign assignment followed from 1988 to 1991, when she was assigned to the press, information, social, and cultural affairs section of the embassy in Stockholm with the rank of third secretary. During her assignment in Sweden, Linggawaty completed a Swedish law course at the University of Stockholm in 1989.

She returned to the foreign department to serve as the head of section for political and security affairs within the directorate of treaties and legal affairs from 1991 to 1993. In 1992, she attended policy course on human rights with the United Nations in Geneva in 1992. She also became a member of a task force to support Indonesia's non-permanent membership in the United Nations Security Council (UNSC), where she sat in the UNSC's sanction committee.

She was then posted to the permanent mission to the United Nations in New York from 1993 to 1998, where she served in the political and legal affairs with the rank of second secretary and later first secretary. During her tenure in New York, she represented Indonesia at the United Nations General Assembly Sixth Committee, where she was involved in drafting legal documents and formulate legal conventions for international laws. She was also a delegate for Indonesia to the conference of parties of the Law of the Sea in New York and Sea Bed Authority in Kingston, Jamaica, where in 1997 she assisted the Bahamas government in resolving a dispute with Cuba on maritime borders.

She returned to Jakarta as deputy director (chief of subdirectorate) for socio-cultural affairs in the directorate of treaties and legal affairs from 1998 to 2000. During this period, she completed her mid-career and senior diplomatic training courses in 1999 and 2000, respectively. She was involved in drafting the legal basis for Indonesia's foreign relations (Law No. 37 of 1999) and international treaties (Law No. 24 of 2000).

Her next foreign posting was to the political affairs section of the embassy in Brussels from 2000 to 2002, when she served with the rank of counselor and later minister counsellor. On 3 May 2002, Linggawaty assumed duties as the director for non-UN economic, financial, and development cooperation. After a three-year stint, on 28 December 2005 she became the director for social, cultural, and international organizations of developing countries. Outside the foreign ministry, Linggawaty served as the director of the Non Aligned Movement Centre for South-South Technical Cooperation, which was based in Jakarta, from 2002 to 2006 and served as a coordinator for issues during Indonesia's chairmanship of the D-8 Organization for Economic Cooperation from 2005 to 2006.

=== Ambassador to Sweden and Latvia ===
On 18 October 2006, Linggawaty was appointed ambassador to Sweden and Latvia, with residence in Stockholm. She arrived in Stockholm on 25 November 2006 and presented her credentials to the King of Sweden Carl XVI Gustaf on 30 November 2006 and the President of Latvia Vaira Vīķe-Freiberga on 16 January 2007. During her presentation of credentials to Freiberga, Freiberga expressed her pride in receiving "a woman ambassador from the largest Muslim nation". Linggawaty herself described Freiberga as "Latvia's Thatcher".

Linggawaty was tasked with smoothing relations strained by the insurgency in Aceh and improving Indonesia's image regarding human rights. During her tenure, she successfully managed regional tensions, such as the spread of the Danish cartoon controversy, by facilitating dialogue between the Swedish government and ambassadors from Islamic nations. A significant achievement was organizing the first-ever bilateral meeting between the Indonesian and Swedish foreign ministers in 2008. In Latvia, Hakim significantly raised Indonesia's profile through a promotion themed "Indonesia is Coming," which included cultural events, such as a Sleman batik promotion, and academic seminars. These efforts led to the first bilateral meeting between the foreign ministers of Indonesia and Latvia in May 2009.

=== Director general of international law and treaties ===
After serving as ambassador, Linggawaty returned to Jakarta with her appointment as the acting director general for international law and treaties in September 2010, with her appointment being made permanent in May 2011. She also resuming her role as director of the Non-Aligned Movement Centre for South-South Technical Cooperation in May 2010. On 1 July 2011, she was nominated as a candidate for the financial board of the International Seabed Authority.

As director general, Linggawaty pushed for the legal protection of Indonesian cultural heritage, urging regional governments in Indonesia to record cultural heritages in their region in order to prevent it from being claimed by other nations. She also proposed a centralized database of cultural heritage records from all over Indonesia. When the Malaysian government attempted to register Tortor as its traditional heritage dance, Linggawaty urged Malaysia to acknowledge Indonesia as Tortor's country of origin, and sent a diplomatic note as a protest.

=== Ambassador to Switzerland and Liechtenstein ===
On 4 September 2013, Linggawaty was nominated by President Susilo Bambang Yudhoyono as ambassador to Switzerland and Liechtenstein. After undergoing an assessment by the House of Representative's first commission on 17 September 2013, Linggawaty was sworn in on 24 December 2013. She presented her credentials to the President of the Swiss Confederation Didier Burkhalter on 17 March 2014 and to the Alois, Hereditary Prince of Liechtenstein on 25 April 2014. She announced her departure to the Indonesian community in Switzerland on 18 November 2017.
