= Siti Nugraha Mauludiah =

Indonesian diplomat (born 1967)

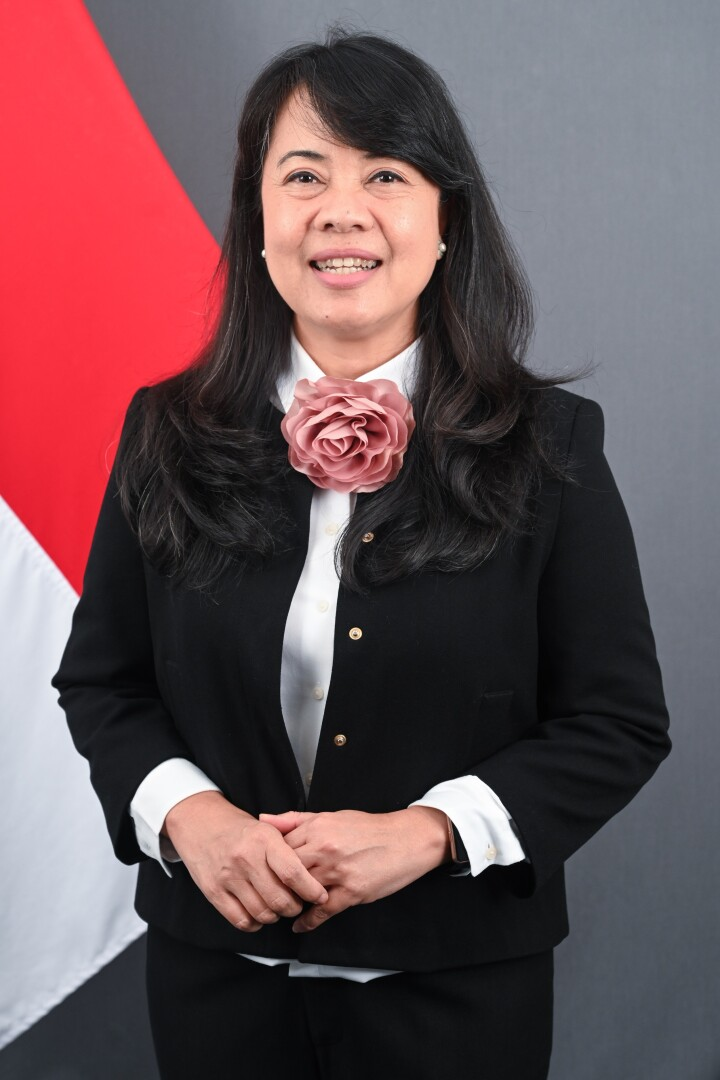

Ambassador of Indonesia to Denmark and Lithuania
- Incumbent
- Assumed office 24 March 2025
- President: Prabowo Subianto
- Preceded by: Dewi Savitri Wahab

Director General for Information and Public Diplomacy
- In office 6 October 2023 – 24 March 2025
- President: Joko Widodo
- Preceded by: Teuku Faizasyah
- Succeeded by: Umar Hadi (acting); Heru Hartanto Subolo

Ambassador of Indonesia to Poland
- In office 7 January 2019 – 17 November 2021
- President: Joko Widodo
- Preceded by: Peter F. Gontha
- Succeeded by: Anita Lidya Luhulima

Personal details
- Born: June 20, 1967 (age 59) Bandung, West Java, Indonesia
- Spouse: Gino Hedianto
- Education: Padjadjaran University; Graduate School of International and Public Affairs
- Nickname: Nining

Siti Nugraha Mauludiah (born 20 June 1967) is an Indonesian diplomat currently serving as Indonesia's ambassador to Denmark and Lithuania since 24 March 2025. Prior to her current role, she served as ambassador to Poland from 2019 to 2021 and as director general for information and public diplomacy from 2023 to 2025.

== Early life ==
Siti was born in Bandung on 20 June 1967. She studied English literature at the Padjadjaran University from 1985 and graduated in 1990 with a bachelor's degree. Following her undergraduate studies, she continued her education at Columbia University's Graduate School of International and Public Affairs in New York, completing a master's degree in international economic policy from 1995 to 1997.

== Career ==
Siti commenced her career at the foreign department in 1991 after being invited by her boyfriend. While she was interning at the protocol directorate, she became a substitute master of ceremony in a banquet hosted by foreign minister Ali Alatas due to the absence of any MCs. She was congratulated by Ali, although Ali slightly criticized her pronunciation of the word "republic".

From August 1998 to November 2002, she served as program director for SMEs, gender issues dan social safety net issues at the APEC Secretariat in Singapore. According to her, during this period, she gained invaluable experience in navigating complex international debates, learning to find common ground and "win-win solutions" even when direct advocacy for her home country was not possible, an experience she credits with shaping her distinctive diplomatic approach. Subsequently, she returned to the foreign department, serving as deputy director for APEC from November 2002 to October 2005. Her international postings continued with a four-year stint at the embassy in Rome, where she was counselor for multilateral affairs from November 2005 to June 2008, representing Indonesia to the Food and Agriculture Organization, and later as counselor for economic affairs from July 2008 to December 2009. During her stint in Rome, she chaired of the IFAD Evaluation Committee from 2007 to 2009, becoming the first woman to held the office.

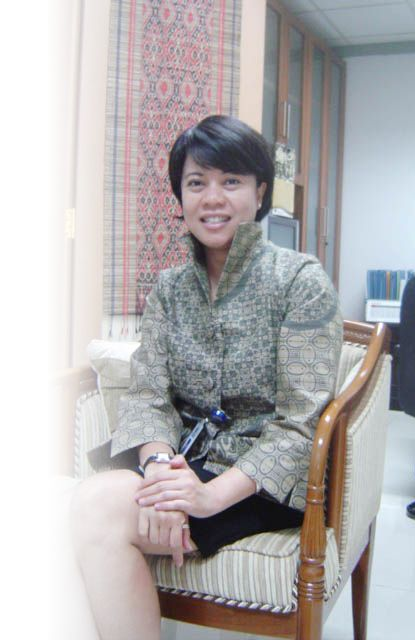
Siti as the director of technical cooperation.

Upon her return to Jakarta, she briefly served as deputy director for a few months in 2010. Around this time, she visited Kabul, Afghanistan, for a post-war conference, during which she faced threats of IEDs despite being in an armored car. Siti was then appointed as the acting director for technical cooperation on 30 May 2011 before assuming the post permanently on 3 March 2011. The relatively new directorate, which was just four years old at that time, was part of the-then emerging South–South cooperation, in which Indonesia acts as both a recipient and a provider of assistance to developing nations. Under her leadership, the directorate's work expanded from a few capacity building programs for developing countries to numerous internal capacity building programs to prepare Indonesians for the South–South cooperation, such as English language training for Indonesian experts. Other than the programs, the directorate was involved in compiling a national South–South cooperation database, approaching local governments, and developing public-private-partnership cooperation. To increase accountability and awareness to the general public, the directorate began publishing a bulletin in 2014. The directorate also approached institutions such as the World Bank, IMF, ADB, Gate Foundation, and other private institution to sought opportunities for triangular operation due to a lack of available funds. She served as director for an approximately six-year stint until July 2016.

Following her directorship, she was appointed consul general in Shanghai on 23 August 2016, serving until February 2019. In September 2018, President Joko Widodo named Siti as a nominee for ambassador to Poland. After passing an assessment held by the House of Representative's first commission in October, on 7 January 2019 she was installed as ambassador. She presented her credentials to President Andrzej Duda on 20 March.

Due to the COVID-19 pandemic in Poland at that time, plans to celebrate bilateral relations anniversary had to be canceled, with only a single photo exhibition being held in February 2020. The embassy took steps through expanding its hotlines, intensifying public outreach, and facilitating the return of Indonesian citizens through special flights under the LotDoDomu program held by the LOT Polish Airlines. Under his leadership, the embassy also sought to protect Indonesians by distributing vital supplies by request, sheltering Indonesians, and provided psychological support. The embassy continued its diplomatic functions through online platforms despite movement restrictions.

Upon serving as ambassador, Siti returned to the foreign ministry to take office as senior advisor (expert staff) to foreign minister Retno Marsudi for socio-cultural affairs and diaspora empowerment on 27 October 2020. She then assumed office as director general for information and public diplomacy on 6 October 2023, in which she was responsible for leveraging artificial intelligence for information dissemination, strengthening public dialogue, and enhancing the role of the Indonesian diaspora globally. She was also tasked with utilizing recipients of Indonesia's art and culture scholarship to act as cultural bridges between Indonesia and neighboring countries.

In August 2024, President Joko Widodo nominated Siti as Indonesia's ambassador to Denmark, with concurrent accreditation to Lithuania. She passed a fit and proper test held by the House of Representative's first commission in September that year. She was installed by President Prabowo Subianto on 24 March 2025 and presented her credentials to the King of Denmark Frederik X on 9 September 2025 and President of Lithuania Gitanas Nausėda on 19 November 2025.

== Personal life ==
Siti is married to Gino Hedianto.
