= Luhulima =

Luhulima is a Moluccan surname. Notable people with the surname include:

- Anita Lidya Luhulima (1967 - 2025), Indonesian diplomat
- Ming Luhulima, Indonesian composer
