= Listyowati =

Indonesian diplomat (born 1965)

Ambassador of Indonesia to Bangladesh
- Incumbent
- Assumed office 8 October 2025
- Preceded by: Heru Hartanto Subolo

Personal details
- Born: 5 January 1965 (age 61)
- Education: University of Indonesia (S.H.)

Listyowati (born 5 January 1965) is an Indonesian diplomat who is serving as ambassador to Bangladesh and Nepal since 2025. Previously, she served as deputy chief of mission in Beijing and consul general in Chicago.

== Biography ==
Born on 5 January 1965, Listyowati began studying law at the University of Indonesia in 1984. She joined the foreign department in March 1991. In 2012, she was appointed as the director for South and Central Asia within the foreign ministry. She advocated for a "integrated and aggressive" approach on Indonesia's trade promotion in Central Asia and offered wood furnitures to be marketed in the region. After an approximately two-year term, she was re-appointed to the position on 10 January 2014.

In 2017, Listyowati assumed duties as the deputy chief of mission at the embassy in Beijing. On 1 December 2017, ambassador Sugeng Rahardjo ended his term and she became the chargé d'affaires ad interim. She oversaw the appointment of embassy officials as members of the overseas election committee in preparation for the 2019 general election. She served as chargé d'affaires ad interim until the arrival of the new ambassador Djauhari Oratmangun on 23 April 2018 and continued to serve as deputy chief of mission until 16 January 2020. One of the cases that Listyowati actively handled is mail-order brides, which has increased significantly during her posting there. The embassy, which repatriated 40 Indonesian women in 2019, had to convert part of its building into a shelter due to the high number of cases.

Upon her return, Listyowati became the supervisor of the foreign ministry's Center for American and European Regional Policy Strategy (Pusat Strategi Kebijakan Kawasan Amerika dan Eropa, Pusat SKK Amerop). During her tenure, she authored a tourism booklet in collaboration with University of Indonesia's School of Strategic Studies.

On 29 May 2023, Listyowati became the consul general in Chicago. On 8 January 2025, the consulate general became the place of the first remote civil witness examination conducted by a court. The witness testified from the consulate general, while the trial was held at the Slawi district court, which has a 13-hour difference. About three weeks later, on 31 January Listyowati ended her tenure as consul general. Listyowati was then nominated for ambassador to Bangladesh and Nepal by President Prabowo Subianto in July 2025. Her nomination was approved by the House of Representatives in a session on 8 July 2025. She was installed as ambassador on 8 October 2025. He received her duties as ambassador from chargé d'affaires ad interim Wahyu Riadi and handed over her copy of credentials to the Bangladesh foreign ministry chief of protocol, Md. Nural Islam, on 19 January 2026 upon arrival two days prior. She presented her credentials to president Mohammed Shahabuddin of Bangladesh on 23 January 2026 and president Ram Chandra Paudel of Nepal on 14 October 2026.
