= Grata Endah Werdaningtyas =

Indonesian diplomat (born 1973)

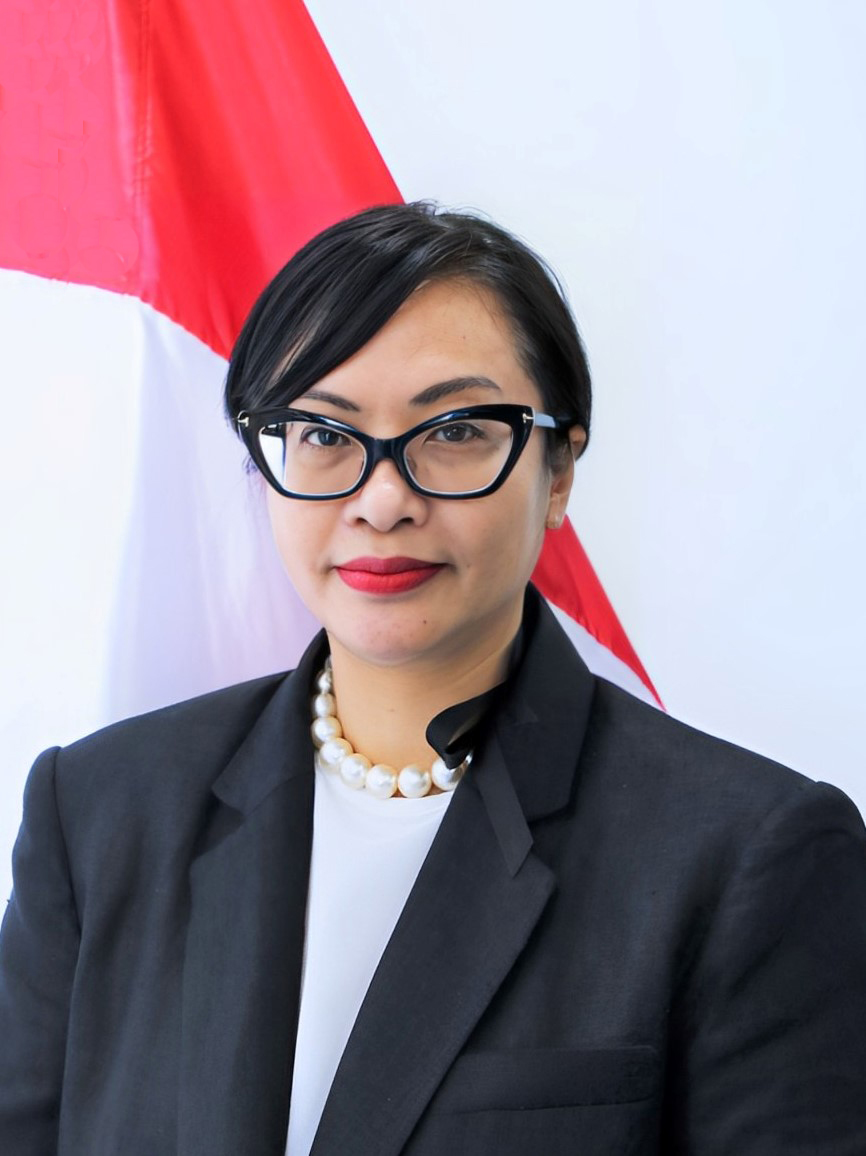

Director General of America and Europe
- Incumbent
- Assumed office 18 December 2025
- Preceded by: Umar Hadi; Kamapradipta Isnomo (acting)

Ambassador of Indonesia to Laos
- In office 28 September 2023 – 27 February 2026
- Preceded by: Pratito Soeharyo
- Succeeded by: Achmad Dahlan (acting)

Personal details
- Born: 3 July 1973 (age 52)
- Education: Parahyangan Catholic University (SIP); University of Indonesia (M.Si.)

Grata Endah Werdaningtyas (born 3 July 1973) is an Indonesian diplomat who is currently serving as director general of America and Europe since 2025. She previously served as director for international security and disarmament from 2017 to 2020, deputy representative to the United Nations in Geneva from 2020 to 2023, and ambassador to Laos from 2023 to 2026.

== Early life and education ==
Born on 3 July 1973, Grata completed her higher education at the Parahyangan Catholic University, majoring in international relations. She completed her master's studies on the same major at the University of Indonesia with a thesis on the United Kingdom's refusal to join the Eurozone.

== Career ==
Grata's diplomatic stint began in October 1997. She began her career at the foreign ministry's directorate for multilateral economic cooperation in 1999, before being posted two years later at the embassy in London with the rank of third secretary. During her tenure, Grata handled media and socio-cultural affairs as well as a protocol and consular officer. He handled matters relating to the protection of Indonesian citizens in United Kingdom and Ireland, countries under the jurisdiction of the embassy.

Grata returned to Indonesia in 2004 as the chief of Asia Pacific and Africa division of the foreign minister's office. She was responsible in providing briefs on the region to Hassan Wirajuda, the foreign minister at that time. By 2008, she was further promoted as a first secretary, with posting at the permanent mission to the United Nations in New York. She negotiated on behalf of Indonesia pertraining issues on promotion and protection of the rights of women, children, migrant workers,minorities and other vulnerable groups. Around this period, in 2011 she was elected as vice president of the UNICEF executive board, representing the Asia group.

Grata returned to the foreign ministry after her tenure in the permanent mission and was appointed as deputy director (chief of subdirectorate) for rights of vulnerable group in the foreign ministry's directorate for human rights and humanitarian affairs in 2013. She was responsible for matters relating to women, children, and other disenfranchised groups. In her capacity, her subdirectorate regularly collaborates with international organizations such as the UN, OIC, ASEAN and led the contribution of the foreign ministry in major initiatives on human rights and humanitarian affairs, including efforts to end sexual violence in conflict.

On 10 August 2017, Grata became the director for international security and disarmament in the foreign ministry. During her tenure, she oversaw Indonesia's non-permanent membership at the United Nations Security Council, leading the task force established for the purpose. She also held several additional positions, such as the supervisor of the Jakarta Center for Law Enforcement Cooperation, Co-chair of the Working Group on Countering Violent Extremism, Global Counter-Terrorism Forum, and Head of Secretariat of the National Coordinating Team for Peacekeeping Mission.

On 9 September 2020, Grata became the deputy permanent representative at the permanent mission to the United Nations in Geneva with the rank of ambassador. Following the election of permanent representative Hasan Kleib as deputy director general of the World Intellectual Property Organization in December that year, Grata assumed duties as the mission's chargé d'affaires for approximately thirteen months until December 2021. During the COVID-19 pandemic, Grata became the representative of the WHO South-East Asia Region to the Bureau of the Working Group on Amendments to the International Health Regulations. She co-authored an article regarding the pandemic with Viroj Tangcharoensathien, Secretary General of International Health Policy Program Foundation. Within the United Nations organizations, she was the co-chair of the Working Group on the Strengthening WHO preparedness and response to health emergencies (WGPR) from 2021 to 2022 and Vice Chair of the Working Group on the Amendment to the International Health Regulations (WGIHR) from 2022 to 2023.

In December 2022, Grata was nominated as ambassador to Laos by President Joko Widodo. After passing an assessment by the house of representative's first commission the next month, she was sworn in as ambassador on 26 June 2023. She arrived in Laos on 2 August 2023 and officially received her duties as ambassador from chargé d'affaires ad interim Rumondang Sumartiani five days later. She presented her credentials to president of Laos Thongloun Sisoulith on 28 September.

On 18 December 2025, Grata was sworn in as the director general of America and Europe.
