= Dewa Made Juniarta Sastrawan =

Indonesian diplomat (born 1961)

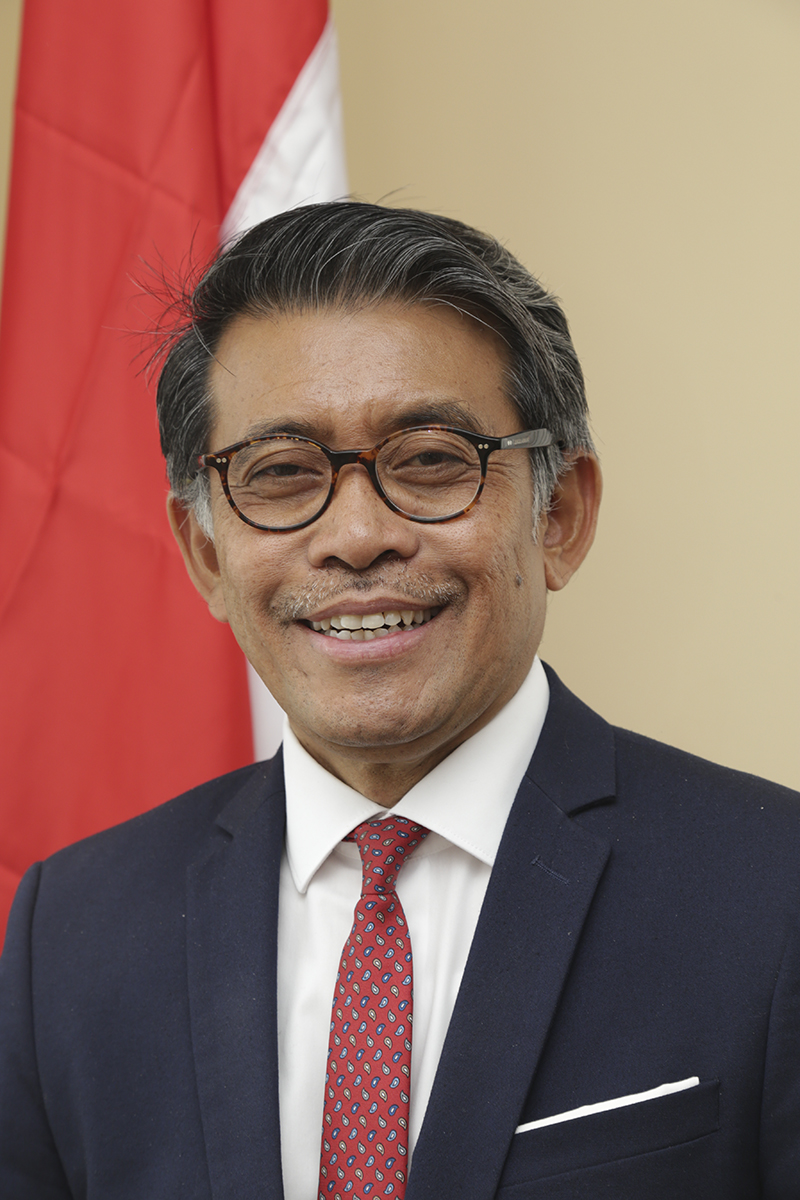

Ambassador of Indonesia to Zimbabwe and Zambia
- In office 7 January 2019 – 27 February 2025
- President: Joko Widodo; Prabowo Subianto
- Preceded by: Stephanus Yuwono
- Succeeded by: Arief Hidayat

Ambassador of Indonesia to Sweden and Latvia
- In office 21 December 2011 – 2015
- President: Susilo Bambang Yudhoyono; Joko Widodo
- Preceded by: Linggawaty Hakim
- Succeeded by: Bagas Hapsoro

Personal details
- Born: April 16, 1961 (age 64) Patemon, Seririt, Buleleng, Bali
- Spouse: Desak Agung Mei Herawati
- Children: 3
- Education: Udayana University (S.E.); Flinders University (MA); SOAS University of London (MPhil)

Dewa Made Juniarta Sastrawan (born 16 April 1961) is an Indonesian diplomat who has served in several senior diplomatic posts, including as an ambassador for Sweden and Latvia from 2012 to 2016 and as ambassador to Zimbabwe and Latvia from 2019 to 2025.

== Early life ==
Born on 16 April 1961 in Patemon Village, Seririt District, Buleleng, Bali, Sastrawan is the eldest of four siblings born to Bagus Made Rai and Ayu Putu Yuniarthi. He attended Singaraja 1st Middle School and Denpasar 1st Middle School before completing his secondary education at 1st Singaraja State High School. He studied economics at Udayana University and graduated in 1985, although his graduation ceremony was held in January 1986. A month into his graduation, he became a speaker at an ASEAN tourism seminar held in Jakarta; his lucid and engaging speaking style at the foreign department-held seminar caught the attention of the department, which invited him to apply for a diplomat position. After passing the selection test in February 1986, he began his basic diplomatic education in Jakarta in April 1986, officially starting his career at the foreign department that year. During his tenure in the foreign ministry, Sastrawan received his master's degree in international relations from the Flinders University in 2000 and a Master of Philosophy program in media studies at the SOAS University of London in 2006.

== Diplomatic career ==
Sastrawan began his foreign service career as chief of the United Nations Economic and Social Council section within the directorate for multilateral economic cooperation from 1988 to 1990. He received his maiden overseas assignment at the first economic section of the permanent mission to the United Nations in New York with the rank of third secretary from 1990 to 1994. Upon returning to Indonesia, he was assigned as the chief of leadership services within the foreign ministry's secretariat general from 1994 to 1995, followed by a tenure as chief of patent and services within the directorate of multilateral economic cooperation from 1995 to 1996. Upon completing mid-level diplomatic education in 1996, he was then posted to head the economic section of the consulate general in Hong Kong from 1996 to 2000. After completing his master's degree, he served as deputy director (chief of subdirectorate) for Europe within the directorate of international trade from 2001 to 2002 and deputy director for APEC from 2002 to 2004. Between his deputy directorships, he completed senior diplomatic education in 2002.

Sastrawan was posted at the embassy in London as chief of the economic section with the rank of minister-counsellor from 2004 to 2006 before being promoted as the embassy's deputy chief of mission in 2007. On 24 April 2008, Sastrawan was sworn in as the director of West Europe in the foreign department, serving until 2011. Sastrawan then served as ambassador to Sweden and Latvia from 2012 to 2016. After the end of his ambassadorial tenure, transport minister Ignasius Jonan appointed him as special advisor (special staff) for international relations, with approval from foreign minister Retno Marsudi. He was installed on 5 January 2016, serving until 2018.

Sastrawan was then nominated by President Joko Widodo as ambassador to Zimbabwe, with concurrent accreditation to Zambia. Upon passing an examination by the House of Representative's first commission in October 2018, Sastrawan was installed on 7 January 2019. As ambassador, Sastrawan pushed to strengthen cooperation and increase Indonesian exports, assist both countries in developing community health centers and integrated service posts, and assist Zimbabwe through state-owned companies. During the COVID-19 pandemic, Sastrawan ensured that all Indonesian citizens in Zimbabwe and Zambia were monitored and communicated with the embassy via WhatsApp, with the embassy strictly implementing health protocols and distributing aid to affected citizens.

After his tenure in 2025, Sastrawan advocated for Indonesia to establish its own direct representation, such as a consulate general, in Zambia instead of having the function concurrently handled by the embassy in Harare, Zimbabwe. He cited the need for direct protection for the approximately 150 Indonesian workers in Zambia and the difficulty of service due to the 22-hour overland journey or irregular flight connections between Harare and the workers' locations near the unstable Zambia and Democratic Republic of Congo border. He also noted a consulate general could increase non-tax state revenue collection.

== Personal life ==
Sastrawan is married to Desak Agung Mei Herawati Hana Sastrawan and has three children.
