= Kamapradipta Isnomo =

Indonesian diplomat (born 1972)

Director General of Information and Public Diplomacy
- Acting
- Assumed office 1 October 2026
- Preceded by: Heru Hartanto Subolo

Director General of America and Europe
- Acting
- In office 21 October 2025 – 18 December 2025
- Preceded by: Umar Hadi
- Succeeded by: Grata Endah Werdaningtyas

Ambassador of Indonesia to Sweden and Latvia
- In office 14 September 2020 – 28 February 2025
- President: Joko Widodo; Prabowo Subianto
- Preceded by: Bagas Hapsoro
- Succeeded by: Yayan Ganda Hayat Mulyana

Personal details
- Born: 6 March 1972 (age 54) Indonesia
- Spouse: Ria Rafika Sari (m. 2006)
- Children: 3
- Education: Webster University (BA); University of Leeds (MA)
- Nickname: Kama

Kamapradipta Isnomo (born 6 March 1972), also known by the nickname Kama, is an Indonesian diplomat who is serving as advisor to the foreign minister for socio-cultural affairs and human development since 2025 as well as the acting director general of information and public diplomacy. A Webster University graduate, he briefly worked in journalism before joining the foreign ministry. Prior to his current position, he was Indonesia's ambassador to Sweden and Latvia from 2020 to 2025.

== Early life and education ==
Kamapradipta was born on 6 March 1972. He received a double bachelor's degree in media communication and international relations from the Webster University in 1992. He pursued master's studies in political science at the Leeds University after joining the foreign ministry and graduated in 1999.

== Diplomatic career ==
Kamapradipta was briefly involved in journalism upon graduating, working for TVRI as a broadcaster and reporter and as a freelance reporter to some periodicals. He joined the foreign ministry in March 1995, receiving his first overseas assignment as a vice consul at the consulate general in Melbourne for four years from 2001 to 2005. In 2002, Kamapradipta criticized sudden raids conducted by Australian authorities to Indonesians residing in Australia under the pretext of investigating their links to Abu Bakar Ba'asyir, the head of the Jemaah Islamiyah organization which carried out the 2002 Bali bombings.

From Melbourne, Kamapradipta was sent to Indonesia's permanent mission in Geneva with the diplomatic rank of first secretary from 2007 to 2011. He represented Indonesia at the United Nations Human Rights Council (UNHRC) and other human rights-related bodies, such as the Committee Against Torture, Convention on the Rights of the Child, International Covenant on Economic, Social and Cultural Rights, and the International Committee of the Red Cross. During Indonesia's membership in the UNHRC from 2008 to 2010, Kamapradipta oversaw Indonesia's maiden Universal Periodic Review in the UNHRC, with Indonesia being one of the earliest to submit its report, and played a role in developing UNHRC's institutional capacity. Following the 2010 Gaza flotilla raid, Kamapradipta represented Indonesia in UNHRC's urgent debate that followed the incident. The resulting nine-point resolution included two points from Indonesia, which demanded the UNHRC president to form a fact finding team to investigate Israel's action and for Israel to cooperate with the Red Cross to ensure the safety and well-being of all arrested flotilla participants.

Kamapradipta returned to the foreign ministry with his appointment as deputy director (chief of subdirectorate) for Asia-Pacific Economic Cooperation (APEC), serving from 2011 to 2014. He was responsible for negotiations and became a member of the advisory committee during Indonesia's APEC chairmanship in 2013. Following his stint as deputy director, Kamapradipta was assigned to the permanent mission in New York, in charge of coordinating political affairs with the rank of minister counsellor. Kamapradipta was elected as the deputy chairman of the United Nations General Assembly First Committee in 2016, during which he led the committee's approval on the resolution for the renegotiation of the Treaty on the Prohibition of Nuclear Weapons.

On 10 August 2017, Kamapradipta received a promotion with his appointment as director for social, cultural, and international organizations of developing countries in the foreign ministry. In May 2020, Kamapradipta was nominated as ambassador to Sweden and Latvia by President Joko Widodo. After passing an assessment by the house of representative's first commission the next month, he officially assumed office on 14 September 2020. He arrived in Sweden on 29 October before introducing himself virtually to Indonesian citizens living in Sweden dan Latvia on 7 November.

Due to the ongoing COVID-19 pandemic in Sweden around the time of his arrival, Kamapradipta could not immediately present his letters of credence to King of Sweden Carl XVI Gustaf. Sweden's chief of protocol Maria Christina Lundqvist received the credentials in place of Carl XVI Gustaf on 19 November 2020. A courtesy call with Carl XVI Gustaf took place on 26 August 2021 as pandemic conditions improved, with talks on cooperation between the two nations in trade, health, defense, and energy. He presented his credentials to the President of Latvia Egils Levits on 5 October 2021.

Kamapradipta paid a farewell visit to Carl XVI Gustaf on 25 February 2025 before handing over his duties to chargé d'affaires ad interim Gita Loka Murti three days later. He was then installed as the advisor to the foreign minister for socio-cultural affairs and human development on 17 September 2025. On 21 October, he became the acting director general of America and Europe following the appointment of the prior officeholder, Umar Hadi, as permanent representative to the United Nations. He was accorded another additional duty as the acting director general of information and public diplomacy following the retirement of Heru Hartanto Subolo from the civil service on 1 October 2026.

== Personal life ==
Kamapradipta is married to Ria Rafika Sari in 2006 and has three daughters.
