= Agus Priono =

Indonesian diplomat (born 1967)

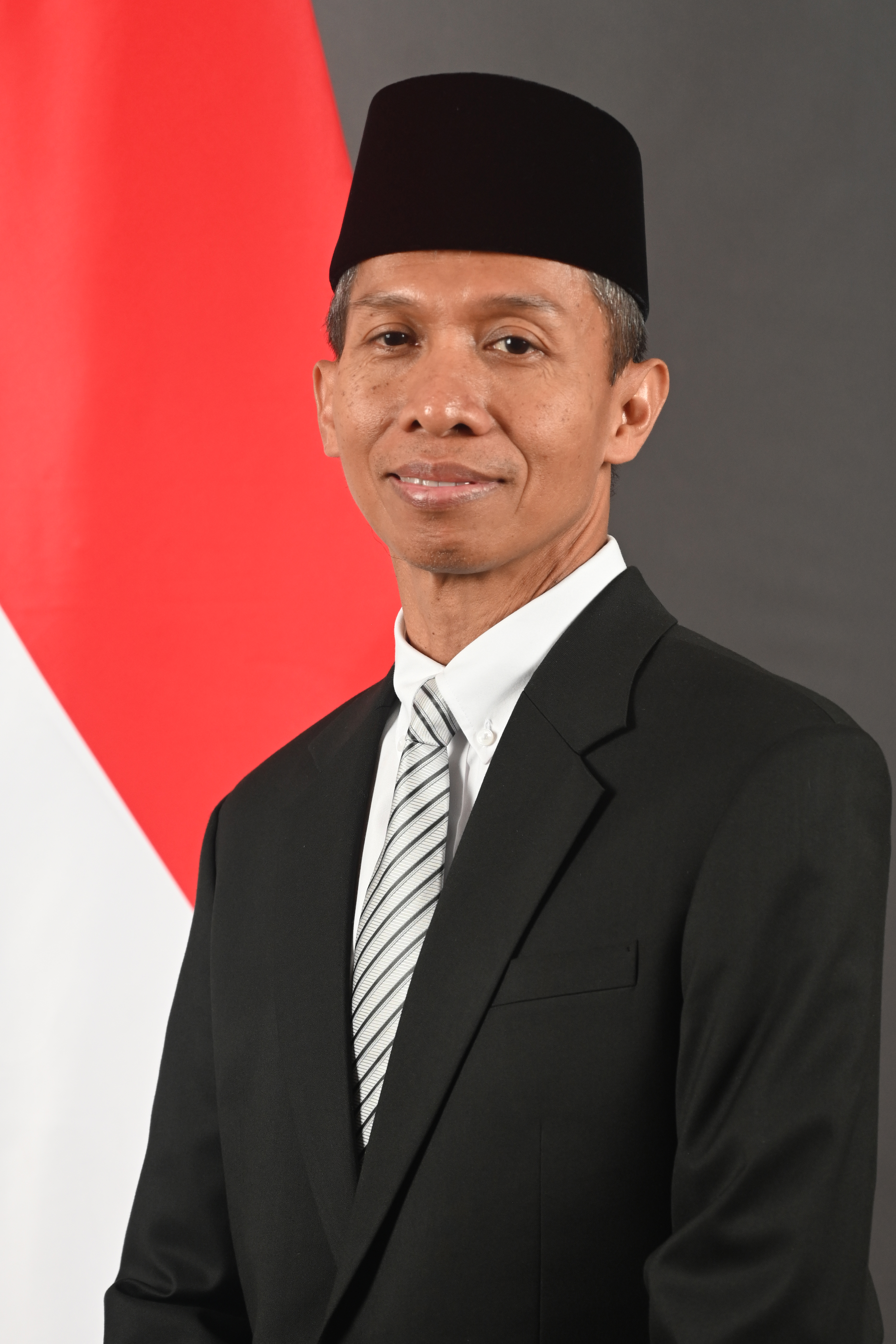

Ambassador of Indonesia to Suriname and Guyana
- Incumbent
- Assumed office 24 March 2025
- President: Prabowo Subianto
- Preceded by: Julang Pujianto

Chief of Permits and Investment Service of Yogyakarta
- In office 3 August 2020 – May 2025
- Preceded by: Arief Hidayat
- Succeeded by: Imam Pratanadi (acting); Abdul Ghofar Ismail

Personal details
- Born: November 10, 1967 (age 58)
- Spouse: Etny Puji Rahayu
- Education: Gadjah Mada University (S.E.); Macquarie University (M.Ec.)

Agus Priono (born 10 November 1967) is an Indonesian diplomat who is serving as the ambassador to Suriname and Guyana since 24 March 2025.

== Early life and education ==
Agus was born on 10 November 1967. He received his bachelor's degree in development economics from the Gadjah Mada University in 1993 and master's degree in economics from the Macquarie University in Sydney.

== Career ==
Agus began his service in the foreign ministry in August 1993. He was assigned to the embassy in Bangkok with the rank of second secretary and later to the public relations, culture, and tourism section of the embassy in Berlin with the rank of first secretary and later counsellor. He was then assigned to the consulate general in Penang as the chief of economic section and head of chancellery. During his assignment in Penang, he also briefly became the acting consul general.

Upon serving in Penang, Agus returned to the foreign ministry to serve as the chief of non-diplomatic training and education section. After passing a series of assessments, on 3 August 2020 Agus was appointed as the chief of permits and investment service in the Yogyakarta provincial government. During his tenure, on 1 August 2024 Agus was named as the acting chief of Yogyakarta's tourism agency, replacing Singgih Raharjo who resigned to ran as Yogyakarta mayor.

In August 2024, President Joko Widodo nominated Agus as Indonesia's ambassador to Suriname, with concurrent accreditation to Guyana. He passed a fit and proper test held by the House of Representative's first commission in September that year and was installed by President Prabowo Subianto on 24 March 2025. Shortly after his installation, he and five other new ambassadors from UGM met with UGM rector Ova Emilia and Yogyakarta governor Hamengkubuwono X. He presented his credentials to the President of Suriname Chan Santokhi on 26 June 2025, President of Guyana Irfaan Ali on 18 November 2025, and secretary general of the Caribbean Community Carla Barnett on 19 November 2025.

== Personal life ==
Agus is married to Etny Puji Rahayu.
