= Damos Dumoli Agusman =

Indonesian diplomat

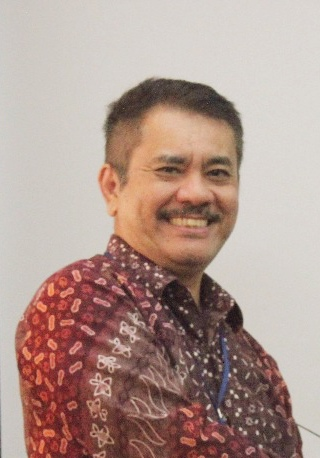

Ambassador of Indonesia to Austria, Slovenia and International Organizations in Vienna
- In office 17 November 2021 – incumbent
- President: Joko Widodo
- Minister: Retno Marsudi

Director-General of International Law and Treaties
- In office 15 September 2017 – 27 April 2022
- President: Joko Widodo
- Minister: Retno Marsudi
- Preceded by: Ferry Adamhar
- Succeeded by: Laurentius Amrih Jinangkung

Personal details
- Born: Damos Dumoli Agusman; August 4, 1963 (age 62) West Aceh, Indonesia
- Education: Padjadjaran University (SH); University of Hull (MA); Goethe University Frankfurt (Dr.iur.)

Damos Dumoli Agusman (born 4 August 1963) is an Indonesian diplomat. He currently serves as Ambassador to Austria, Slovenia and International Organizations in Vienna.

== Early life ==
Agusman was born in Aceh. He graduated from the Faculty of Law of Padjadjaran University in 1987, writing a senior thesis about the law of treaties concluded by international organizations. While in law school, he served as a research assistant to future Supreme Court justice Mieke Komar Kantaatmadja. He later earned his master's degree from the University of Hull in 1991 and doctoral degree from Goethe University Frankfurt in 2014; the latter which he earned magna cum laude after defending his dissertation "The Legal Status of Treaties under Indonesian Law: A Comparative Study of China, South Africa, Germany and the Netherlands".

== Career ==
Agusman joined the Ministry of Foreign Affairs in 1988. He began his career as a Second Secretary at the Indonesian Embassy in the Hague, the Netherlands (1993-1997) during which he attended the Hague Academy of International Law in 1994. He was later assigned as a Counsellor at the Indonesian Permanent Mission to the United Nations in Vienna. During the tenure, he studied at the doctorate program at the University of Vienna, but did not finish it. He was part of the Indonesian team that represented the country during Ligitan and Sipadan dispute at the International Court of Justice.

From 2006 to 2010, Agusman served as Director of Economic, Social, and Cultural Treaties at the Foreign Ministry in Jakarta, responsible for leading Indonesian negotiation teams at free trade agreement negotiations. On 30 July 2010, he was posted as a Consul-General in Frankfurt. Under Retno Marsudi, he was appointed as Secretary of the Directorate-General of International Law and Treaties on 10 January 2014, before being promoted as Director-General on 15 September 2017 following Ferry Adamhar's appointment as ambassador to Greece.

In July 2021, Agusman was nominated as the next Indonesian Ambassador to Austria, Slovenia, and United Nations Office at Vienna.

Beside his diplomatic career, Agusman has also taught international law at the law schools of Padjadjaran University, University of Indonesia, and Pelita Harapan University.

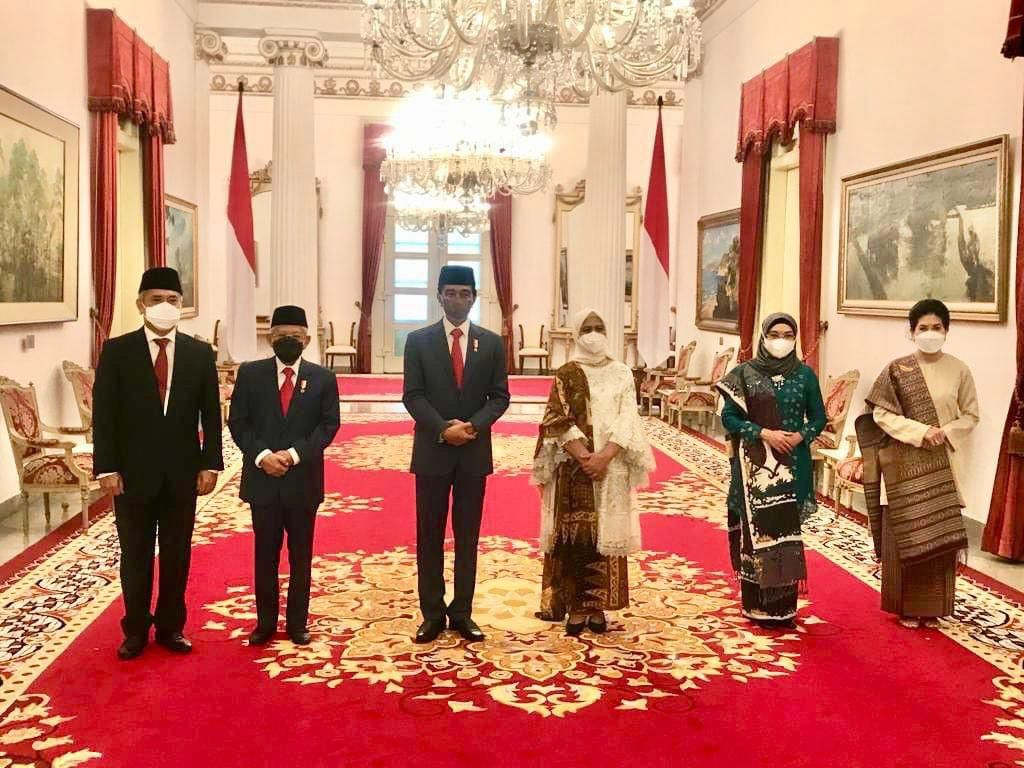
Agusman after his inauguration as Ambassador with the President, First Lady, Vice President, and their wives
