= Bagas Hapsoro =

Indonesian diplomat (born 1958)

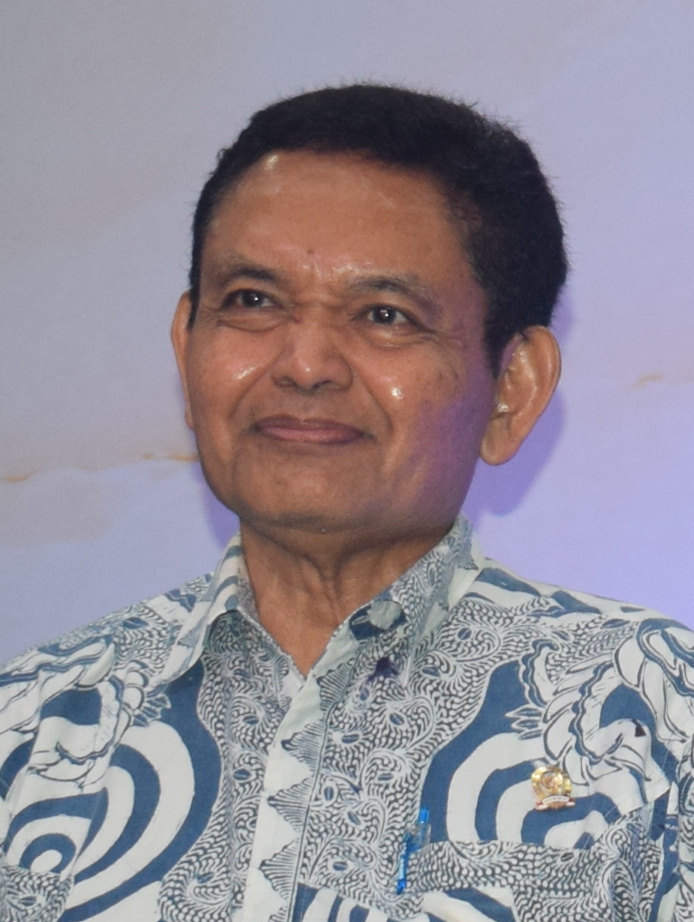
- Hapsoro in 2025

Ambassador of Indonesia to Sweden and Latvia
- In office 23 December 2015 – 30 June 2020
- President: Joko Widodo
- Preceded by: Dewa Made Juniarta Sastrawan
- Succeeded by: Kamapradipta Isnomo

Deputy Secretary General of ASEAN for Community and Corporate Affairs
- In office 7 December 2009 – December 2012
- Preceded by: Office established
- Succeeded by: Ahmad Kurnia Prawira Mochtan

Ambassador of Indonesia to Lebanon
- In office 5 September 2007 – 28 February 2010
- President: Susilo Bambang Yudhoyono
- Preceded by: Abdullah Syarwani
- Succeeded by: Dimas Samodra Rum

Personal details
- Born: 8 August 1958 (age 68) Yogyakarta, Indonesia
- Spouse: Sumaningsih Retno Savitri
- Children: 2
- Parent: Santoso Pujosubroto (father)
- Education: University of Indonesia (S.H.); St. John's University (MA)

Raden Bagas Hapsoro (born 8 August 1958) is an Indonesian career diplomat. A law graduate from the University of Indonesia, Bagas held roles in both bilateral and multilateral diplomacy, dealing with economic issues, security, and international cooperation. Bagas served as Indonesian ambassador to Sweden and Latvia from 2015 to 2020 and to Lebanon from 2007 to 2010. He also served in ASEAN as the deputy secretary general for community and corporate affairs from 2009 to 2013 and in the foreign ministry as advisor for management affairs from 2014 to 2015.

== Early life and education ==
Born in Yogyakarta on 8 August 1958, Bagas is the son of Santoso Pujosubroto, a judge who later became the deputy chairman of the Supreme Court of Indonesia. He spent most of his childhood in Padang, where his father was stationed shortly after his birth. In Padang, he lived near the local Radio Republik Indonesia office. He attended the Alang Lawas Padang elementary school in 1970. Upon finishing high school, he studied law with a specialization in public international law at the University of Indonesia and graduated in 1982. During his first diplomatic posting in New York, he pursued a master's degree in law and macro-economic policies at St. John's University from 1987 until his graduation in 1991.

== Career ==
Bagas began his career as a civil servant at the Agency for the Assessment and Application of Technology (Badan Pengkajian dan Penerapan Teknologi, BPPT), but left the agency after six months to apply for the foreign department. He was accepted and undertook basic diplomatic course in 1984. His initial career was at the economic affairs section of the permanent mission to the United Nations in New York from 1986 to 1991, with the rank of third secretary. He was then posted to head the economic section of the consulate general in Houston from 1994 to 1995. In Houston, Bagas was responsible for handling bilateral economic issues.

Subsequently, he was crossposted back to New York to serve at the permanent mission to the United Nations in New York, where he was entrusted as the deputy head of the first economic section with the rank of counsellor until 1999. After completing his mid-level diplomatic education in 1999 and senior diplomatic education in 2001, he was promoted to the rank of minister counsellor and served as the head of the second economic section at the permanent mission in Geneva. During his tenure, he handled matters under the purview of the World Trade Organization, where he led negotiations for the Group of 77 in matters relating to environment, commodities, and international financial institutions. He was the vice chairman of the non-agriculture market access (industrial tariff) in 2003 and chairman of the Group of 33 for the negotiation on agriculture from 2003 to 2004.

From March 2004 to December 2005, Hapsoro returned to Jakarta to serve as the secretary to the directorate general of ASEAN cooperation. On 28 December 2005, Bagas became the director for ASEAN dialogue partner and intra-regional affairs in the foreign ministry. He chaired the negotiation of the ASEAN Agreement on Disaster Management and Emergency Response in Bali in 2005 and led the Indonesian delegation to the ASEAN Convention on Counter Terrorism in Manila in 2006.

=== Ambassador to Lebanon ===
Bagas was sworn in as the ambassador to Lebanon on 5 September 2007. He presented his credentials to the President of Lebanon Émile Lahoud on 6 November 2007. During his tenure as ambassador, Bagas was involved in promoting cultural exchange, including hosting the Ramayana Ballet in 2008 and facilitating Indonesian participation in the Kahlil Gibran International Seminar in November 2009. Following the 2009 earthquake in Padang, Hapsoro composed a song titled Padang Don't Lose Your Hope to raise awareness and funds for the victims. According to Bagas, he was able to play the piano and had composed music for years despite lacking knowledge in musical notation or theory. The song, which was performed at a charity event in Beirut, raised US$49,700 and was donated for the rehabilitation of an elementary school affected by the earthquake in Padang.

At the time of his assignment in Lebanon, the Garuda Contingent was being deployed as part of the United Nations Interim Force in Lebanon. UNIFIL's most senior officer, Colonel Surawahadi, stated that Bagas facilitated and supported the contingent in resolving permit and reparation related problems. Bagas also lobbied the Lebanon president Michel Suleiman to allow the presence of Indonesian ships in UNIFIL by correspondence with the Secretary-General of the United Nations. KRI Diponegoro (365) was eventually deployed and served as part of UNIFIL's maritime task force from April to October 2009. For his role in supporting the Garuda Contingent, he was awarded an honorary UN peacekeeping blue beret by contingent commander Restu Widiyantoro in February 2010.

After his appointment as deputy secretary general of ASEAN, he continued to held dual office as ambassador for a few months. In February 2010, he announced his departure to Lebanon officials, including the tourism minister Fadi Abboud, Grand Mufti of Lebanon Mohammed Rashid Qabbani, Kahlil Gibran museum director Antoni Tawk, and Hezbollah chief of international relations Sayyed Ammar Mausawi. He ended his term on 28 February 2010 and was replaced by chargé d'affaires ad interim R.A. Arief.

=== Deputy Secretary General of ASEAN ===
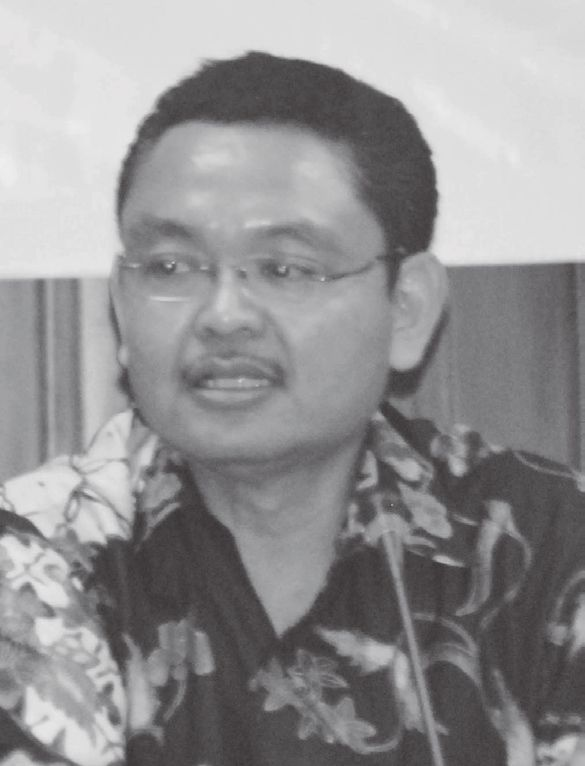
Bagas Hapsoro as the ASEAN deputy secretary general.

In the midst of his term as ambassador to Lebanon, Bagas was offered to apply for the newly formed post of deputy secretary general of ASEAN for community and corporate affairs by the Indonesian foreign ministry. The post was established following the adoption of the ASEAN Charter. Bagas, who competed against 52 other candidates from all 10 ASEAN countries at that time, was selected at the 5th ASEAN Coordinating Council meeting on 22 October 2009. He began his duty on 7 December 2009 and was sworn in exactly a week later on 14 December in Jakarta. Bagas was responsible for managing the systems, procedures and resources of ASEAN secretariat to ensure the fulfillment of its roles and mandates in ASEAN community and charter.

During his tenure, Bagas expressed his hope for Jakarta to "increase in power and relevance", imagining it to become what he described as the 'Brussels of the East' in the future. He received offers from the Indonesian government to expand the secretariat by acquiring neighboring buildings. He served as deputy secretary general until December 2012. Afterwards, he was sworn in as the advisor (expert staff) to the foreign minister for management on 23 April 2014.

=== Ambassador to Sweden and Latvia ===
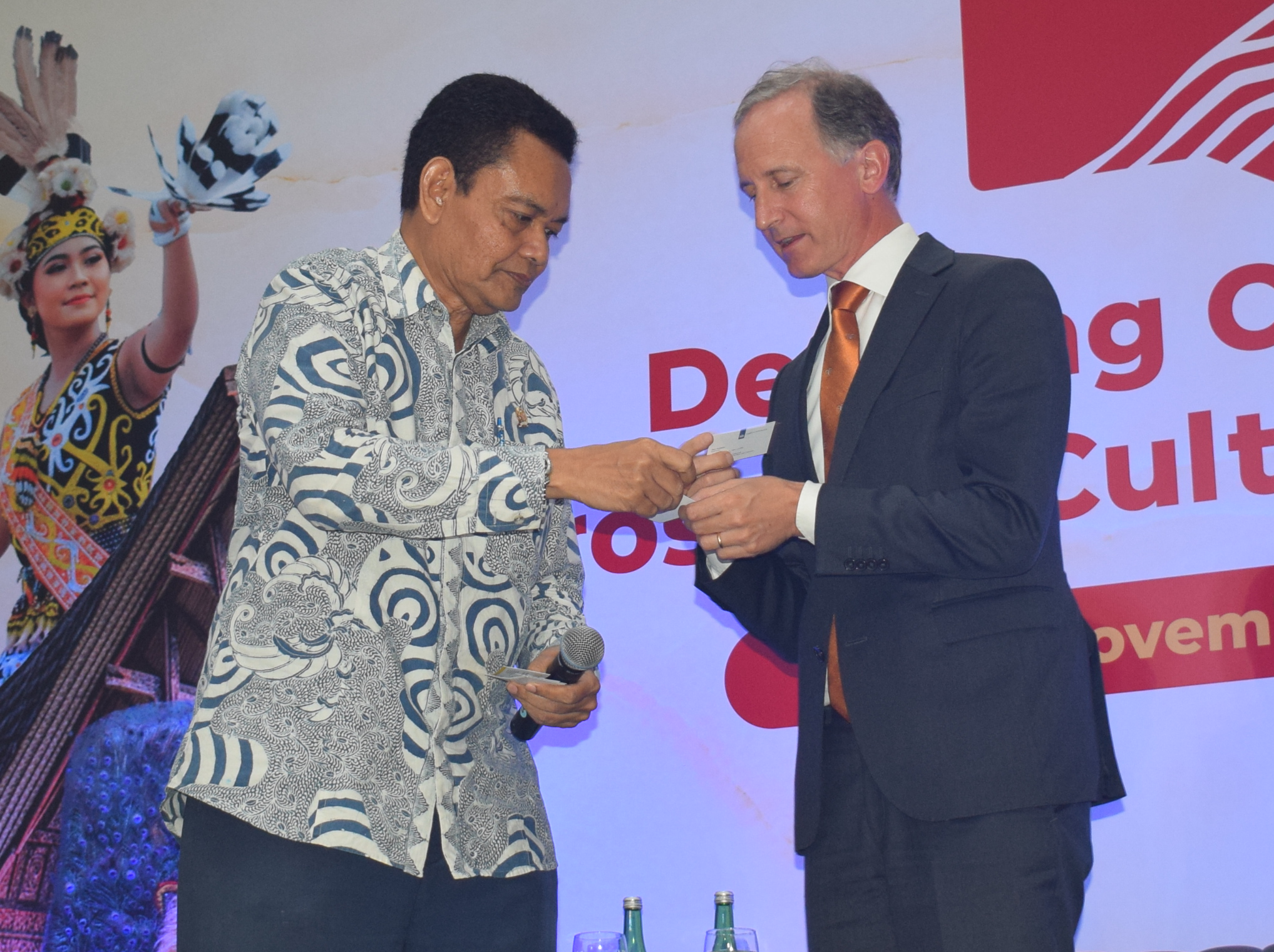
Bagas Hapsoro exchanging namecards with the Dutch ambassador to Indonesia Marc Gerritsen.

On 6 August 2015, Bagas was nominated as ambassador to Sweden and Latvia by President Joko Widodo. After undergoing an assessment by the House of Representatives's first commission in September 2015, Bagas was installed on 23 December 2015. He presented his credentials to the King of Sweden Carl XVI Gustaf on 15 March 2016 and to the President of Latvia Raimonds Vējonis on 19 April 2016. He spearheaded the annual Indonesian Festival from 2016 to 2019 in Stockholm to showcase Indonesian culture, cuisine, and arts. He ended his tenure on 30 June 2020 was replaced by chargé d'affaires ad interim Tanti Widyastuti.

== Personal life ==
Upon his retirement from the diplomatic service, Bagas joined the Indonesian Council on World Affairs and became the chairman of its executive council.

Bagas is married to Sumaningsih Retno Savitri and has two daughters.
