= Ferry Adamhar =

Indonesian diplomat (born 1959)

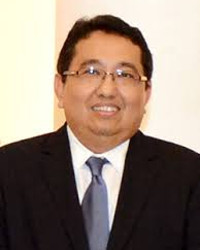

Ambassador of Indonesia to Greece
- In office 18 May 2017 – 2020
- President: Joko Widodo
- Preceded by: Benny Bahanadewa
- Succeeded by: Bebeb Djundjunan

Director General of International Law and Treaties
- In office 23 April 2014 – 15 September 2017
- Preceded by: Linggawaty Hakim
- Succeeded by: Damos Dumoli Agusman

Inspector General of the Foreign Ministry
- Acting
- In office 2015 – 18 March 2016
- Preceded by: Ibnu Said
- Succeeded by: Mayerfas

Ambassador of Indonesia to Kuwait
- In office 10 August 2010 – July 2014
- President: Susilo Bambang Yudhoyono
- Preceded by: Faisal Ismail
- Succeeded by: Tatang Budie Utama Razak

Personal details
- Born: 12 July 1959 (age 67) Jakarta, Indonesia
- Education: Andalas University (S.H.); UC Berkeley School of Law (LL.M.)

Ferry Adamhar (born 12 June 1959) is an Indonesian diplomat who has served as ambassador to Kuwait and ambassador to Greece. He also held senior positions in the foreign ministry, including as the director general of international law and treaties and acting inspector general.

== Early life and education ==
Ferry was born in Jakarta on 12 July 1959. He is of Minang descent. He studied law at the Andalas University and graduated with a bachelor's degree in 1984. He continued his master's on the same subject at the UC Berkeley School of Law in 1995. Following his master's degree, he became a researcher at The Berkeley Roundtable on the International Economy, associated with the UC-Berkeley Institute of International Studies, from 1995 to 1996.

== Diplomatic career ==
Ferry began his career in the foreign service as subsection chief within the international treaties directorate. Ferry was then posted to the permanent mission in Geneva from 1990 to 1993, where he represented Indonesia at international organizations such as the Human Rights Council, the World Trade Organization, and the International Labor Organization.

Upon completing his master's degree and research tenure, he was assigned to the permanent mission in New York, where he served a three-year tenure from 1999 to 2003 as the chief of international treaties. He was a representative of Indonesia at the United Nations General Assembly Sixth Committee, engaging in legal and legislative matters related to multilateral committees and forums. From 2003 to 2004, he became the deputy director (chief of subdirectorate) for management of international treaty texts under the directorate of economic, social, and cultural treaties. During his brief stint as deputy director, Ferry announced Indonesia's intention to register its international treaties to the United Nations.

Ferry was promoted in 2004 to serve as the director for protection of Indonesian citizens and legal entities. During his tenure, he was involved in efforts to free Indonesian citizens kidnapped in Iraq and the Philippines. He also oversaw the expansion of citizen services for Indonesians abroad, with the establishment of citizen services section in five embassies in 2006.

After three years serving as director, Ferry became consul general in Hong Kong. Early in his term, he received visit from vice president Jusuf Kalla. He developed service-based protection for migrant workers in Hong Kong and held crash courses for incoming migrant workers and brief outgoing migrant workers for job opportunities in Indonesia. To accommodate the worker's recreational needs, Ferry initiated a community outreach program and organized cultural nights.

Ferry was installed as ambassador to Kuwait on 10 August 2010. He announced his departure from Hong Kong in September and presented his credentials to the Emir of Kuwait Sabah Al-Ahmad Al-Jaber Al-Sabah in October. Ferry pursued a three-pronged diplomatic strategy focusing on strengthening cultural ties and tourism, enhancing bilateral trade, commerce, and investment, and sharing mutually supportive viewpoints on international and regional issues. He worked to increase direct trade and investment, including facilitating visits by Indonesian and Kuwaiti business delegations, and supported the formation of the Indonesia–Kuwait Business Council. In 2013, Ferry upgraded the embassy's consular section to provide better services for both Indonesian expatriates and Kuwaiti citizens. Further upgrades were done several months later in 2014 with the launching of the embassy's electronic consular system. Ferry's term as ambassador ended in July 2014.

Ferry assumed office as the director general of international law and treaties on 23 April 2014. In the midst of his term, Ferry became the foreign ministry's acting inspector general in 2015, replacing the retiring Ibnu Said. In September 2015, he signed a cooperation agreement with his alma mater, the Andalas University, on international law assessment. Ferry was involved in resolving border issues with Indonesia's neighboring countries. He was replaced by Damos Dumoli Agusman on 15 September 2017.

In November 2016, Ferry was nominated by President Joko Widodo for ambassador to Greece. He passed an assessment by the House of Representative's first commission the next month and was installed on 18 May 2017. He received his duties from the chargé d'affaires ad interim Yophy Ichsan Wardana on 14 June 2017 and presented his credentials to President of Greece Prokopis Pavlopoulos on 20 July 2017. As ambassador, Ferry worked to foster relationship between the two countries, including efforts to increase economic cooperation, such as through a business seminar in February 2019 and participation in exhibitions like the Food Expo in March 2019 and the Thessaloniki International Fair in September of the same year. His efforts also included a focus on promoting Indonesian products like coffee, chocolate, and textiles, which had not yet fully penetrated the Greek market, alongside established products such as palm oil, furniture, and fisheries.
