= Benny Bahanadewa =

Indonesian diplomat (born 1958)

Ambassador of Indonesia to Greece
- In office 3 September 2012 – January 2017
- President: Susilo Bambang Yudhoyono; Joko Widodo
- Preceded by: Ahmad Rusdi
- Succeeded by: Ferry Adamhar

Personal details
- Born: 5 October 1958 (age 67) Yogyakarta, Indonesia
- Education: Islamic University of Indonesia (Drs.); Vrije Universiteit Brussel (MBA); University of Indonesia (M.Si.)

Benny Bahanadewa (born 5 October 1958) is an Indonesian diplomat who last served as ambassador to Greece from 2012 to 2017. Before taking on his ambassadorship in Greece, he previously served as secretary of the directorate general of America and Europe and consul general in Chicago.

== Early life and education ==
Benny was born in Yogyakarta on 5 October 1958. He studied economics at the Islamic University of Indonesia Yogyakarta, where he graduated in 1984. He later pursued advanced studies abroad, earning his master's degree in management economics from the Vrije Universiteit Brussel in 1992 and in European studies at the University of Indonesia in 2008.

== Diplomatic career ==
Benny entered the foreign service in March 1985 and completed his basic diplomatic education in 1986. He began his career as the chief of Asia section within the directorate of technical cooperation and economic services in 1988. The following year, he moved to the embassy in Brussels and served with the rank of attaché, and then promoted to third secretary on the same year.

Upon his return to Jakarta in 1992, he became the deputy director (chief of sub-directorate) of taxation in the directorate of technical cooperation and economic services. Benny undertook several courses on inter-regional studies and American studies at the University of Indonesia before his posting at the economic section of the embassy in Washington D.C. He started at the embassy with the rank rank of second secretary in 1995 before being promoted to the rank of first secretary in 1996. After another stint in Jakarta as deputy director of investment in the directorate of investment and finance in 1997, he completed his mid-level diplomatic education in 1999 and senior diplomatic education in 2000. He was then posted to the embassy in Paris in 2001 with the rank of counsellor before receiving another promotion to minister counsellor in 2002.

In 2005, he returned to Jakarta to serve as the fourth deputy director in the directorate of intra-regional cooperation for America and Europe. After about a year, on 9 November 2006 he became the secretary of the directorate general of America and Europe. Previously, on the same year, Benny had completed a senior diplomatic course at the Netherlands Institute of International Relations Clingendael. As secretary, Benny led the Indonesian delegation at the Bulgaria-Indonesian consultative meeting at the West Nusa Tenggara in 2009.

On 12 December 2009, Benny was installed as consul general in Chicago. He arrived in January 2010 and received his exequatur on 2 February 2010. During his tenure, Benny held a batik exhibition which displayed batik collection of the-then US President Barack Obama's mother, Ann Dunham. The next year, the consulate general also held tourism and art exhibitions aimed at promoting Indonesia.

On 3 September 2012, Benny was installed as ambassador to Greece after being nominated by President Susilo Bambang Yudhoyono and underwent assessment by the House of Representative's first commission in June. He arrived in Greece and took over duties from chargés d'affaires ad interim Abdul Fatah Zainal on 29 October before presenting his credentials to the President of Greece, Karolos Papoulias, on 29 November. He introduced himself to the Indonesian community in Greece on 9 December 2012. During his tenure, Benny explored cooperations with Greece in tourism development and helped free Indonesian illegal migrant workers who were arrested in Greek police raids. He ended his ambassadorial tenure in January 2017. He was briefly assigned at the first European directorate before entering retirement.
