= Kuncoro Giri Waseso =

Indonesian diplomat (born 1965)

Ambassador of Indonesia to Egypt
- Incumbent
- Assumed office 8 October 2025
- President: Prabowo Subianto
- Preceded by: Lutfi Rauf

Personal details
- Born: 18 June 1965 (age 61)
- Spouse: Mantarina Herlianti
- Education: Diponegoro University (Drs.); Victoria University of Wellington

Kuncoro Giri Waseso (born 18 June 1965) is an Indonesian diplomat who is currently serving as ambassador to Egypt since 2025. He previously served as secretary of the directorate general for information and public diplomacy from 2019 to 2021 and consul general in Melbourne from 2021 to 2025.

== Early life and education ==
Kuncoro was born on 18 June 1965 and earned his bachelor's degree in English literature at the Diponegoro University. He later received a master's degree in international relations at the Victoria University of Wellington.

== Career ==
Kuncoro initially wanted to become a bank employee or a lecturer, but joined the foreign department instead in 1993 after seeing an advertisement for the foreign service school. He was posted in Indonesian embassies abroad, including in Dhaka from 1997 to 2001. From 2004 to 2008, he served within the information and cultural affairs section of the embassy in Copenhagen with the rank of first secretary, during which he reported the investigation into the allegations of the embassy being tapped. Kuncoro was then posted to the economic section of the embassy in Bern with the rank of counsellor, where he served as the chargé d'affaires ad interim of the embassy in 2012. In 2018, Kuncoro unsuccessfully applied for the post of chief of Yogyakarta's cooperation and investment agency.

On 22 August 2019, Kuncoro was named as the secretary of the directorate general of information and public diplomacy, serving under director general Cecep Herawan and Teuku Faizasyah. After two years, he was appointed as the consul general in Melbourne on 4 May 2021. Kuncoro began his term in the midst of a lockdown in Melbourne, during which he had to adjust with the situation by introducing virtual methods for activities such as business coaching and linguistic promotions.

Kuncoro stated his focus on economic diplomacy by strengthening trade, investment, and tourism ties between Indonesia and Victoria/Tasmania, soft diplomacy through promoting Indonesian culture to foster mutual understanding and protecting Indonesian citizens through collaboration with the diaspora to support and safeguard Indonesians living in the region. Kuncoro also supported initiatives to strengthen ties by Indonesian Film Festival, Tempo Doeloe, and expressed optimism about integrating Indonesian cultural elements like angklung into Victoria's school curriculum, though noting challenges like instructor availability and infrastructure. Under his tenure, the consulate general oversaw the IA-CEPA agreement (Indonesia Australia Comprehensive Economic Partnership Agreement) implementation and facilitated the Bandung–Melbourne sister city MoU.

In August 2024, Kuncoro was nominated by President Joko Widodo as ambassador to Egypt. However, after several months, he was never summoned by the House of Representatives. President Prabowo Subianto then nominated Kuncoro for the same post in July 2025. He underwent a closed assessment by the House of Representative's first commission on 5 July and was approved in a session three days later. He was installed as ambassador on 8 October 2025. On 1 July 2026, he presented his credentials to president Abdel Fattah El-Sisi.

== Personal life ==
Kuncoro is married to Mantarina Herlianti and has three children.
