= Anita Lidya Luhulima =

Indonesian diplomat (1967–2025)

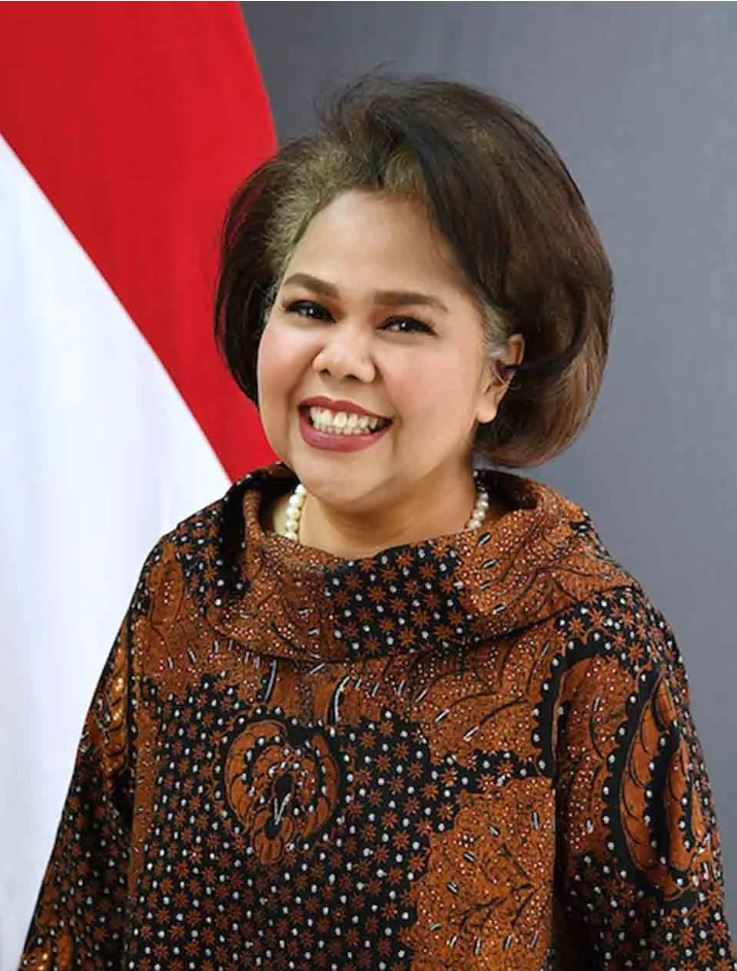

Ambassador of Indonesia to Poland
- In office 17 November 2021 – 15 February 2025
- President: Joko Widodo
- Preceded by: Siti Nugraha Mauludiah
- Succeeded by: Wahyu Permana (acting); Agus Heryana (acting)

Personal details
- Born: 1 June 1967
- Died: 15 February 2025 (aged 57) Jakarta, Indonesia
- Spouse: George Lantu (died 2021)
- Children: Attara Kanaya Lantu
- Parent: A. O. Luhulima (father)
- Education: Parahyangan Catholic University; Tufts University

Anita Lidya Luhulima (1 June 1967 – 15 February 2025) was an Indonesian career diplomat who served as the ambassador to Poland from 2021 until her death in 2025. Prior to her ambassadorial tenure, she served as deputy chief of mission at the embassy in London and secretary of the directorate general of multilateral cooperation.

She held various posts, including a tenure at the embassy in Washington with the rank of first secretary, the chief of ministerial and foreign representative administration bureau, and deputy chief of mission at the embassy in London. On 26 April 2017, Luhulima became the secretary of the directorate general of multilateral cooperation.

In June 2021, Luhulima was nominated by President Joko Widodo as ambassador for Poland. Upon passing an assessment by the House of Representative's first commission in July, she was installed as ambassador on 17 November. She arrived in Poland on 20 January 2022 and conducted her first meeting with Indonesian citizens on 30 January. She presented his credentials to the President of Poland Andrzej Duda on 22 February 2022. She was the third woman of Maluku descent to serve as an Indonesian ambassador.

During her ambassadorship, she intensively promoted Indonesian trade, investment, culture, and tourism. Under her leadership, the embassy participated in the Warsaw Food Expo for two consecutive years in May 2023 and May 2024. In September 2024, the embassy and the Indonesian Student Association in Poland (PPI) co-hosted the Indonesia Cultural Weekend to promote Indonesian culture and cuisine.

Luhulima died on the night of 15 February 2025 at the MRCC Siloam Hospital, Jakarta. Her body was laid at the Gatot Subroto funeral home the next day before being laid to rest at the Tanah Kusir Public Cemetery on 18 February. Following her death, the Polish embassy in Jakarta flew the Polish flag at half-mast as a sign of mourning.

== Personal life ==
Anita Luhulima was married to George Lantu, who was also a career diplomat. Lantu died in office on 17 May 2021 while serving as deputy chief of mission in Rome. The couple has one daughter, Attara Kanaya Lantu.
