= Padjadjaran University =

Public university in Bandung, Indonesia

Universitas Padjadjaran (Unpad)
- Universitas Padjadjaran
- Seal of Unpad
- Type: Public university
- Established: September 11, 1957; 69 years ago
- Affiliations: ASAIHL, AUAP
- Rector: Prof. H. Arief Sjamsulaksan Kartasasmita, dr., Sp.M., M.Kes., M.M., Ph.D.
- Academic staff: 2,073 (as of 2025)
- Administrative staff: 2,040 (as of 2021)
- Students: 32.481 (as of 2018)
- Location: Bandung and Jatinangor, West Java, Indonesia; 6.926139°S 107.774694°E
- Campus: Urban: Dipati Ukur Campus Suburb: Jatinangor Campus
- Student newspaper: KaMU (Kanal Media Unpad)
- Colors: Navy Blue
- Nickname: Unpad
- Website: www.unpad.ac.id

Universitas Padjadjaran (Indonesian: Universitas Padjadjaran; Sundanese: ᮅᮔᮤᮗᮨᮁᮞᮤᮒᮞ᮪ ᮕᮏᮏᮛᮔ᮪), abbreviated as Unpad) is a public university located in Bandung, West Java, Indonesia. It was established on 11 September 1957.

Unpad has gained the most applicant and highest passing grade in National Selection of State University Entrance (SNMPTN) since 2013. In 2014, Unpad was officially set as State University of Legal Entities and accredited "A" by BAN-PT. It also ranked as top ten universities in Indonesia by Ministry of Research, Technology and Higher Education in 2016. It is also one of the country's most prestigious and renowned higher educations. In the 2019 QS World Universities Ranking, Unpad is ranked 4th in Indonesia and got in the range of rankings of 651-700th in the world.

Unpad was also one of the contributors to the venue for an important conference, the Asia-Africa Conference in 1955, where Bandung was appointed as the host. Therefore, the construction of its facilities is prevalent since then.

== History ==
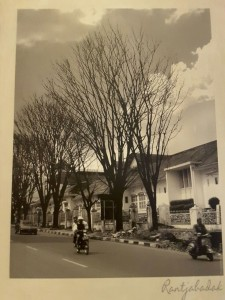
The building of Department of Medicine in Pasir Kaliki, Bandung circa 1957

The name "Padjadjaran" (in Republican Spelling System) was taken from the Sunda Kingdom capital of Pakuan Pajajaran. The background of establishment began from the willingness of community leaders to improve youth education to higher degree in West Java at the time. Since Bandung Institute of Technology had more focus on engineering science, people were keen to have other state university which provides education in various field of science. On 24 September 1957, the university was officially opened by President Sukarno. On 6 November 1957, Prof. Iwa Koesoemasoemantri was appointed the President of Padjadjaran University.

When established, the university had four departments: Law, Economics, Medicine, and Mathematics and Natural Sciences. Now it has developed into 16 faculties and several postgraduate programs, 44 undergraduate programs (Strata 1/S1), two specialist programs, nine doctorate programs (Strata 3/S3), 19 master's degree programs (Strata 2/S2), five profession programs, one four-year diploma program (D4), and 32 three-year diploma programs (D3).

Initially established in Bandung, all undergraduate departments have been relocated to Jatinangor, a town near Sumedang. The concept was inspired by Tsukuba Science City. The university started to move gradually, starting from the Faculty of Agriculture in 1983 and followed by the others. The rectorate building in Jatinangor was officially inaugurated on 5 January 2012.

== Rector ==
The list of Unpad Rector since its beginning until now as follows:

Arief S Kartasasmita

- Prof. Iwa Koesoemasoemantri (1957–1961)
- Prof. Soeria Soemantri (1961–1964)
- Moh Sanusi Hardjadinata (1964–1966)
- Prof. RS Soeria Atmadja (1966–1973)
- Prof. Dr. Mochtar Kusumaatmadja (1973–1974)
- Prof. Hindersah Wiraatmadja (1974–1982)
- Prof. Dr. Yuyun Wirasasmita (1982–1990)
- Prof. Dr. H. Maman P. Rukmana (1990–1998)
- Prof. Dr. HA Himendra Wargahadibrata (1998–2007)
- Prof. Dr. Ir. Ganjar Kurnia, DEA (2007–2015)
- Prof. Dr. med. Tri Hanggono Achmad, dr. (2015–2019)
- Prof. Dr. Rina Indiastuti, S.E., M.SIE., (2019–2024)
- Prof. Dr. Arief Sjamsulaksan Kartasasmita, M.M., M.Kes., Sp.M(K), Ph.D. (2024–present)

== Campuses ==
Unpad has two main campuses. One of the main campus located in Jatinangor, the other is Dipati Ukur campus, located in Bandung. Besides those two locations, there are several campuses spread over in Bandung including Sekeloa, Singaperbangsa, Dago 4, Simpang Dago, Dago Atas, Dago Pojok, Banda, Cimadiri, Cisangkuy, Eyckman, Pasirkaliki, Teuku Umar, and some other locations.

In September 2011, the university announced its intention to build a shopping center and a three storey hotel in Jl. Dago with the profits used to finance the university.

=== Dipati Ukur Campus ===
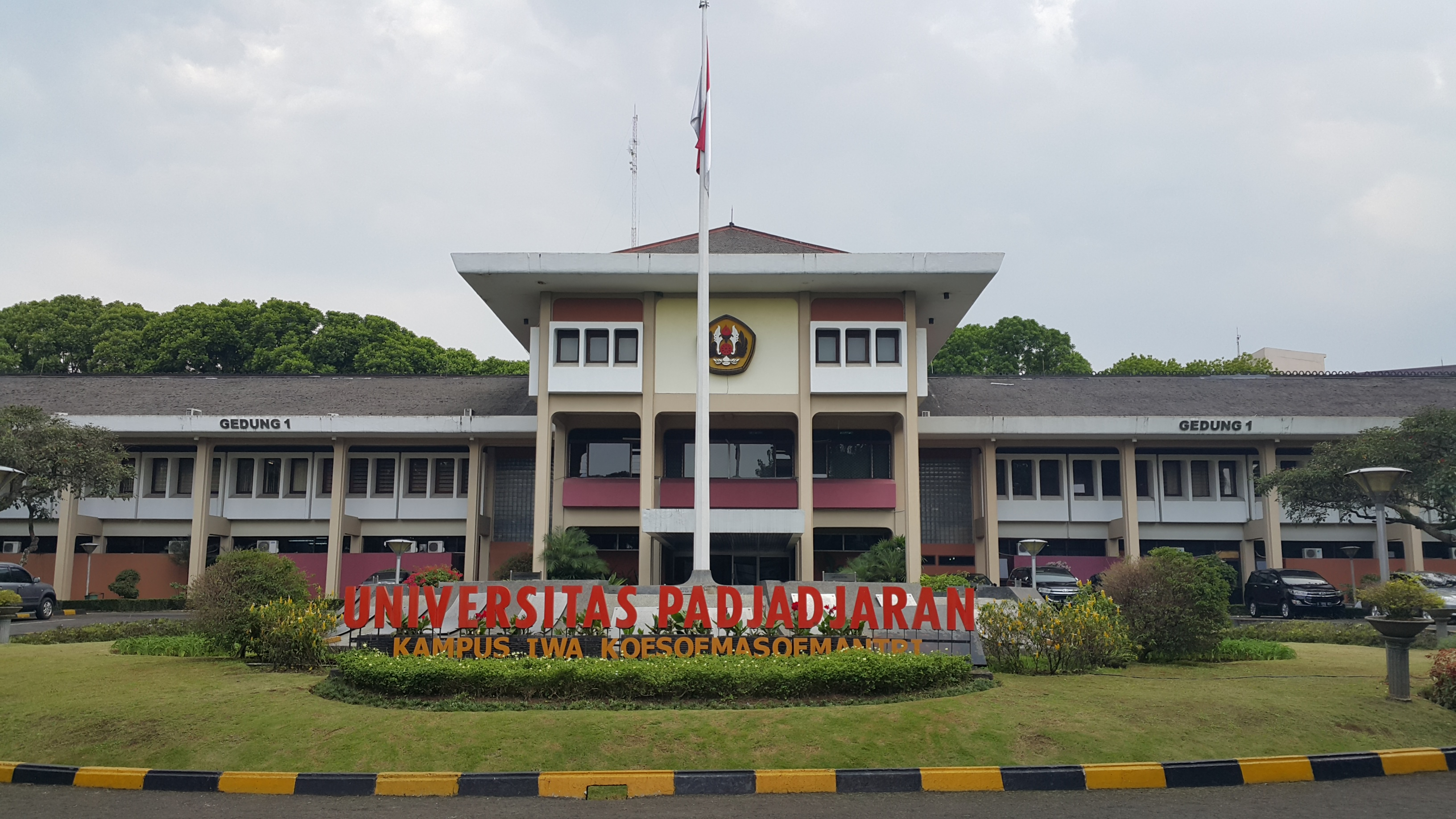
Dipati Ukur campus, Bandung

Unpad Dipati Ukur campus located in Jl. Dipati Ukur No.35, Bandung, that currently dedicated mostly for postgraduate programs. This campus was previously used for campus activities by Faculty of Economics and Business (Bachelor and Diploma) and Faculty of Law. However, starting from mid-2017, the two faculties followed the other faculties to move to the Jatinangor Sumedang campus.

Now this campus is used for campus activities of the Faculty of Economics and Business (Master and Doctoral) and it is used for other activities such as graduation, inauguration of professors and professional oaths.

=== Jatinangor Campus ===
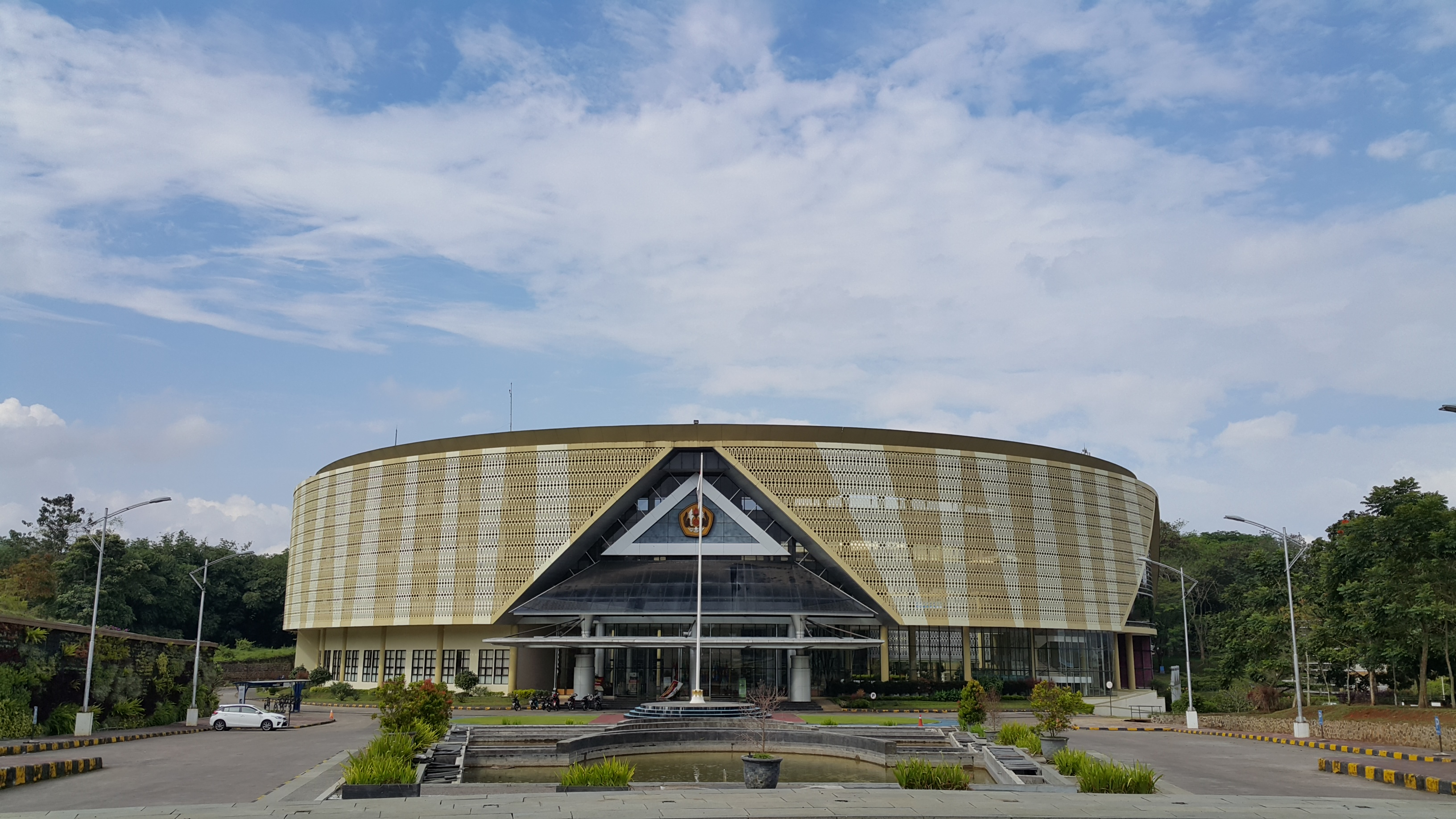
Rectorate of Padjadjaran University located in Jatinangor campus

Unpad Jatinangor campus located in Jatinangor, Sumedang Regency, West Java. This campus is the main campus which consists of Faculty of Medicine, Faculty of Dentistry, Faculty of Psychology, Faculty of Nursing, Faculty of Mathematics and Natural Sciences, Faculty of Animal Husbandry, Faculty of Agriculture Industrial Technology, Faculty of Agriculture, Faculty of Fishery and Marine Science, Faculty of Pharmacy, Faculty of Geological Engineering, Faculty of Communication Science, Faculty of Cultural Science, Faculty of Social and Political Sciences, Faculty of Law, and Faculty of Economics and Business.

Currently at the Jatinangor Campus, the Central Library / CISRAL building, the Central Laboratory, and 15 other new buildings have been completed at the end of 2016.

== Rankings ==
University rankings

Global – Overall
- QS World: =496 (2027)

Regional – Overall
- QS Asia: 96 (2026)

The QS Asia University Rangkings 2026 has ranks Universitas Padjadjaran as number 96. Meanwhile, in the QS World University Rankings 2027, the Padjadjaran University has ranks 496 globally and ranked 6th in Indonesia.

=== Subject ===
QS World University Rankings by Subject 2026

World rank	Subject
201 – 250	▲ Law
251 – 300	▲ Agriculture & Forestry
301 – 350	
351 – 400	Pharmacy & Pharmacology
401 – 450	Economics & Econometrics
451 – 500	
501 – 550	▲ Business & Management Studies; ▼ Medicine
551 – 600	

QS by Clusters (2026)
Subject	Global	National
Arts & Humanities	501-550	6
Engineering and Technology	-	-
Life Sciences & Medicine	451-500	4
Natural Sciences	-	-
Social Sciences & Management	451-500	7

THE World University Rankings by Subject 2026
Subject	Global	National
Arts & humanities	-	-
Business & economics	▲801-1000	▲10
Computer science	801-1000	▲7
Education	-	-
Engineering	1001-1250	8
Law	▲301-350	▼9
Life sciences	1001+	▼11
Medical & Health	▲801-1000	▲6
Physical sciences	▲1001-1250	▲8
Psychology	-	-
Social sciences	801-1000	▼13

== Facilities ==
=== Accommodation ===
There are several dormitories:

- Asrama Padjadjaran I - allocated for students funded by Bidik Misi scholarship
- Asrama Padjadjaran II - allocated for students funded by Bidik Misi scholarship
- Asrama Padjadjaran III - allocated for pharmacy students
- Asrama Pedca
- Bale Padjadjaran - allocated for first-year medicine students
- Bale Santika - Auditorium

All of student dormitories are located in Jatinangor, Sumedang.

=== Transportation ===
The university has some free campus bus Odong operated from Monday until Friday, from 7 a.m. to 4 p.m. in Jatinangor campus.

=== Library ===
As one of the most important facility, Unpad has a central library located in front of Dipati Ukur campus, named UPT Perpustakaan Universitas Padjadjaran. Later on, it moved to Jatinangor campus. Moreover, each of faculties in the university has at least one library in their buildings.

=== Health Center ===
Unpad has two health center located in Dipati Ukur, named Bale Kesehatan, and in Jatinangor, named Klinik Padjadjaran. Not only for students, Klinik Padjadjaran also provides health service for the public.

=== Sports ===
There are two sport facilities: Stadion Jati Padjadjaran (outdoor) and Bale Santika (indoor). Both are located in Jatinangor campus.

=== Other facilities ===
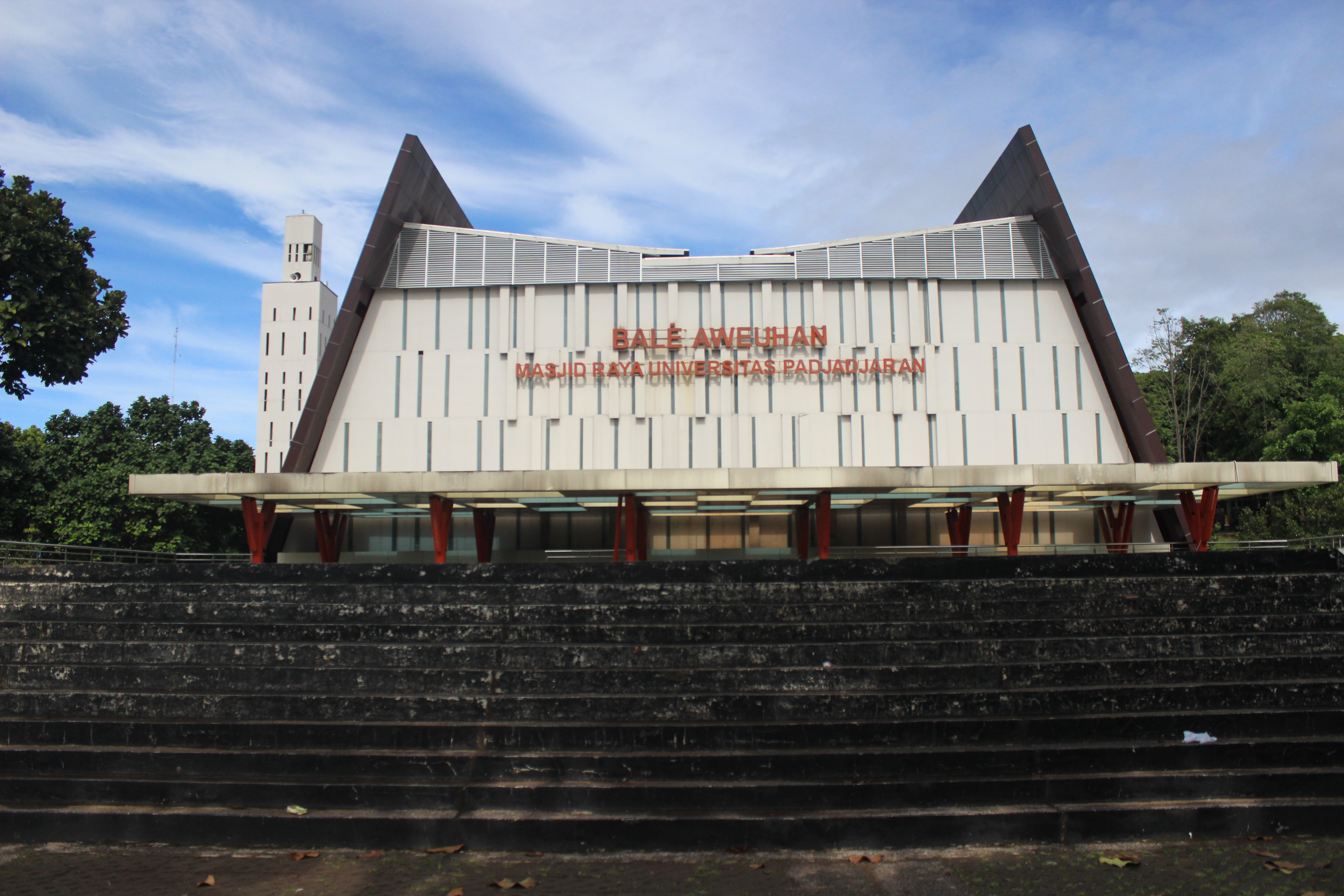
Grand Mosque of Unpad (Masjid Raya Unpad/MRU)

Several students from non-social science faculty shall visit Center for Basic Science Program, known as PTBS or PPBS, in their first year. Within this period, they will learn basic science: biology, chemistry, physics and calculus. There is also Center for Language Program developed by Faculty of Literature.

In 2013, Unpad built a mosque in Jatinangor campus named Masjid Raya Unpad (MRU), also known as Bale Aweuhan. There is also a mosque in Dipati Ukur campus.

The university also built a central laboratory in 2016 to advance multi discipline research, especially in Herbal Science. The building is located in Jatinangor campus.

== Faculties ==
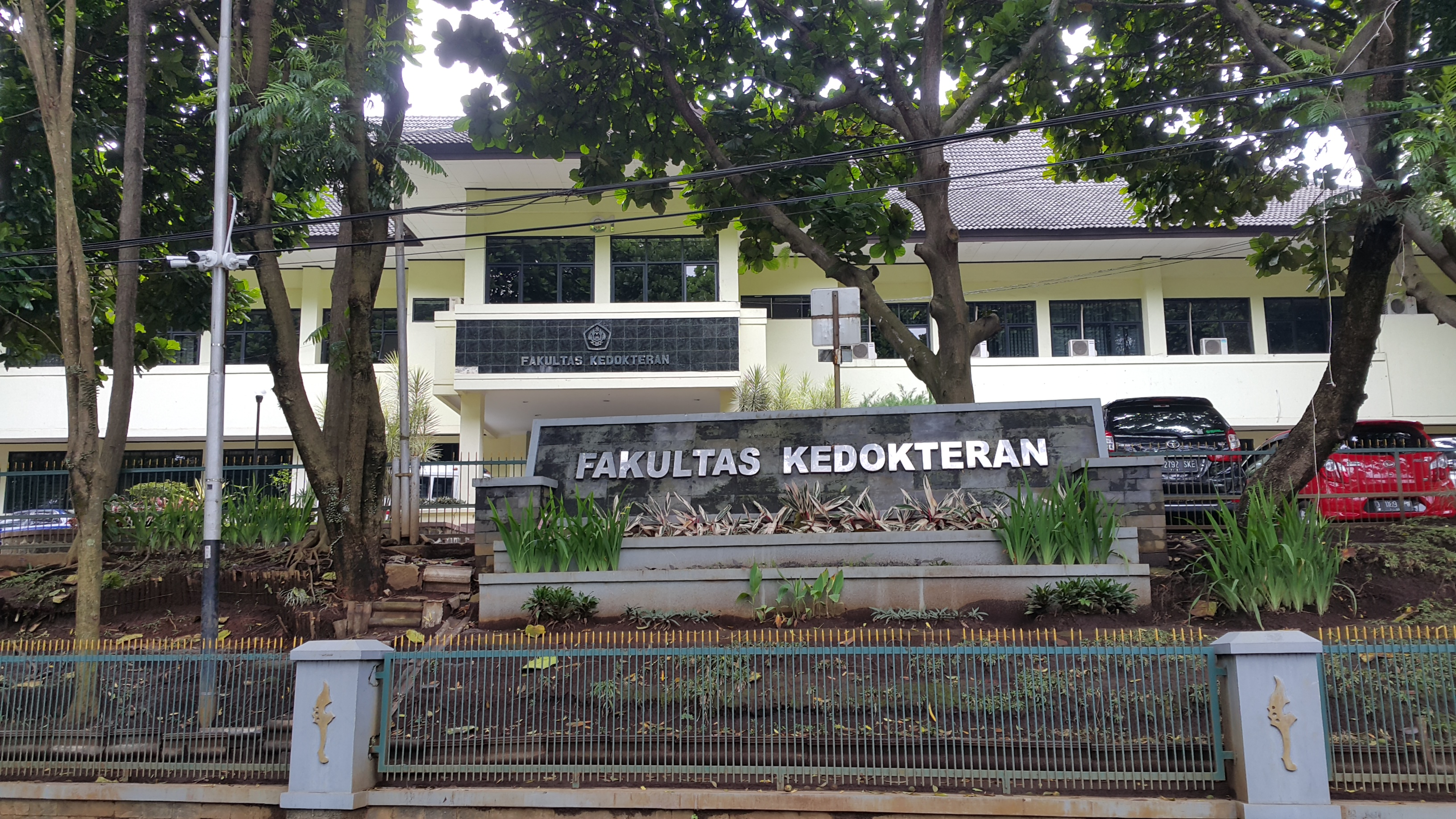
Faculty of Medicine

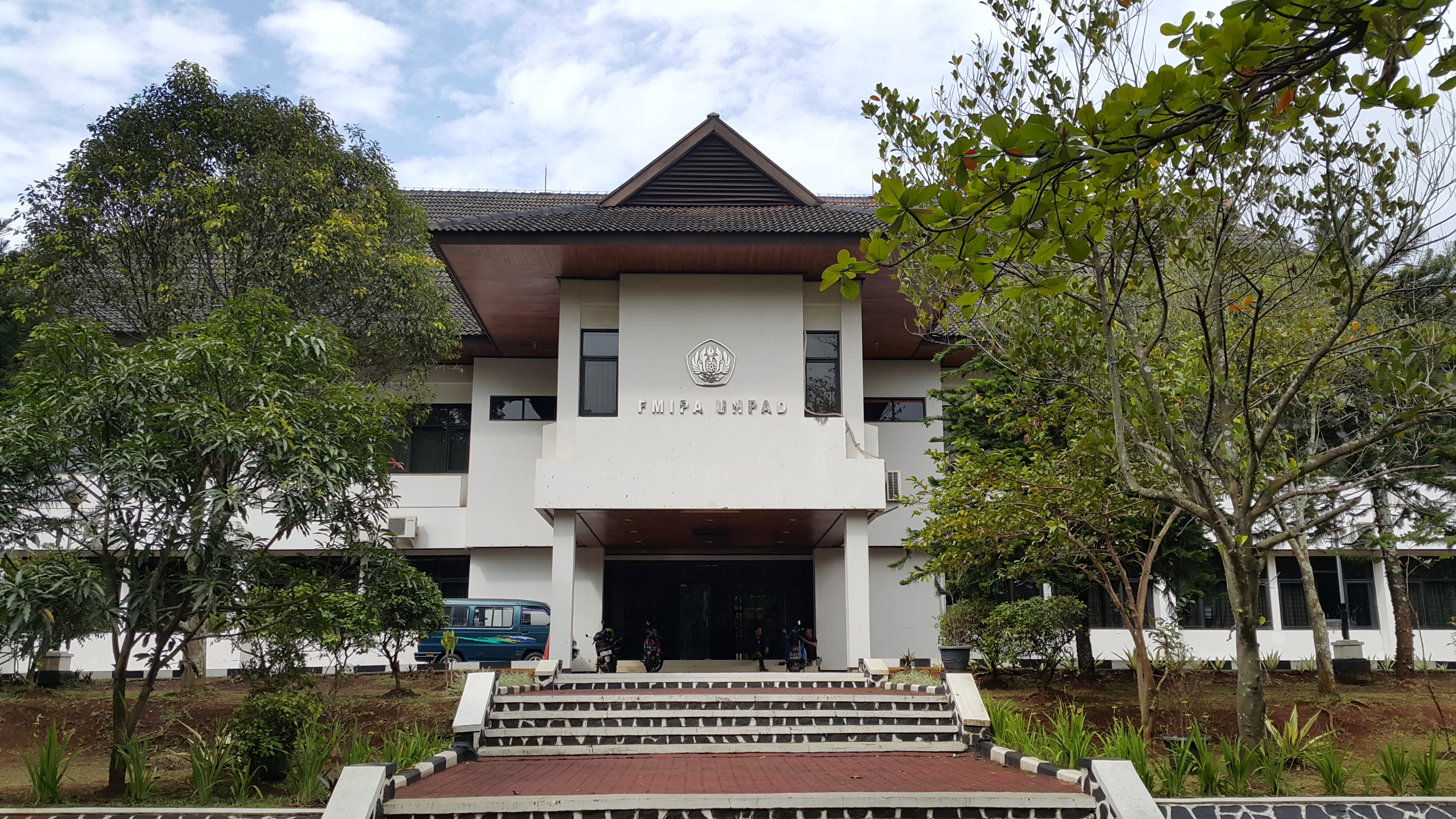
Faculty of Mathematics and Natural Sciences

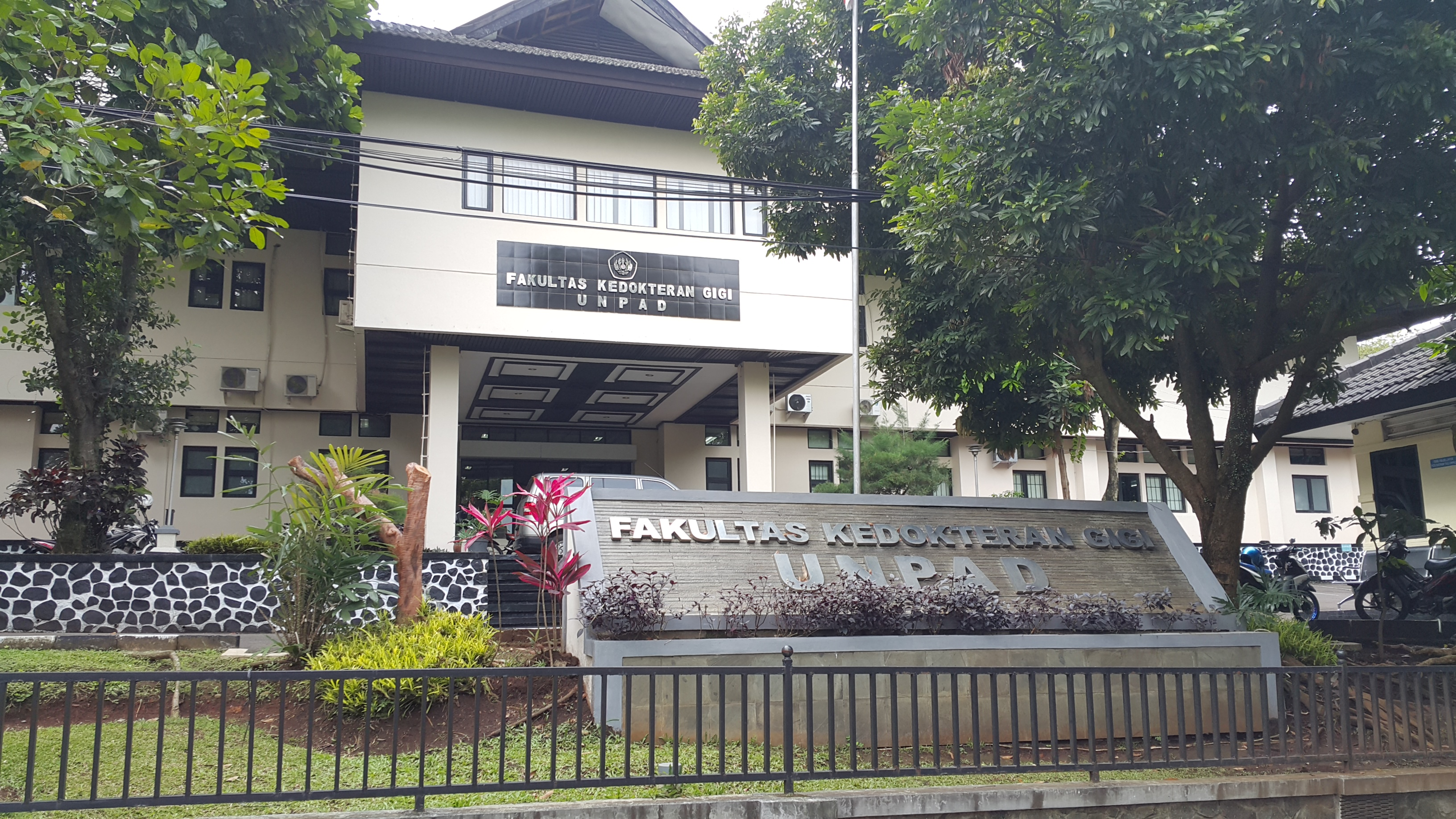
Faculty of Dentistry

Faculty Building

Faculty of Law
- Law Studies

Faculty of Economics

- Accounting
- Management
- Development Economics
- Islamic Economics
- Digital Business

Faculty of Medicine

- Medical Studies
- Veterinary

Faculty of Mathematics and Natural Sciences

- Mathematics
- Chemistry
- Physics
- Biology
- Statistics
- Geophysics
- Information Technology
- Electrical Engineering
- Actuarial Science

Faculty of Agriculture

- Agrotechnology
- Agribusiness

Faculty of Dentistry
- Dentistry

Faculty of Social and Political Sciences

- Public Administration
- International Relations
- Social Welfare
- Government Science
- Anthropology
- Business Administration
- Sociology
- Political Science

Faculty of Cultural Sciences

- Indonesian Literature
- Sundanese Literature
- History
- Japanese Language and Culture
- English Literature
- French Literature
- German Literature
- Arabic literature
- Russian Literature

Faculty of Psychology

- Psychology

Faculty of Animal Husbandry

- Animal Husbandry

Faculty of Communication Sciences
- Communication Science
- Library Science
- Public Relations
- Television and Film
- Communication Management
- Journalism

Faculty of Fisheries and Marine Science

- Fishery
- Marine Science

Faculty of Agriculture Industrial Technology

- Agricultural Engineering
- Food Technology
- Agricultural Industrial Technology

Faculty of Nursing

- Nursing

Faculty of Pharmacy

- Pharmacy
- Cosmetics Engineering

Faculty of Geological Engineering

- Geological Engineering

Vocational School

- Business Logistics
- Chemical Industry Technology
- Chinese Language and Culture
- Digital Archiving
- Digital Marketing
- Government Administration
- International Business
- Marine Tourism
- Media Production Management
- Midwifery
- Public Finance Administration
- Public Sector Accounting
- Tax Accounting
