= Indonesia Open University =

Indonesian state university

- Universitas Terbuka
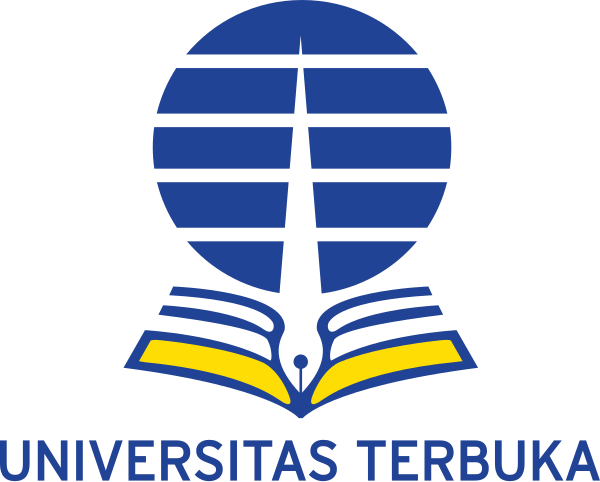
- Motto: Making Higher Education Open to All
- Type: Public university
- Established: 4 September 1984; 42 years ago
- Rector: Ali Muktiyanto
- Students: 1,045,665 (total) as per 2019/2020 341,956 (active) as per 16 November 2021
- Location: Jalan Cabe Raya, Pondok Cabe, Pamulang 15418, South Tangerang, Banten, Indonesia; 6.344890°S 106.758087°E
- Website: www.ut.ac.id

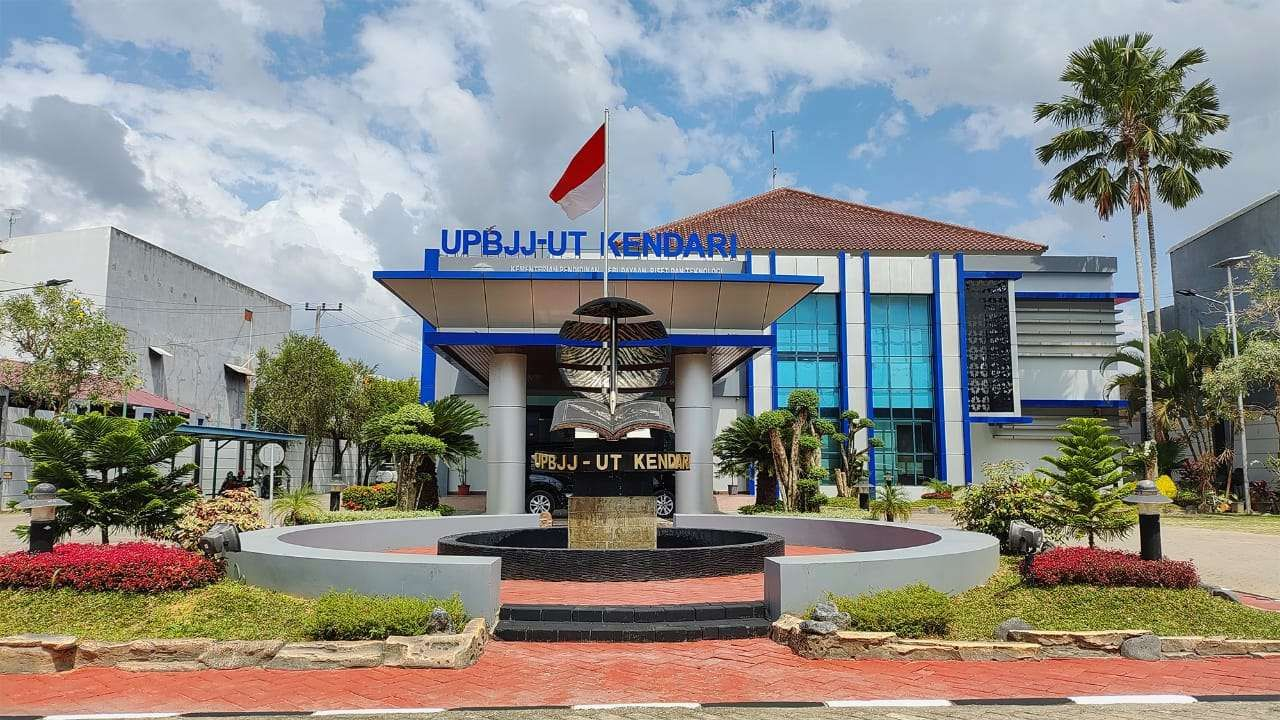
Indonesian Open university campus building in Kendari

Indonesia Open University (UT; Indonesian: Universitas Terbuka) is a public university in South Tangerang, Banten, Indonesia. The university employs an Open and Distance Learning (ODL) system to widen access to higher education to all Indonesian citizens, including those who live in remote islands throughout the country, and in various parts of the world. It has a total student body of 1,045,665 (as of 2019/2020 according to Indonesia's Ministry of Education and Culture Higher Education database). According to a distance education institution in the UK, which published "The Top Ten Mega Universities", UT-3 ranks closely with universities from China and Turkey.

== History ==
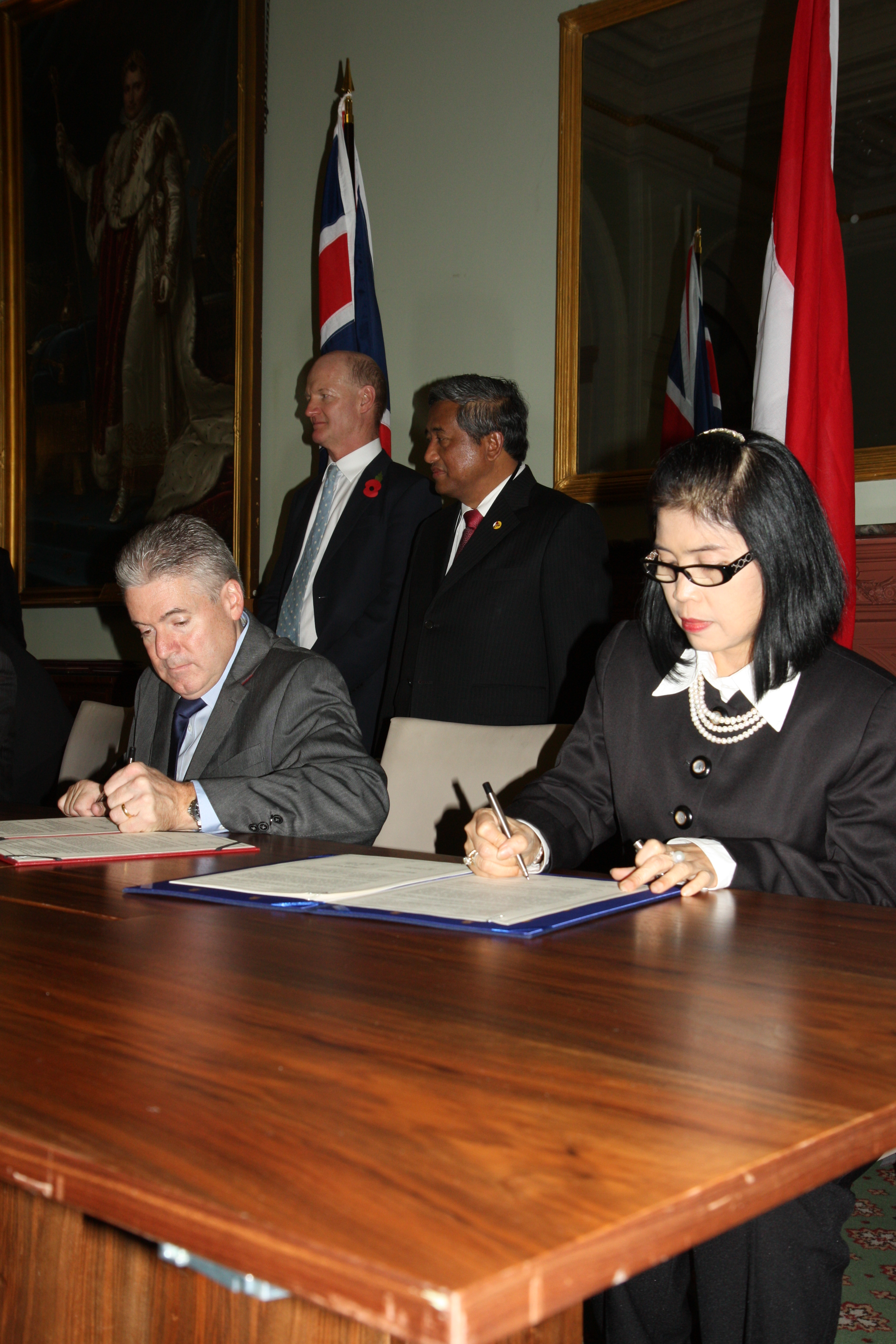
The Open University and Universitas Terbuka on collaboration in quality assurance, curriculum development and pedagogic research.

In its first year of existence, the Open University opened four undergraduate study programs (S1), which included Public Administration, Business Administration, Economics and Development Studies, and Statistics. Another type of study program, namely the education program, is a takeover of the Teacher Education Project tasks through Distance Learning with a new curriculum and teaching materials; Likewise with the Act V program which was taken over from an existing project.

== Accreditation ==
UT has been awarded the 'International Accreditation' and 'Certificate of Quality' by the International Council for Open and Distance Education (ICDE) Standard Agency (ISA), and ISO 9001:2000 by the Certification bodies, i.e. SAI Global and SGS. UT's study programs have also been accredited by The National Accreditation Board of Higher Education (BAN-PT).

== Operational networking ==
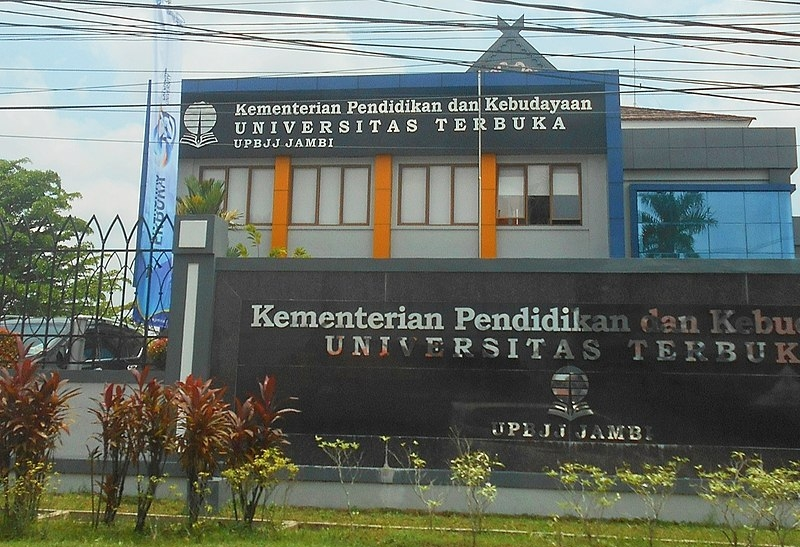
UPBJ building, open university campus in Banjarmasin

UT has 41 regional offices: 40 UPBJJ-UT and 1 PPM-LN. The UPBJJ-UT themselves are located in the capitals of each Indonesia 34 provinces in addition to 5 major cities of Bogor, Purwokerto, Surakarta, Jember, and Malang, in addition to the recently (re-)established UPBJJ in Dili, Timor Leste, in 2019, and the UT PPM-LN or foreign office. To support their operations, each UPBJJ-UT establishes close collaboration with various institutions, particularly with:

- The local public and private universities for getting tutors, practicum instructors, and examination supervisors;
- Local governments for conducting tutorials and examination, as well as for getting scholarships for students; and
- Local radio and TV stations for relaying the tutorials and information about academic activities. The regular tutorials broadcast by the national radio stations (RRI).

At the national level, UT also has long standing collaborations with:

- Q-Channel and TV-Edukasi for broadcasting UT's TV programs;
- RRI for broadcasting radio tutorials;
- BRI and BTN for receiving tuition fees and learning materials purchase from students; and
- PT Pos Indonesia for delivering the learning materials, examination documents and other supporting materials.

== Partnerships ==
UT has established partnerships with other institutions, including the Ministry of National Education, Ministry of Home Affairs, Navy, Ministry of Defense and Security, Ministry of Agriculture, Bank Negara Indonesia (BNI), Bank Rakyat Indonesia (BRI), Garuda Indonesia, Merpati Nusantara, PT Pos Indonesia, Central Bureau for Statistics, PT Indosat, PT Tugu Pratama, National Coordinating Agency for Family Planning (BKKBN), and Al-Zaitun Islamic Boarding School, Bank Tabungan Negara (BTN), National Archives of Indonesia (ANRI), National Civil Service Agency (BKN), School of Business and Management (STEKPI), PT Jakarta Software Komunikasi and all provincial agencies, regencies and towns in Indonesia.

UT also has close relationships with various international organizations such as the South-East Asian Ministers of Education Organization (SEAMEO), United Nations Educational, Scientific and Cultural Organization (UNESCO), and SEAMEO Regional Open Learning Center (SEAMOLEC).

UT is one of the founding members of the Asian Association of Open Universities (AAOU), and the Global Mega-University Network (GMUNET). In addition UT is also an active member of the International Council for Open and Distance Education (ICDE).

== Academic programmes ==
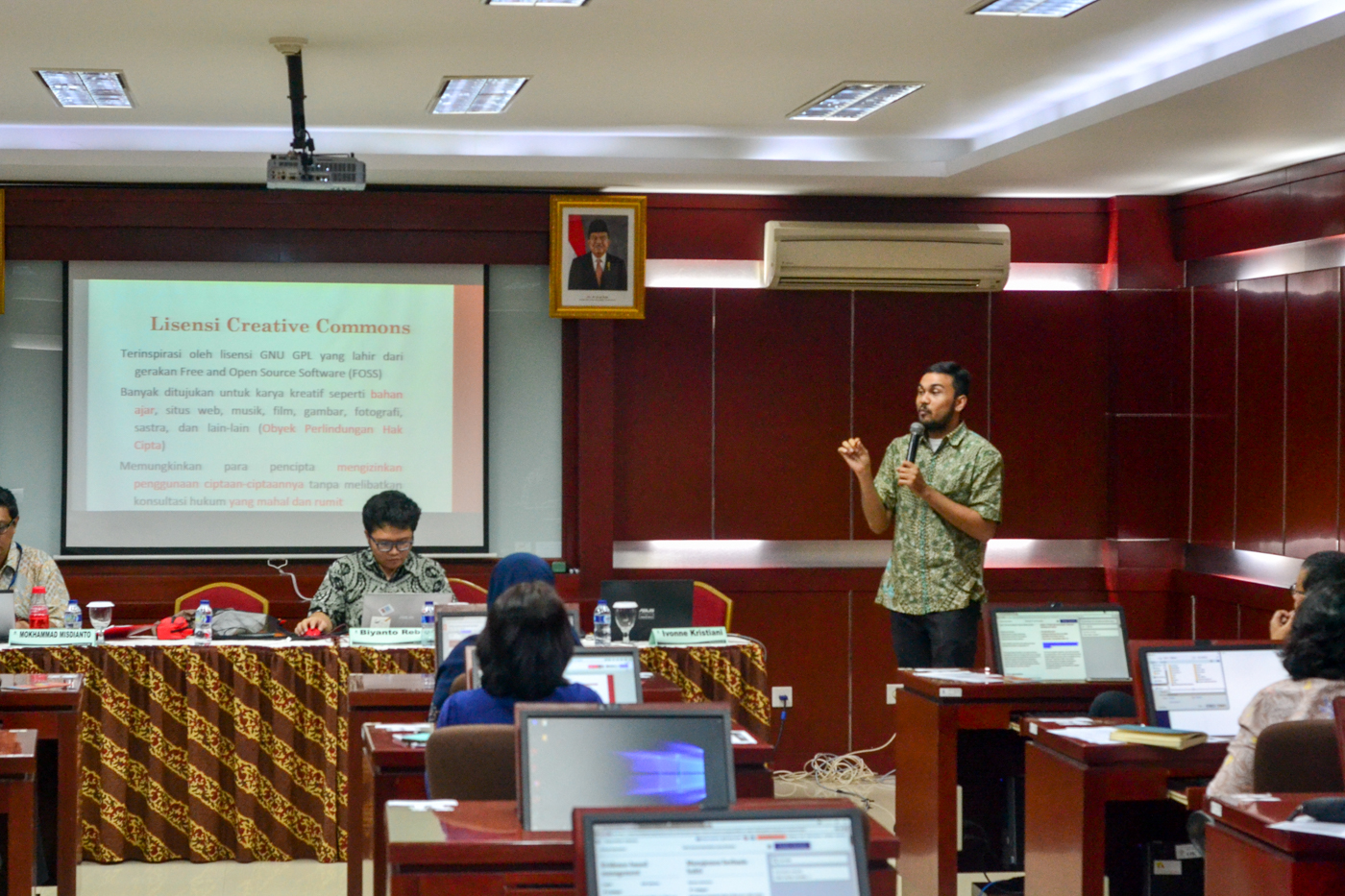
Wikipedia training session in Indonesia Open University

UT has four faculties and one graduate program that offer more than 40 active study programmes, including doctoral programmes (S3), master programmes (S2), bachelor programmes (Sarjana/S1), diploma programmes (D3 and D4), and certificate programmes.

=== Faculty of Teacher Training and Educational Sciences ===
Bachelor (S1) programmes

- Indonesian and Literature Education
- English Education
- Mathematics Education
- Physics Education
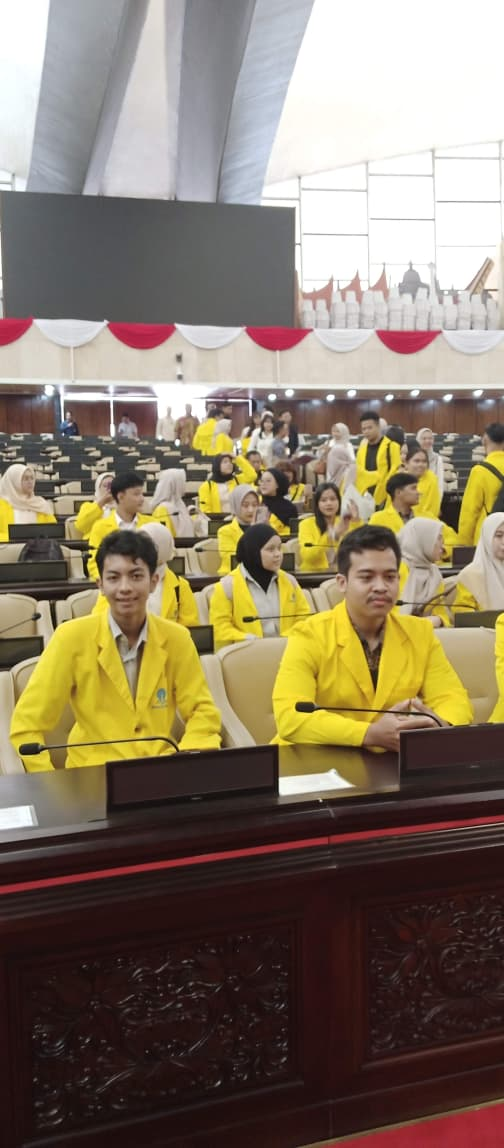
  UT students of the Faculty of Economics and Political Sciences study programs in the DPR-RI, Jakarta, Indonesia 2025
- Chemistry Education
- Biology Education
- Economics Education
- Pancasila and Civics Education
- Islamic Religious Education
- Primary School Teacher Education
- Early Childhood Education Teacher
- Educational Technology

Certificate programmes

- Indonesian for Foreigners
- Public Administration of District Area

=== Faculty of Law, Social, and Political Sciences ===
Bachelor (S1) programmes

- Public Administration
- Business Administration
- Government Studies
- Communication Science
- Sociology
- Law
- Taxation
- Library Science or Archive
- English Language and Literature Specialized in Translation Studies

Diploma 4(D4) program

- Public Administration

Diploma 3(D3) program

- Taxation

=== Faculty of Economics ===
Bachelor (S1) programmes

- Economics Development
- Sharia Economy
- Management
- Accounting
- Public Financial Accounting
- Tourism

=== Faculty of Science and Technology ===
Bachelor (S1) programmes

- Mathematics
- Statistics
- Biology
- Agribusiness, majoring in agricultural extension and communication/animal husbandry/fishery
- Food Technology and Science
- Urban and Regional Planning
- Information Systems
- Data Science

=== Graduate programmes ===
Master (S2) programmes

- Administration Science, majoring in public administration
- Management
- Marine Science, majoring in fishery management
- Mathematics Education
- English Education
- Primary Education
- Environment science

Doctoral (S3) programmes

- Management
- Public Administration

== Research and development ==
The Center for Research and Community Services of UT (LPPM-UT) has four centers:

- Center of Institutional Research and System Development
- Center of Science
- Center of Community Services
- Inter-University Center for Improving and Developing Instructional Activities (IUC-IDIA)

Research The LPPM-UT specializes research and development in the following areas:

- Open and Distance Education
- Evaluation of Educational
- Educational Management
- Policy and Institutional Studies
- Social Development
- Regional Economic Development
- Environmental Impact Analysis
- Regional Development
- Agriculture, Fishery, and Husbandry
- Sciences
- Instructional Media
- Consultancy and Research Training
- Monitoring and Evaluation

Development of management information systems LPPM-UT provides:

- Management Information System Design
- Application of Computerized Management Information
- Systems Application
- website Design and Development
- Information Systems Development
- Information Systems Evaluation
- Media Prototype Development

Community services Community services include:

- Training for continuing education programs.
- Development of people's empowerment programs to improve the quality of life.
- Development of networks and partnerships to support the continuing education and social services programs.
- Professional consultancy services in people's empowerment, human resource, education, and development of both organization and society.

Development and Improvement of Instructions The Inter-University Center for Improving and Developing of Instructional Activities (IUC-IDIA) has a mission to improve the quality of instruction at higher levels of education at open and distance higher education and conventional universities. The IUC-IDIA professional staff have experience in conducting needs analysis, developing programs, curriculum development, assessment of learning, evaluating instructional programs, developing the prototype of learning materials, developing multi-media course materials, developing computer-based tutorials, and professional training for educators, trainers, and instructor.

The IUC-IDIA has strategic alliances with other units within UT itself, with over 51 state-owned universities, and with education and training centers in 25 Departments, Colleges belonged to certain governmental departments, as well as education and training centers for specific fields (e.g. Banking, department stores, supermarkets, etc.)

== Notable alumni ==
- Anang Hermansyah (Musician & Politician)
- Andika Perkasa (Former Commander of the Indonesian National Armed Forces & Politician)
- Hadi Tjahjanto (Former Commander of the Indonesian National Armed Forces & Politician)
- Angga Yunanda (Actor)
- Bambang Santoso (Politician)
- Bambang Soesatyo (Politician)
- Bayu Oktara (Actor, Presenter, and Politician)
- Dina Lorenza (Actress and Politician)
- Dwi Putri Bonita (Singer)
- Giring Ganesha (Musician and Politician)
- Happy Asmara (Writer & Singer)
- Kamasean Matthews (Singer)
- Kristiani Herrawati (Former First Lady of Indonesia and wife of Susilo Bambang Yudhoyono)
- Kunto Ari Wibowo (Commander of Joint Regional Defense Command I)
- Moeldoko (Former Commander of the Indonesian National Armed Forces & Politician)
- Novi Herlina (Singer)
- Rey Mbayang (Actor)
- Sophia Latjuba (Actress)
- Sugianto Sabran (Politician)
- Yosua Hutabarat (Former Mobile Brigade Corps of Indonesian National Police)
- Tamara Geraldine (Actress)
- Tina Toon (Musician and Politician)
- Wiranto (Former Commander of the Indonesian National Armed Forces & Politician)
- A.M. Hendropriyono (First Head of the State Intelligence Agency)
- Agustiar Sabran (Governor of Central Kalimantan & Politician)
- Cheppy Wartono (Diplomat & Politician)
- Djohar Arifin Husin (Former Chairman of the Football Association of Indonesia)
- Hassanudin (Major General & Former Acting Governor of North Sumatra)
- Julmansyah (Forester & Bureaucrat)
- Mohammad Rudy Salahuddin (Former Acting Governor of Gorontalo)
- Mooryati Soedibyo (Founder of Mustika Ratu & Puteri Indonesia, Politician)
- Rukmini (First female flag officer of the Indonesian Air Force)
- Sientje Sondakh Mandey (Politician)
- Syahrul (Former Mayor of Tanjungpinang)
- Syarfi Hutauruk (Politician & Former Mayor of Sibolga)
