= 2024 Central Kalimantan gubernatorial election =

- 27 November 2024
- Turnout: 69.61%
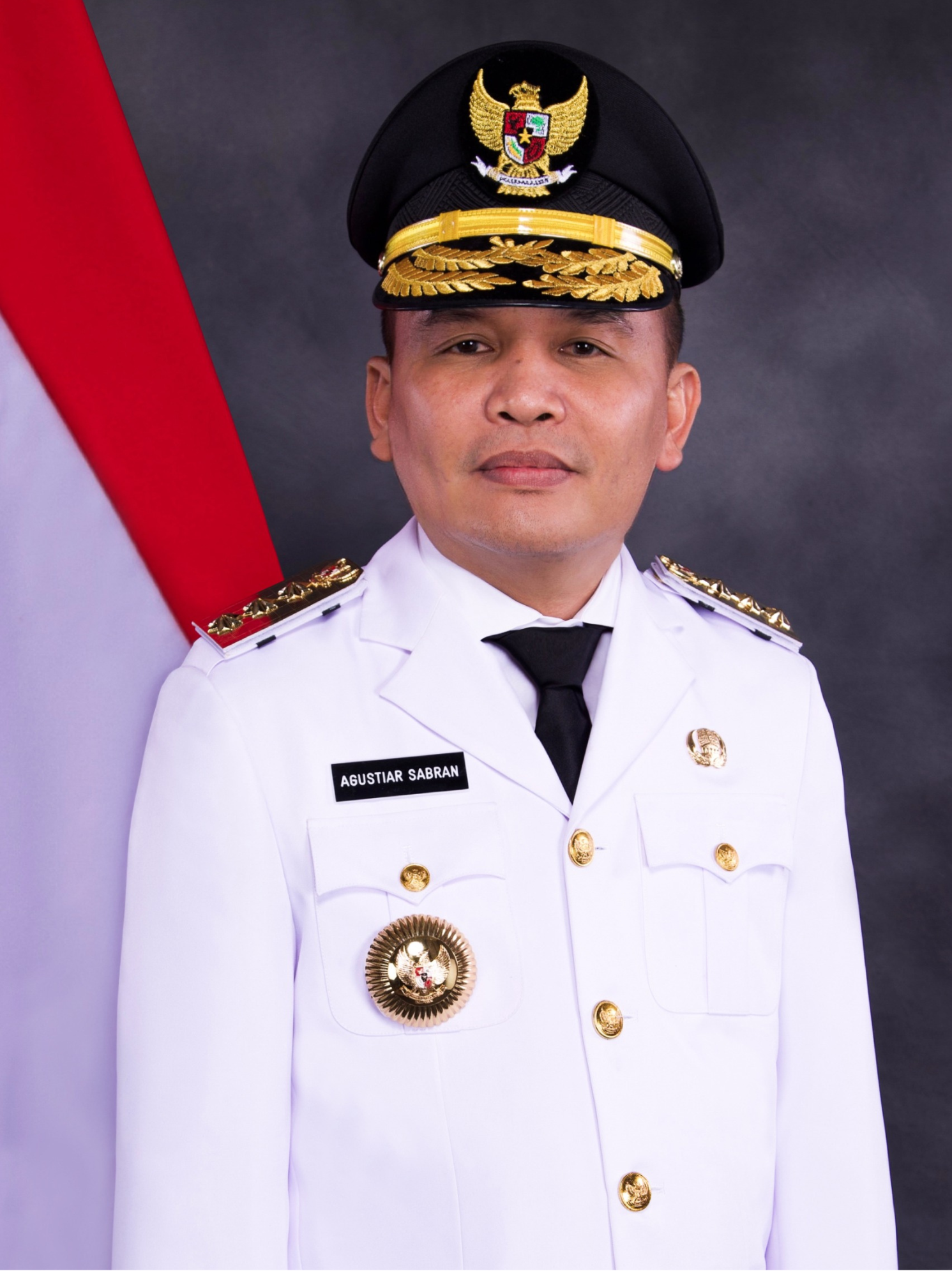

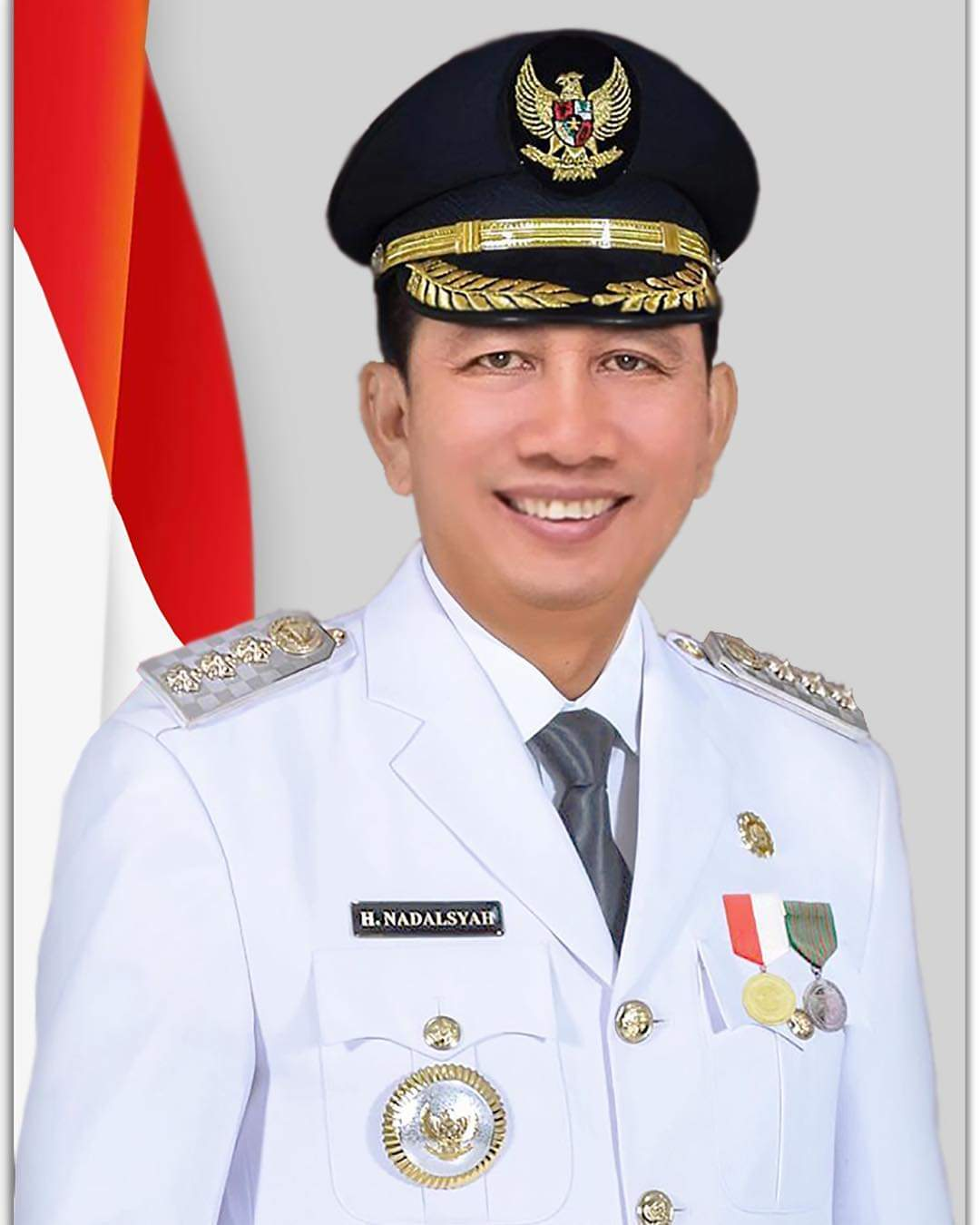

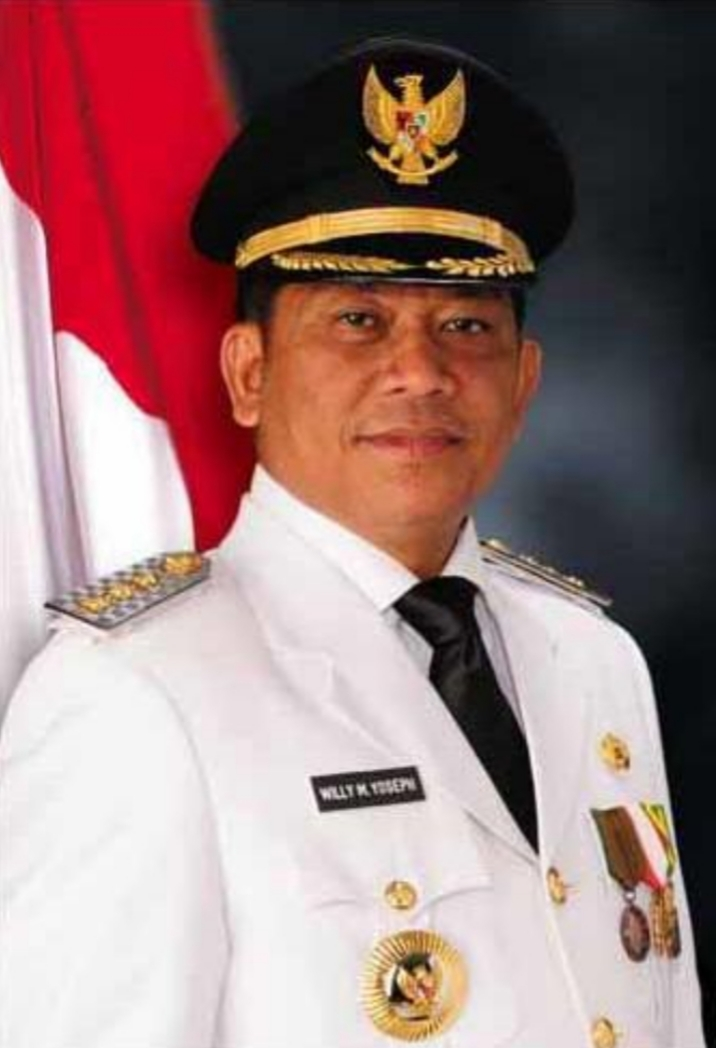

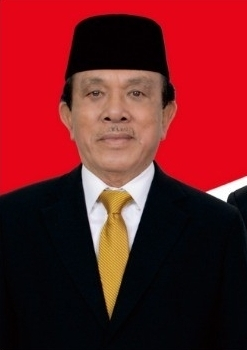
Nominee	Agustiar Sabran	Nadalsyah
Party	Gerindra	Demokrat
Alliance	KIM Plus	–
Running mate	Edy Pratowo	Supian Hadi
Popular vote	484,754	468,925
Percentage	37.27%	36.06%
Nominee	Willy Midel Yoseph	Abdul Razak
Party	NasDem	Golkar
Running mate	Ismail bin Yahya	Sri Suwanto
Popular vote	279,426	67,385
Percentage	21.49%	5.18%
- Results map by district
Governor before election
Sugianto Sabran
PDI-P
Elected Governor
Agustiar Sabran
Gerindra

The 2024 Central Kalimantan gubernatorial election was held on 27 November 2024 as part of nationwide local elections to elect the governor and vice governor of Central Kalimantan for a five-year term. The previous election was held in 2020. Agustiar Sabran of the Gerindra Party won the election with 37% of the vote. The Democratic Party's Nadalsyah, a former regent of North Barito, placed second with 36%.

== Electoral system ==
The election, like other local elections in 2024, follow the first-past-the-post system where the candidate with the most votes wins the election, even if they do not win a majority. It is possible for a candidate to run uncontested, in which case the candidate is still required to win a majority of votes "against" an "empty box" option. Should the candidate fail to do so, the election will be repeated on a later date.

== Candidates ==
According to electoral regulations, in order to qualify for the election, candidates were required to secure support from a political party or a coalition of parties controlling 9 seats (20 percent of all seats) in the Central Kalimantan Regional House of Representatives (DPRD). The Indonesian Democratic Party of Struggle, with 10 out of 45 seats from the 2024 legislative election, is the only party eligible to nominate a candidate without forming a coalition with other parties. However, following a Constitutional Court of Indonesia decision in August 2024, the political support required to nominate a candidate was lowered to between 6.5 and 10 percent of the popular vote. Candidates may alternatively demonstrate support to run as an independent in form of photocopies of identity cards, which in Central Kalimantan's case corresponds to 193,512 copies. No independent candidates registered with the General Elections Commission (KPU) prior to the set deadline.

The incumbent governor, Sugianto Sabran, had served two terms and was therefore ineligible to contest the election.

=== Declared ===
Candidate from Demokrat and PDIP
Nadalsyah	Sigit K. Yunianto
for Governor	for Vice Governor
Regent of North Barito (2018-2023)	Speaker of Regional House of Palangkaraya City (2019-now)
Parties
16 / 45 (36%) PDIP (10 seats); Demokrat (6 seats)

=== Potential ===
The following are individuals who have either been publicly mentioned as a potential candidate by a political party in the DPRD, publicly declared their candidacy with press coverage, or considered as a potential candidate by media outlets:

- Edy Pratowo (Golkar), incumbent vice governor.
- Abdul Razak (Golkar), former regent of West Kotawaringin, member of Central Kalimantan DPRD.
- Nuryakin, provincial secretary of Central Kalimantan.

== Political map ==
Following the 2024 Indonesian legislative election, nine political parties are represented in the Central Kalimantan DPRD:

Political parties	Seat count
Indonesian Democratic Party of Struggle (PDI-P)	10 / 45
Party of Functional Groups (Golkar)	8 / 45
Great Indonesia Movement Party (Gerindra)	6 / 45
Democratic Party (Demokrat)	6 / 45
NasDem Party	5 / 45
National Awakening Party (PKB)	4 / 45
National Mandate Party (PAN)	4 / 45
Prosperous Justice Party (PKS)	1 / 45
Perindo Party	1 / 45

== Results ==
Candidate	Running mate	Party	Votes	%
Agustiar Sabran	Edy Pratowo	Gerindra Party	484,754	37.27
Nadalsyah	Supian Hadi	Democratic Party	468,925	36.06
Willy Midel Yoseph	Ismail bin Yahya	NasDem Party	279,426	21.49
Abdul Razak	Sri Suwanto	Golkar	67,385	5.18
Total			1,300,490	100.00
Valid votes			1,300,490	95.31
Invalid votes			63,980	4.69
Total votes			1,364,470	100.00
Registered voters/turnout			1,960,053	69.61
Source: KPU Kalimantan Tengah

Candidate vote share by district
Willy–Habib

Nadalsyah–Supian

Agustiar–Edy

Razak–Sri Suwanto
