= Sientje Sondakh Mandey =

Indonesian politician

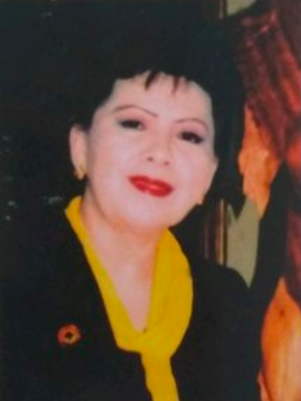
- Portrait, c. 2004

Member of the Regional Representative Council
- In office 25 October 2013 – 1 October 2014
- Preceded by: Ferry Tinggogoy
- Constituency: North Sulawesi
- In office 1 October 2004 – 1 October 2009
- Constituency: North Sulawesi
- Majority: 76,176 (6,17%)

Personal details
- Born: Sientje Sondakh Mandey; 28 November 1947 (age 78) Manado, North Sulawesi, East Indonesia
- Party: Non-partisan
- Spouse: Adolf Jouke Sondakh
- Children: 2
- Education: Sam Ratulangi University (Unsrat); Indonesia Open University (UT)
- Occupation: Politician

Sientje Sondakh Mandey (born 28 November 1947), more colloquially referred to as Sientje, is a Christian Indonesian Politician from the province of North Sulawesi. She served in the Regional Representative Council of the Republic of Indonesia from 2004 until 2009, and again from 2013 until 2014, following the death of Ferry Tinggogoy. She was the wife of the now deceased former governor of North Sulawesi, Adolf Jouke Sondakh. Born in Manado, North Sulawesi, she enrolled at Sam Ratulangi University. However, she didn't finish her degree, instead, she discontinued her education until 1985, when she attended Indonesia Open University, and graduated in 1990.

After graduating, she became a teacher at the Purple Campus College of Economics. In 2004, she was elected into the newly formed Regional Representative Council, the newly formed second branch of the national legislature. As a senator, she fought in favor of education and health regulations, which benefited women and children. She left the office of senator in 2009, after not seeking re-election. In 2013, when then senator Ferry Tinggogoy died 4 years into his term, Sientje was chosen to replace him for the rest of Tinggogoy's term. She left office in 2014.

== Early life and youth ==
Sientje Sondakh Mandey was born on 28 November 1947, in Manado, North Sulawesi, in what was then the State of East Indonesia, a federal state of the United States of Indonesia (RIS), during the Indonesian National Revolution. She moved from Manado to Sukabumi, West Java, and began her early education at the Kehidupan Baru Elementary school in 1958. She moved back to Manado in 1961, and continued her Secondary education at Manado Christian Junior High School. In 1968, she enrolled at Sam Ratulangi University, named after Indonesian national hero Sam Ratulangi. However, she didn't finish her degree. Instead, she discontinued her education until 1985, when she attended Indonesia Open University. She graduated from there in 1990, and began teaching at the Purple Campus College of Economics.

== Indonesian senator ==
In the 2004 Indonesian legislative election, she ran for a seat in the newly formed Regional Representative Council, the second branch of the national legislature. She won a seat by receiving the fourth most votes (winning 76,176 votes, which was only 6.17% of the electorate), and was inaugurated as a member on 1 October 2004. As a senator, she fought in favor of education and health regulations which benefitted women and children, and the elimination of violence and trafficking against women and children.

She left office in 2009, after no running for re-election in the 2009 Indonesian legislative election. In 2013, former general and incumbent senator Ferry Tinggogoy died in office, 4 years into his term. The Regional Representative Council then appointed Sientje as senator for the remainder of Tinggogoy's term. She left the office in following the election of new senators in the 2014 Indonesian legislative election.

== See also ==
- Adolf Jouke Sondakh
