= Syahrul =

Indonesian politician (1960–2020)

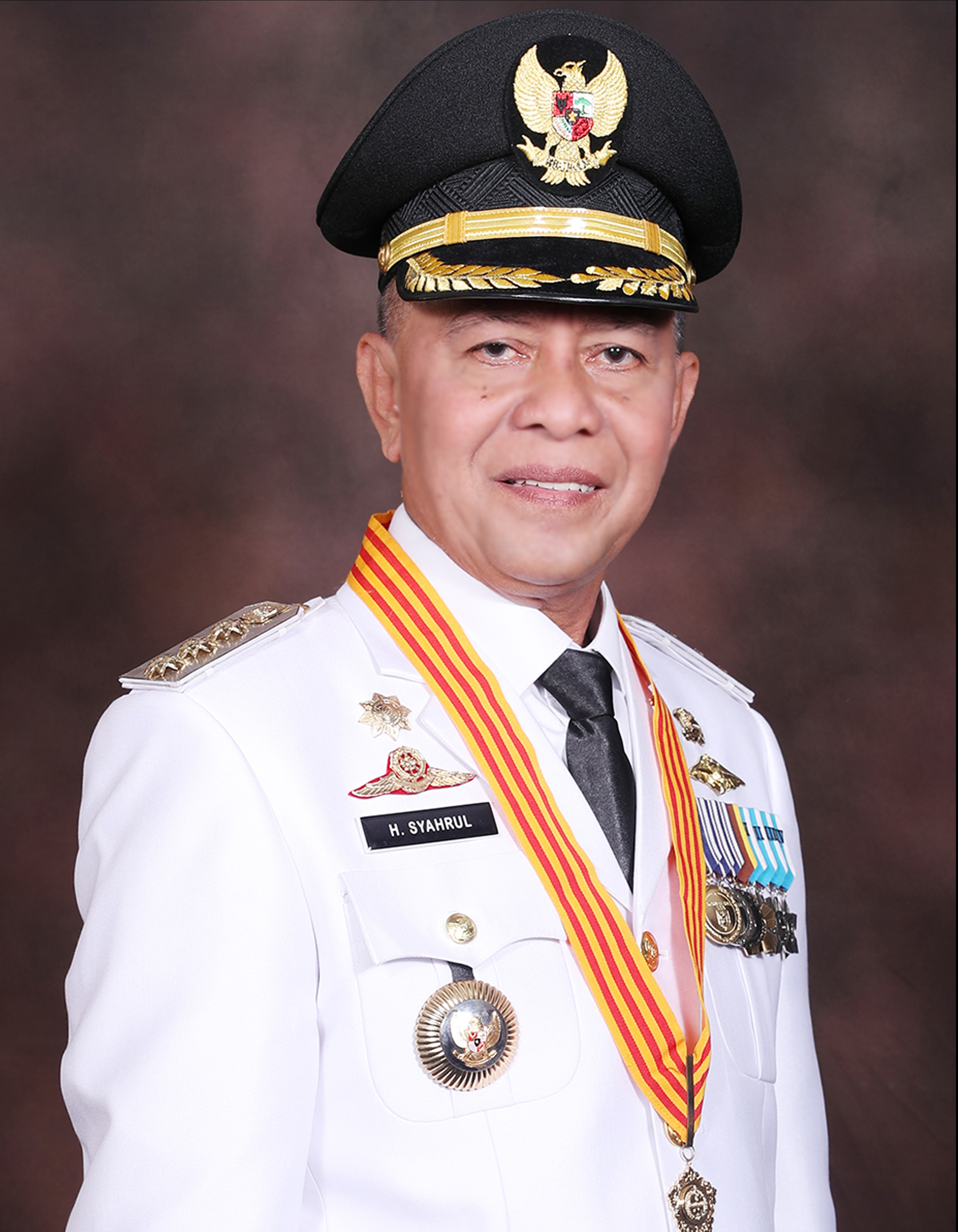

Mayor of Tanjungpinang
- In office 21 September 2018 – 28 April 2020
- Deputy: Rahma
- Preceded by: Raja Ariza (acting)
- Succeeded by: Rahma (acting)

Vice Mayor of Tanjungpinang
- In office 16 January 2013 – 16 January 2018
- Preceded by: Edward Mushalli
- Succeeded by: Rahma

Personal details
- Born: 30 August 1960 Tarempa, Anambas Islands Regency, Riau, Indonesia
- Died: April 28, 2020 (aged 59) Tanjungpinang, Riau Islands, Indonesia
- Party: Great Indonesia Movement Party
- Spouse: Juwariah
- Education: Indonesia Open University (2008)

Syahrul (30 August 1960 – 28 April 2020) was an Indonesian politician and teacher. He served as the mayor of Tanjungpinang, and capital and second largest city in the Riau Islands, from 21 September 2018, until his death from COVID-19 on 28 April 2020. Prior to that office, Syahrul had served as Vice Mayor of Tanjungpinang from 2013 to 2018.

== Biography ==
=== Early life and education ===
Syahrul, who was one of eight siblings, was born in Tarempa, on 30 August 1960. As a child, he sold ice and small cakes to earn extra money for his family. He graduated from Tanjungpinang Teacher Training School (SPG) in 1983 and was appointed a teacher. He later earned a bachelor of education degree from Indonesia Open University in 2008.

=== Career ===
Syahrul served as Vice Mayor of Tanjungpinang from 2013 to 2018 under Mayor Lis Darmansyah.

In 2018, Syahrul became Mayor of Tanjungpinang, while Rahma became the city's deputy mayor. They were inaugurated on 21 September 2018, at the Tanjungpinang regional building for an expected term of 2018–2023.

Mayor Syahrul was hospitalized on 11 April 2020, for shortness of breath. A swab test confirmed that he was positive for COVID-19 during the COVID-19 pandemic in Indonesia several days later. Syahrul's wife, his grandchild, and his doctor also tested positive for COVID-19. Syahrul remained hospitalized in the intensive care unit at Tanjungpinang Regional Hospital until his death on 28 April 2020, at the age of 59. Mayor Syahrul was the second Indonesian regional leader to die due to COVID-19 in April 2020, following the death of North Morowali Regent Aptripel Tumimomor on 2 April.
