= Memet Tanumidjaja =

Indonesian diplomat (1915–2002)

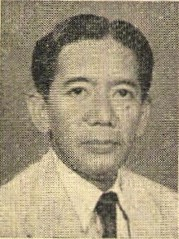
- Tanumidjaja in 1956

Ambassador of Indonesia to Czechoslovakia
- In office 1965–1968
- President: Sukarno; Suharto
- Preceded by: Armunanto
- Succeeded by: Sudio Gandaruni

Director of the State Administration Agency
- In office 1962–1965
- President: Sukarno
- Preceded by: Prajudi Atmosudirdjo
- Succeeded by: Tjoek Soejono Soemodiredjo

Head of Office of Civil Servant Affairs
- In office 1 April 1961 – 25 Oktober 1965
- President: Sukarno
- Preceded by: Marsono
- Succeeded by: Soedirjo

Member of People's Representative Council
- In office 1956–1959
- President: Sukarno
- Constituency: East Java

Personal details
- Born: 15 January 1915 Garut, Dutch East Indies
- Died: 31 August 2002 (aged 87)
- Party: Police Employees' Association of the Republic of Indonesia (P3RI)
- Spouse: Titi Memet Tanumidjaja
- Education: Rechtshoogeschool te Batavia (Mr)

Military service
- Allegiance: Empire of Japan (1942—1945); Indonesia (1945—?)
- Branch/service: Indonesian National Police
- Years of service: 1942—?
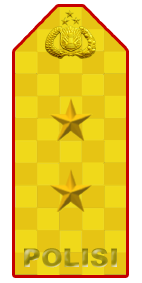
- Rank: Inspector General

Memet Tanumidjaja (15 January 1915 – 31 August 2002), often written Memed Tanumidjaja, was an Indonesian police officer, politician, and diplomat who served as a Member of the People's Representative Council (1956–1959) and Ambassador to Czechoslovakia (1965–1968).

== Early life and education ==
Tanumidjaja was born in Garut on 15 January 1915. He completed his higher education at Rechtshoogeschool te Batavia (Law High School) in Batavia. During the Dutch East Indies era, he joined and was active in the youth movement.

== Policing career ==
Tanumidjaja entered the police service in 1942 as an inspector. He then served as the Chief of Kediri Residency Police in 1945. Upon resigning from the Advisory Council to the Prime Minister, Tanumidjaja was assigned as the Vice Chief of the West Java Regional Police (1953–1956) and then Chief of the South Sumatra Regional Police (1956). During his service in West Java Regional Police, he took part in the Bandung Conference where he was responsible for security matters. He was also one of the members of the Drafting Team for the Traffic ticket system in 1969.

Tanumidjaja was also active in the organization. In 1946, he became a member of the Association of Indonesian Police Employees (P3RI). In 1949, he headed the Emergency Executive Board of the P3RI after the transfer of sovereignty. He also became one of the members of the P3RI Congress Preparatory Committee and served as the vice chairman of P3RI in 1950. He was elected as the Chairman of the Association of Indonesian Police Employees on 16 July 1951, replacing Sosrodanoekoesoemo. On the Association of Indonesian Police Employees Congress held in Semarang in October 1952, he was reelected as the chairman. In 1953, his position within the Association of Indonesian Police Employees board was demoted to Vice Chairman, a position that he served until 1956, and the organization chairman was replaced by Muhammad Basah. After his retirement in an unknown year, he joined the Indonesian Retired Armed Forces Union (Pepabri) and joined its board. In 1981, he and eight other Pepabri board members met with Soeharto and expressed hope that he would be served as president in 1983.

== Government and politics career ==
In 1948, Tanumidjaja was appointed as a member of the Advisory Council to the Prime Minister. Ali Sastroamidjojo named Tanumidjaja as a member of the Drafting Police Legislation on 31 March 1954. Upon the completion of Villa Isola renovation, he was appointed as one of the members of the building board curator.

On 30 April 1960, Tanumidjaja was appointed as the Chairman of the Committee for Drafting the Basic Police Law. He was then assigned as the Head Office of Civil Servant Affairs on 1 April 1961, a position that he served until 25 October 1965. At the same year, he also became a member of National Law Development Planning Agency. In 1962, he was appointed as the director of the State Administration Agency (LAN), permanent advisor of Council for the Placement of Graduates while serving as Head Office of Civil Servant Affairs, and Chairman of Retooling Subcommittees on personnel. Under his leadership, he established cooperation between LAN and Ford Foundation and Indiana University, and LAN established its branch office in Bandung. Apart from that, he also enrolled in a US government-held course around 1962 - 1963.

In 1965, Tanumidjaja resigned from his position as the Director of LAN and became the Ambassador of Indonesia to Czechoslovakia. He sent his credential letters to Jozef Lenárt in Prague on 23 November 1965. He stepped down as an ambassador in 1968 and then returned to the police service. As an ambassador, he revoked students' passports who did not pass the screening test and ordered them to return to Indonesia immediately in 1966.

=== Member of the People's Representative Council ===
In the 1955 Indonesian legislative election, Tanumidjaja was elected as a member of the People's Representative Council from the Police Employees' Association of the Republic of Indonesia (P3RI), representing East Java. During the opening remarks, he stipulated that P3RI believed security was the most essential topic. Moreover, he added that the party opposed the government's plan to have talks with insurgents, as it showed the government's weakness and demanded that the government reconsider the personnel policy issues.

As a member of parliament, he was appointed as a member of the Commission for the Revision of Criminal Law in April 1956. He also fought for the establishment of a Ministry of Internal Security where it would responsible for police matters. When the government declared the State of emergency in 1957, he criticized this government decision as he believed that it was based on political motives and suggested that SOE had to be implemented in certain areas only. He also filed a motion to establish an ad hoc that was aimed to restore cooperation between Sukarno and Mohammad Hatta. His proposal of establishing Ad Hoc Committee for Soekarno-Hatta Cooperation was passed on 29 November 1957 and it consisted of nine members which were Ahem Erningpradja, Anwar Harjono, Anwar Tjokroaminoto, Asraruddin, I.J. Kasimo, Melanchton Siregar, Katamsi Sutisna Sendjaja. In 1958, he proposed the notion of party reforms.

== Death and personal life ==
Tanumidjaja died on 31 August 2002 and was buried in Kalibata Heroes' Cemetery.

Tanumidjaja married Titi Memet Tanumidjaja. He was able to dance Sundanese dances.

== Works ==
- Sedjarah perkembangan Angkatan Kepolisian (1971)

== Bibliography ==
- Tanumidjaja, Memet (1971). Sedjarah perkembangan Angkatan Kepolisian. Jakarta: Pusat Sedjarah ABRI Departemen Pertahanan - Keamanan.
