= Toferry Primanda Soetikno =

Indonesian diplomat (born 1967)

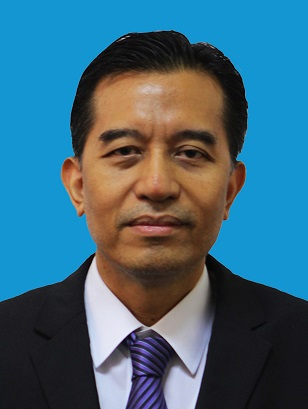

Ambassador of Indonesia to Mexico, Belize, El Salvador, and Guatemala
- Incumbent
- Assumed office 25 August 2025
- Preceded by: Cheppy Wartono

Personal details
- Born: 9 January 1967 (age 59)

Franciscus de Salles Toferry Primanda Soetikno (born 9 January 1967) is an Indonesian diplomat who is currently serving as ambassador to Mexico, with concurrent accreditation to Belize, El Salvador, and Guatemala since 2025. He previously served as deputy chief of mission at the embassy in Bangkok and advisor (expert staff) to House of Representatives speaker Puan Maharani.

== Biography ==
Born on 9 January 1967, Soetikno joined the foreign ministry in March 1992. Between 2006 and 2008, Soetikno was noted to have served at the economic section of the embassy in Tokyo with the rank of first secretary. His career rose swiftly, and by 2011 he became the deputy director (chief of subdirectorate) for international economy and finance within the foreign ministry's development, economy, and environment directorate. He became the acting director of development, economy and environment on 12 April 2012 before being appointed permanently on 10 January 2014. He represented Indonesia in the 2012 Bangkok Climate Change Conference and as a lead negotiator at the 2015 United Nations Climate Change Conference, during which the Indonesian delegation pushed for an on-top funding of the official development assistance. He also assisted the-then newly elected President Joko Widodo during the 2014 G20 Brisbane summit.

Upon serving as director for two years, Soetikno was posted to the embassy in Bangkok, serving as deputy chief of mission under ambassador Ahmad Rusdi. He began his duties on 23 September 2016. Less than two years later, on 12 January 2018 Soetikno was installed as consul general in Hamburg by the foreign minister. He officially assumed duties on 4 April 2018 and received his exequatur on 17 April. During his tenure, Soetikno struck a deal with the Bavaria state government on pilot project on solid waste management and with Daimler Company on car production. The consulate general also intensified its economic promotion by holding promotions in Dusseldorf, Stuttgart, Saarland, Mannheim, and Mainz. Soetikno held office until 31 July 2020.

After serving in Bangkok and Frankfurt, Soetikno became the advisor (special staff) to the House of Representatives speaker Puan Maharani. In August 2024, Soetikno was nominated by President Joko Widodo as ambassador to Vietnam. Although his nomination was approved by the House of Representatives, Soetikno's host country was shifted to Mexico, and Adam Mulawarman Tugio was nominated in his place several months later. He was installed as ambassador to Mexico, with concurrent accreditation to Belize, El Salvador, and Guatemala on 25 August 2025. Soetikno received his duties from chargé d'affaires ad interim Bimo Ariawan on 7 November 2025 and provided copies of his credentials to the director general of protocol of Mexico Jonathan Chait Auerbach on 11 November 2025. He officially began his duties with a presentation of credentials to president Claudia Sheinbaum of Mexico on 16 April 2026, governor general Froyla Tzalam of Belize on 23 July 2026, and president Bernardo Arévalo of Guatemala on 7 September 2026.
