= Rukmini (air force officer) =

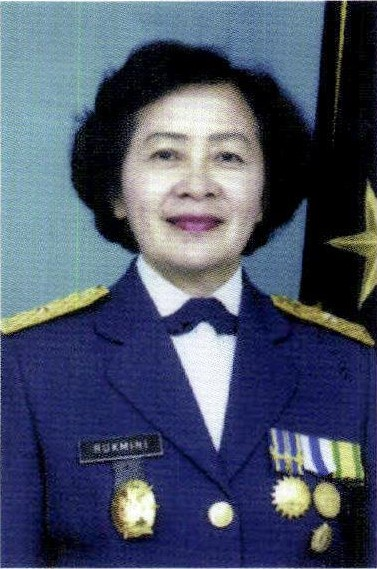

Member of the People's Representative Council
- In office 1 October 1997 – 23 Oktober 2002
- President: Suharto; B. J. Habibie; Abdurrahman Wahid; Megawati Sukarnoputri
- Succeeded by: Rochmulyati
- Parliamentary group: Armed Forces/Police
- Constituency: Madiun

Personal details
- Born: May 31, 1949 (age 76) Pacitan, State of East Java

Military service
- Allegiance: Indonesia
- Branch/service: Air Force
- Years of service: 1976—2002
- Rank: First Marshal

Rukmini (born 31 May 1949) is an Indonesian air force officer who became the member of the People's Representative Council from 1997 until 2002. She was the first female to hold a flag officer post in the Indonesian Air Force.

== Early life ==
Rukmini was born on 31 May 1949 as the daughter of Karso Dikromo. She attended junior high school in Pacitan from 1962 until 1965 and high school in Bandung from 1967 until 1970. After finishing high school, she studied at the Electrical Technic Faculty of the Bandung Institute of Teacher Training and Education. She graduated from the institute in 1975 with a degree in education.

== Military career ==
Following his graduation from the institute, Rukmini enrolled at the female air force education center and began serving at the air force since 1976. Her first position in the air force was as the head of the data development bureau until 1978. Other positions that she held was the Head of Indonesian Air Force General Staff College Secretariat from 1987 until 1988 and as the Head of the Female Air Force Members Development Bureau from 1994 until 1997.

Throughout her career in the air force, Rukmini attended the Indonesian Air Force Command and General Staff College, Armed Forces' Social and Political Course, and IBMC course. She also attended the Social and Political Faculty of the Indonesia Open University and graduated with a bachelor's degree in 1995.

== Member of the People's Representative Council ==
On 1 October 1997, Rukmini was installed as the member of the People's Representative Council from the Armed Forces/Police parliamentary group with the rank of lieutenant colonel. Shortly afterwards, she was promoted to the rank of colonel. She was reappointed for a second term in 1999 and was subsequently promoted to the rank of first marshal, thus becoming the first female to hold a marshal rank in the Indonesian air forces. She was replaced from the council on 23 October 2002 and briefly became an expert staff for judicial affairs to the air force chief of staff before retiring from the military.

== Personal life ==
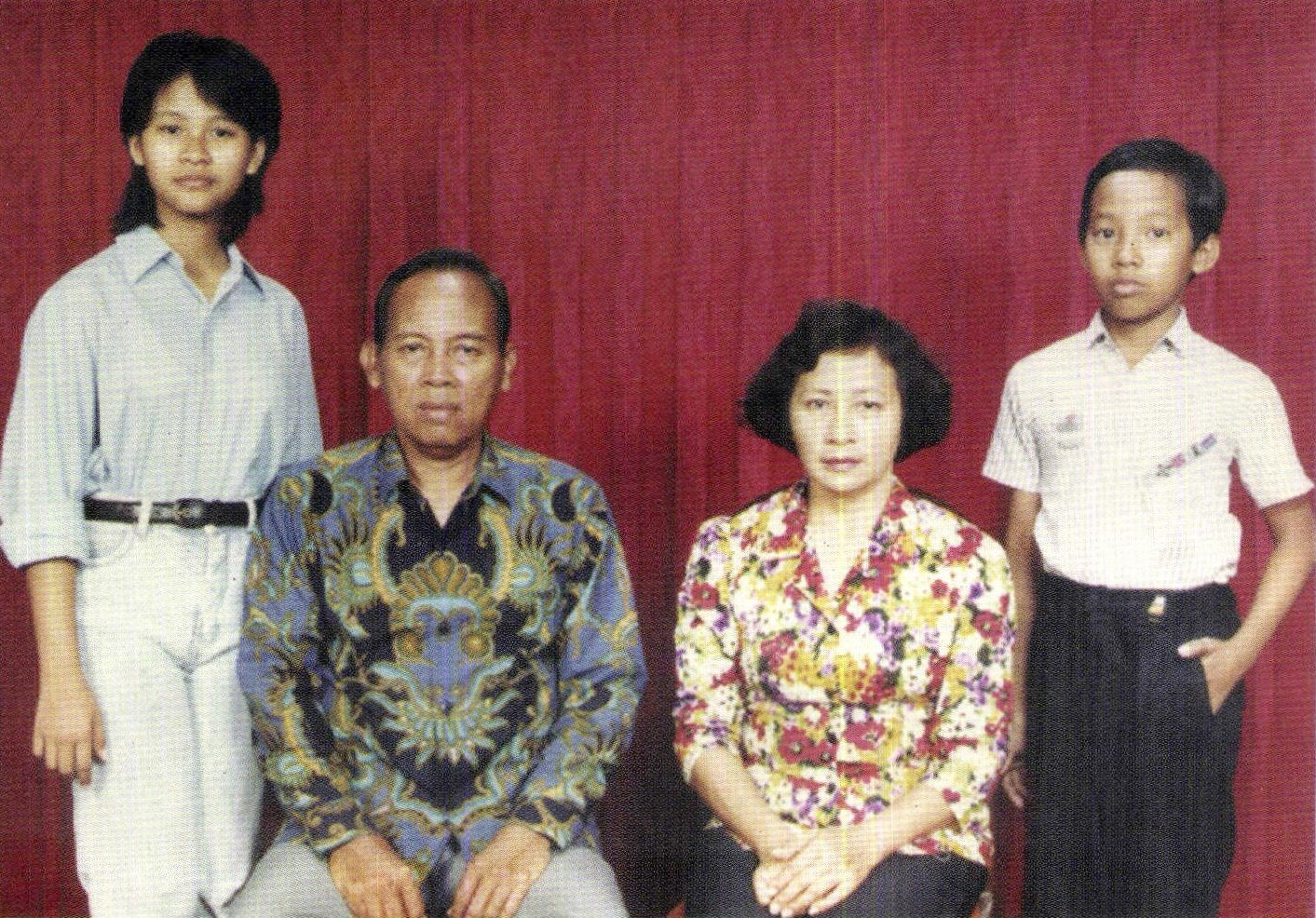
Rukmini and her family.

Rukmini was married to Imam Wahyudi, a flag officer in the Indonesian Air Force with the rank of junior marshal. The couple has two children, namely Frita Yuliati (born 1979) and Rahmat Basuki (born 1982).
