= Bambang Santoso =

Indonesian politician (born 1969)

H. Bambang Santoso S.Pd.I, M.A
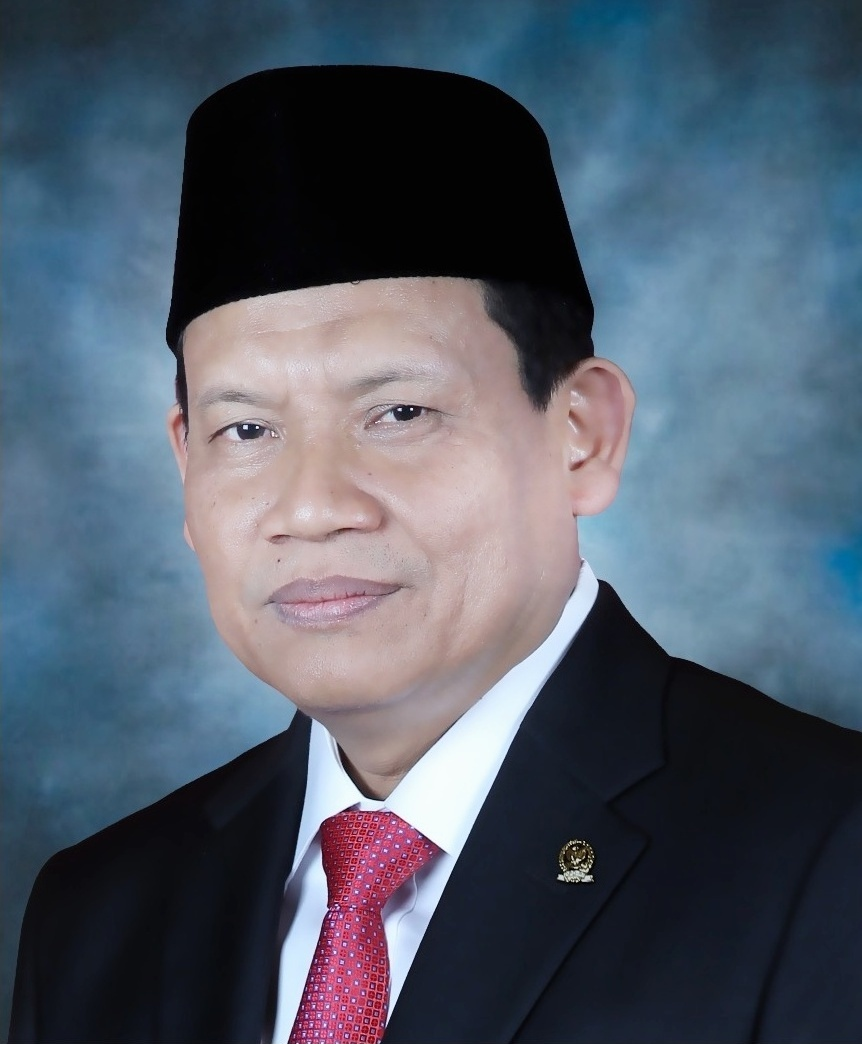

Senator for Bali
- Incumbent
- Assumed office 1 October 2019
- President: Joko Widodo

Personal details
- Born: 1 December 1969 (age 56) Jepara, Indonesia
- Party: Independent
- Spouse: Rusmalina
- Education: Institut Ilmu Sosial dan Manajemen STIAMI; STAIS Lan Taboer; Universitas Terbuka; Universitas Warmadewa
- Occupation: Politician; Entrepreneur; Member of DPD RI; Member of MPR RI; Senator Indonesia
- Website: www.dpd.go.id www.bambangsantoso.id

H. Bambang Santoso, S.Pd.I, M.A or known as Haji Bambang Santoso is a Senator of Indonesia, a Balinese Muslim community leader and an entrepreneur who has long been involved in various organizations and non-governmental organizations from regional to national degree. (born in Jepara, Central Java, 1 December 1969;) Santoso has been named the first Muslim representative in history to sit on the seat of the Regional Representative Council of the Republic of Indonesia representing Bali Province for the 2019–2024 period.

Santoso is the chairman of the Indonesian Mosque Council of the Bali Province and also a member of advisory council of the Indonesian Ulema Council in the province of Bali.

After being elected and appointed as members of the DPD-RI and MPR-RI at the MPR/DPR/DPD assembly building, Senayan, Jakarta, 1 October 2019, Santoso pledged and signed that during his tenure he would donate 100% of his basic salary to an independent institution in Province of Bali and it will be distributed and felt by the community more widely.

== Biography ==
Bambang Santoso is the youngest son of a very poor family. He migrated to Bali and started his business from zero with his wife who originally came from Klungkung, Bali. He is known to be an active and neutral figure. He is also known as the chairman of ta'mir of Baitul Makmur Mosque in Denpasar, Bali, the most popular mosque for congregational prayers at dawn in Indonesia.

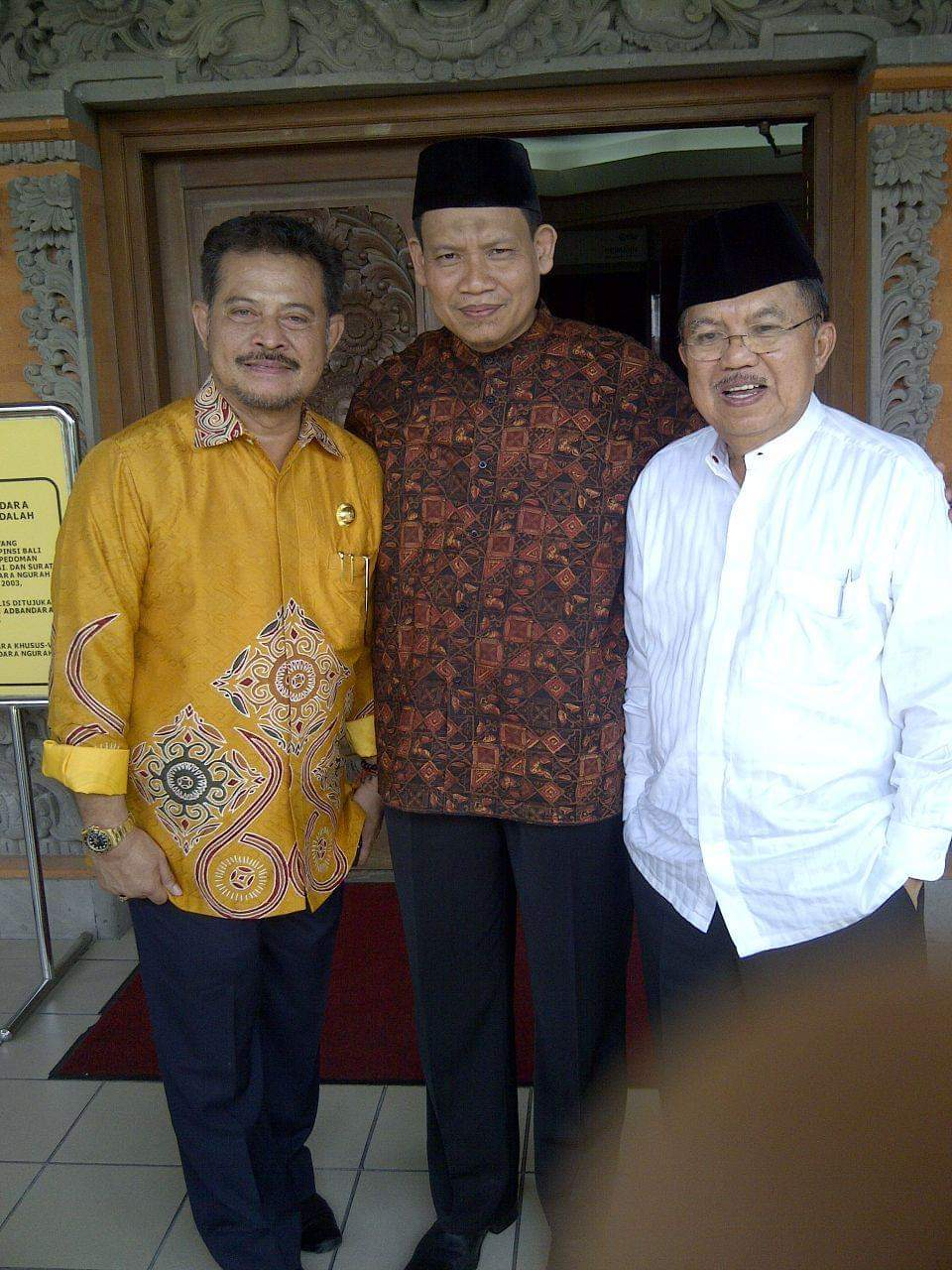

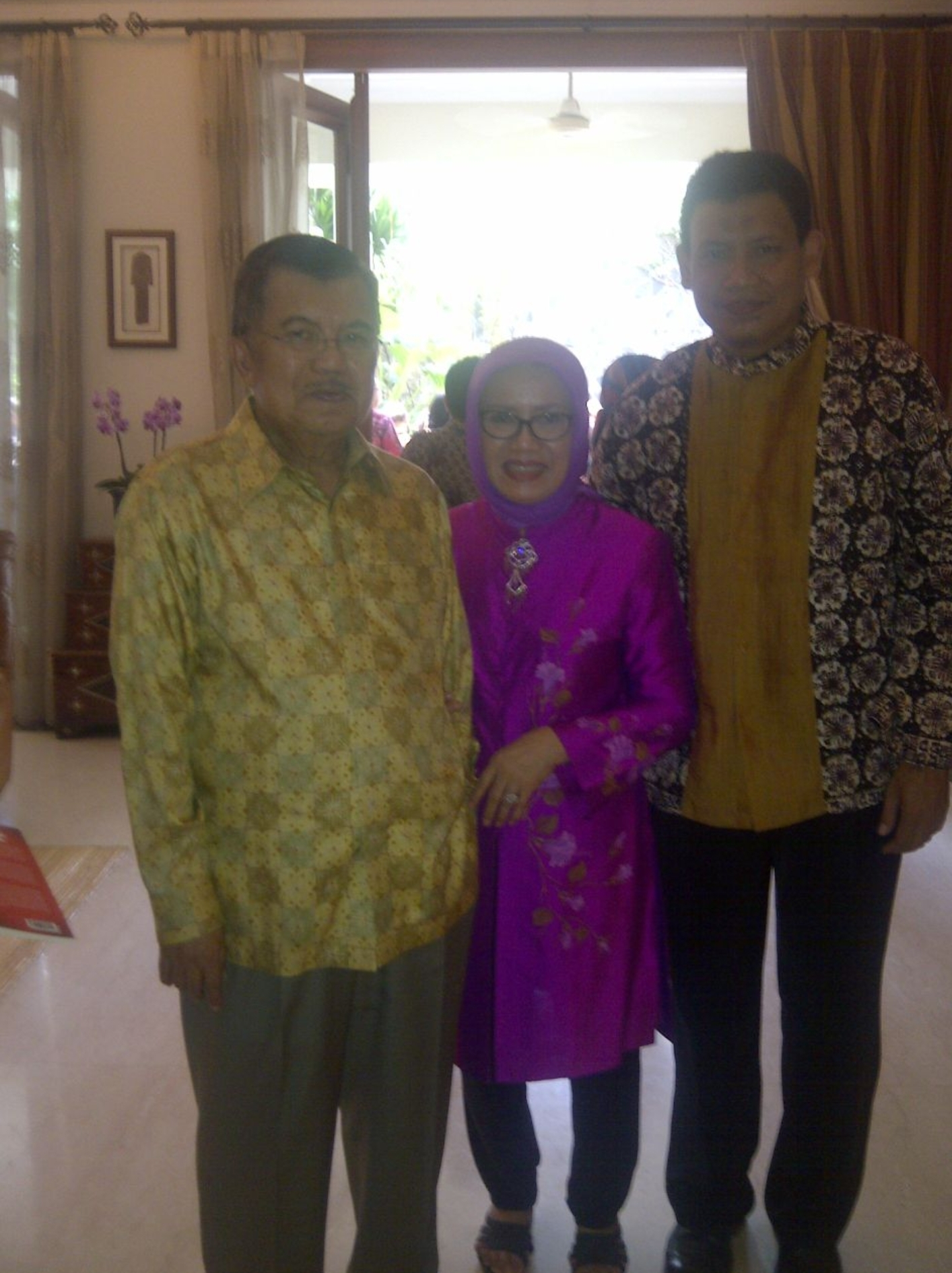

Bambang Santoso is also known to be close to Indonesian Vice President Jusuf Kalla, he often meets Jusuf Kalla both at his home and at the vice president's palace to discuss matters of community and mosques.

== Educational background ==
- Universitas Terbuka (1998)
- Universitas Warmadewa – English Language Program (Bachelor Program)
- STAIS Lan Taboer – Religious Education (Bachelor Program)
- STIAMI Bekasi – Public Administration (Master Program with summa cum laude result)
