= Agustiar Sabran =

Indonesian politician

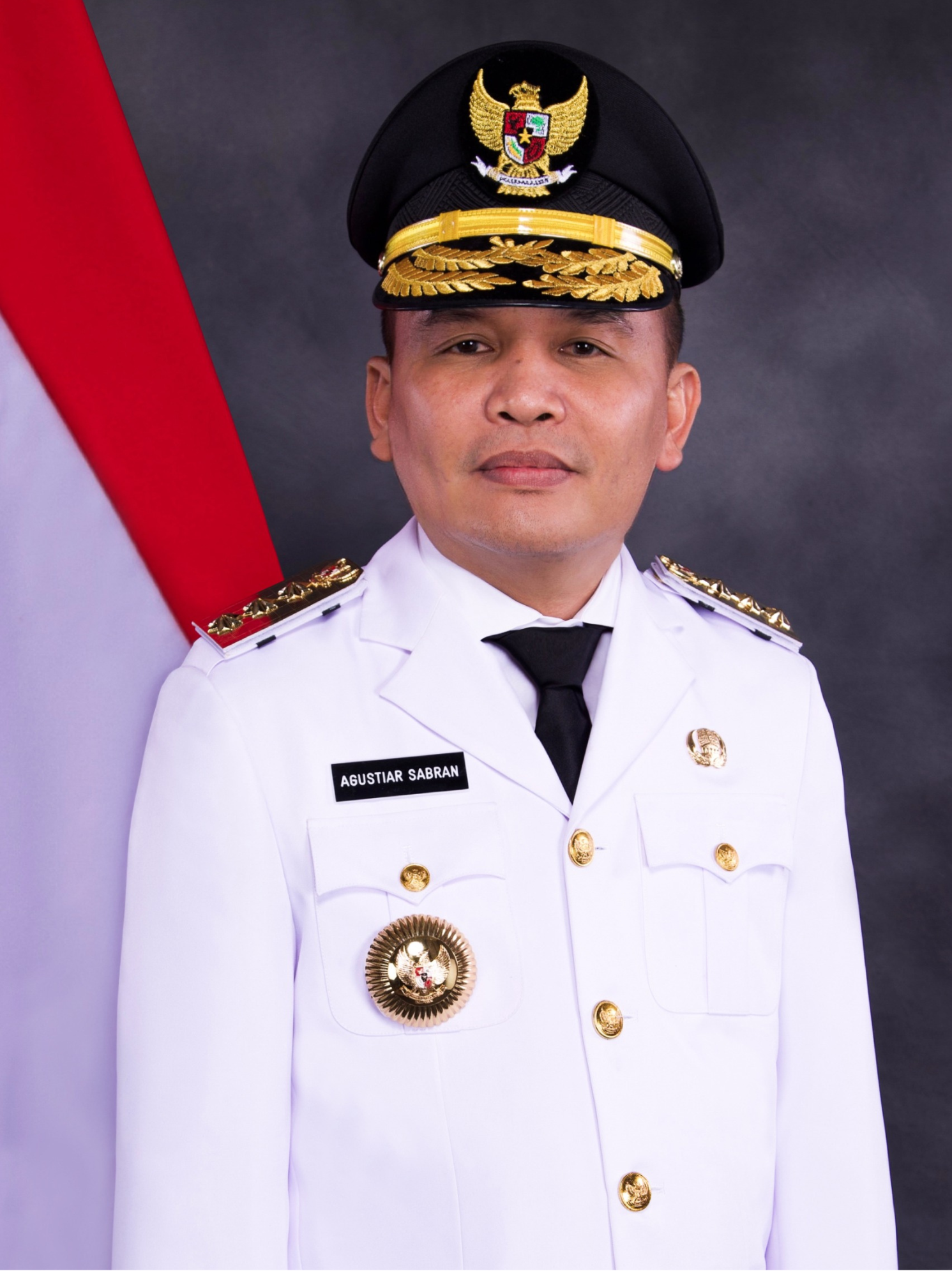

Governor of Central Kalimantan
- Incumbent
- Assumed office 20 February 2025
- President: Prabowo Subianto
- Deputy: Edy Pratowo
- Preceded by: Sugianto Sabran

Member of House of Representatives
- In office 1 October 2019 – 1 October 2024
- Constituency: Central Kalimantan

Personal details
- Born: 17 August 1972 (age 53) Sampit, Central Kalimantan, Indonesia
- Party: Gerindra (2024–present)
- Other political affiliations: KIM Plus (2024–present); PDI-P (before 2024)
- Relatives: Sugianto Sabran (brother)

Agustiar Sabran (born 17 August 1972) is an Indonesian politician and businessman who is the governor of Central Kalimantan, serving since February 2025. He had previously served between 2019 and 2024 in the House of Representatives representing the province. He is an elder brother of the previous governor, Sugianto Sabran.

== Early life ==
Agustiar Sabran was born in Sampit on 17 August 1972 in a Dayak family. His father was Sabran Afandi Achmud (1942–2020). He graduated middle school in Sampit in 1988, but did not resume his studies for a while, receiving his high school diploma from an adult school program in 2003 and receiving a bachelors' in communications in 2012 from Indonesia Open University.

== Career ==
Sabran entered the mining business, becoming chairman of Central Kalimantan's association of mining entrepreneurs. He was also CEO of Kalteng Putra F.C., and led the province's Dayak cultural council.

In the 2019 Indonesian legislative election, Sabran ran as a PDI-P candidate for the House of Representatives in Central Kalimantan, and was elected with 70,625 votes. He was sworn in on 1 October 2019. He ran for a second term in the 2024 election, being reelected with 97,772 votes. Before taking office, however, he resigned from PDI-P in July 2024, before he could be sworn in for a second term.

Sabran's resignation was due to his bid in the 2024 Central Kalimantan gubernatorial election, where he was backed by Gerindra. He won the election, securing 35.5 percent of votes and defeating PDI-P's candidate. He was sworn in as governor on 20 February 2025 along with most other elected regional leaders.

== Personal life ==
Agustiar's younger brother, Sugianto Sabran, had served as Central Kalimantan's governor before him. Sabran had married at least twice, with his second wife Thisia Halijam (b. 1999) which he married in 2021 being younger than his eldest son from prior marriage Deden Agustiar (b. 1998), and had at least two sons and two daughters. Another son, Asef Wigustianto, died in 2024.
