= Mohammad Rudy Salahuddin =

Indonesian politician

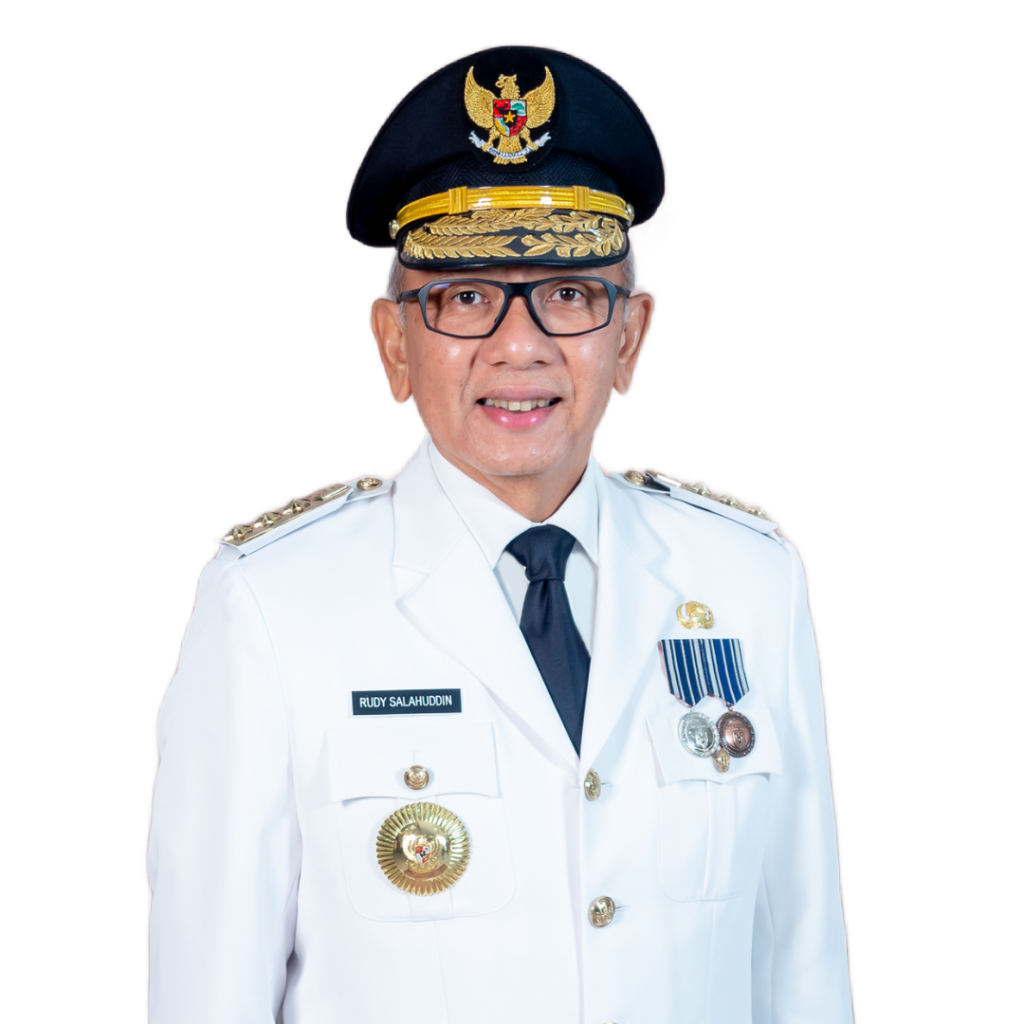

Acting Governor of Gorontalo Province
- In office 17 May 2024 – 20 February 2025
- President: Joko Widodo; Prabowo Subianto
- Preceded by: Ismail Pakaya (acting)
- Succeeded by: Gusnar Ismail

Deputy of Coordination of Digital Economy, Employment, and Micro, Small, and Medium Businesses for the Indonesian Coordinating Ministry for Economic Affairs
- Incumbent
- Assumed office June 2020
- President: Joko Widodo; Prabowo Subianto

Personal details
- Born: July 11, 1968 (age 58) Jakarta, Indonesia
- Spouse: Djoewiati Kentjana Soebrata
- Children: 1
- Education: University of Indonesia; George Washington University
- Occupation: Politician; Academic

Mohammad Rudy Salahuddin (born 11 July 1969) is an Indonesian politician. He has served as the acting governor of the Gorontalo Province since 17 May 2024. He has also served as the deputy of coordination of digital economy, employment, and micro, small, and medium businesses for the Indonesian Coordinating Ministry for Economic Affairs since June 2020.

== Education ==
Salahuddin attended elementary school at SD Regina Pacis, junior high school at SMP Islam Al-Azhar, senior high school at SMA Negeri 3.

Salahuddin received a bachelor's degree in civil engineering from the University of Indonesia in 1993. He also received a bachelor's degree in law from Indonesia Open University.

He received his master's degree in 1995 and continued to receive his doctorate degree in 2002, both in engineering management from George Washington University. He is also a Principal Professional Engineer (IPU).

== Personal life ==
He married Djoewiati Kentjana Soebrata in 1999.

== Political career ==
- Planning Staff, Transportation and Transportation Bureau, Bappenas RI, 1996-2002
- Head of Multimedia and Informatics Section, Bappenas RI, 2002
- Head of Post and Telematics Sub Directorate, Bappenas RI, 2002-2006
- Head of Energy Development and Utilization Sub Directorate, Bappenas RI, 2006-2007
- Director of Promotion Development, BKPM RI, 2007-2010
- Director of Service and Area Planning, BKPM RI, 2011-2012
- Director of Exhibition and Promotion Facilities, BKPM RI, 2010 - 2011
- Director of Promotion Development, BKPM RI, 2012 - 2014
- Director of Infrastructure Planning, BKPM RI, 2014 - 2015
- Deputy of Coordination of Creative Economy, Employment, and Cooperative Competitiveness for Micro, Small, and Medium Enterprises for the Indonesian Coordinating Ministry for Economic Affairs, 2015 - 2020
- Deputy of Coordination of Digital Economy, Employment, and Micro, Small, and Medium Businesses for the Indonesian Coordinating Ministry for Economic Affairs, 2020–present
- Acting Governor of Gorontalo Province, 2024–present

== Non-political career ==
- Commissioner, PT. PNM Venture Capital, 2009 - 2014
- Commissioner, PT. Asuransi Tugu Pratama Indonesia, Tbk., 2010 - 2020
- Commissioner, PT. PNM Ventura Syariah, 2014 - 2018
- Commissioner, PT. SUCOFINDO (Persero), 2016 - 2020
- Commissioner, PT. PLN (Persero), 2020 - 2021
- Member of the supervisory board, PERUM PERURI, 2021 - 2023
- Commissioner, PT. Jasa Raharja, 2023 - 2024
