= Italian Senior Civil Service =

In Italy the Senior Civil Service or "la dirigenza" is the set of high-ranking executives (“Dirigenti”) who are in charge of the top and middle management of national or local governmental offices.

== Structure ==
Senior executives come in two echelons:

- First level: Directors Generals and Chief of Departments (about 400 executives)
- Second level: Directors of Division and heads of peripheral units (about 3,500 executives)

First and second level positions are identified in each ministry. Management responsibilities (supervision of one or more bureaux) determine whether or not someone is an executive, not qualifications. This objective approach shows the exact number of first level executives and permits the development of a database with up-to-date information about age, seniority, gender, level and ministry. In each ministry, second level positions are further classified accordingly to the responsibilities attached to their offices position, corresponding to the classification adopted by the ministry.

Until October 2002, the Senior Civil Service was meant to be an inter-ministerial homogeneous body, managed by a pool known as the "Ruolo Unico dei Dirigenti" (Uniform Register). The creation of this structure, under the supervision of the Prime Minister, was the backbone of the reform conducted from 1993 till 2001. It was underpinned by a database of jobs and profiles. This tool allowed the government to publish available positions in real time and to establish a labour market for managers. The new text adopted in 2002 has replaced inter-ministerial management of executives with ministerial management. However, the inter-ministerial database and the labour market for first level executives have been kept.

Other public bodies, at national and local level, have their Senior Civil Services. Today senior civil servants are grouped into eight different contractual areas:

- I (Ministries),
- II (Regions and Territorial Autonomies),
- III (National Health Service - administrative),
- IV (National Health Service - medical),
- V (School),
- VI (Fiscal and economic Agencies),
- VII (University),
- VIII (Prime Minister's Office).

Civil servants below executive level have a different contract with separate grading and pay arrangements.

== Recruitment ==
Executives are normally recruited through competitions. There are two types of competition:

- the “Fast Stream Programme” (“Corso-Concorso di Formazione Dirigenziale”) is for people who join the Public Administration School ("Scuola Superiore della Pubblica Amministrazione") after a highly selective national exam, immediately getting a senior rank position. The curriculum of this school covers 30 months of alternating theoretical training - mostly in organisational sociology - and practical training - with many hands-on problems - and internships, often at the European Commission or other international bodies. On completion, students have to pass another examination. Depending on their results, graduates select their future ministry. The level required for every applicant is a master's. Applicants may be students, Italian or foreign government executives or private sector managers. The Public Administration School actively encourages the emergence of a team spirit in all basic training programmes. Graduates from the first classes have set up an association whose aim is to disseminate innovation in the public administration. Moreover, courses are not only taught by government executives but also by academic researchers, which leads to training partnerships with the universities;
- the second type is a competition organised by the ministries. The prerequisites and training standards are less strict than as for the first type. Candidates who pass this competition follow a programme of almost one year at the Public Administration School.

The executive group is increasingly targeting people from the private sector, universities and regional entities, which currently account for 10% of first level executives and 8% of second level. External candidates can only be hired for a fixed term.

== Appointment and tenure ==
The status of executives has been governed by private law since 1998. A collective bargaining agreement (drafted by ARAN, the agency representing the public employer and the executives' trade union), stipulates the management conditions required in individual contracts. In other words, a senior executive signs two contracts:

- a permanent contract with the ministry where he is employed;
- a fixed-term contract with his or her supervisor (secretary-general of the ministry for first level executives, and first level executives for second level executives).

Fixed-term contracts may not exceed three years for first level executives and five years for executives. These contracts set out the remuneration terms. In 2002, the minister was given the job of setting objectives, which must be very precise, reducing the role of the contract. Achievement of the objectives is nevertheless verified every year based on management control and strategic-planning results.

First level SEOs must be confirmed by every new government, or they lose their position.

== Performance assessment and pay ==
The pay structure emphasizes workload, merit and work performance ("pay for performance"), while it has no regard to seniority and length of service.

Pay is based on:

- a fixed wage (60% of the remuneration);
- a portion (20%) linked to the responsibility attached to the position, corresponding to different pay grades adopted by the ministry (three levels at the Civil Service Ministry - A-B-C - and five at the Finance Ministry - A-B-C-D-E). This classification is transparent and published by every ministry;
- a percentage (20%) tied to the achievement of objectives.

Executives are subjected to an annual assessment based on achievement of objectives, the adequacy of actions implemented in compliance with ministerial directives and the information supplied by the management-control and strategic-assessment service. Executives whose contract expires are assessed to determine whether to keep and/or to promote them.

Assessment disputes are reviewed by an appeal committee.

When an executive cannot immediately find a new position on termination of a fixed-term contract, he /she keeps part of his fixed wage (60% of the remuneration).

== Promotion and mobility ==
An executive's career does not follow a straight line. On completion of a fixed-term contract, he or she can move from a grade C position to a grade A position if assessment results are highly satisfactory. In order to encourage both internal promotion and competition, 40% of the positions of director generals may be filled by second level executives and 10% by non-government personalities.

When the "rotation" obligation was formally withdrawn in the decree of October 2002 (probably because of shorter contracts), the principle of mobility was preserved. It is supported by an inter-ministerial database with real-time vacancies at every ministry. Five-year stints in the private sector and international organisations are also encouraged. These do not affect the executive's career.

== Training and learning ==
Continuing education is covered by a directive from 2001 whose purpose was to galvanise training plans, considered a primary tool for leading change at government services. Today, training must be mentioned in resumes published in the interministerial database. The purpose of this requirement is to give executives a strong incentive to get trained. In order to promote the use of management methodologies and recognition of international concerns in executive actions, executives are now entitled to work for up to five years in the private sector or in international organisations with the right to return to the executive group without loss of prerogatives.

Lastly, line managers can become researchers. A plan launched by the Public Administration School allows interested executives to research useful government modernisation themes under research teachers.

== History ==
=== Background of reforms ===
In February 1993, a founding legislative decree introduced contracts for officials who are now employed under general labour laws.

- a new agency, ARAN, which represents the public employer in negotiations with unions and is responsible for drafting collective bargaining agreements;
- a separation between political responsibilities (indirizzo politico) and administrative responsibilities (responsabilità dirigenziale );
- a new senior management profile: new values, new responsibilities, new management methods;
- the development of an inter-ministerial pool of executives responsible "for the results of the activity managed by their offices and the execution of programmes and projects entrusted to them in the light of productivity objectives and for financial, technical and administrative management results, including organisational and personnel management decisions."

=== Reform initiatives and results ===
While the decree of 1993 remains the basis for every senior management reform, three periods can be distinguished, each of which raised contractualisation to a new level:

a) 1993 to 1998: the "privatisation" recommended in the working note did not yet apply to first level executives. Their appointments and performance obligations remained the minister's responsibility. Their pay reflected standard scales. Other managers were governed by collective bargaining agreements.

b) 1998 to 2002: collective bargaining agreements became applicable to first level executives. They signed fixed-term contracts under private law specifying objectives and pay. The reform created an inter-ministerial management structure. In principle, all executives should have been lumped in this pool, which the ministries could have sourced for needed profiles. In fact, the ministries remained in control, trying to keep their best executives. Mobility was boosted by the development of an inter-ministerial database with the resumes of all first level executives and a list of available positions updated in real time. The years ahead can be expected to lead gradually to the creation of a genuine labour market.

c) Since October 2002: the appointment and objectives of first level executives are fixed by decree (unilateral public act). Their pay is negotiated bilaterally and laid down in a private contract signed for the term of their appointment (3 years or less). The "ruolo unico dei dirigenti" has made way for ministerial pools but the inter-ministerial database continues to be used. The objective remains to promote mobility.

=== Objectives and new competencies ===
The newly organised "dirigenza" became the launch pad for the modernisation of public management. The new management of senior management has made the civil service more politically neutral and, as such, has clarified the respective roles of politics and the civil service. The main purpose of the newly created dirigenza was to remedy the lack of professionalism and the political bias of the hallowed senior public service by fostering a culture of excellence within the government and promoting close relations based on shared principles combining the founding values of the civil service - integrity, neutrality and impartiality - with the more pragmatic qualities demanded from managers. This ethics of accountability remains the cornerstone of all texts adopted since 1993.

== See also ==
- Civil Service
- Government of Italy
- Dutch Senior Civil Service
