= National Civil Service Agency =

Government agency of Indonesia

- Badan Kepegawaian Negara; BKN
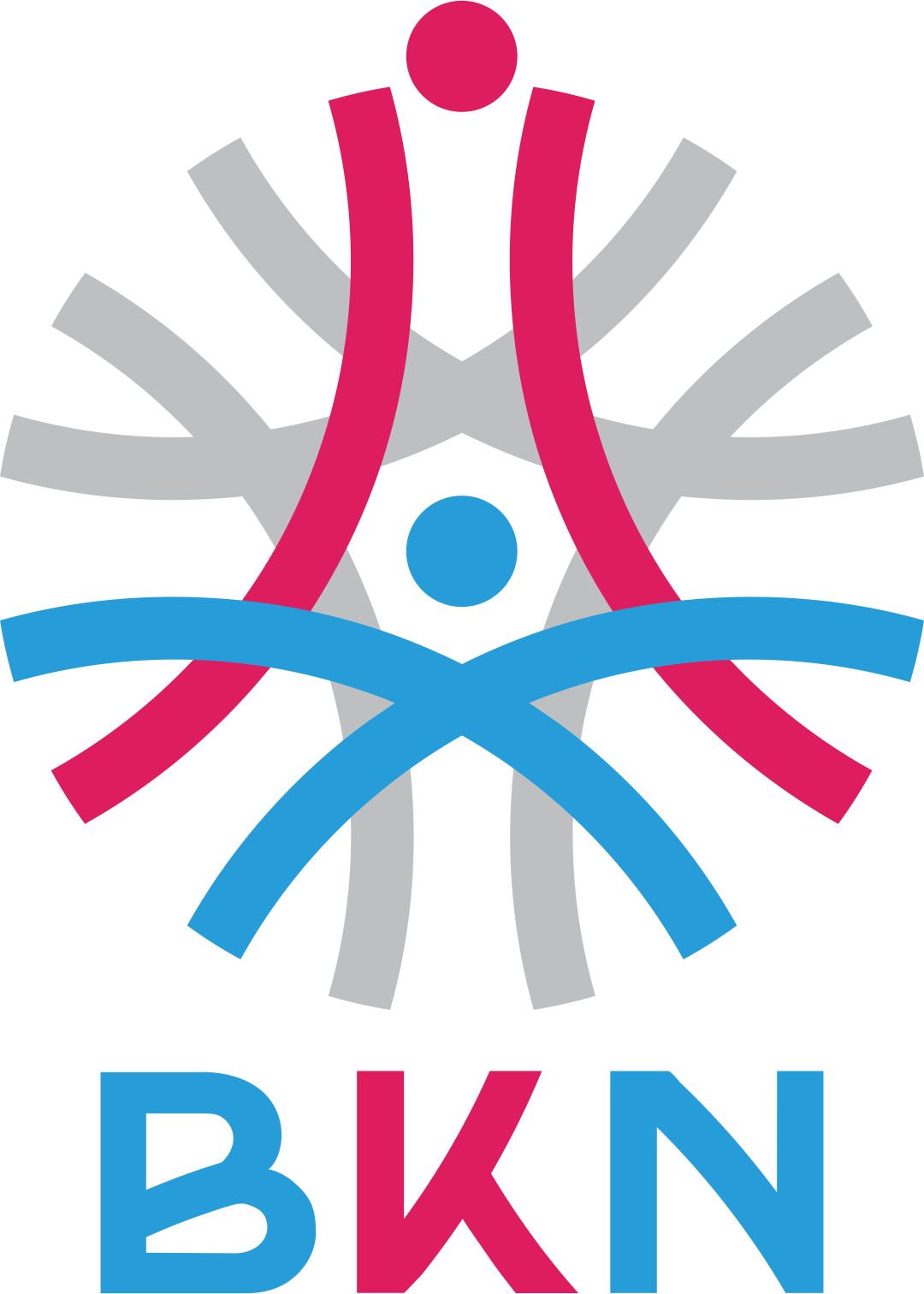

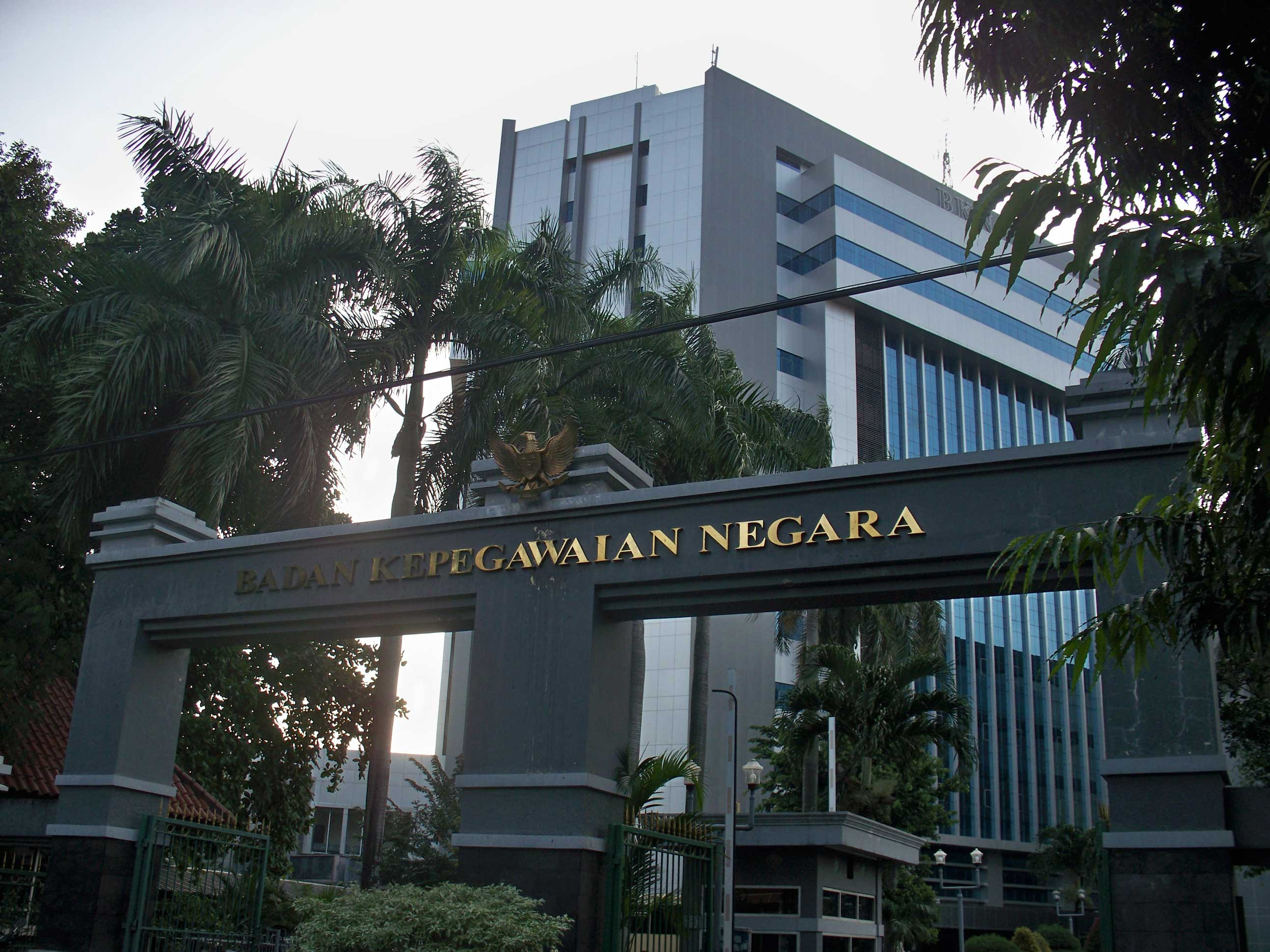
- BKN headquarters near Cawang, East Jakarta

Agency overview
- Formed: 30 May 1948
- Type: Non-ministerial government body
- Jurisdiction: Government of Indonesia
- Headquarters: Jl. Mayjen Sutoyo No. 12, Jakarta Timur 13640, Jakarta, Indonesia
- Agency executive: Zudan Arif Fakrulloh, Head of National Civil Service Agency
- Parent department: Ministry of State Apparatus Utilization and Bureaucratic Reform
- Website: www.bkn.go.id

The National Civil Service Agency (Indonesian: Badan Kepegawaian Negara, BKN) is a non-ministry government body in Indonesia for civil servant management. The equivalent counterpart are Civil Service in United Kingdom.

== History ==
During Indonesian National Revolution, the civil service was divided into Republic of Indonesia government and Dutch East Indies government. The Indonesian government formed Office of Civil Servant Affairs (Indonesian: Kantor Urusan Pegawai Negeri, KUP) with Government Regulation 11/1948 on 30 May 1948 which located at Yogyakarta. The Dutch East Indies government formed General Staff Service (Dutch: Dienst voor Algemene Personele, DAPZ, Indonesian: Djawatan Umum Urusan Pegawai, DUUP), by the Decree of the Governor General of the Dutch East Indies Number 13 dated June 9, 1948, headed by Mr. J.W. Van Hoogstraken and located in Jakarta. After dissolution of United States of Indonesia on 15 August 1950, government saw that the need for centralization in Jakarta, thus merged DUUP into KUP and relocated to Jakarta. In 1972, KUP was transformed into National Civil Service Administration Agency (Indonesian: Badan Administrasi Kepegawaian Negara, BAKN). Later, BAKN transformed into National Civil Service Agency (Indonesian: Badan Kepegawaian Nasional, BKN).

In October 2021, National Civil Service Agency detected fraud on Civil Servant Selection. For this reason, NCSA had made breakthrough innovations with face recording technology from registration to the implementation of the exam. Later, NCSA disqualified 225 candidates due to fraud.

== Responsibility and function ==
NCSA has the task of carrying out government duties in the field of state personnel management in accordance with the provisions of the legislation. In carrying out its duties, NCSA carries out the following functions:

- preparation and determination of technical policies in the field of personnel management;
- implementation of procurement, transfer, dismissal and retirement, as well as the legal status and position of civil servants;
- administration of pensions, state officials and former state officials;
- implementation of the personnel management information system;
- implementation of supervision and control of the implementation of personnel management;
- implementation of potential mapping and competency assessment of civil servants;
- organizing and developing a civil servant recruitment system;
- research and development in the field of personnel management;
- implementation of legal aid;
- providing education and training in the field of personnel management;
- fostering and administering administrative support to all organizational units within the NCSA; and
- supervision of the implementation of their duties.

== Governance ==
=== Minister of State Apparatus Utilization and Bureaucratic Reform ===
Minister of State Apparatus Utilization and Bureaucratic Reform is not part of the civil service as it is a political position.

=== Head of National Civil Service Agency ===
Head of National Civil Service Agency is the highest civil servant in National Civil Service Agency.

- R.P. Soeroso (1948–1950)
- Marsono (1950–1960)
- Memet Tanumidjaja (1961–1965)
- Soedirjo (1965–1972)
- A.E. Manihuruk (1972–1987)
- Waskito Reksosudirdjo (1987–1994)
- Soenarko (1994–1999)
- Sofian Effendi (1999–2000)
- Prijono Tjipto Herijanto (2000–2002)
- Sunarti (2002)
- Hardijanto (2002–2004)
- Prapto Hadi (2005–2007)
- Edy Topo Ashari (2007–2012)
- Eko Sutrisno (2012–2015)
- Bima Haria Wibisana (2015–2025)
- Zudan Arif Fakrulloh (2025–)

== Organisation ==
The National Civil Service Agency consists of:

- Chairman
- Vice Chairman
- Main Secretariat Office
  - Bureau of Planning and Organisation (Indonesian: Biro Perencanaan dan Organisasi)
  - Bureau of Finance (Indonesian: Biro Keuangan)
  - Bureau of Human Resources (Indonesian: Biro Sumber Daya Manusia)
  - Bureau of General Affairs (Indonesian: Biro Umum)
  - Bureau of Public Relation, Law, and Cooperation (Indonesian: Biro Hubungan Masyarakat, Hukum, dan Kerja Sama)
- Deputy of Civil Service Management Guidance (Indonesian: Deputi Bidang Pembinaan Manajemen Kepegawaian
- Deputy of Civil Service Reposition (Indonesian: Deputi Bidang Mutasi Kepegawaian)
- Deputy of Civil Service Information System (Indonesian: Deputi Bidang Sistem Informasi Kepegawaian)
- Deputy of Supervision and Control (Indonesian: Deputi Bidang Pengawasan dan Pengendalian)
- Inspectorate
- Center of Civil Servant Requirement Planning (Indonesian: Pusat Perencanaan Kebutuhan Aparatur Sipil Negara)
- Center of Functional Civil Service Guidance (Indonesian: Pusat Pembinaan Jabatan Fungsional Kepegawaian)
- Center of Selection System Development (Indonesian: Pusat Pengembangan Sistem Seleksi)
- Center of Civil Servant Competence Assessment (Indonesian: Pusat Penilaian Kompetensi Aparatur Sipil Negara)
- Center of Civil Service Development (Indonesian: Pusat Pengembangan Kepegawaian Aparatur Sipil Negara)
- Center of Civil Service Management Research (Indonesian: Pusat Pengkajian Manajemen Aparatur Sipil Negara)
- Center of Civil Service Legal Consultation and Assistance (Indonesian: Pusat Konsultasi dan Bantuan Hukum Kepegawaian)

== Galerry ==
Logo of National Civil Service Agency (2014–2023)

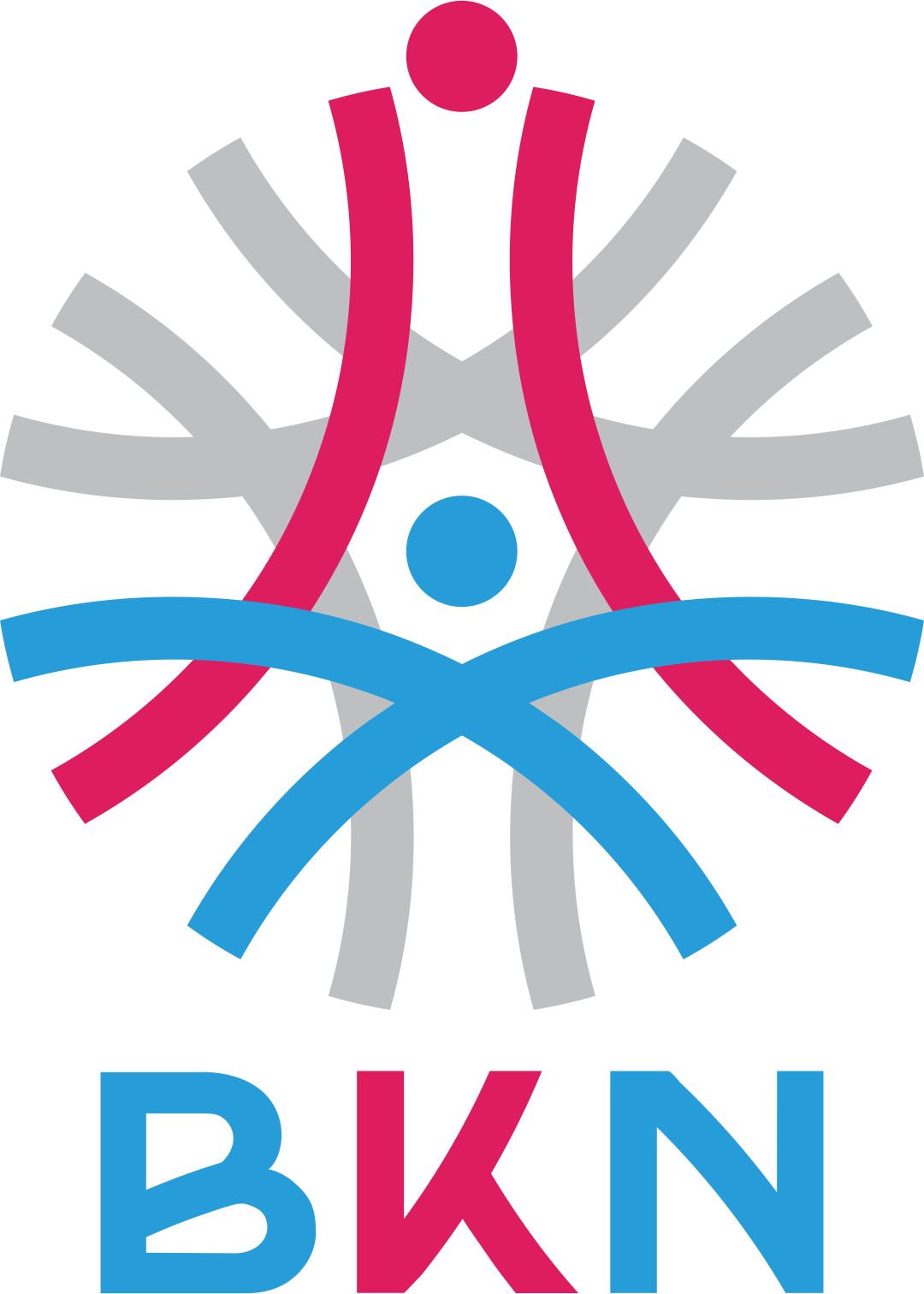
Logo of National Civil Service Agency (2023–sekarang)

== See also ==
- Australian Public Service, Australian equivalent
- Public Service of Canada, Canadian equivalent
- Dutch Senior Civil Service, Dutch equivalent
- Examination Yuan, Equivalent in the Republic of China (Taiwan)
- Civil Service, British equivalent
- United States Office of Personnel Management, United States equivalent
