= Julmansyah =

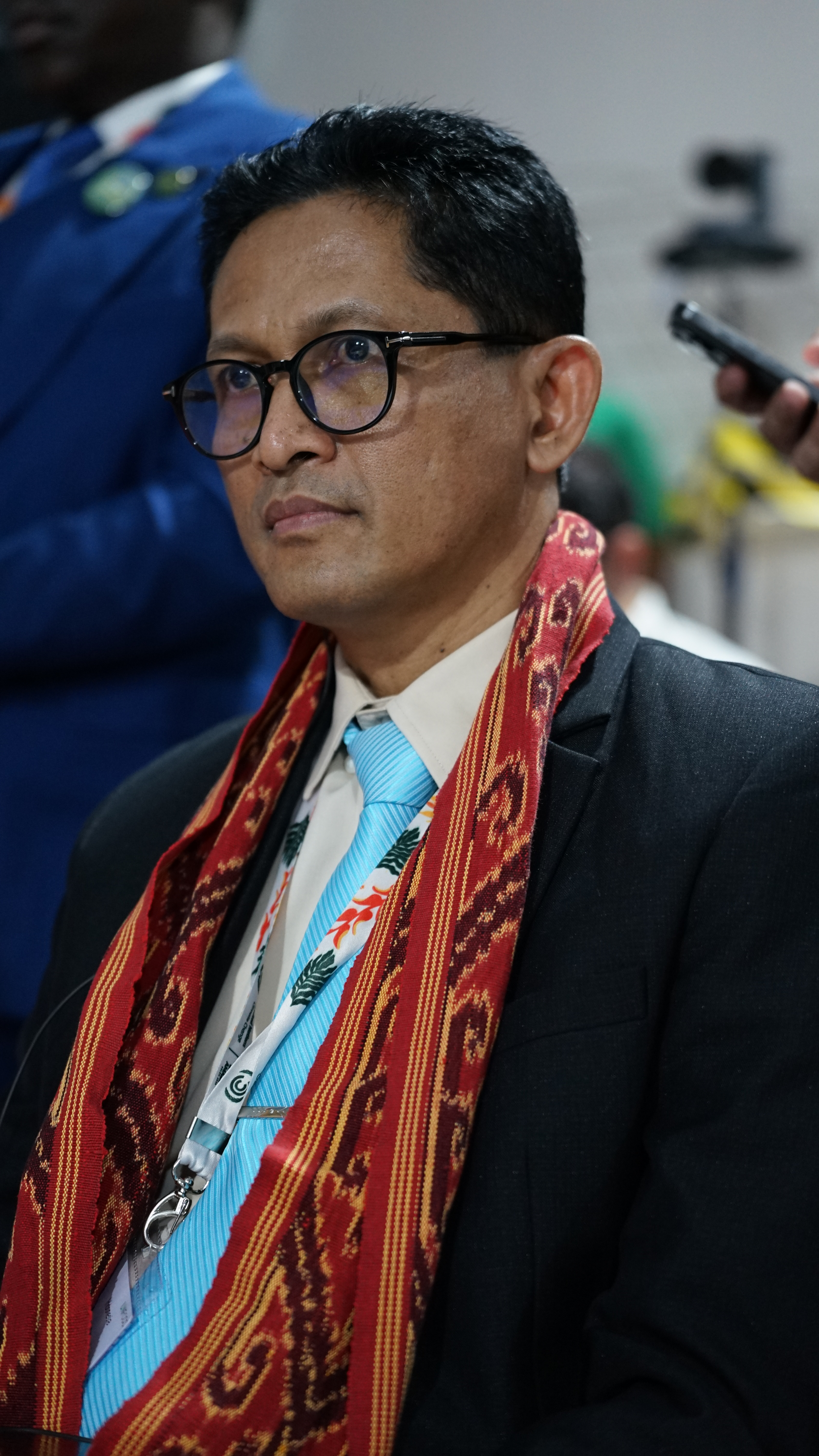

Regent of West Sumbawa
- Acting
- In office 24 September 2024 – 23 November 2024
- Governor: Hassanudin
- Preceded by: W. Musyafirin
- Succeeded by: W. Musyafirin

Personal details
- Born: July 1, 1974 (age 52) Sumbawa, West Nusa Tenggara, Indonesia
- Education: Institute of Agriculture, Yogyakarta (S.Hut.); Indonesia Open University (MAP)

Julmansyah (born 1 July 1974) is an Indonesian forester and bureaucrat who was the director responsible for handling tenurial conflict and managing tribal forests within Indonesia's forest ministry. Prior to his current assignment, Julmansyah worked in West Nusa Tenggara's environment and forest service, culminating in his appointment as the head of the service from 2022 to 2025. During his latter's tenure, Julmansyah was also appointed as the acting regent of West Sumbawa for two months in 2024 to temporarily replace the previous regent W. Musyafirin.

== Early life and education ==
Julmansyah was born on 1 July 1974 in Empang, a subdistrict of the Sumbawa Regency. He received his bachelor's degree in forestry from the Institute of Agriculture (Institut Pertanian, INTAN) in Yogyakarta in 1998. Upon graduating, he briefly worked in NGOs located in Mataram: the Institute of Economic and Social Research, Information, and Education, and the Konsepsi Mataram. He received his master's degree in public administration from the Indonesia Open University in 2015 with a thesis analyzing the exit strategy of two development programs in Sumbawa.

== Forestry career ==
Julmansyah entered Sumbawa's forest and plantation service in December 2002 with the civil service rank of III/a. He worked as a program manager at the service before being promoted as the head of the Puncak Ngengas Batulanteh forest sector in 2011, where in 2016 he led a joint team with the military and police to recover logs from trees that were illegally cut down. He was promoted to the civil service rank of IV/a in April 2016, and on December of the same year he was functionally reassigned to the West Nusa Tenggara provincial government.

In January 2018, Julmansyah was promoted to supervise the much wider Ampang Plampang forest area. He initiated a collaboration with the local Zakat House to encourage people to donate tree seedlings for forest restoration in the area and caught illegal logging syndicates in the act with the help of military personnels. A year later, in 2019 Julmansyah was reassigned to the West Nusa Tenggara provincial forest and environment service as head of the planology (urban and regional planning) section and head of forest management section, successively.

On 26 March 2021, Julmansyah was appointed to his first non-forest related position as head of the provincial library and archival services. Julmansyah led the agency during the COVID-19 pandemic, where the agency continued to operate with limited funding. The service launched several digital initiatives to promote literacy in the province through ease of access, such as digital library, mobile library, and a digital reading corner in the province's Islamic center. The province's literacy ranking also saw an increase from the 14th in 2020 to the 10th in 2021. However, Julmansyah emphasized that the lack of books caused literacy level to remain low in the province. Shortly before leaving office, in January 2022 Julmansyah announced the construction of a new provincial library.

Julmansyah returned to the provincial environment and forestry service to take office as its new head on 31 May 2022. Throughout his tenure, Julmansyah launched a number of initiatives focused on various sectors of the service, focusing on waste management, circular economy, environmental restoration, and community empowerment, which led to him receiving the award for green leadership from vice president Ma'ruf Amin in 2023.

In the midst of his tenure, on 24 September 2024 Julmansyah was inducted as the acting regent of West Sumbawa, replacing W. Musyafirin who resigned to take part in gubernatorial elections. During his brief two month provisional tenure, Julmansyah successfully secured cooperation between West Sumbawa and its parent regency, Sumbawa, to support West Sumbawa's mining economy, and presided over the establishment of the West Sumbawa History Information Gallery in collaboration with Pegadaian and collaborated with AMMAN to introduce surfing into school as a way to develop young surfing talent and strengthen community-based tourism. He stepped down from the position on 23 November 2024.

On 23 January 2025, Julmansyah was promoted into the forest ministry as director responsible for handling tenurial conflict and managing tribal forests within Indonesia's forest ministry.
