= Ferry Tinggogoy =

Indonesian politician and general (1944 – 2013)

Ferry Franciscus Xaverius Tinggogoy
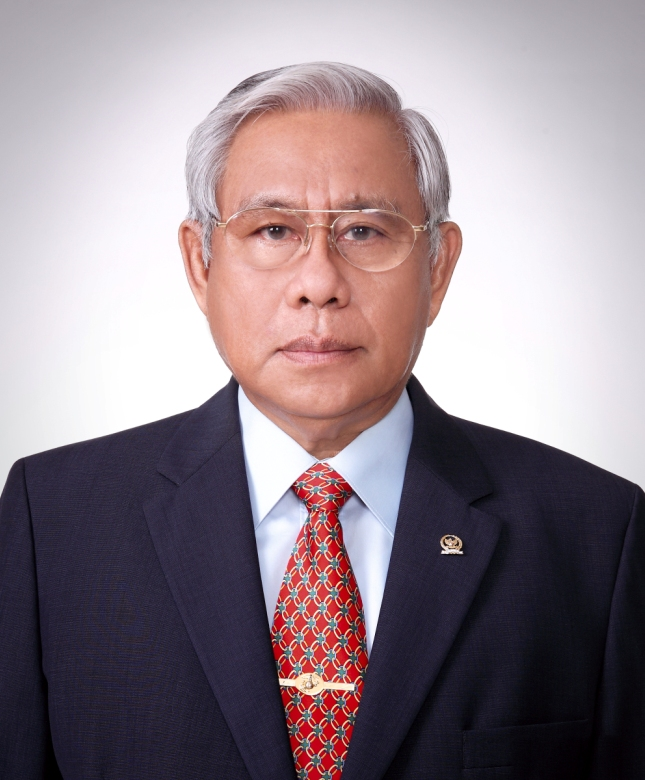
- Official portrait, 2010

Indonesian Senator from North Sulawesi
- In office 1 October 2009 – 25 October 2013
- President: Susilo Bambang Yudhoyono
- Succeeded by: Sientje Sondakh Mandey
- Constituency: North Sulawesi

Member of the People's Representative Council from North Sulawesi
- In office 7 November 1998 – 27 April 2001
- President: B. J. Habibie; Abdurrahman Wahid
- Succeeded by: Yahya Secawirya
- Constituency: North Sulawesi
- Majority: 124,323 (10,0%)

Personal details
- Born: Ferry Franciscus Xaverius Tinggogoy; December 29, 1944 North Bolaang Mongondow, North Sulawesi, Dutch East Indies
- Died: February 25, 2013 (aged 68) Gatot Soebroto Army Hospital, Jakarta, Indonesia
- Party: National Awakening Party
- Other political affiliations: Golkar (until 2004)
- Spouse: Lenny Helena Makalew
- Children: 3

Military service
- Allegiance: Indonesia
- Branch/service: Indonesian Army
- Years of service: 1966 — 2001
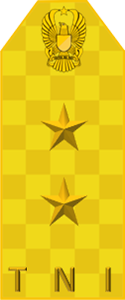
- Rank: Major General of the Army
- Unit: Infantry

Ferry Franciscu Xaverius Tinggogoy (29 December 1944 – 25 February 2013), more commonly referred to as Ferry Tinggogoy, was an Indonesian high-ranking major general and politician, who served as a member of the Regional Representative Council from the province of North Sulawesi, from 2009 until his death in 2013. Previously, he served in the People's Representative Council from 1998 until 2001, and the Army from 1966 until 2001.

Born during the Japanese occupation of Indonesia, Tinggogoy attended primary and secondary education in Bitung, before enrolling at the National Military Academy in Magelang, graduating in 1968. He began his military service at the XIV/Hasanuddin Regional Military Command, and later attended and graduated to the Singapore Command and Staff College (SCSC), becoming the first non-Singaporean to attend. He returned to Indonesia in 1984, and became a battalion commander until 1986, when he served at ABRI Headquarters for a year. He was then transferred to France as a Defense Attaché in 1988, but left the position in 1991, to assume the position of Deputy Commander of the Military Liaison Officers Unit in the United Nations Preliminary Mission in Cambodia. In 1995, he was appointed Head of the Defense and Security Department's Language Center. He was promoted again in 1997, as an Expert Staff Coordinator of the Army Chief of Staff.

In November 1998, Tinggogoy was appointed as a member of the People's Representative Council (DPR), as a member of the DPR from the Military/Police faction. During his two-year tenure, he was involved in dealing with a number of conflicts such as the Aceh and East Timor conflicts. He resigned from the DPR due to his opposition to the impeachment of Abdurrahman Wahid. He also retired from the military a short time later. Following his removal from the DPR and his retirement from the military, he joined the National Awakening Party (PKB), and was appointed as Chairman of the Regional Executive Board of the North Sulawesi branch of the party. His appointment marked the party's first efforts to open up the party to non-Muslims.

In 2004, Tinggogoy ran for a seat in DPR, but lost the election. During the campaign, he expressed his support for the Wiranto and Salahuddin Wahid ticket during the first round of the 2004 Indonesian presidential election, but following his election loss, he shifted his support to the Susilo Bambang Yudhoyono and Jusuf Kalla ticket in the second round of the election. In 2009, he ran for a seat in the Regional Representative Council, and was elected with 124,323 votes. As a senator, he was involved in the Ahmad Farhan Hamid controversy.

== Death ==
Tinggogoy started dialysis since September 2012 and died on 25 February 2013, at the Gatot Soebroto Army Hospital.

His body was laid to rest at the Nusantara Building on 27 February, and was buried in the Kalibata Heroes' Cemetery on the same day.
