= Titi Memet Tanumidjaja =

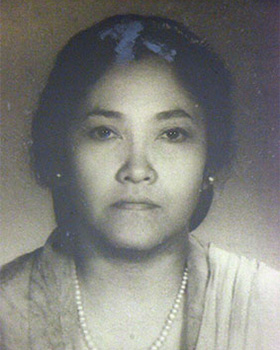
- Titi circa 1952

Regional Director of UNICEF for East Asia and Pakistan
- In office 1981–1983
- Preceded by: Roberto Esquerra-Barry
- Succeeded by: Ahmed Mostefaoui

Member of Mutual Assistance House of Representatives
- In office 25 June 1960 – 3 November 1965
- President: Sukarno
- Succeeded by: Sri Rochmani Lasmindar

Chairwoman of Bhayangkari
- In office 19 Oktober 1952 – April 1954
- Preceded by: None
- Succeeded by: Soeyono Prawiro Bismo

Personal details
- Born: 25 April 1920 Karangan, Trenggalek, Dutch East Indies
- Died: 11 August 1998 (aged 78)
- Spouse: Memet Tanumidjaja
- Profession: Politician

Titi Memet Tanumidjaja (25 April 1920 – 11 August 1998), also written as Titi Memed Tanumidjaja, was an Indonesian women's rights activist and politician who served as a member of the Mutual Assistance House of Representatives from 25 June 1960 to 3 November 1965.

== Early life ==
Titi was born in Karangan, Trenggalek Regency, on 25 April 1920, with a birth name Raden Ajeng Roro Sutiksmowati. Her father was Raden Sutikno, and her mother was R.A. Sukesi.

== Career and organizational experiences ==
In the 1950s, Titi worked at the Ministry of Social Affairs. While working there, she served as an inspector of social affairs for West Java.

Titi was one of the founders of the organization of police wives, Bhayangkari, along with H.L. Soekanto and Mrs. Suwito. After Bhayangkari was established on 17 August 1949, Soekanto Tjokrodiatmodjo appointed Titi as the Chairwoman of the Bhayangkari Central Executive Board. She was re-elected as the Chairwoman of Bhayangkari on 19 October 1952, through a police wives’ conference that she led. She resigned from her position as Chairwoman of Bhayangkari in April 1954 and was succeeded by Soeyono Prawiro Bismo.

Titi was also involved in the women's movement. She served as an assistant to the organizing committee for the Seventh Women's Congress, held in Jakarta from 24 to 28 November 1950. Later, at the Ninth Indonesian Women's Congress in Bandung from 22 to 25 December 1952, Titi was appointed Head of the Secretariat of the Indonesian Women's Congress for the economic affairs division. She and the other four Indonesian Women's Congress delegates also attended the UNESCO Seminar on the Status of Women in South Asia, held in New Delhi from 29 December 1952 to 7 January 1953, representing Bhayangkari. In 1953, she became one of the pioneers of the Women's Cooperative Bank. As a member of parliament, she also chaired the Twelfth Indonesian Women's Congress, held in Jakarta in February 1961.

On 25 June 1960, Titi was appointed as a member of the Mutual Assistance House of Representatives (DPR-GR) as a representative of the women's functional group and joined Commission B, responsible for Welfare. In 1961, the DPR-GR leadership reorganized its parliamentary commissions, and Titi was transferred to Commission G, responsible for Social Welfare. Within that commission, she became the chairwoman and also served as a member of the DPR-GR's household committee. She resigned from the Mutual Assistance House of Representatives on 3 November 1965, as she accompanied her husband, who was appointed ambassador to Czechoslovakia. Her position was succeeded by Sri Rochmani Lasmindar.

After serving as a member of parliament, Titi returned to work at the Ministry of Social Affairs until 1974. She also engaged in a joint venture poultry operations with Dutch companies Kemper BV, Richard Vanseemus BV, and Jogersveld BV in Cicurug in January 1974. In addition, she was one of the founders of a fashion enthusiasts’ organization, Himpunan Ratna Busana, in 1972.

Titi later joined UNICEF as an adviser for family welfare. In 1978, she was appointed as the Head of the UNICEF Representative Office in Pakistan and held that position until 1981. From 1981 to 1983, she served as UNICEF's Regional Director for East Asia and Pakistan.

== Death and personal life ==
Titi died on 11 August 1998. She was buried in Ngadirogo, Podorejo, Sumbergempol, Tulungagung. She had previously expressed her wish to be buried in Tulungagung rather than at the Kalibata Heroes Cemetery. In 2018, her grave was restored and inaugurated by Tito Karnavian’s wife, Tri Tito Karnavian.

Titi married Memed Tanumidjaja.

== Bibliographies ==
- Almanak lembaga-lembaga negara dan kepartaian. Jakarta: Departemen Penerangan. 1961.
- Huda, M. Dimyati (2020). Rethinking Peran Permuan Dan Keadilan Gender: Sebuah Konstruksi Metodologis Berbasis Sejarah dan Perkembangan Sosial Budaya. Bandung: CV Cendikia Press.
