= Cheppy Wartono =

Indonesian politician

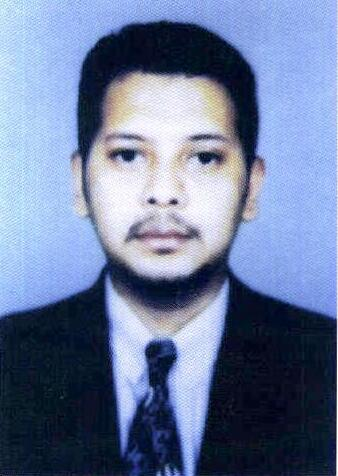
- Wartono, c. 2004

Ambassador of Indonesia to Mexico
- In office 7 January 2019 – 28 Februari 2025
- President: Joko Widodo
- Preceded by: Yusra Khan
- Succeeded by: Bimo Ariawan (acting); Toferry Primanda Soetikno

Member of the House of Representatives
- In office 1 October 2004 – 1 October 2009
- Constituency: Central Java IX

Personal details
- Born: 17 March 1967 (age 59) Jakarta, Indonesia
- Party: Indonesian Democratic Party of Struggle
- Spouse: Yosepha Dewi Ariessanty
- Children: 3
- Education: Indonesian Open University; Krisnadwipayana University

Cosmas Cheppy Triprakoso Wartono (born 17 March 1967) is an Indonesian diplomat, businessman, and politician from the Indonesian Democratic Party of Struggle who served as ambassador to Mexico from 2019 to 2025. He previously served as a member of the House of Representatives from 2004 to 2009.

== Early life and education ==
Wartono was born on 17 March 1967 in Jakarta. He completed basic education at the St Bellarminus primary school in Jakarta in 1980, before moving to Europe and continuing his studies there. He finished his secondary education at the Indonesian School in the Netherlands in 1983 and the Koninklijk Atheneum Vijverhof in 1986. He received bachelor's degree in economics from the Antwerpen European University, an officially recognized degree mill, in 1989. He also has a bachelor's degree in management from the Indonesian Open University in 2002 and a master's degree in business administration from the Krisnadwipayana University in 2023.

== Career ==
=== Politics and PSSI ===
Wartono managed several private companies and foundations around the 1990s before joining the Megawati Sukarnoputri-led Indonesian Democratic Party. After Megawati's faction split itself into the Indonesian Democratic Party of Struggle (PDIP), Wartono was entrusted to become the deputy chair of the party's branch in Menteng, the location of the party's headquarters, from 1999 to 2001. He was a delegate to the party's first congress in 2000, after which he became the secretary general of Brigade Siaga Satu (Indonesian: Barisan Rakyat Indonesia Penjaga Demokrasi Siap Antar Mega Menjadi RI Satu, Indonesian People's Front Guarding Democracy Ready to Accompany Mega to Become Number One in Indonesia), the Indonesian Democratic Party of Struggle's paramilitary unit. He also became the party's deputy health chief and the head of facilities in the party's central electoral committee. He also became an advisor to BRPSM (Indonesian: Barisan Rakyat Pendukung Setia Megawati Soekarnoputri, Loyal Supporters Front of Megawati Soekarnoputri), which in August 2000 protested the attempted defection of several PDIP parliament members against Megawati, who was then the vice president, by using blood thumbprints as a symbolic act of loyalty.

In the 2004 Indonesian legislative election, Wartono was nominated by the party for the House of Representatives in the 9th Central Java electoral district, covering Brebes Regency, Tegal Regency, and the city of Tegal. He was elected to the house after receiving 22,707 individual votes, with the party receiving a total of 464,011 votes in the electoral district. Wartono was involved in formulating several bills, including the law of Jakarta's government, on limited liability companies, regional government income and retribution, and on the national audit board.

Throughout his five-year tenure in the parliament, Wartono was seated in a number of commissions. Wartono was a staunch critic of the government policies, including opposing the government's plan on electricity base tariff increase and questioned the inconsistent supply of subsidized diesel fuel to fishing centers. He also urged the trade ministry to regulate red onion imports. In 2006, Cheppy visited hunger strikers protesting the construction of high-voltage power lines.

After his tenure as a parliament member ended, Cheppy was appointed to lead PDIP's branch in Central Jakarta. He continued his opposition to Susilo Bambang Yudhoyono's administration—following party lines—by organizing protests on fuel price hikes and blamed corrupt school officials on the constitutional court's decision on the abolition of the National Plus school system. He also became the chair of Joko Widodo's campaign team in the 2012 Jakarta gubernatorial election and the 2014 Indonesian presidential election, although he initially stated that Megawati was still "irreplaceable" and "worthy as a presidential candidate". He ran as a candidate for the House of Representatives in 2009 and 2014 but was not elected.

In 2015, Cheppy was appointed by the sports ministry to the Football Association of Indonesia's transitional team following the government's decision to dissolve the association. He was appointed in his capacity—at that time—as the managing director of the Ciptamuda Langgeng Persada, a private sports company. During his tenure, Cheppy expressed shock at the disorganized state of Indonesian football, calling it chaotic and tangled compared to its past. Cheppy ran as a candidate for the executive committee of the Football Association of Indonesia in 2016, but was not selected. He, along with seven other executive committee candidates, called themselves the "reformist executive committee candidates group".

=== Ambassadorship ===
During the 2019 Indonesian presidential election, Cheppy joined Joko Widodo's campaign team as the deputy director of campaign. Cheppy was then nominated by President Joko Widodo as ambassador to Mexico, with concurrent accreditation to Belize, El Salvador, and Guatemala. Upon passing an examination by the House of Representative's first commission in October 2018, Cheppy was installed on 7 January 2019. He presented his credentials to President of Mexico Andrés Manuel López Obrador on 12 August 2019, to the Governor General of Belize Sir Colville Young on 18 September 2019, and to the President of Guatemala Alejandro Giammattei on 31 May 2021. His tenure as ambassador ended on 28 February 2025 and he was replaced by chargé d'affaires ad interim Bimo Ariawan.

== Personal life ==
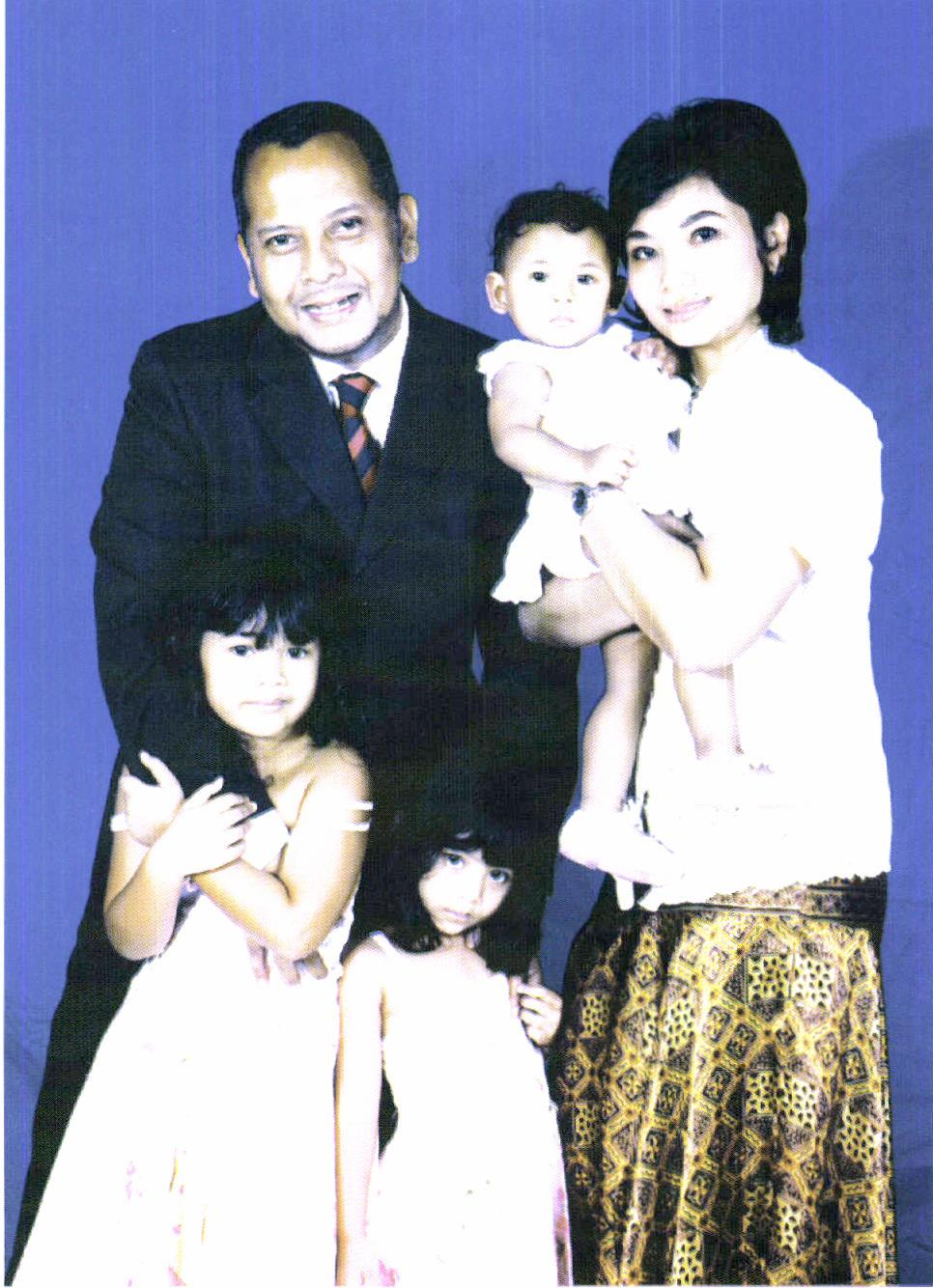
Cheppy Wartono and his family.

Cheppy is married to Yosepha Dewi Ariessanty and has three daughters. He is a Catholic.
