= Dutch Senior Civil Service =

- Algemene Bestuursdienst

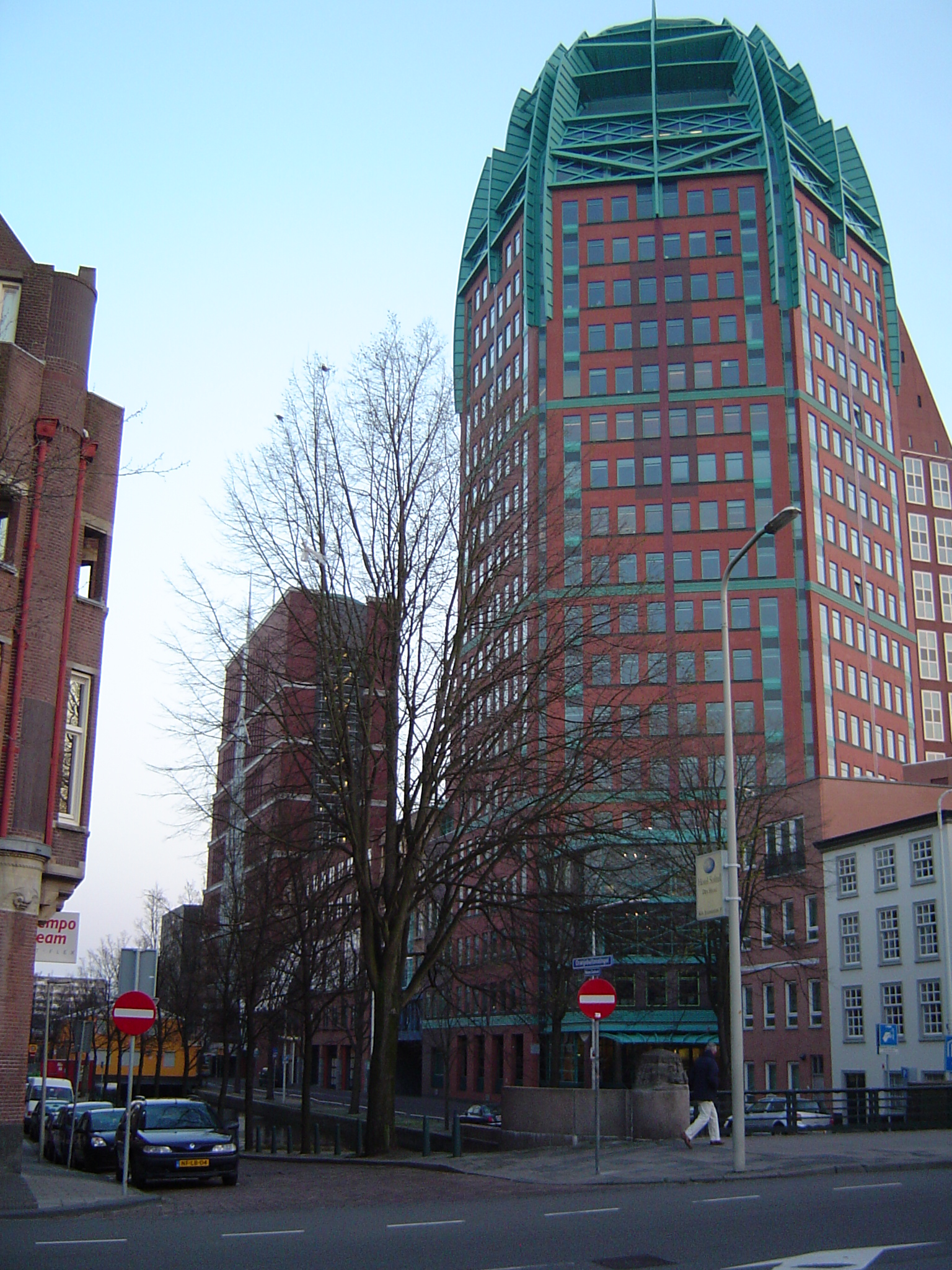

Service overview
- Formed: 19 June 1995; 29 years ago
- Headquarters: Zurich Tower in The Hague; 52°04′50″N 04°19′15″E
- Employees: 1,872
- Service executive: Bram de Klerck, DG
- Parent department: Ministry of the Interior and Kingdom Relations
- Website: www.algemenebestuursdienst.nl

The Dutch Senior Civil Service (Dutch: Algemene Bestuursdienst, ABD; lit. 'General Administrative Service') comprises the top civil servants of the government of the Netherlands. The managers at director level and above from all ministries are part of the ABD. These include, for example, the secretaries-general (SG), the directors-general (DG), the inspectors-general (IG), and all directors with "integral final responsibility" for people and resources.

The ABD Office (Dutch: Bureau ABD) is responsible for the recruitment and selection for managerial positions and for the development of managers and their mutual cooperation. The ABD Office offers development programs to talent within the government and is the point of contact for managers from outside the government who are considering a career within the government service.

== Top Management Group ==
Since 2000, the Top Management Group (Dutch: Topmanagementgroep, TMG) is further distinguished from the civil servants who make up the Dutch Senior Civil Service. This group includes the secretaries-general, directors-general, inspectors-general, the treasurer-general, the director of the Bureau for Economic Policy Analysis, the director of the Netherlands Institute for Social Research, the director of the Netherlands Environmental Assessment Agency, the National Coordinator for Security and Counterterrorism, and the consultants of ABDTOPConsult. Special rules apply to these most senior civil servants of the Dutch government, so they are appointed for a maximum term of seven years.

== See also ==
- Civil service
- Politics of the Netherlands
- Italian Senior Civil Service
