= Sugianto Sabran =

Indonesian politician (born 1973)

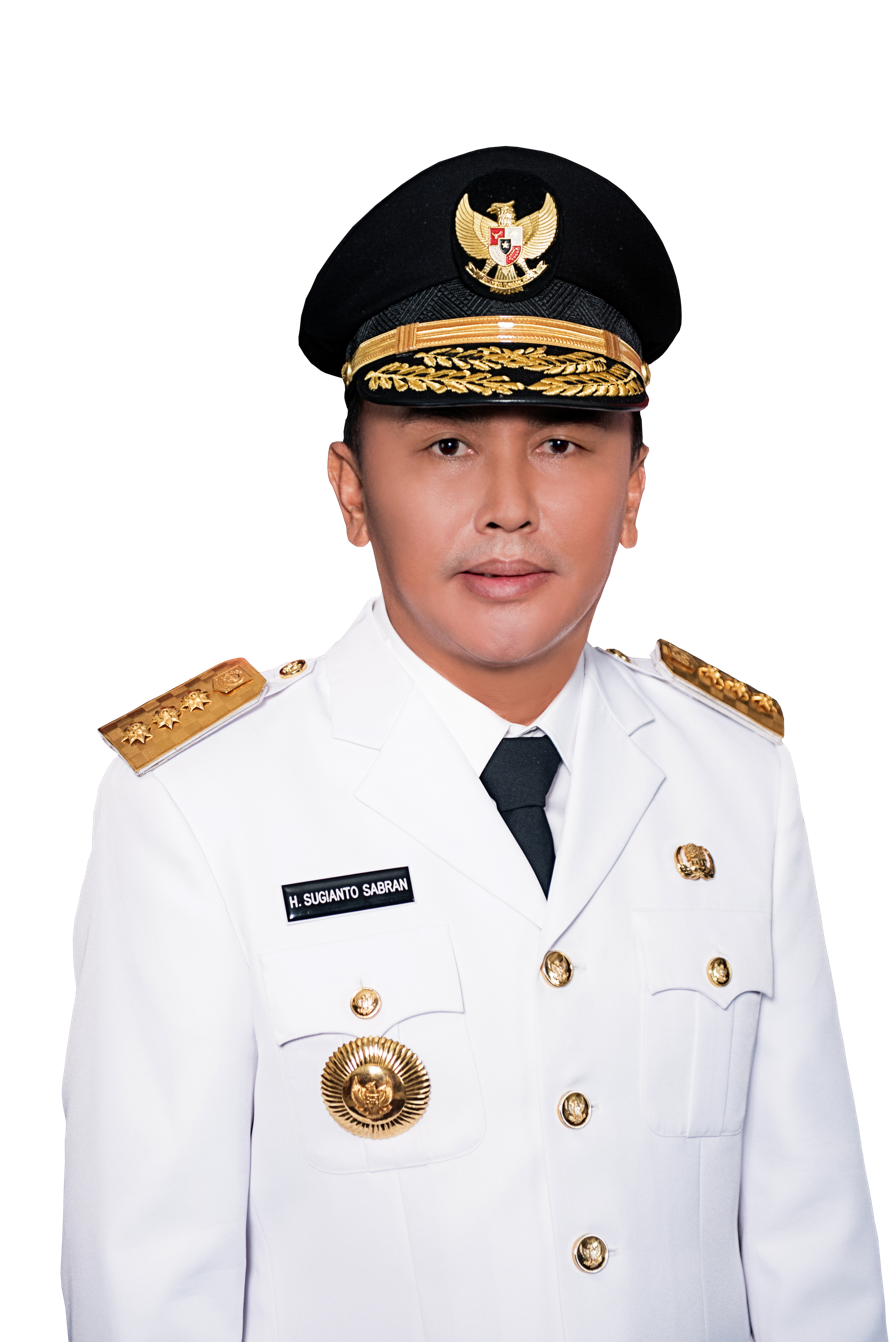

Governor of Central Kalimantan
- In office 25 May 2016 – 20 February 2025
- Deputy: Habib Said Ismail (2016–2021); Edy Pratowo (2021–2025)
- Preceded by: Hadi Prabowo
- Succeeded by: Agustiar Sabran

Personal details
- Born: 5 July 1973 (age 52) Sampit, Indonesia
- Citizenship: Indonesian
- Party: Indonesian Democratic Party of Struggle (PDI-P)
- Spouse(s): Ussy Sulistiawaty (m. 2003; div. 2006) Yulistra Ivo Azhari (m. 2018)
- Children: 2

Sugianto Sabran is an Indonesian politician and the former governor of Central Kalimantan. As governor, Sabran has been a proponent of the Indonesian future capital proposal per the first President Sukarno's idea of shifting the national capital to Palangka Raya. He's also supported initiatives for food security in the province.
