= List of Indonesian ambassadors =

Swearing in ceremony of Indonesian ambassadors on 13 February 2019.

Ambassadors of Indonesia are persons nominated by the president to serve as the representative of the country in foreign nations. According to Article 13 of the amended 1945 Constitution of the Republic of Indonesia, the President appoints ambassadors and consuls. However, this power is not a full prerogative of the president, as the president must take into account the consideration of the House of Representatives when appointing ambassadors.

The House of Representative's first commission, which oversees foreign affairs, handles the review process. This process, often referred to as a fit and proper test, involves a hearing where ambassadorial candidates present their plan. The commission assesses the candidates based on several criteria, including their diplomatic skills, foreign language proficiency, educational background, professional experience, and personal integrity. The results of this deliberation are confidential and submitted to the president. While the House of Representatives consideration is not legally binding on the president, it has become a constitutional convention that the president respects. Following this, the president formally submits the selected candidate's name to the receiving country for agrément before the ambassador is installed and can begin their duties.

Indonesian ambassadors serve as both the nation's and the president's personal representative to a host country. Their primary function is to conduct foreign relations and implement Indonesia's foreign policy. This includes engaging in proactive diplomacy to advance national interests in various sectors, such as politics, economy, social affairs, and culture. A key responssändebudibility is to build a positive image of Indonesia on the international stage and strengthen bilateral relations. Ambassadors are also responsible for protecting the rights and interests of Indonesian citizens and entities abroad. This includes providing consular services, offering assistance to Indonesians in need, and working to resolve legal or humanitarian issues that may arise. As the head of a diplomatic mission, an ambassador oversees all staff and operations, ensuring the embassy functions effectively as a hub for Indonesian diplomacy and a point of contact for the host nation.

Ambassadors are appointed from two different groups, career ambassadors (career diplomat – CD), who had prior service in the Ministry of Foreign Affairs and had attended several diplomatic service educations, and non-career ambassadors (political appointee – PA), who are appointed from outside the traditional diplomatic corps, including academics, artists, former military officers, and politicians. Ambassadors have no fixed term but usually served about 3 to 5 years.

== Current Indonesian ambassadors ==
Indonesia maintains diplomatic relations with all United Nations (UN) member states except Israel. Indonesia also has diplomatic relations with UN observers the Holy See and the State of Palestine, as well as two associated states: Cook Islands and Niue.

Host country	Ambassador	Background	Confirmed	Credentials	Website	List	Ref.
Afghanistan	vacant since 2021	N/A	N/A	N/A	Kabul		
Albania (Note: One ambassador, resident in Sofia, is accredited to Albania, Bulgaria, and North Macedonia.)	Listiana Operananta	CD	24 March 2025	26 November 2025	Sofia		
Algeria	Yusron Bahauddin Ambary	CD	19 December 2025	31 August 2026	Algiers		
Andorra (Note: One ambassador, resident in Paris, is accredited to Andorra, France, Monaco, and UNESCO.)	Mohamad Oemar	CD	25 October 2021	1 April 2022	Paris		
Angola (Note: One ambassador, resident in Windhoek, is accredited to Angola and Namibia.)	Mirza Nurhidayat	CD	24 March 2025	20 October 2025	Windhoek		
Antigua and Barbuda (Note: One ambassador, resident in Bogotá, is accredited to Antigua and Barbuda, Barbados, Colombia, and Saint Kitts and Nevis.)	Azis Nurwahyudi	CD	pending	pending	Bogotá		
Argentina (Note: One ambassador, resident in Buenos Aires, is accredited to Argentina, Paraguay, and Uruguay.)	Sulaiman Syarif	CD	25 October 2023	15 May 2024	Buenos Aires		
Armenia (Note: One ambassador, resident in Kyiv, is accredited to Armenia, Georgia, and Ukraine.)	Arief Muhammad Basalamah	CD	26 June 2023	14 November 2023	Kyiv		
Australia (Note: One ambassador, resident in Canberra, is accredited to Australia and Vanuatu.)	Siswo Pramono	CD	25 October 2021	8 December 2021	Canberra	List	
Austria (Note: One ambassador, resident in Vienna, is accredited to Austria, Slovenia, CTBTO, IACA, IAEA, OPEC, OPEC Fund, UNIDO, UNODC and UNOV.)	Damos Dumoli Agusman	CD	17 November 2021	15 March 2022	Vienna	List	
Azerbaijan	Berlian Helmy	CD	8 October 2025	30 January 2026	Baku		
Bahamas (Note: One ambassador, resident in Havana, is accredited to Bahamas, Cuba, Dominican Republic, Haiti, and Jamaica.)	Simon Soekarno	CD	24 March 2025	16 October 2025	Havana		
Bahrain	Wahyuni Refi Satya Bekti	PA	pending	pending	Manama	List	
Bangladesh (Note: One ambassador, resident in Dhaka, is accredited to Bangladesh and Nepal.)	Listyowati	CD	8 October 2025	23 January 2026	Dhaka		
Barbados	Azis Nurwahyudi	CD	pending	pending	Bogotá		
Belarus (Note: One ambassador, resident in Moscow, is accredited to Belarus and Russia.)	Jose Antonio Morato Tavares	CD	26 October 2020	30 September 2021	Moscow		
Belgium (Note: One ambassador, resident in Brussels, is accredited to Belgium, Luxembourg, EU, and WCO.)	Andy Rachmianto	CD	8 October 2025	1 April 2026	Brussels		
Belize (Note: One ambassador, resident in Mexico City, is accredited to Belize, El Salvador, Guatemala, and Mexico.)	Toferry Primanda Soetikno	CD	25 August 2025	23 July 2026	Mexico City		
Benin (Note: One ambassador, resident in Abuja, is accredited to Benin, Burkina Faso, Ghana, Liberia, Niger, Nigeria, São Tomé and Príncipe, Togo, and ECOWAS.)	Bambang Suharto	CD	24 March 2025	pending	Abuja		
Bhutan (Note: One ambassador, resident in New Delhi, is accredited to Bhutan and India.)	Desra Percaya	CD	pending	pending	New Delhi		
Bolivia (Note: One ambassador, resident in Lima, is accredited to Bolivia and Peru.)	Epiphania Riris Wusananingdyah	CD	pending	pending	Lima		
Bosnia and Herzegovina	Manahan Sitompul	PA	24 March 2025	4 July 2025	Sarajevo		
Botswana (Note: One ambassador, resident in Pretoria, is accredited to Botswana, Lesotho, South Africa, Eswatini, and SADC.)	Ayodhia Kalake	CD	pending	pending	Pretoria		
Brazil	Andhika Chrisnayudhanto	CD	25 August 2025	3 February 2026	Brasilia		
Brunei	Achmad Ubaedillah	PA	26 June 2023	13 September 2023	Bandar Seri Begawan		
Bulgaria	Listiana Operananta	CD	24 March 2025	16 October 2025	Sofia		
Burkina Faso	Bambang Suharto	CD	24 March 2025	26 June 2026	Abuja		
Burundi (Note: One ambassador, resident in Dar es Salaam, is accredited to Burundi, Rwanda, and Tanzania.)	Albert Abdi	CD	pending	pending	Dar es Salaam		
Cambodia	Achsanul Habib	CD	pending	pending	Phnom Penh		
Cameroon (Note: One ambassador, resident in Yaoundé, is accredited to Cameroon, Central African Republic, Chad, Equatorial Guinea, Republic of Congo, and Gabon.)	Agung Cahaya Sumirat	CD	24 March 2025	pending	Yaounde		
Canada (Note: One ambassador, resident in Ottawa, is accredited to Canada and ICAO.)	Muhsin Syihab	CD	24 March 2025	15 September 2025	Ottawa		
Cape Verde (Note: One ambassador, resident in Dakar, is accredited to Cape Verde, Gambia, Guinea, Guinea-Bissau, Mali, Ivory Coast, Senegal, and Sierra Leone.)	Ardian Wicaksono	CD	24 March 2025	25 February 2026	Dakar		
Central African Republic	Agung Cahaya Sumirat	CD	24 March 2025	17 July 2026	Yaounde		
Chad	Agung Cahaya Sumirat	CD	24 March 2025	pending	Yaounde		
Chile	Vedi Kurnia Buana	CD	24 March 2025	13 August 2025	Santiago		
China (Note: One ambassador, resident in Beijing, is accredited to China and Mongolia.)	Irawan Ronodipuro	PA	pending	pending	Beijing		
Colombia	Azis Nurwahyudi	CD	pending	pending	Bogotá		
Comoros (Note: One chargé d'affaires en pied, resident in Antananarivo, is accredited to Comoros, Madagascar, Mauritius, and Seychelles.)	Lanang Seputro	CD	5 February 2024	25 April 2024	Antananarivo		
Democratic Republic of Congo (Note: One ambassador, resident in Nairobi, is accredited to Democratic Republic of Congo, Kenya, Somalia, South Sudan, Uganda, UNEP, and UN-HABITAT.)	Witjaksono Adji	CD	24 March 2025	10 November 2025	Nairobi		
Republic of Congo	Agung Cahaya Sumirat	CD	24 March 2025	pending	Yaounde		
Cook Islands (Note: One ambassador, resident in Wellington, is accredited to New Zealand, Cook Islands, Niue, Samoa, and Tonga.)	Dindin Wahyudin	CD	pending	pending	Wellington		
Costa Rica (Note: One ambassador, resident in Panama City, is accredited to Costa Rica, Honduras, Nicaragua, and Panama.)	Hendra Halim	CD	24 March 2025	17 October 2025	Panama City		
Croatia	Yulastiawarman	CD	pending	pending	Zagreb		
Cuba	Simon Soekarno	CD	24 March 2025	23 September 2025	Havana		
Cyprus (Note: One ambassador, resident in Rome, is accredited to Cyprus, Italy, Malta, San Marino, FAO, IFAD, UNIDROIT, and WFP.)	Junimart Girsang	PA	24 March 2025	10 February 2026	Rome		
Czech Republic	Rina Soemarno	CD	24 March 2025	1 July 2025	Prague		
Denmark (Note: One ambassador, resident in Copenhagen, is accredited to Denmark and Lithuania.)	Siti Nugraha Mauludiah	CD	24 March 2025	9 September 2025	Copenhagen		
Djibouti (Note: One ambassador, resident in Addis Ababa, is accredited to Djibouti, Eritrea, Ethiopia, and AU.)	Faizal Chery Sidharta	CD	24 March 2025	15 December 2025	Addis Ababa		
Dominica (Note: One ambassador, resident in Caracas, is accredited to Dominica, Grenada, Saint Lucia, Saint Vincent and the Grenadines, and Trinidad and Tobago.)	Fikry Cassidy	CD	24 March 2025	10 November 2025	Caracas		
Dominican Republic	Simon Soekarno	CD	24 March 2025	19 August 2026	Havana		
Ecuador	Imam As'ari	CD	25 August 2025	26 January 2026	Quito		
Egypt	Kuncoro Giri Waseso	CD	8 October 2025	1 July 2026	Cairo	List	
El Salvador	Toferry Primanda Soetikno	CD	25 August 2025	pending	Mexico City		
Equatorial Guinea	Agung Cahaya Sumirat	CD	24 March 2025	18 June 2026	Yaounde		
Eritrea	Faizal Chery Sidharta	CD	24 March 2025	pending	Addis Ababa		
Estonia (Note: One ambassador, resident in Helsinki, is accredited to Estonia and Finland.)	Ibnu Wahyutomo	CD	24 March 2025	26 November 2025	Helsinki		
Eswatini	Ayodhia Kalake	CD	pending	pending	Pretoria		
Ethiopia	Faizal Chery Sidharta	CD	24 March 2025	14 October 2025	Addis Ababa		
Fiji (Note: One ambassador, resident in Suva, is accredited to Fiji, Kiribati, Nauru, and Tuvalu.)	Dupito Simamora	CD	26 June 2023	22 August 2023	Suva		
Finland	Ibnu Wahyutomo	CD	24 March 2025	28 August 2025	Helsinki		
France	Mohamad Oemar	CD	25 October 2021	22 July 2022	Paris		
Gabon	Agung Cahaya Sumirat	CD	24 March 2025	17 March 2026	Yaounde		
Gambia	Ardian Wicaksono	CD	24 March 2025	pending	Dakar		
Georgia	Arief Muhammad Basalamah	CD	26 June 2023	20 December 2023	Kyiv		
Germany	Abdul Kadir Jailani	CD	25 August 2025	19 December 2025	Berlin		
Ghana	Bambang Suharto	CD	24 March 2025	15 June 2026	Abuja		
Greece	Heru Hartanto Subolo	CD	pending	pending	Athens		
Grenada	Fikry Cassidy	CD	24 March 2025	21 April 2026	Caracas		
Guatemala	Toferry Primanda Soetikno	CD	25 August 2025	7 September 2026	Mexico City		
Guinea	Ardian Wicaksono	CD	24 March 2025	10 October 2025	Dakar		
Guinea-Bissau	Ardian Wicaksono	CD	24 March 2025	22 October 2025	Dakar		
Guyana (Note: One ambassador, resident in Paramaribo, is accredited to Guyana, Suriname, and CARICOM.)	Agus Priono	CD	24 March 2025	18 November 2025	Paramaribo		
Haiti	Simon Soekarno	CD	24 March 2025	pending	Havana		
Holy See	Michael Trias Kuncahyono	PA	26 June 2023	11 December 2023	Vatican		
Honduras	Hendra Halim	CD	24 March 2025	21 October 2025	Panama City		
Hungary	Penny Dewi Herasati	CD	24 March 2025	23 September 2025	Budapest		
Iceland (Note: One ambassador, resident in Oslo, is accredited to Iceland and Norway.)	Teuku Faizasyah	CD	26 June 2023	17 October 2023	Oslo		
India	Desra Percaya	CD	pending	pending	New Delhi		
Iran (Note: One ambassador, resident in Tehran, is accredited to Iran and Turkmenistan.)	Zaim Al Khalis Nasution	CD	pending	pending	Tehran		
Iraq	Didik Eko Pujianto	CD	24 March 2025	17 September 2025	Baghdad		
Ireland (Note: One ambassador, resident in London, is accredited to Ireland, United Kingdom, and IMO.)	Baringin Panggabean	PA	pending	pending	London		
Italy	Junimart Girsang	PA	24 March 2025	17 July 2025	Rome		
Ivory Coast	Ardian Wicaksono	CD	24 March 2025	pending	Dakar		
Jamaica	Simon Soekarno	CD	24 March 2025	3 September 2026	Havana		
Japan (Note: One ambassador, resident in Tokyo, is accredited to Japan and Micronesia.)	Nurmala Kartini Sjahrir	PA	19 December 2025	18 August 2026	Tokyo		
Jordan (Note: One ambassador, resident in Amman, is accredited to Jordan and Palestine.)	Iwan Freddy Hari Susanto	CD	pending	pending	Amman		
Kazakhstan (Note: One ambassador, resident in Astana, is accredited to Kazakhstan and Tajikistan.)	Bagus Hendraning Kobarsyih	CD	pending	pending	Astana		
Kenya	Witjaksono Adji	CD	24 March 2025	3 September 2025	Nairobi		
Kiribati	Dupito Simamora	CD	26 June 2023	N/A	Suva		
Kuwait	Winanto Adi	CD	pending	pending	Kuwait City		
Kyrgyzstan (Note: One ambassador, resident in Tashkent, is accredited to Kyrgyzstan and Uzbekistan.)	Siti Ruhaini Dzuhayatin	PA	24 March 2025	21 April 2026	Tashkent		
Laos	Dewi Justicia Meidiwaty	CD	pending	pending	Vientiane		
Latvia (Note: One ambassador, resident in Stockholm, is accredited to Latvia and Sweden.)	Yayan Ganda Hayat Mulyana	CD	24 March 2025	18 December 2025	Stockholm		
Lebanon	Dicky Komar	CD	24 March 2025	1 July 2025	Beirut		
Lesotho	Ayodhia Kalake	CD	pending	pending	Pretoria		
Liberia	Bambang Suharto	CD	24 March 2025	18 February 2026	Abuja		
Libya	vacant since 2019	N/A	N/A	N/A	Tripoli		
Liechtenstein (Note: One ambassador, resident in Bern, is accredited to Liechtenstein and Switzerland.)	I Gede Ngurah Swajaya	CD	26 June 2023	30 October 2023	Bern		
Lithuania	Siti Nugraha Mauludiah	CD	24 March 2025	19 November 2025	Copenhagen		
Luxembourg	Andy Rachmianto	CD	8 October 2025	23 April 2026	Brussels		
North Macedonia	Listiana Operananta	CD	24 March 2025	4 December 2025	Sofia		
Malawi (Note: One ambassador, resident in Maputo, is accredited to Malawi and Mozambique.)	Kartika Candra Negara	CD	24 March 2025	pending	Maputo		
Madagascar	Lanang Seputro	CD	5 February 2024	25 April 2024	Antananarivo		
Malaysia	Mohammad Iman Hascarya Kusumo	PA	8 October 2025	20 January 2026	Kuala Lumpur		
Maldives (Note: One ambassador, resident in Colombo, is accredited to Maldives and Sri Lanka.)	Darianto Harsono	CD	pending	pending	Colombo		
Mali	Ardian Wicaksono	CD	24 March 2025	30 October 2025	Dakar		
Malta	Junimart Girsang	PA	24 March 2025	18 February 2026	Rome		
Marshall Islands (Note: One ambassador, resident in Manila, is accredited to Marshall Islands, Palau, and Philippines.)	Josef Nae Soi	PA	pending	pending	Manila		
Mauritania (Note: One ambassador, resident in Rabat, is accredited to Mauritania and Morocco.)	Yuyu Sutisna	PA	24 March 2025	21 May 2026	Rabat		
Mauritius	Lanang Seputro	CD	5 February 2024	25 April 2024	Antananarivo		
Mexico	Toferry Primanda Soetikno	CD	25 August 2025	16 April 2026	Mexico City		
Micronesia	Nurmala Kartini Sjahrir	PA	19 December 2025	pending	Tokyo		
Moldova (Note: One ambassador, resident in Bucharest, is accredited to Moldova and Romania.)	Meidyatama Suryodiningrat	PA	26 June 2023	23 January 2024	Bucharest		
Monaco	Mohamad Oemar	CD	25 October 2021	17 May 2022	Paris		
Mongolia	Irawan Ronodipuro	PA	pending	pending	Beijing		
Montenegro (Note: One ambassador, resident in Belgrade, is accredited to Montenegro and Serbia.)	Andreano Erwin	CD	24 March 2025	7 July 2025	Belgrade		
Morocco	Yuyu Sutisna	PA	24 March 2025	14 May 2026	Rabat		
Mozambique	Kartika Candra Negara	CD	24 March 2025	11 September 2025	Maputo		
Myanmar	vacant since 2023	N/A	N/A	N/A	Yangon		
Namibia	Mirza Nurhidayat	CD	24 March 2025	13 August 2025	Windhoek		
Nauru	Dupito Simamora	CD	26 June 2023	19 April 2024	Suva		
Netherlands (Note: One ambassador, resident in Den Haag, is accredited to Netherlands and OPCW.)	Laurentius Amrih Jinangkung	CD	8 October 2025	25 February 2026	Den Haag		
Nepal	Listyowati	CD	8 October 2025	14 October 2026	Dhaka		
New Zealand	Dindin Wahyudin	CD	pending	pending	Wellington		
Nicaragua	Hendra Halim	CD	24 March 2025	23 October 2025	Panama City		
Niger	Bambang Suharto	CD	24 March 2025	15 January 2026	Abuja		
Nigeria	Bambang Suharto	CD	24 March 2025	4 December 2025	Abuja		
Niue	Dindin Wahyudin	CD	pending	pending	Wellington		
North Korea	Gina Yoginda	PA	19 December 2025	pending	Pyongyang		
Norway	Teuku Faizasyah	CD	26 June 2023	21 September 2023	Oslo		
Oman (Note: One ambassador, resident in Muscat, is accredited to Oman and Yemen.)	Andi Rahadian	CD	10 April 2026	10 September 2026	Muscat		
Pakistan	Chandra Warsenanto Sukotjo	PA	24 March 2025	22 August 2025	Islamabad		
Palau	Josef Nae Soi	PA	pending	pending	Manila		
Palestine	Iwan Freddy Hari Susanto	CD	pending	pending	Amman		
Panama	Hendra Halim	CD	24 March 2025	23 July 2025	Panama City		
Papua New Guinea (Note: One ambassador, resident in Port Moresby, is accredited to Papua New Guinea and Solomon Islands.)	Okto Dorinus Manik	CD	19 December 2025	19 May 2026	Port Moresby		
Paraguay	Sulaiman Syarif	CD	25 October 2023	4 March 2024	Buenos Aires		
Peru	Epiphania Riris Wusananingdyah	CD	pending	pending	Lima		
Philippines	Josef Nae Soi	PA	pending	pending	Manila		
Poland	Derry Aman	CD	pending	pending	Warsaw		
Portugal	Susi Marleny Bachsin	PA	24 March 2025	26 May 2025	Lisbon		
Qatar	Syahda Guruh Langkah Samudera	CD	8 October 2025	11 February 2026	Doha		
Romania	Meidyatama Suryodiningrat	PA	26 June 2023	14 September 2023	Bucharest		
Russia	Jose Antonio Morato Tavares	CD	26 October 2020	18 May 2021	Moscow		
Rwanda	Albert Abdi	CD	pending	pending	Dar es Salaam		
Saint Kitts and Nevis	Azis Nurwahyudi	CD	pending	pending	Bogotá		
Saint Lucia	Fikry Cassidy	CD	24 March 2025	pending	Caracas		
Saint Vincent and the Grenadines	Fikry Cassidy	CD	24 March 2025	5 November 2025	Caracas		
Samoa	Dindin Wahyudin	CD	pending	pending	Wellington		
San Marino	Junimart Girsang	PA	24 March 2025	29 August 2025	Rome		
Sao Tome and Principe	Bambang Suharto	CD	24 March 2025	10 February 2026	Abuja		
Saudi Arabia (Note: One ambassador, resident in Riyadh, is accredited to Saudi Arabia and OIC.)	Abdul Aziz Ahmad	PA	25 October 2021	20 September 2022	Riyadh		
Senegal	Ardian Wicaksono	CD	24 March 2025	14 October 2025	Dakar		
Serbia	Andreano Erwin	CD	24 March 2025	7 July 2025	Belgrade		
Seychelles	Lanang Seputro	CD	5 February 2024	25 April 2024	Antananarivo		
Sierra Leone	Ardian Wicaksono	CD	24 March 2025	pending	Dakar		
Singapore	Hotmangaradja Pandjaitan	PA	8 October 2025	27 January 2026	Singapore		
Slovakia	Redianto Heru Nurcahyo	PA	19 December 2025	29 October 2026	Bratislava		
Slovenia	Damos Dumoli Agusman	CD	17 November 2021	20 April 2022	Vienna		
Solomon Islands	Okto Dorinus Manik	CD	19 December 2025	12 August 2026	Port Moresby		
Somalia	Witjaksono Adji	CD	24 March 2025	3 December 2025	Nairobi		
South Africa	Ayodhia Kalake	CD	pending	pending	Pretoria		
South Korea	Cecep Herawan	CD	24 March 2025	2 September 2025	Seoul		
South Sudan	Witjaksono Adji	CD	24 March 2025	pending	Nairobi		
Spain (Note: One ambassador, resident in Madrid, is accredited to Spain and UN Tourism.)	Tri Tharyat	CD	pending	pending	Madrid		
Sri Lanka	Darianto Harsono	CD	pending	pending	Colombo		
Sudan	Sigit Witjaksono	CD	pending	pending	Khartoum		
Suriname	Agus Priono	CD	24 March 2025	26 June 2025	Paramaribo		
Sweden	Yayan Ganda Hayat Mulyana	CD	24 March 2025	11 September 2025	Stockholm		
Switzerland	I Gede Ngurah Swajaya	CD	26 June 2023	17 October 2023	Bern		
Syria	Lukman Hakim Siregar	CD	8 October 2025	29 July 2026	Damascus		
Tajikistan	Bagus Hendraning Kobarsyih	CD	pending	pending	Astana		
Tanzania	Albert Abdi	CD	pending	pending	Dar es Salaam		
Thailand (Note: One ambassador, resident in Bangkok, is accredited to Thailand and UNESCAP.)	Hari Prabowo	CD	19 December 2025	22 June 2026	Bangkok		
Timor Leste	Sigit Suryantoro Widiyanto	CD	pending	pending	Dili		
Togo	Bambang Suharto	CD	24 March 2025	pending	Abuja		
Tonga	Dindin Wahyudin	CD	pending	pending	Wellington		
Trinidad and Tobago	Fikry Cassidy	CD	24 March 2025	28 May 2026	Caracas		
Tunisia	Ratih Sanggarwati	PA	pending	pending	Tunis		
Turkey	Achmad Rizal Purnama	CD	26 June 2023	17 January 2024	Ankara		
Turkmenistan	Zaim Al Khalis Nasution	CD	pending	pending	Tehran		
Tuvalu	Dupito Simamora	CD	26 June 2023	20 March 2024	Suva		
Uganda	Witjaksono Adji	CD	24 March 2025	pending	Nairobi		
Ukraine	Arief Muhammad Basalamah	CD	26 June 2023	17 August 2023	Kyiv		
United Arab Emirates	Judha Nugraha	CD	25 August 2025	1 December 2025	Abu Dhabi		
United Kingdom	Baringin Panggabean	PA	pending	pending	London	List	
United States of America	Indroyono Soesilo	PA	25 August 2025	17 December 2025	Washington, D.C.		
Uruguay	Sulaiman Syarif	CD	25 October 2023	16 May 2024	Buenos Aires		
Uzbekistan	Siti Ruhaini Dzuhayatin	PA	24 March 2025	27 November 2025	Tashkent		
Vanuatu	Siswo Pramono	CD	25 October 2021	30 March 2023	Canberra		
Venezuela	Fikry Cassidy	CD	24 March 2025	30 July 2025	Caracas		
Vietnam	Adam Mulawarman Tugio	CD	8 October 2025	6 February 2026	Hanoi		
Yemen	Andi Rahadian	CD	10 April 2026	pending	Muscat		
Zambia (Note: One ambassador, resident in Harare, is accredited to Zambia and Zimbabwe.)	Arief Hidayat	CD	24 March 2025	27 May 2026	Harare		
Zimbabwe	Arief Hidayat	CD	24 March 2025	1 October 2025	Harare		

In addition to the ambassadors, Indonesia has maintained a de facto embassy in Taiwan, the Indonesian Economic and Trade Office to Taipei. The office is headed by a Ministry of Trade official and reports directly to the Minister of Trade. The current head of office is Arif Sulistiyo, who has served since 19 September 2024.

== Ambassadors to international organizations ==
In contrast to all other Indonesian permanent missions, which is either headed by a permanent representative or double hatted with an ambassador, the Indonesian permanent representative to the Organisation of Islamic Cooperation is double hatted with the Indonesian consul general in Jeddah. Both the consulate general and the embassy in Riyadh (of which the consulate general is subordinate to) is accredited to the Organisation of Islamic Cooperation.

Current ambassadors from Indonesia to international organizations:

Host organization	Ambassador	Background	Confirmed	Credentials	Website	Host country	List	Ref.
African Union	Faizal Chery Sidharta	CD	24 March 2025	15 October 2025	Addis Ababa	Ethiopia		
Association of Southeast Asian Nations	Lintang Parnohadiningrat	CD	pending	pending	Jakarta			
Caribbean Community	Agus Priono	CD	24 March 2025	19 November 2025	Paramaribo	Suriname		
Comprehensive Nuclear-Test-Ban Treaty Organization	Damos Dumoli Agusman	CD	17 November 2021	3 March 2022	Vienna	Austria		
Conference on Disarmament (Note: One ambassador, resident in Geneva, is accredited to the CD, ILO, ITU, UNCTAD, UNHCR, UNOG, WEF, WIPO, WHO, WMO, and WTO.)	Sidharto Reza Suryodipuro	CD	25 August 2025	15 December 2025	Geneva			
Economic Community of West African States	Bambang Suharto	CD	24 March 2025	4 June 2026	Abuja	Nigeria		
European Union	Andy Rachmianto	CD	8 October 2025	5 May 2026	Brussels	Belgium		
Food and Agriculture Organization	Junimart Girsang	PA	24 March 2025	6 August 2025	Rome	Italy		
International Anti-Corruption Academy	Damos Dumoli Agusman	CD	17 November 2021	29 March 2022	Vienna	Austria		
International Atomic Energy Agency	Damos Dumoli Agusman	CD	17 November 2021	21 February 2022	Vienna	Austria		
International Civil Aviation Organization	Muhsin Syihab	CD	24 March 2025	3 September 2025	Ottawa	Canada		
International Fund for Agricultural Development	Junimart Girsang	CD	24 March 2025	17 September 2025	Rome	Italy		
International Maritime Organization	Desra Percaya	CD	26 October 2020	pending	London	United Kingdom		
International Institute for the Unification of Private Law	Junimart Girsang	CD	24 March 2025	26 August 2025	Rome	Italy		
International Labour Organization	Sidharto Reza Suryodipuro	CD	25 August 2025	pending	Geneva			
International Seabed Authority (Note: One ambassador, resident in New York, is accredited to the ISA and UN.)	Umar Hadi	CD	25 August 2025	pending	New York City			
International Telecommunication Union	Sidharto Reza Suryodipuro	CD	25 August 2025	pending	Geneva			
Organisation for the Prohibition of Chemical Weapons	Laurentius Amrih Jinangkung	CD	8 October 2025	26 February 2026	Den Haag	Netherlands		
Organisation of Islamic Cooperation	Abdul Aziz Ahmad	CD	29 May 2023	10 September 2023	Jeddah	Saudi Arabia		
OPEC Fund for International Development	Damos Dumoli Agusman	CD	17 November 2021	10 February 2022	Vienna	Austria		
Southern African Development Community	vacant since 2026	N/A	N/A	N/A	Pretoria	South Africa		
United Nations	Umar Hadi	CD	25 August 2025	19 September 2025	New York City			
United Nations Conference on Trade and Development	Sidharto Reza Suryodipuro	CD	25 August 2025	pending	Geneva			
United Nations Economic and Social Commission for Asia and the Pacific	Hari Prabowo	CD	19 December 2025	17 April 2026	Bangkok	Thailand		
United Nations Educational, Scientific and Cultural Organization	Mohamad Oemar	CD	25 October 2021	7 January 2022	Paris	France		
United Nations Environment Programme	Witjaksono Adji	CD	24 March 2025	29 September 2025	Nairobi	Kenya		
United Nations Human Settlements Programme	Witjaksono Adji	CD	24 March 2025	29 September 2025	Nairobi	Kenya		
United Nations High Commissioner for Refugees	Sidharto Reza Suryodipuro	CD	25 August 2025	pending	Geneva			
United Nations Industrial Development Organization	Damos Dumoli Agusman	CD	17 November 2021	10 March 2022	Vienna	Austria		
United Nations Office at Geneva	Sidharto Reza Suryodipuro	CD	25 August 2025	26 November 2025	Geneva			
United Nations Office at Vienna	Damos Dumoli Agusman	CD	17 November 2021	22 February 2022	Vienna	Austria		
United Nations Office on Drugs and Crime	Damos Dumoli Agusman	CD	17 November 2021	22 February 2022	Vienna	Austria		
United Nations World Tourism Organization	Muhammad Najib	CD	25 October 2021	17 October 2022	Madrid	Spain		
World Customs Organization	Andy Rachmianto	CD	8 October 2025	pending	Brussels	Belgium		
World Economic Forum	Sidharto Reza Suryodipuro	CD	25 August 2025	pending	Geneva			
World Food Programme	Junimart Girsang	CD	24 March 2025	2 September 2025	Rome	Italy		
World Intellectual Property Organization	Sidharto Reza Suryodipuro	CD	25 August 2025	pending	Geneva			
World Health Organization	Sidharto Reza Suryodipuro	CD	25 August 2025	pending	Geneva			
World Meteorological Organization	Sidharto Reza Suryodipuro	CD	25 August 2025	pending	Geneva			
World Trade Organization	Sidharto Reza Suryodipuro	CD	25 August 2025	12 January 2026	Geneva			

== See also ==
- Foreign relations of Indonesia
- List of diplomatic missions of Indonesia

== Bibliography ==
- Suprapto, Stephanie Lidya Nashirah (2024), Patronase dan Pengangkatan Duta Besar Republik Indonesia di Era Presiden Joko Widodo (2014-2024) (Thesis), Depok: University of Indonesia
