= Rahadian =

Rahadian is an Indonesian surname. Notable people with the surname include:

- Andi Rahadian (born 1969), Indonesian diplomat
- Reza Rahadian (born 1987), Indonesian actor
- Yogi Rahadian (born 1995), Indonesian footballer
