= Hendra Halim =

Indonesian diplomat (born 1967)

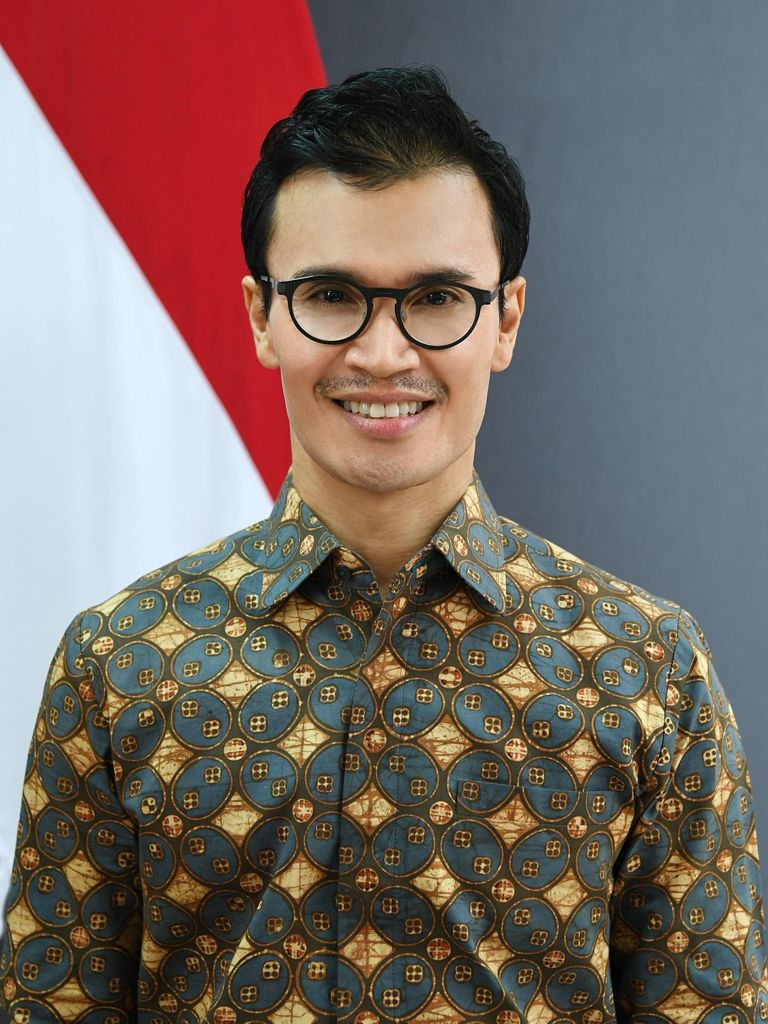

Ambassador of Indonesia to Panama, Costa Rica, Honduras, and Nicaragua
- Incumbent
- Assumed office 24 March 2025
- Preceded by: Sukmo Harsono

Personal details
- Born: April 25, 1967 (age 59) Jambi, Indonesia
- Education: University of Jambi; Monash University

Hendra Halim (born 25 April 1967) is an Indonesian diplomat who is currently serving as the ambassador to Panama, with concurrent accreditation to Costa Rica, Honduras, and Nicaragua since 2025. Prior to his appointment, he served as the director of Europe II in the foreign ministry and consul general in Vancouver

== Career ==
Born in Jambi on 25 April 1967, Hendra holds a bachelor's degree in development economics from the Jambi University and a master's degree in international trade from the Monash University. Since joining the foreign ministry in March 1995, Hendra has been posted to Indonesian representatives abroad, including as a consul at the Indonesian consulate general in New York since 21 March 2000, and at the embassies in Dakar and Mexico City. By 2012, he became the chief of data and working papers within the secretariat of the America and Europe directorate general. Sometime in the mid 2010s, he was posted to the embassy in Bern, becoming the chief of the embassy's economic section with the rank of minister-counsellor. During his tenure, the embassy established a permanent display warehouse for Indonesian products in Basel.

Upon serving in Bern, Hendra was briefly assigned to the directorate for Asia, Pacific, and Africa inter-regional cooperation before assuming office as the director of Europe II, covering Central Europe and Scandinavia, on 4 April 2018. During his tenure, he briefly became the acting director of Europe III, covering Eastern Europe, the Scandinavia, Balkans, and Turkey. He was involved in senior officials meeting with various Central, Eastern and North Europe countries, including accompanying foreign minister Retno Marsudi in a dialogue with her Latvian counterpart in 2019. He represented Indonesia in negotiations for the Indonesia-European Free Trade Association Comprehensive Economic Partnership Agreement.

On 4 May 2021, Hendra became the consul general in Vancouver. Hendra officially began his tenure in July. From July to December 2024, Hendra became the chair of the ASEAN Consuls General in Vancouver (ACGV) Committee. During his chairmanship, the consulate general hosted the 57th ASEAN anniversary celebration. He officially ended his tenure on 30 April 2025 and handed over duties to chargé d'affaires ad interim Pinardi Priambodo.

In August 2024, President Joko Widodo nominated Hendra as Indonesia's ambassador to Panama, with concurrent accreditation to Costa Rica, Honduras, and Nicaragua. He passed a fit and proper test held by the House of Representative's first commission in September that year and was installed by President Prabowo Subianto on 24 March 2025. He presented his credentials to President of Panama José Raúl Mulino on 23 July 2025, President of Costa Rica Rodrigo Chaves Robles on 17 October 2025, President of Honduras Xiomara Castro on 21 October 2025, and to the foreign minister of Nicaragua Valdrack Jaentschke on 23 October 2025.
