= Darianto Harsono =

Indonesian diplomat (born 1968)

Ambassador of Indonesia to Sri Lanka
- Incumbent
- Assumed office pending confirmation
- Preceded by: Dewi Gustina Tobing

Personal details
- Born: 30 August 1968 (age 58)
- Education: Jember University

Darianto Harsono (born 30 August 1968) is an Indonesian career diplomat who is nominated as ambassador to Sri Lanka, with concurrent accreditation to the Maldives. He is currently the consul general in Istanbul, serving since 2023. Before his current office, Darianto was the director of South America and the Caribbean in the foreign ministry.

== Life and career ==
Born on 30 August 1968, Darianto received his bachelor's degree from the Jember University. He entered the foreign ministry in March 1994. His first overseas posting was at the embassy in Paris sometime around 2001, where he was accorded the rank of attaché for economic affairs. He then returned to the foreign ministry as a section head in charge of international trade and related matters, before undergoing a second round of overseas assignment at the embassy in Vienna. He started off his assignment on 25 January 2005 as second secretary for information and socio-cultural affairs and was promoted to first secretary a few years later.

From February 2016, Darianto was appointed as a deputy director within the directorate of America II, which covers South America and the Caribbean in the ministry. His jurisdiction was the third area of the directorate, covering Ecuador, Colombia, and Bolivia, before being shifted to the second area, covering Brazil, Suriname, and Guyana several months before the end of his term. In October 2018, Darianto accompanied a number of bloggers and influencers from Europe and Latin America to visit and promote tourism in Banyuwangi. On 22 April 2019, Darianto was appointed to head the directorate. During his tenure, the INA-LAC forum to encourage investment from Latin America and the Caribbean was organized in October 2022. On 29 May 2023, Darianto became the consul general in Istanbul, Turkey. On 21 May 2026, Darianto welcomed nine Indonesian citizens of the 2025 Global Sumud Flotilla who arrived in Istanbul after previously apprehended by the Israeli authorities.

On 10 August 2026, Darianto was nominated by President Prabowo Subianto as ambassador to Sri Lanka, with concurrent accreditation to the Maldives. He underwent a parliamentary vetting process by the House of Representative's first commission on 22 September 2026.
