= Faizal Chery Sidharta =

Indonesian diplomat (born 1971)

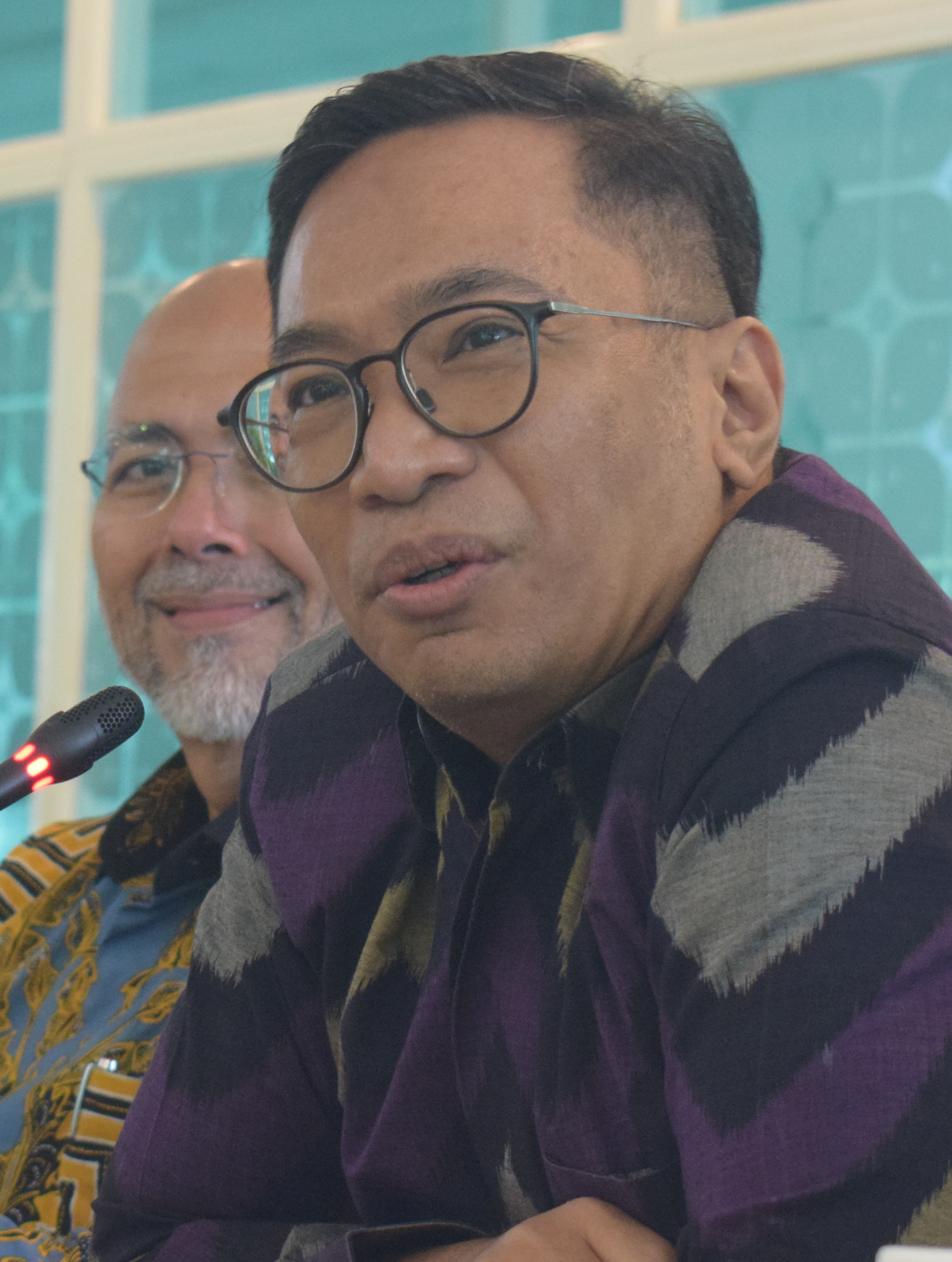

Ambassador of Indonesia to Ethiopia, Djibouti, Eritrea, and African Union
- Incumbent
- Assumed office 24 March 2025
- President: Prabowo Subianto
- Preceded by: Al Busyra Basnur

Personal details
- Born: March 27, 1971 (age 55)
- Spouse: Yuniarti Retno Handayani
- Education: University of Indonesia (S.Sos., M.Si.)

Faizal Chery Sidharta (born 27 March 1971) is an Indonesian diplomat who is currently serving as the Ambassador of Indonesia to Ethiopia since 24 March 2025.

== Career ==
Born on 27 March 1971, Faizal holds a bachelor's and master's degree in international relations from the University of Indonesia. He joined the foreign ministry in March 1999. He has been assigned at the protocol and consular section of the embassy in Moscow with the rank of third secretary, political section of the embassy in Berlin with the rank of counsellor, and head of section at the ASEAN functional cooperation. He was then appointed as the chief of the transnational crime countermeasures subdirectorate in the Directorate of International Security and Disarmament, during which he was involved in handling matters relating to mass immigration and refugees. He also attended the Thirteenth United Nations Congress on Crime Prevention and Criminal Justice in 2015.

Faizal was assigned to the Indonesian permanent mission in Geneva for UN and other international organizations as a minister counsellor. He was then assigned to the ASEAN directorate general in the foreign ministry, where he became the director for political and security cooperation in September 2019 and director for external cooperation.

In August 2024, President Joko Widodo nominated Faizal Chery as Indonesia's ambassador to Ethiopia, with concurrent accreditation to Djibouti, Eritrea, and the African Union. He passed a fit and proper test held by the House of Representative's first commission in September that year. He was installed by President Prabowo Subianto on 24 March 2025. He presented his credentials to the president of Ethiopia Taye Atske Selassie on 14 October 2025, the Chairperson of the African Union Commission Mahamoud Ali Youssouf on 15 October, and the president of Djibouti Ismaïl Omar Guelleh on 15 December.

== Personal life ==
Faizal is married to Yuniarti Retno Handayani.
