= Kartika Candra Negara =

Indonesian diplomat (born 1969)

Ambassador of Indonesia to Mozambique and Malawi
- Incumbent
- Assumed office 24 March 2025
- President: Prabowo Subianto
- Preceded by: Herry Sudrajat

Personal details
- Born: 26 September 1969 (age 56) Blitar, East Java, Indonesia
- Spouse: Novita Nugraheny
- Education: Airlangga University; Rijksuniversitair Centrum Antwerpen

Kartika Candra Negara (born 26 September 1969) is an Indonesian diplomat who currently serves as the ambassador to Mozambique, with concurrent accreditation to Malawi, since 2025. Previously he was the director for inter institutional relations within the Ministry of Tourism and Creative Economy and consul general in Dubai.

== Early life ==
Born on 26 September 1969, in Blitar, Kartika holds a bachelor's degree in international relations from the Airlangga University and a master's degree in global management and development at the Rijksuniversitair Centrum Antwerpen, now the University of Antwerp.

== Career ==
Kartika started his career in March 1995. He was assigned as the chief of counterterrorism outside UN framework section within the foreign department from 2005 to 2007, before being posted abroad to the political affairs section of the embassy in Washington D.C. with the rank of first secretary.

He returned to Indonesia in 2011, and was assigned as deputy director (chief of subdirectorate) for other regional organizations in 2012. After a three-year stint, he was sent to the embassy in Ottawa to head its economic affairs section with the rank of minister-counsellor. He was then appointed as the director for inter-institutional and international relations of the Creative Economy Agency in 2018, serving until the agency was usurped by the Ministry of Tourism and Creative Economy in 2019. In the new ministry, Kartika provisionally assumed duties as director for inter-institutional relations until his permanent appointment on 5 February 2020. Several months later, on 7 December Kartika was posted to Dubai as consul general.

In August 2024, President Joko Widodo nominated Kartika as Indonesia's ambassador to Mozambique, with concurrent accreditation to Malawi. He passed a fit and proper test held by the House of Representative's first commission in September that year and was installed by President Prabowo Subianto on 24 March 2025. Upon his appointment to Mozambique and Malawi, he addressed the lack of mutual information exchange and understanding between the people of Indonesia and Southern Africa. To address this, his priority has been to utilize preferential trade agreement between Indonesia and Mozambique, which is a key milestone as Mozambique is the only African country with such. Kartika views Mozambique as a strategic gateway for Indonesian products to reach other landlocked countries in Southern Africa, such as Zambia, Zimbabwe, and Malawi. Additionally, he has advocated for the establishment of a bilateral investment treaty to provide legal protection and encourage Indonesian investors to expand into the region. He received his duties from chargé d'affaires ad interim Budi Santoso on 23 June 2025. He presented his credentials to the President of Mozambique Daniel Chapo on 11 September 2025.

== Personal life ==
Kartika is married to Novita Nugraheny.
