= Lukman Hakim Siregar =

Indonesian diplomat (born 1969)

Ambassador of Indonesia to Syria
- Incumbent
- Assumed office 8 October 2025
- President: Prabowo Subianto
- Preceded by: Wajid Fauzi

Personal details
- Born: 31 January 1969 (age 57) Rondaman, South Tapanuli, North Sumatra, Indonesia
- Spouse: Siti Nursyamsiah
- Children: 1
- Education: University of Riau; African University Djibouti

Lukman Hakim Siregar (born 31 January 1969) is an Indonesian diplomat who is currently the ambassador of Indonesia to Syria since 2025. Previously, he served as assistant deputy for international relations and defense to vice presidents Ma'ruf Amin and Gibran Rakabuming Raka from 2021 to 2025.

== Early life and education. ==
Lukman was born on 31 January 1969 in Rondaman, South Tapanuli, as the son of Sutan Guru and Rabiah. He studied international relations at the University of Riau in 1989, receiving his bachelor's degree in 1993. He then pursued his master's degree in international political economics at the African University Djibouti in Cairo, Egypt, from 1993 to 1996. He later received a scholarship from the foreign department to pursue master's degree in international relations at the University of Indonesia, which he completed in 1999.

== Career ==
From 1996 to 1997, Lukman worked as a local staff at the Indonesian embassy in Cairo. He was then accepted to the foreign department, where he was assigned to the directorate of ASEAN economic cooperation. In 2007, he erved within the political section of the embassy in Amman with the rank of second secretary. He was then transferred to the Middle East directorate of the foreign ministry. Following the 2015 Sousse attacks, Lukman was listed as a contact person for citizens seeking consultation before traveling to Tunisia. He then served for three and a half years at the political section of the embassy in Kabul with the rank of counsellor until January 2020.

After serving within various postings in the Middle East, on 1 July 2021 Lukman assumed office as assistant deputy for international relations to vice president Ma'ruf Amin. He briefly assumed duties as the acting deputy for national policy support and national vision in 2022. Lukman retained his position after Ma'ruf was replaced by Gibran Rakabuming Raka.

Lukman was nominated as Indonesia's ambassador to Syria in July. He underwent a closed assessment by the House of Representative's first commission on 6 July and was approved in a session two days later. He was installed as ambassador on 8 October 2025 and received his duties from chargé d'affaires ad interim Lutfi Anggara on 8 January 2026. He handed over his copies of credentials to foreign minister Asaad al-Shaibani on 7 April 2026 and presented his letters of credence to president Ahmed al-Sharaa on 29 July 2026.

== Personal life ==
Lukman is married to Siti Nursyamsiah and has one children.
