= Agung Cahaya Sumirat =

Indonesian diplomat (born 1970)

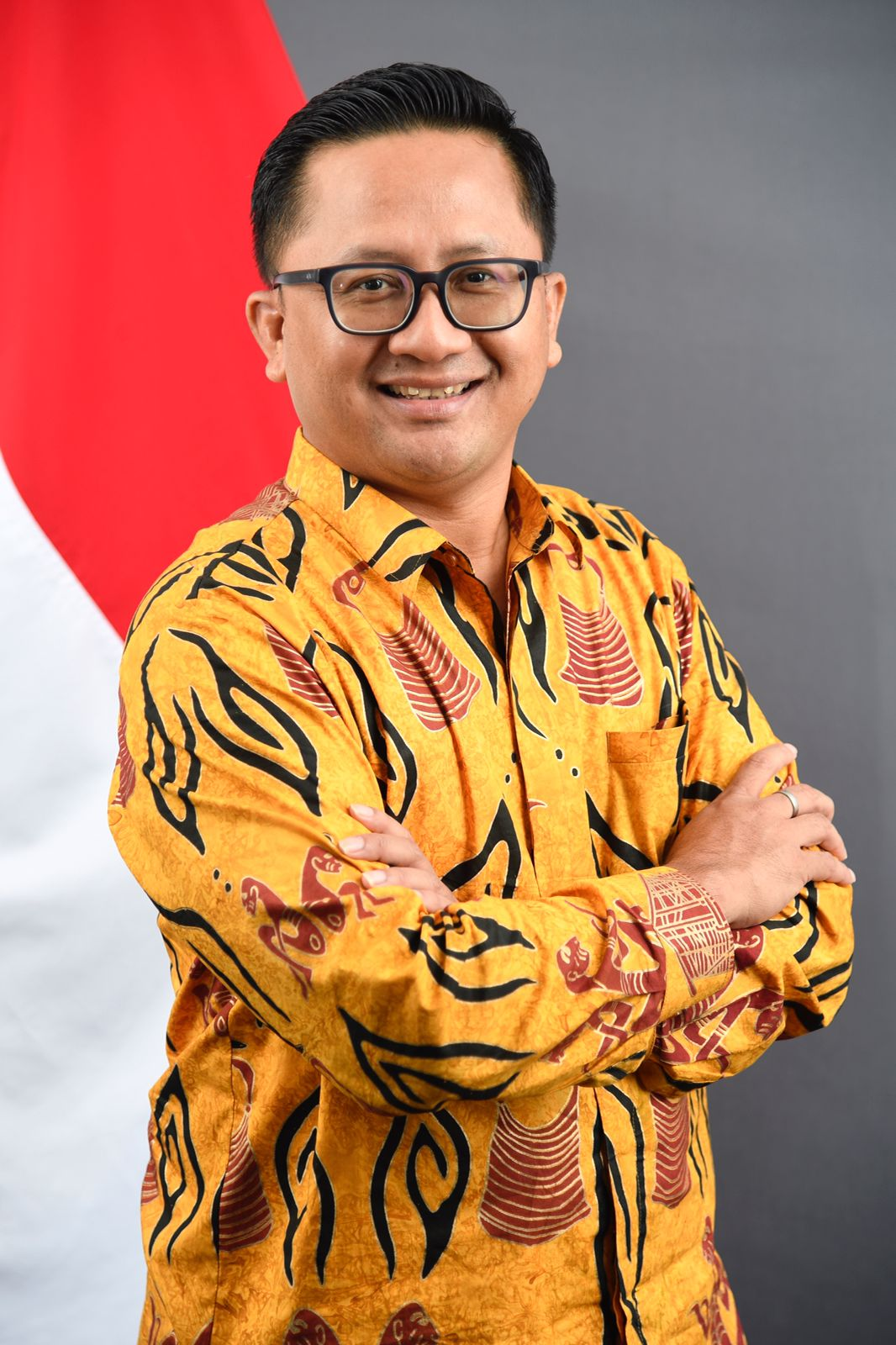

Ambassador of Indonesia to Cameroon
- Incumbent
- Assumed office 24 March 2025
- Preceded by: office established

Personal details
- Born: 5 June 1970 (age 56) Wates, Kulon Progo, Yogyakarta, Indonesia
- Education: Gadjah Mada University; University of Indonesia

Agung Cahaya Sumirat (born 5 July 1970) is an Indonesian diplomat currently serving as the ambassador to Cameroon with concurrent accreditation to the Central African Republic, Chad, Equatorial Guinea, the Republic of the Congo, and Gabon, since 24 March 2025. Prior to this ambassadorial role, he was the Director of Diplomatic Security at the Ministry of Foreign Affairs of the Republic of Indonesia from October 2021 to July 2025.

== Early life and education ==
Agung was born on 5 July 1970 in Wates, Kulon Progo, Yogyakarta. Upon completing high school at the 1st Wates State High School in 1989, Sumirat continued his education at the Gadjah Mada University (UGM), majoring in international relations. He received his bachelor's degree in 1997 from the university, with a thesis on ASEAN's response to regionalism in the Asia-Pacific region. He obtained his master's degree on the same subject from the University of Indonesia in 2002 with a thesis on Indonesia's negotiation efforts to counter EU’s initiative regarding human rights on the 58th session of the Commission on Human Rights.

== Career ==
Agung's diplomatic career began with an overseas assignment as third secretary for political affairs at Indonesia's permanent mission in Geneva from March 2003 to September 2006. He returned to Jakarta afterwards and was appointed as section head at the foreign ministry's directorate of economic development and environmental affairs from October 2006 to December 2009. He was then posted as consul for Information, Social and Cultural Affairs at Indonesia's consulate general in Vancouver from January 2010 to December 2013. In this role, he focused on promoting Indonesian cultures and fostering closer connections between Indonesia and western Canada, highlighting Indonesian activism at various festivals and collaborating with universities on academic discussions, educational cooperation, cultural events, environmental collaboration, and interfaith dialogue. From January 2014 to February 2017, Sumirat served as deputy director (chief of subdirectorate) for Asian-European meeting in the directorate for American and European relations. In his role, he managed Asia Europe Meeting (ASEM) matters, supporting his director in facilitating contacts, communication, and coordination among ASEM stakeholders.

Agung then moved to the Indonesian embassy in Kuala Lumpur where he served as minister-counsellor responsible for information, cultural, and social affairs, from February 2017 to August 2020. He focused on promoting enhanced social and cultural relations between Indonesia and Malaysia. During this period, Agung also served as the acting headmaster of the Indonesian School in Kuala Lumpur and chaired the foreign election committee in the country during the 2019 general election. He was then promoted to deputy ambassador in September 2020. During his tenure in the Kuala Lumpur embassy, Agung oversaw the improvement of the online service system, which became crucial during the COVID-19 pandemic, as well as the enhanced cooperation between the embassy and Indonesian community organizations through the Alliance of Indonesian Community Organizations (AOMI) to distribute aid and repatriating vulnerable citizens during the pandemic. The embassy's improved capacity to respond to inquiries via social media and hotlines earned them the Hassan Wirajuda Award for social media. Agung served for less than a year as deputy ambassador, as on 18 August 2021 Agung was installed as the director of diplomatic security in the foreign ministry. He was responsible for ensuring the safety of Indonesian diplomatic missions abroad, foreign missions in Indonesia, and coordinating inter-agency teams for foreign NGO operations in Indonesia.

In August 2024, President Joko Widodo nominated Agung as Indonesia's ambassador to Cameroon, with concurrent accreditation to the Central African Republic, Chad, Equatorial Guinea, the Republic of the Congo, and Gabon. He passed a fit and proper test held by the House of Representative's first commission in September that year. He was installed by President Prabowo Subianto on 24 March 2025. He became the first ambassador since an embassy was established in 2020.

Shortly after his installation, he and five other new ambassadors from UGM met with UGM rector Ova Emilia and Yogyakarta governor Hamengkubuwono X. He arrived in Cameroon on 1 July and presented copies of his credentials to Delegate to the Minister of External Relations in charge of Relations with the Commonwealth Government Félix Mbayu the day after. He presented his credentials to president Brice Oligui Nguema of Gabon on 17 March 2026, president Faustin-Archange Touadéra of the Central African Republic on 17 July 2026.
