= Iwan Freddy Hari Susanto =

Indonesian diplomat (born 1969)

Ambassador of Indonesia to Jordan
- Incumbent
- Assumed office pending confirmation
- Preceded by: Ade Padmo Sarwono

Personal details
- Born: 10 October 1969 (age 56)
- Spouse: Riviana Pasah
- Education: Airlangga University (S.H.); Monash University (M.A.)

Iwan Freddy Hari Susanto (born 10 November 1969) is an Indonesian career diplomat who is the currently nominated as ambassador of Indonesia to Yemen. He is the foreign ministry's director of North and Central America since 2021. Previously, he held several American-related positions in the Indonesian diplomatic service, including as the chief of information, and later, deputy chief of mission at the Indonesian embassy in Washington, D.C.

== Early life and education ==
Iwan was born on 10 November 1969. He received his bachelor's degree in international law from the Airlangga University and master's degree in foreign affairs and trade from the Monash University.

== Diplomatic career ==
Iwan joined the foreign ministry in March 1995. He was posted to the embassy in Washington D.C. sometime in 2004 with the rank of second secretary, where he acted as the embassy's spokesperson and later, the acting chief of information affairs. In this role, he reported on the results of the 2004 Indonesian presidential election in the United States. By 2008, Iwan served at the economic section of the embassy in Beijing with the rank of first secretary. He was then assigned to the East Asia and Pacific directorate in the foreign ministry as deputy director for political and security cooperation with Southeast Asian countries until 2015. From there, Iwan was sent to the embassy in Canberra as coordinator for socio-cultural affairs with the diplomatic rank of minister counsellor.

Iwan returned to Washington, D.C. in late 2018 with his appointment as the deputy chief of mission of the Indonesian embassy to the U.S. Iwan became the embassy's chargé d'affaires following the appointment of ambassador Muhammad Lutfi as trade minister in December 2020. Rosan Roeslani, then chairperson of Indonesia's commerce chamber, took over the leadership of the embassy as the newly appointed ambassador on 1 December 2021. Iwan, who has been installed as director of North and Central America on 18 August 2021, left his deputy chief of mission posting on 15 January 2022. In 2023, Iwan voiced his support on behalf of the government regarding the redeployment of the US government sponsored Peace Corps volunteers to Indonesia.

On 10 August 2026, Iwan was nominated by President Prabowo Subianto as ambassador to Jordan, with concurrent accreditation to Palestine. He underwent a parliamentary vetting process by the House of Representative's first commission on 22 September 2026.
