= Mirza Nurhidayat =

Indonesian diplomat (born 1967)

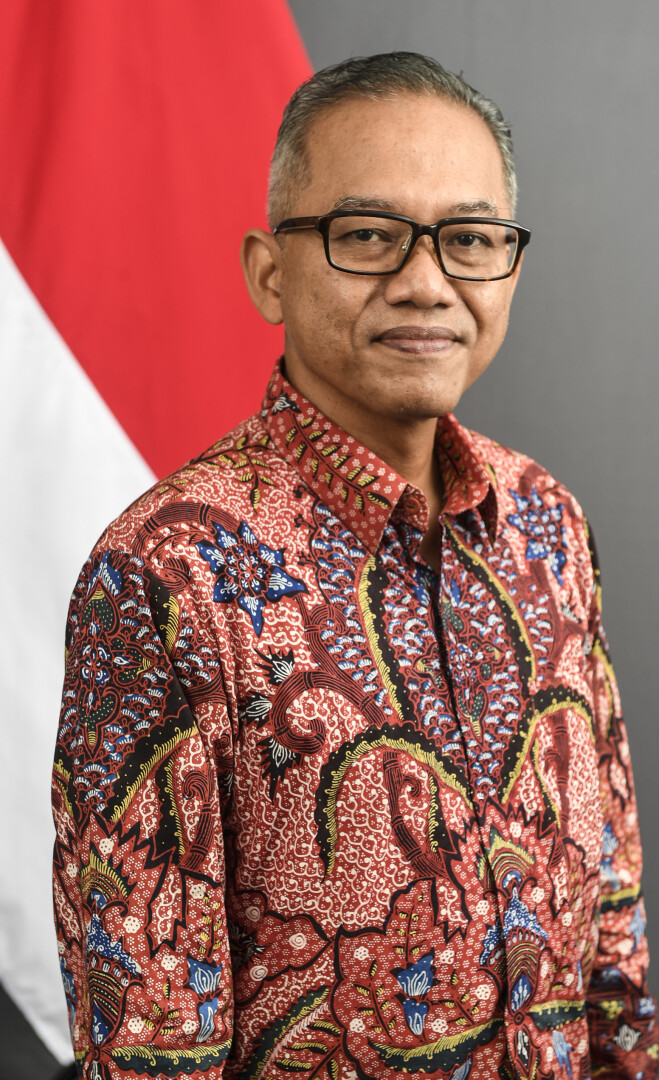

Ambassador of Indonesia to Namibia and Angola
- Incumbent
- Assumed office 24 March 2025
- Preceded by: Wisnu Edi Pratignyo

Personal details
- Born: 14 March 1967 (age 59) Semarang, Central Java, Indonesia
- Spouse: Masita Rochmaya
- Children: 2
- Parent: Karmani (father)
- Education: Diponegoro University

Mirza Nurhidayat (born 14 March 1967) is an Indonesian diplomat who is serving as Indonesia's ambassador to Namibia and Angola. Prior to his appointment, he served as consul general in Osaka and director of Southeast Asia in the ministry foreign affairs.

== Early life and education ==
Mirza was born on 14 March 1967 in Semarang to Karmani, a legal scholar and politician who served as dean of Diponegoro's University law faculty and a member of the House of Representatives. Upon completing high school in 1985, Mirza studied law at the Diponegoro University.

== Career ==
Mirza joined the foreign ministry in March 1991. By 1992, he was posted to the ASEAN directorate general, serving until 1996. He was then assigned overseas as third secretary at the embassy in Nigeria from 1996 to 2000. During his posting in Nigeria, he described Nigerians as having a strong character and tend to keep their distance from foreigners, which he himself speculated due to the ongoing conflicts in the country at the time of his posting. He also collected unique African agate stones during his time in there.

Returning to Indonesia, he served as chief of section at the directorate general for foreign economic relations from 2002 to 2003. From 2003 to 2007, he was posted to the embassy in Tokyo as head of the economic section with the rank of second secretary, and later, first secretary. He received his accreditation for his duties in Tokyo on 19 June 2003.

Following this, he became head of section in the directorate general for legal affairs and international treaties from 2007 to 2010. During this period, he also served as acting deputy director (chief of subdirectorate) for political and security treaties. In 2011, he served in the political section at the permanent mission to ASEAN until 2012, after which he became minister-counsellor for political affairs at the embassy in Singapore, a role he held until 2014. During his tenure in Singapore, he was entrusted to chair the foreign election committee for the 2014 general election in the country.

From December 2014 to 2018, he was the chief of planning and organization bureau of the foreign ministry before assuming his current role as consul general in Osaka on 12 January 2018. He arrived in Osaka on 20 April. On 6 October 2020, Mirza was installed as the director for Southeast Asian affairs in the ministry, with responsibilities on formulating and coordinating bilateral relations with Southeast Asian countries. He left Osaka on 24 January 2021 after handing over his office as consul general two days earlier.

In August 2024, President Joko Widodo nominated Mirza as Indonesia's ambassador to Namibia and Angola. He passed an assessment held by the House of Representative's first commission in September that year. He was installed by President Prabowo Subianto on 24 March 2025. He presented his credentials to President of Namibia Netumbo Nandi-Ndaitwah on 13 August 2025 and to the President of Angola João Lourenço on 20 October 2025.

== Personal life ==
Mirza Nurhidayat is married to Masita Rochmaya and has two children.
