= Vedi Kurnia Buana =

Indonesian diplomat (born 1971)

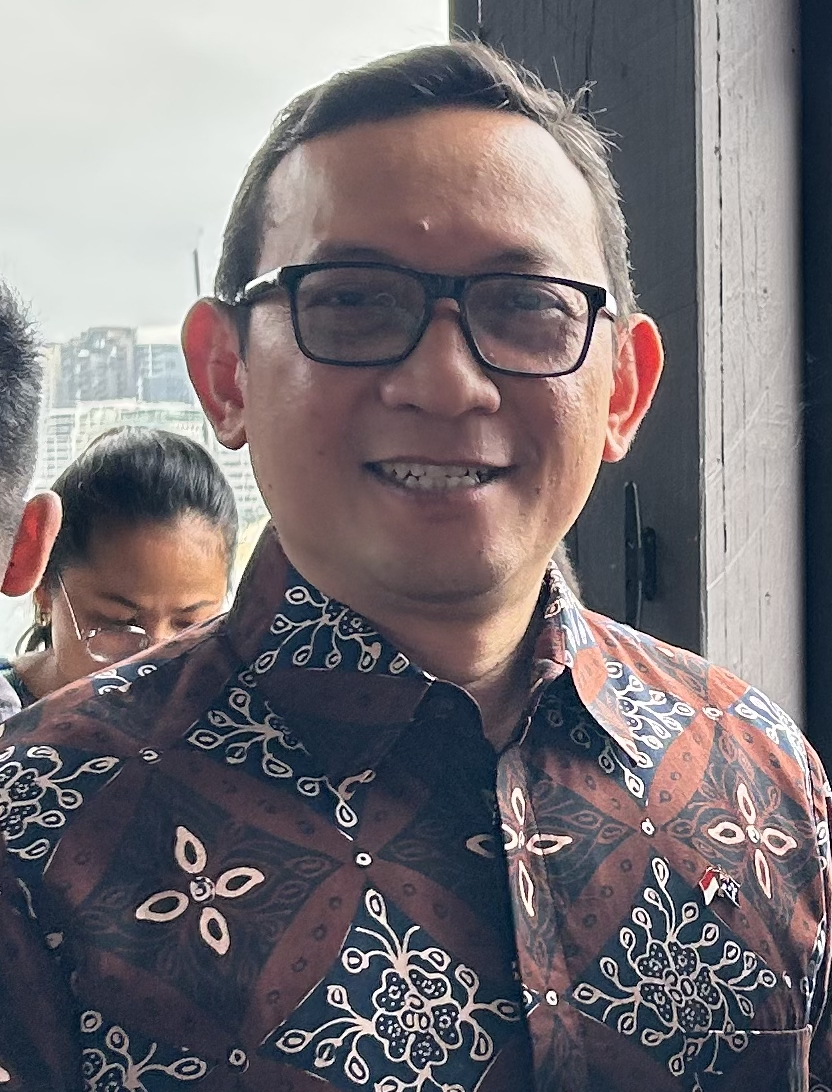

Ambassador of Indonesia to Chile
- Incumbent
- Assumed office 24 March 2025
- Preceded by: Muhammad Anshor

Personal details
- Born: 29 January 1971 (age 55) Cilegon, West Java, Indonesia
- Spouse: Fanny Erlita
- Children: 2
- Education: Padjadjaran University; Telkom University; University of Indonesia

Vedi Kurnia Buana (born 29 January 1971) is a career diplomat from Indonesia who currently serves as the ambassador to Chile. Prior to his appointment, he was secretary of the ASEAN directorate general and consul general in Sydney.

== Early life and education ==
Vedi Kurnia Buana was born on 29 January 1971 in Cilegon. He is the fifth of six children born to parents who met and married while they were students in Bandung. His father, from Rangkasbitung, was a vocational high school student majoring engineering, and his mother, from Serang, attended a women's vocational school. His father, who worked at Trikora Steel (now the Krakatau Steel), later became a small business owner. He attended the Krakatau Steel Foundation preschool and elementary school before sending him and his siblings to Bandung for their education, as they believed a larger city would offer more opportunities. He attended the 13th State Junior High School from 1984 to 1987 and the 3rd State High School in Bandung from 1987 to 1990.

Vedi began studying international relations at the Padjadjaran University in 1990 after his initial applications for medical and environmental engineering programs were unsuccessful. It was at the university that he met his future wife, Fanny Erlita Buana, who was an anthropology student. After completing his undergraduate degree in 1995, Buana pursued a master's degree in management at the Telkom University.

== Career ==
In 1997, Vedi applied for the foreign ministry, a decision influenced by his desire to find a challenging career. The recruitment process was extensive, taking a full year to complete. He officially joined the ministry in May 1997, two months before he graduated with his master's degree from Telkom. He was informed during his initial training that as a diplomat, he would need to be ready for assignments anywhere in the world, not just in major capitals. Upon being accepted to the foreign ministry, he was tasked to pursue master's studies in international relations at the University of Indonesia, which he completed in 2000.

Throughout his career, Buana has been assigned to several diplomatic posts. He has served at the consulate in Hong Kong and in Cape Town. Around the mid 2010s, Vedi served at the embassy in Seoul as counsellor for economic affairs. He was then posted to the ASEAN directorate general to serve as its secretary on 4 April 2018, where he was responsible for administrative and coordination between the directorates inside the agency. After about three years, Vedi was posted to Sydney as consul general on 18 August 2021, with responsibilities covering the New South Wales, Queensland, and South Australia. He arrived on 7 September, presented his agrément on the same day, and introduced himself to Indonesians living in the area on 17 September. During his tenure, Vedi supported the screening of the EKSIL documentary at the University of Sydney as well as the launching of the e-pasport service for Indonesian citizens in Sydney. The first e-passports in the city were given to a 93-year-old WNI and a 5-year-old child, symbolizing inclusivity and future readiness.

In August 2024, President Joko Widodo nominated Vedi as Indonesia's ambassador to Chile. He passed a fit and proper test held by the House of Representative's first commission in September that year and was installed by President Prabowo Subianto on 24 March 2025. He presented his credentials to President of Chile Gabriel Boric on 13 August 2025.

== Personal life ==
Buana is married to Fanny Erlita Buana, and they have two daughters, Zalfa and Amara. Fanny's father, Abdul Manan Saiman, served as the regent of the Riau Islands from 1990 to 2000.
