= Albert Abdi =

Indonesian diplomat (born 1970)

Ambassador of Indonesia to Tanzania, Burundi, Rwanda, and the East African Community
- Incumbent
- Assumed office pending confirmation
- Preceded by: Tri Yogo Jatmiko

Personal details
- Born: 12 December 1970 (age 55) Padang, West Sumatra
- Education: Andalas University (S.E.); University of Indonesia (M.Si.)

Albert Abdi (born 12 November 1970) is an Indonesian career diplomat who is currently nominated as ambassador to Tanzania, with concurrent accreditation to Burundi, Rwanda, and the East African Community, resident in Dar es Salaam. He is currently the inspector of the 1st region in the foreign ministry's inspectorate general, serving since 2023. Throughout his career, he had been assigned to diplomatic missions in Sri Lanka and Australia

== Education ==
Albert was born in Padang on 12 December 1970. He spent most of his childhood in Jakarta, as he completed his primary education at the 4th Pondok Bambu elementary school in 1983, and his secondary education at the 51th Jakarta State Middle School in 1986 and the 12th Jakarta State High School in 1989. He studied economics at the Andalas University from 1989 to 1995, and pursued master's degree in international relations at the University of Indonesia from 1998 to 2000. From 2006 to 2007, Albert studied at the National University of Modern Languages and acquired his advanced diploma in English.

== Diplomatic career ==
Albert briefly worked at the Bluebird Group taxi for two years from 1996 before admitted to the foreign ministry in March 1998. By 2010, Albert had attained the diplomatic rank of first secretary, and was assigned to the economic section of the embassy in Sri Lanka under ambassador Djafar Husein. After Djafar's term ended in 2012, Albert became the embassy's chargé d'affaires until the arrival of a new ambassador a few months later.

In 2017, Albert was posted at the consulate general in Melbourne and was assigned as an economic consul. As the consulate's second most senior official, he was entrusted additional duties as its head of chancery. His portofolio was later shifted to information, social, and cultural matters, where in 2019 he emphasized Papua's existence within Indonesia as non-negotiable and final following protests demanding the independence of Papua in front of the consulate general chancery.

On 31 January 2023, Albert was installed as the inspector I in the foreign ministry's inspectorate general, with responsibilities on supervising Indonesian diplomatic missions in Asia, as well as the Asia, Pacific, and Africa directorate general, the ASEAN cooperation directorate general, and the foreign policy strategy agency.

On 10 August 2026, Albert was nominated by President Prabowo Subianto as ambassador to Tanzania. He underwent a parliamentary vetting process by the House of Representative's first commission on 22 September 2026.
