= Syahda Guruh Langkah Samudera =

Indonesian diplomat (born 1976)

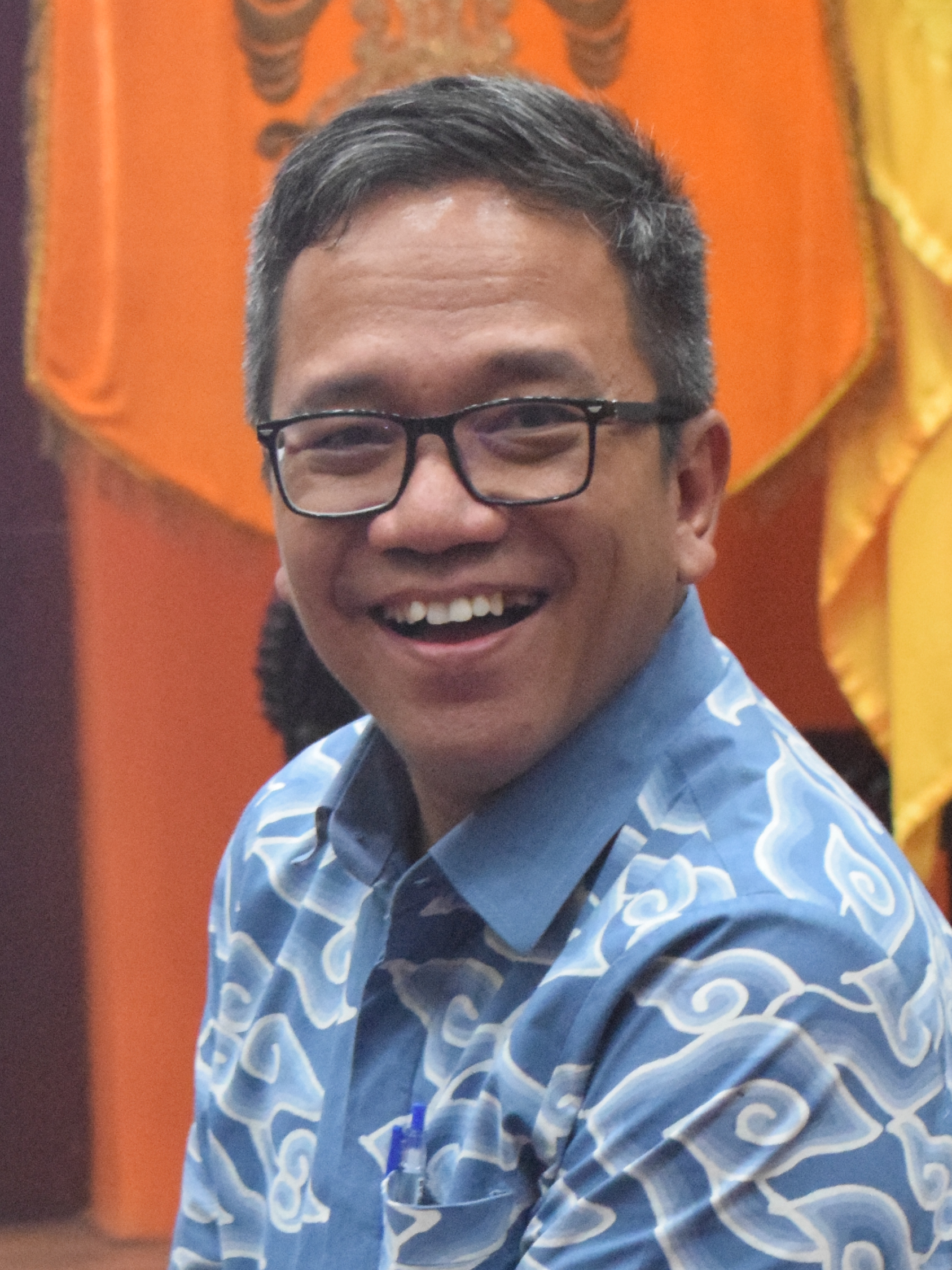

Ambassador of Indonesia to Qatar
- Incumbent
- Assumed office 8 October 2025
- President: Prabowo Subianto
- Preceded by: Ridwan Hassan

Personal details
- Born: 24 November 1976 (age 49)
- Spouse: Crownishinta Bintang Shakuntala
- Education: Brawijaya University (S.H.); University of Indonesia (M.H.)

Syahda Guruh Langkah Samudera (born 24 November 1976) is an Indonesian diplomat who is currently serving as the ambassador to Qatar since 2025. He served as director for economic law and treaties within the foreign ministry from 2020 to 2025.

== Early life and education ==
Born on 24 November 1976, Syahda studied law at the Brawijaya University. He established the center for law assessment and research in the law faculty and authored two books relating to Indonesia's autonomy. Syahda received his law degree in 1999 after four years of study and, upon entering the foreign ministry, pursued a master's degree in law at the University of Indonesia from 2003 to 2005.

== Career ==
Syahda joined the foreign ministry in March 2000. His first posting at the foreign ministry was at the directorate of economic, social, and cultural treaties in January 2001, where he became its acting chief of environment treaties. His tenure focused on legal instruments such as UNFCCC and UN CBD. After four years, Syahda was assigned to the political section embassy in London for three and a half years with a focus on bilateral relations with the UK and Ireland. He also represented Indonesia at the International Maritime Organization, where he covered issues related to maritime safety, security, and marine environmental protection. He started his career in the embassy with the rank of third secretary and was later promoted to second secretary.

Upon his return to Jakarta in August 2008, he became the chief of investment treaty section within the foreign ministry, where he acted as a negotiator for bilateral investment treaty and intellectual property rights, and was a delegation to the Asia Africa Legal Consultative Organization. From February 2011 to December 2014, he served with the permanent mission to the United Nations in New York, where his responsibilities included serving as a delegation to the 2nd Committee for issues on the Post 2015 Development Agenda, and as an adviser to the Indonesia's president Susilo Bambang Yudhoyono co-chair team for the High Level Panel of Eminent Persons for the same agenda between 2012 and 2013. He also acted as a legal expert to the Indonesia delegation in the 2011 and 2012 United Nations Climate Change Conference, where he focused on legal issues regarding to the climate regime after the Paris Agreement, and as acting chief of negotiator at the First ADP meeting in Bonn in 2012. Additionally, he was the G77 coordinator for some issues of the Rio+20 outcome document in 2012, including food security, sustainable transport, and sustainable city. Syahda began his career within the diplomatic mission with the rank of second secretary of the first economic section for a year and was then promoted to first secretary.

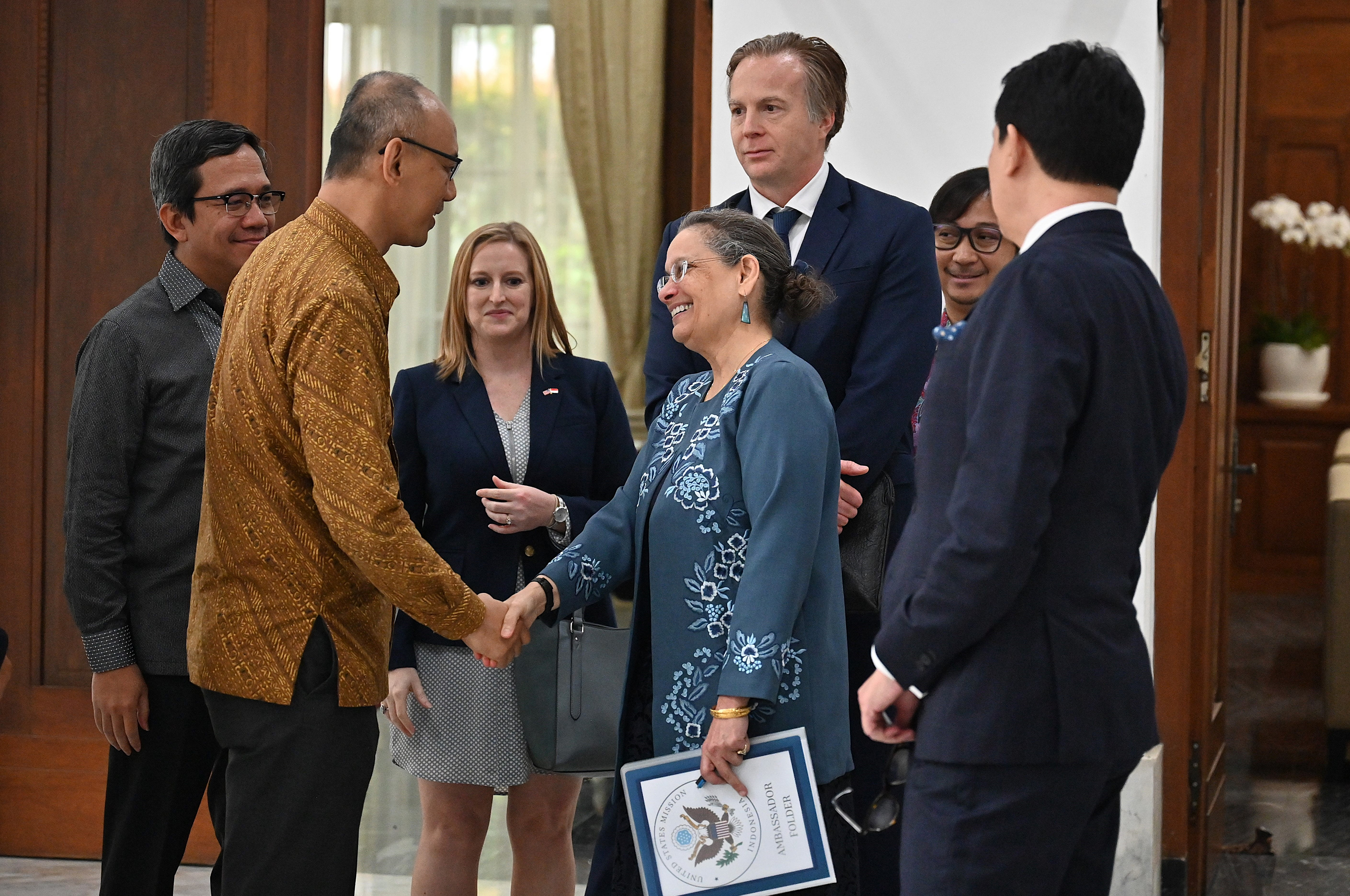
Syahda (far left) meeting with U.S. embassy officials in 2025.

Following his time in New York, Syahda returned to the foreign ministry in Jakarta, serving as deputy director (chief of subdirectorate) for trade, economic services, investment, finance and environment from February 2015 to December 2016. Upon reorganizations within the foreign ministry's structure, Syahda's subdirectorate was split into several subdirectorates, and he was named as the deputy director for trade and investment treaties in January 2017. After two years, in February 2019 he was transferred to the permanent mission to the United Nations in Geneva, Switzerland with the rank of counsellor, and later minister counsellor, to October 2020, focusing on international trade and WTO issues.

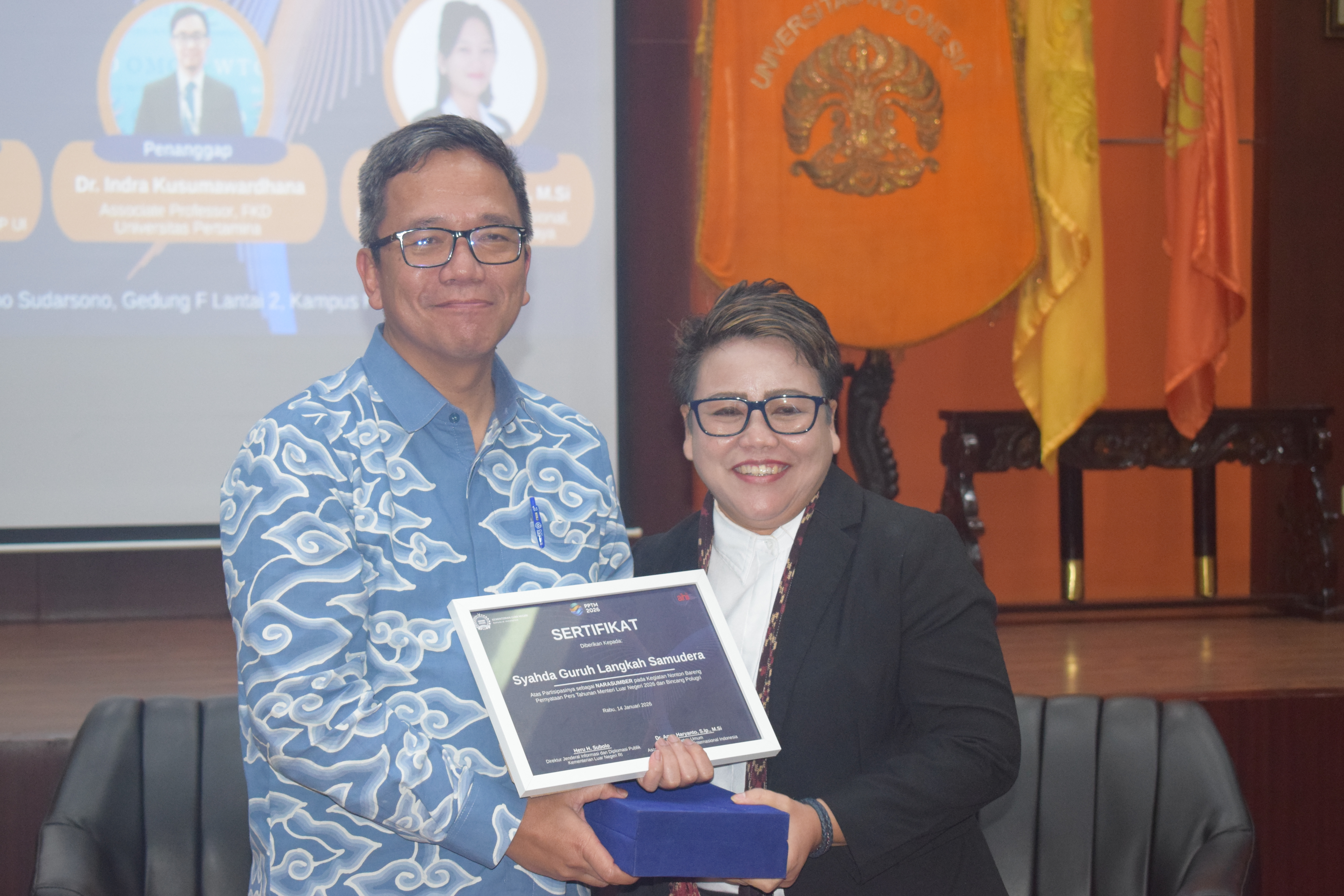
Syahda (left) with foreign ministry's public diplomacy director Ani Nigeriawati in 2026.

On 6 October 2020, Syahda became the director for economic law and treaties. President Prabowo Subianto nominated him as ambassador to Qatar in July 2025. He underwent a closed assessment by the House of Representative's first commission on 5 July and was approved in a session three days later. He was installed as ambassador on 8 October 2025 and presented his credentials to Emir of Qatar Tamim bin Hamad Al Thani on 11 February 2026.

== Personal life ==
Syahda is married to Crownishinta Bintang Shakuntala.
