= Sigit Suryantoro Widiyanto =

Indonesian diplomat (born 1970)

Ambassador of Indonesia to Timor Leste
- Incumbent
- Assumed office pending confirmation
- Preceded by: Okto Dorinus Manik

Personal details
- Born: 13 July 1970 (age 56)
- Spouse: Marsianda Widiyanto (m. 1997)
- Children: 3
- Education: Airlangga University (S.IP.)

Sigit Suryantoro Widiyanto (born 13 July 1970) is an Indonesian career diplomat who is currently nominated as ambassador to Timor Leste. He is now serving as consul general in Johor Bahru, serving since 2022. Prior to his current position, Sigit has held various appointments in Indonesian diplomatic service, including as economics chief at the embassy in Singapore and chief of general bureau in the foreign ministry's secretariat general.

== Early life, education, and personal life ==
Born on 13 July 1970, Sigit received his bachelor's degree in international relations from the Airlangga University in 1994. Sigit is married to Marsianda Widiyanto since 19 July 1997, and the couple has three sons.

== Diplomatic career ==
Sigit was admitted to the Indonesian foreign ministry in March 1995, and from July 1995 to June 1996 he underwent basic diplomatic training. He was then appointed as a section chief at the directorate for the safeguarding and supervision of Indonesian diaspora from July 1996 to June 2000, before undergoing his first assignment abroad at the embassy in Port Moresby. He was accorded the rank of third secretary, before being promoted to second secretary. Sigit returned home in January 2004 amidst the restructuring of the foreign ministry's internal agencies, and was subsequently appointed as a section chief at the directorate of South and Central Asia. It was during this period that in 2005, Sigit completed his mid-level diplomatic training.

From the foreign ministry, Sigit was sent to the embassy in Belgium in November 2006, where he was in charge of economic matters with the rank of first secretary. His portofolio was later shifted to protocol and consular affairs, and he was later promoted to counsellor. Sigit served in Brussels until January 2011, and in May that year he was appointed to the coordinating minister's office for political, legal, and security affairs as chief of the European cooperation section. He completed senior diplomatic training in 2002.

In early 2015, Sigit was appointed as the head of economics at the embassy in Singapore with the diplomatic rank of minister counsellor. He was then appointed as the head of internal (household) section of the foreign ministry's general secretariat general bureau in 2017, before being promoted to be in charge as head of the bureau in 2019. On 9 March 2022, Sigit was inducted as the consul general in Johor Bahru, departing his post as general affairs bureau head on 1 August 2022, and was officially accredited on 18 August 2022. Sigit was credited for developing border tourism, which saw Riau being the second most visited province in Indonesia after Bali, and encouraged the opening of direct economic corridors from Johor to Batam via available sea routes.

On 10 August 2026, Sigit was nominated by President Prabowo Subianto as ambassador to Timor Leste. He underwent a parliamentary vetting process by the House of Representative's first commission on 22 September 2026.
