= University of Jambi =

Public university in Jambi City, Indonesia

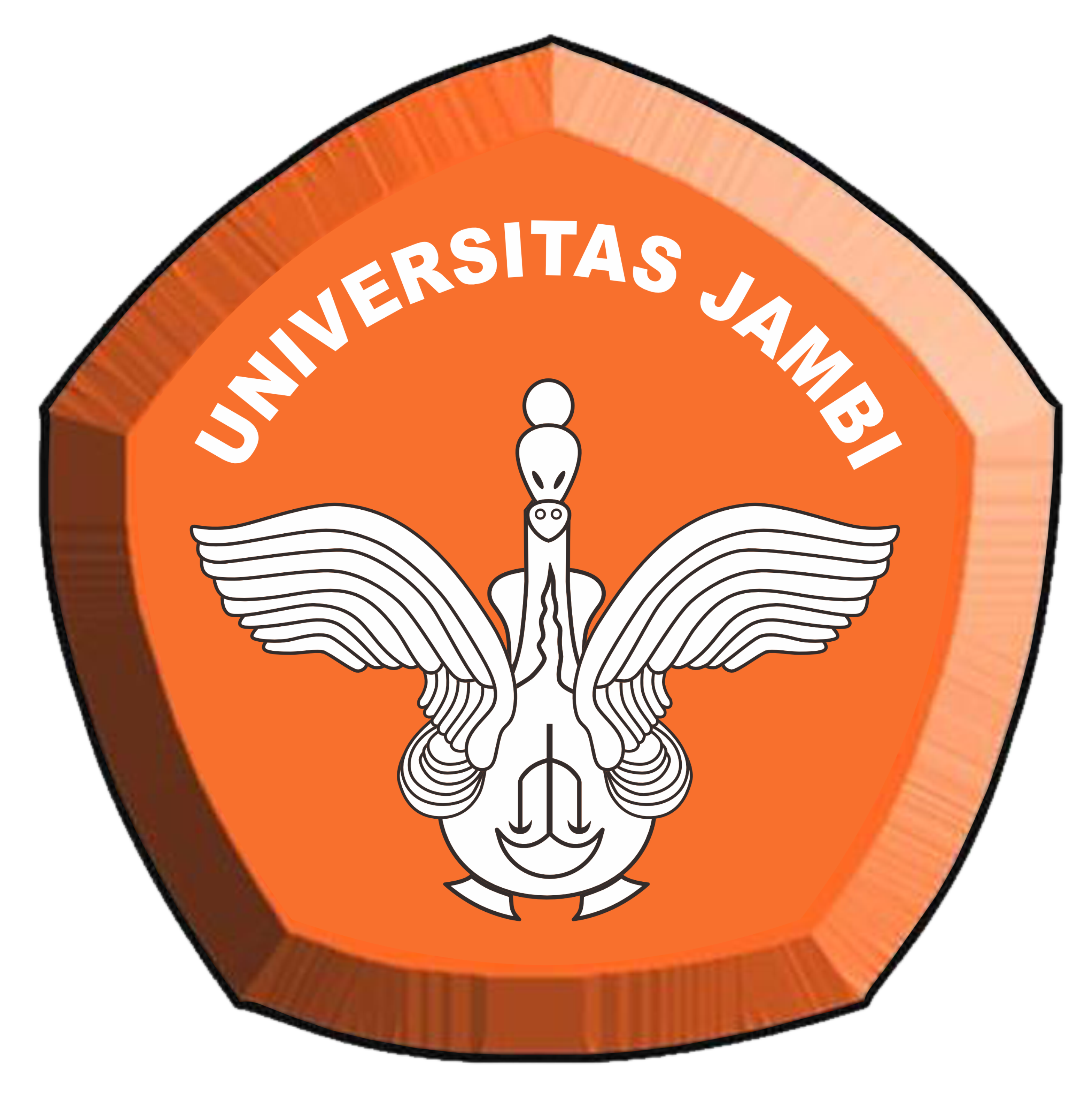
- Type: Public
- Established: 23 March 1963
- Rector: Prof. Dr. Helmi, S.H., M.H.
- Location: Jambi City, Indonesia
- Colors: Orange and white
- Website: www.unja.ac.id

The University of Jambi (UNJA, or Universitas Jambi) is a public university located in Jambi City, Jambi, Indonesia. The university was registered by Minister of PTIP decree Number 25 of 1963, as The State University of Jambi.

== History ==
=== Founding and early history ===
Before the foundation of the university, in 1960 there was Akademi Perniagaan Djambi (the Academy of Commerce in Jambi) under Jajasan Perguruan Tinggi Djambi (the Foundation of Tertiary Education in Jambi) which was chaired by R. Sudarsono who was the mayor of the city. In 1961, the academy transformed itself as the Faculty of Economics along with the establishment of the Faculty of Law, both affiliated to University of Indonesia Faculty of Economics. With those faculties, local public figures and Jambi provincial government were seeking to establish a university in their own region through Panitia Persiapan Pendirian Universitas Negeri Jambi (The Establishment of Jambi State University Preparatory Committee). The committee was headed by Col. M.J. Singedekane who was the governor of Jambi.

The State University of Jambi was the result of the committee established on 1 April 1963. The committee then opened two more faculties, The Faculty of Agriculture and The Faculty of Animal Agriculture and as of 1 April 1963, The State University of Jambi had faculties of Economics, Law, Agriculture and Animal Agriculture. From that day on, 1 April is commemorated as the day of birth of the university.

In 1966, Indonesian President issued a decree declaring the establishment of the university as Jambi University. The letter carrying the decree did not arrive in Jambi until the issuing of Presidential Decree Number 41 of 1982. The Minister of PTIP decree, beside acknowledging the foundation of the university, recognized Col. M.J. Singedekane, also acting as the head of the committee, as the president in charge leading the university. The term ‘President of the University’ started from 1963 till 1977. It ended when Drs. Kemas Mohamad Saleh was appointed as Acting Rector by Indonesian Minister of Education and Culture.

Presidents of the university before the name alteration were:

- Djamaluddin Tambunan, S.H. 1974-1977
- R.M. Nur Atmadibrata, 1968-1974
- H. A. Manap, 1966-1968
- Colonel M.J. Singedekane, 1963-1966

On 12 September 1980, Drs. Kemas Mohamad Saleh who became the Acting Rector was appointed as Rector of the university ending the transition period of leadership of the university. Since January 1985, Ir. S.B. Samad was the second Rector while completing his period in 1994. As of 1994, the rectors of the university are:

- Prof. Dr. Helmi, S.H., M.H. (since 31 January 2024)
- Prof. Drs. H. Sutrisno, M.Sc., Ph.D. (2020–2024)
- Prof. Johni Najwan, S.H., M.H., PhD (2016–2020)
- Prof. Aulia Tasman, Ph.D. (2012–2016)
- H. Kemas Arsyad Somad, S.H., M.H. (2003–2012)
- Prof. Dr. Ir. Ali M.A. Rachman, M.A (1999–2003)
- Prof. Dr. Ir. H. Soedarmadi Hardjosuwignyo, M.Sc. (1994–1999)
- Ir. S.B. Samad (1985–1994)
- Drs. Kemas Mohamad Saleh (1977–1984)
