= Sulaiman Syarif =

Indonesian diplomat (born 1965)

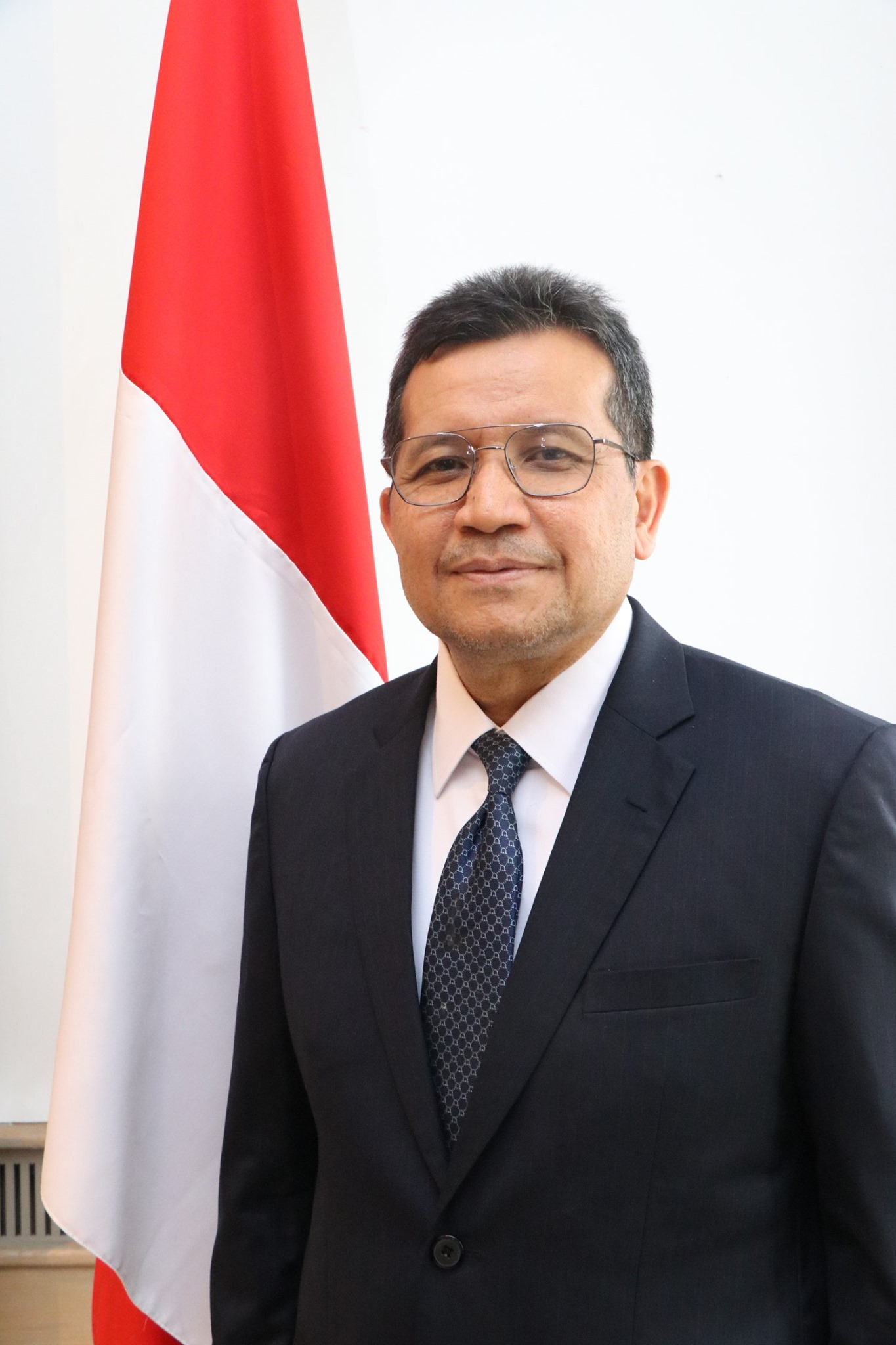

Ambassador of Indonesia to Argentina, Uruguay, and Paraguay
- Incumbent
- Assumed office 25 October 2023
- Preceded by: Niniek Kun Naryatie

Personal details
- Born: 25 October 1965 (age 60) Yogyakarta, Indonesia
- Education: University of North Sumatra; University of Indonesia

Sulaiman Syarif (born 25 October 1965) is an Indonesian diplomat who is currently serving as the Indonesian Ambassador to Argentina, Uruguay, and Paraguay since October 25, 2023.

== Early life and education ==
Sulaiman was born in Yogyakarta, Indonesia, on October 25, 1965. He began studying law at the University of North Sumatra in 1984, earning a bachelor's degree in 1990. He then obtained his master's degree in American Studies from the University of Indonesia in 2000. Further enhancing his legal and diplomatic knowledge, he participated in course programs at the Hague Academy of International Law in 2001 and the University of Maryland School of Public Diplomacy in 2016.

== Career ==
Sulaiman Syarif commenced his career in the foreign ministry in 1991. His early overseas assignments included postings at the Indonesian embassies in Athens from 1996 to 2000, The Hague from 2002 to 2006, and Brussels from 2011 to 2014. Domestically, within the Ministry of Foreign Affairs, his roles included serving as Head of Section at the Directorate of Legal and Treaty Affairs from 1993 to 1996 and again from 2000 to 2002. He then advanced to Deputy Director for Legal and Treaties on Economic and Socio-Cultural Affairs from 2006 to 2011, Deputy Director for Human Rights and Humanitarian Affairs from 2014 to 2017, and ultimately, Deputy Director General for Legal and Treaty Affairs from 2017 to 2020. From 2020 to 2023, he was the deputy ambassador at the Indonesian Embassy in Brussels, where he was accredited to Belgium, Luxembourg, and the European Union.

In January 2023, Sulaiman was nominated as ambassador to Argentina, with concurrent accreditations to Uruguay and Paraguay. His nomination was approved in February, and he was installed on 25 October 2023. He presented his credentials to President Santiago Peña of Paraguay on 4 March 2024, President Javier Milei of Argentine on 15 May 2024, and to President Luis Lacalle Pou of Uruguay on 16 May 2024.

== Personal life ==
Sulaiman Syarif is married and has one son.
