= Listiana Operananta =

Indonesian diplomat

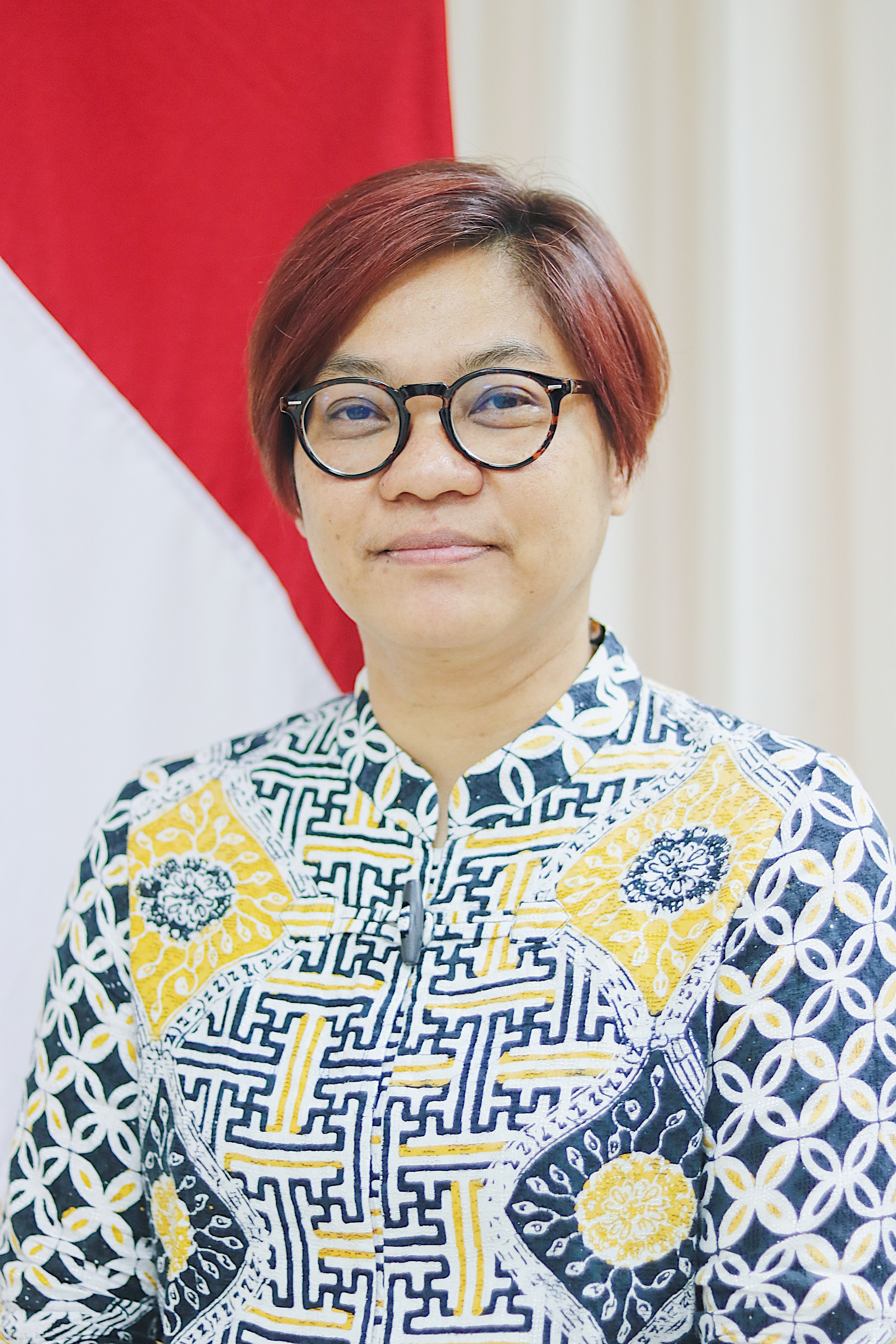

Ambassador of Indonesia to Bulgaria, Albania, and North Macedonia
- Incumbent
- Assumed office 24 March 2025
- President: Prabowo Subianto
- Preceded by: Iwan Bogananta

Personal details
- Born: 17 March 1971 (age 55) Bandung, West Java, Indonesia
- Spouse: Aldrian Munanto
- Children: 2
- Education: Parahyangan Catholic University; University of Indonesia

Listiana Operananta (born 17 March 1971) is an Indonesian diplomat who is the Ambassador of Indonesia to Bulgaria, with concurrent accreditation to Albania and North Macedonia since 24 March 2025.

== Early life and education ==
Listiana was born in Bandung on 17 March 1971. Upon completing high school, she began studying international relations at the Parahyangan Catholic University in 1989, graduating with a bachelor's degree in 1994. She then continued her master's studies on the same subject at the University of Indonesia in 1997 and graduated in 2000.

== Career ==
Listiana worked as an employee in Sony and a journalist for The Jakarta Post before beginning her career in the foreign ministry. She was assigned to the Indonesian Embassy in London as third secretary and second secretary from May 2003 to November 2006. She was then transferred to the embassy in Wellington, where she served as a counsellor for economic affairs from August 2010 to June 2014. Following her assignment in New Zealand, Listiana was appointed as the chief of information and mass media section to the foreign minister's chief of staff (administration bureau) office.

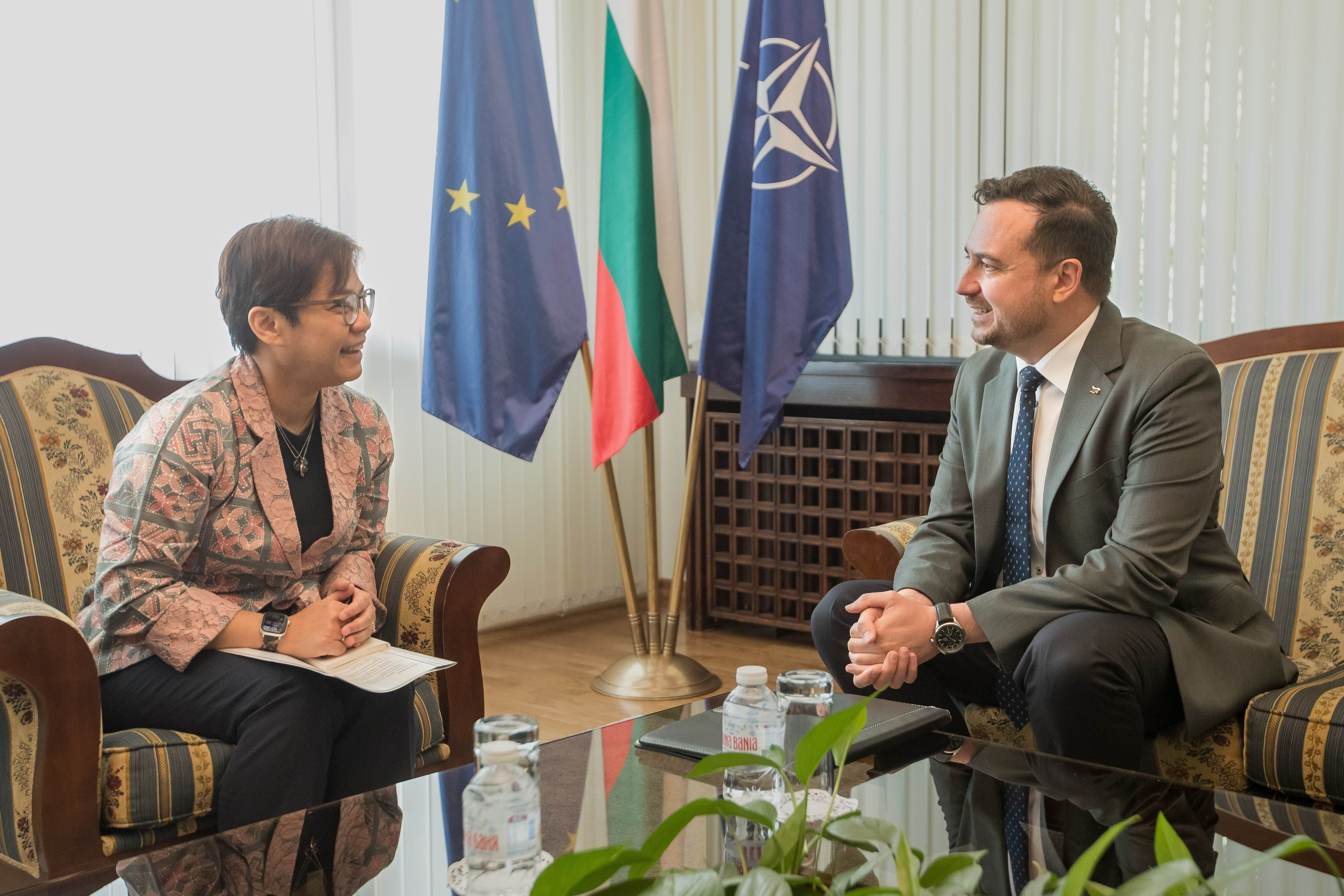
Listiana with deputy foreign minister of Bulgaria Nikolaï Pavlov on 8 July 2025.

On 4 April 2018, Listiana assumed office as the Director for Information and Media in the foreign ministry. During his tenure, she organized the inaugural Regional Conference on Digital Diplomacy and diplomacy festivals in various major cities in Indonesia. After holding office for three years, on 18 August 2021 Listiana became Indonesia's consul general in Perth, with responsibilities covering Western Australia, Cocos (Keeling) Islands, and Christmas Island. In an interview with the Australia-Indonesia Youth Association, Listiana stated that her works on cross-cultural diplomacy through personal connections and relatable experiences. She also initiated programs on women's empowerment and addressing domestic violence within the Indonesian community in Perth. She announced her departure from the post in December 2024.

In August 2024, President Joko Widodo nominated Listiana as Indonesia's ambassador to Bulgaria, with concurrent accreditation to Albania and North Macedonia. She passed a fit and proper test held by the House of Representative's first commission in September that year. She was installed by President Prabowo Subianto on 24 March 2025. She arrived in Bulgaria on 30 June and presented copies of her credentials to deputy foreign minister Nikolaï Pavlov on 8 July. She presented her credentials to the President of Bulgaria Rumen Radev on 16 October, to the President of Albania Bajram Begaj on 26 November, and to the President of North Macedonia Gordana Siljanovska-Davkova on 4 December.

== Personal life ==
Listiana is married to Aldrian Munanto and has two daughters.
