= Yusron Bahauddin Ambary =

Indonesian diplomat (born 1971)

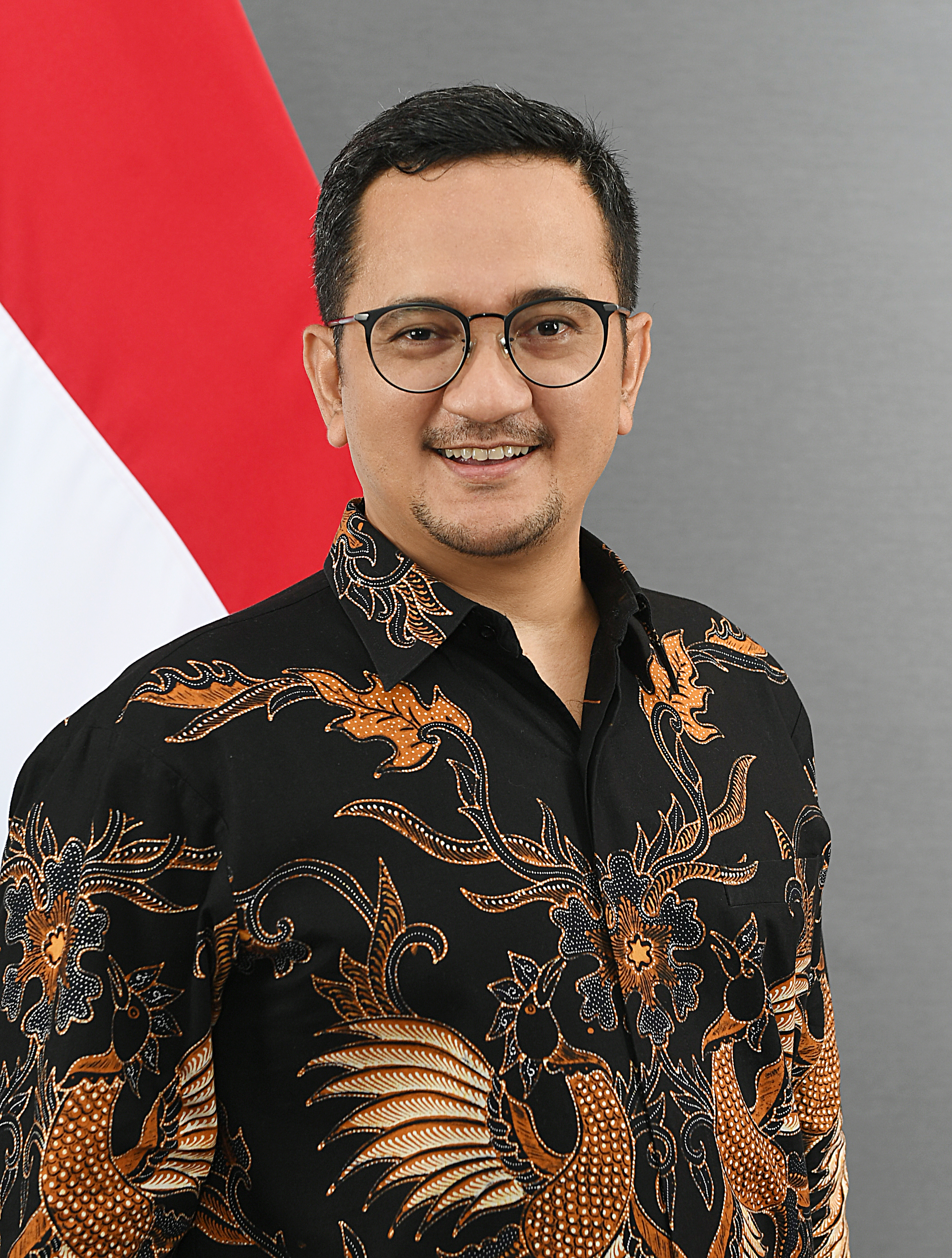

Ambassador of Indonesia to Algeria
- Incumbent
- Assumed office 19 December 2025
- Preceded by: Chalief Akbar Tjandraningrat

Personal details
- Born: March 22, 1971 (age 55) Jakarta, Indonesia
- Spouse: Raokhati Qistin
- Children: 1
- Education: Institute of Social and Political Sciences; University of Indonesia

Yusron Bahauddin Ambary (born 22 March 1971) is an Indonesian diplomat who is currently serving as Indonesia's ambassador to Algeria. Prior to his ambassadorship, he served as director for public diplomacy from 2020 to 2023 and consul general in Jeddah from 2023 to 2025.

== Early life and education ==
Yusron Bahauddin Ambary was born in Jakarta on 22 March 1971. He began his educational journey at the Muhammadiyah 21st elementary school in Central Jakarta, where he studied from 1976 until 1982. He then continued his primary education at the Saudi Arabian Indonesian School in Jeddah, Saudi Arabia, from 1982 to 1983, followed by his junior high school years at the same institution in Jeddah from 1983 to 1986, at the same time as his father's assignment as assistant to the hajj attaché at the consulate general in Jeddah. His studies abroad continued in Kuwait, where he attended Ad-dini Islamic Boarding School from 1986 to 1987 and completed his senior high school education at the Al-A'smai High School, from 1987 to 1990. Upon returning to Jakarta, he briefly attended the 20th State High School in Central Jakarta from 1990 to 1991.

Yusron studied public relations at the Institute of Social and Political Sciences in South Jakarta, earning his bachelor's degree in 1996. He continued his master's studies in international relations at the University of Indonesia in 1998, earning his degree in 2002 with a thesis on the international sanctions against Iraq.

== Career ==
Yusron began his career in the midst of his studies, where he worked at the Dewiserasi Indah Wisata Tour and Travel company. Upon his graduation, he worked in Antarini, a flight consulting company, for about a year, before moving to Sheraton Media. He then joined the foreign ministry, where he was sent to pursue his master's studies at the University of Indonesia.

Upon finishing his master's studies, Yusron was assigned to Indonesia's consulate general in Jeddah as the chief of consular affairs at the consulate general in Jeddah. He briefly served as chief of section in the foreign ministry before returning to service abroad at the embassy in Washington, serving in the embassy's protocol and consular affairs with the rank of second secretary, and later, first secretary. During his tenure, the embassy expanded its consular service by establishing a consular cafe in Blacksburg, Virginia, for Indonesian citizens in the city, who were mostly students at the Virginia Tech University.

Yusron returned to Indonesia in January 2014 as deputy director in the foreign ministry. During his tenure, Yusron and diplomat Susapto Anggoro Broto was sent to led the evacuation Indonesian citizen in Yemen in the midst of the Yemeni civil war at that time. Yusron's team was assigned to evacuate Indonesian citizens in the eastern part of Yemen, where most Indonesian citizens are concentrated. The success of the evacuation efforts was lauded by government officials, including the House of Representatives, and Indonesia's foreign ministry received evacuation requests from 10 foreign countries, including India, the U.S., UK, Malaysia, and South Africa.

After serving in the foreign ministry, Yusron was posted to the embassy in Malaysia as head of the embassy's consular affairs, with the rank of counsellor, and as the coordinator of the protection task force of Indonesian citizens in Malaysia. Yusron was instrumental in repatriating Siti Aisyah, an Indonesian citizen who was involved in the assassination of Kim Jong-nam, Kim Jong Un's half brother, in 2019. Yusron, along with immigration attache Mulkan Lekat, pioneered the “KBRI KL Jaman Now” initiative, a suite of immigration and consular service innovations in the embassy that won awards, including the Hassan Wirajuda award in 2019 and an award from in public service innovation from the state apparatus and bureaucratic reform ministry.

Upon serving in Kuala Lumpur, on 3 January 2020 Yusron was installed as the director for public diplomacy in the foreign ministry. On 29 May 2023, he was appointed as the consul general for Indonesia in Jeddah. He was responsible for managing one of the busiest consular offices due to the city's proximity to Mecca and Medina. During his tenure, he coordinated operational efforts for Indonesian pilgrims during Hajj and Umrah seasons, dealing with logistics, health, and legal protection, and provided assistance and legal protection for Indonesian citizens and migrant workers living in the region. In addition to his responsibilities as consul general, he was also designated as permanent representative to the Organization of Islamic Cooperation, where he presented his credentials to the Secretary General of the Organization of Islamic Cooperation, Hissein Brahim Taha, on 10 September 2023.

On 2 July 2026, the foreign ministry secretary general Denny Abdi instructed Yusron to be present in Jakarta for his vetting as candidate for ambassador to Algeria. At that time, he was in Jeddah to manage state visit by president Prabowo Subianto, which lasted from 1 to 3 July. His nomination was approved by the House of Representatives in a session on 8 July 2025, and the Algerian government confirmed his appointment in October 2025 shortly after Yusron finished orientation programme for ambassadors.

Yusron was sworn in as ambassador on 19 December 2025 and received his credentials on 3 February 2026. Despite already receiving his credentials, the foreign ministry instructed Yusron to remain in Jeddah until the end of the hajj season, which concluded with the departure of the last wave of Indonesian hajj pilgrims in May 2026. Before his arrival in Algeria on 5 July, on 15 April 2026 Yusron met with Algeria's ambassador to Indonesia in Jakarta to review the current state of bilateral relations between the two countries. He received his duties from chargés d'affaires ad interim Muhammad Syafri on 6 July 2026 before handing over copies of his credentials to Algeria's foreign minister Ahmed Attaf exactly a week later. On 31 August 2026, Yusron officially presented his credentials to president Abdelmadjid Tebboune.

== Personal life ==
Yusron is married to Raokhati Qistin and has a child.
