= Berlian Helmy =

Indonesian diplomat (born 1967)

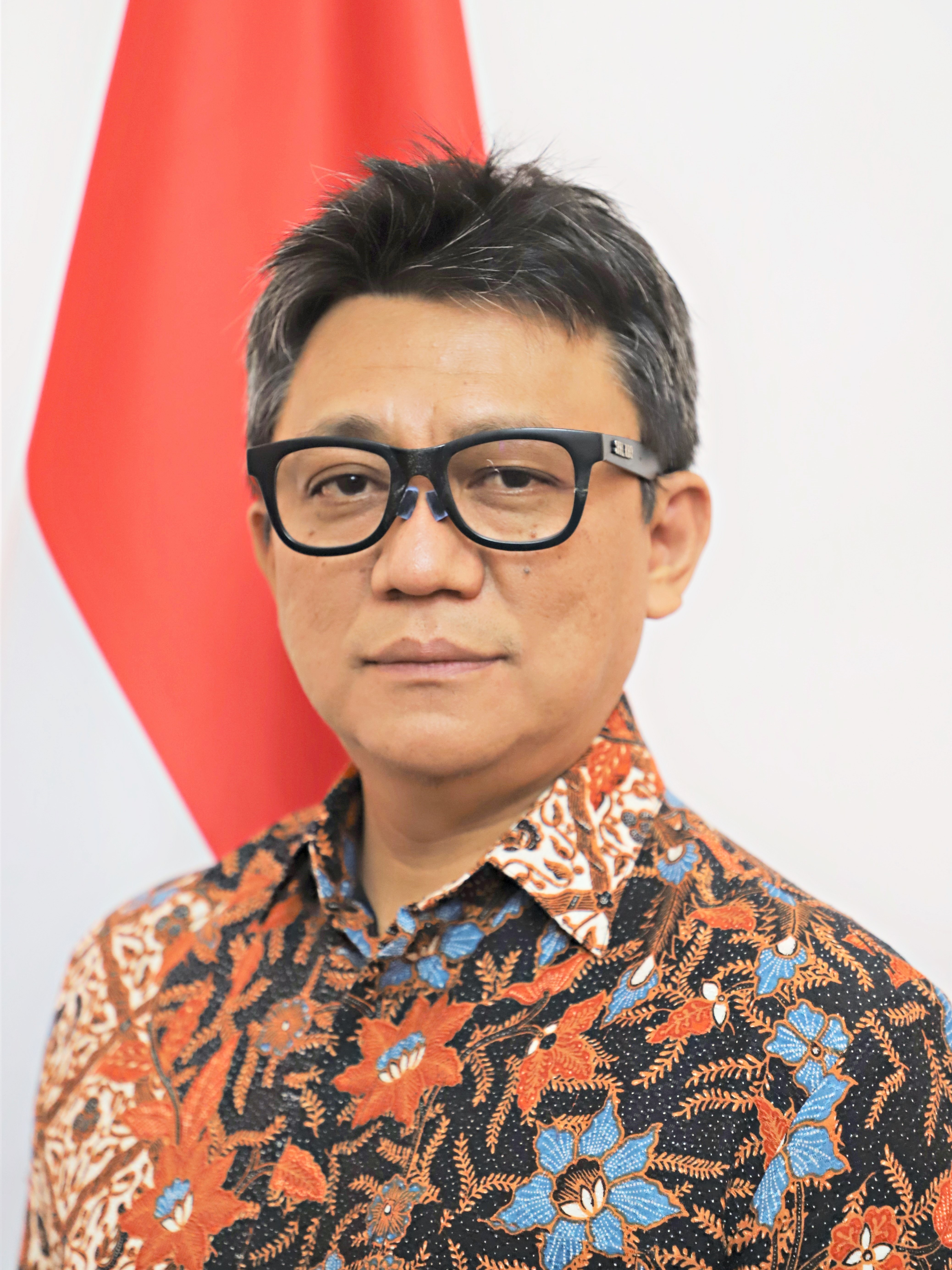

Ambassador of Indonesia to Azerbaijan
- Incumbent
- Assumed office 8 October 2025
- Preceded by: Hildi Hamid

Personal details
- Born: 21 December 1967 (age 58) Jakarta, Indonesia
- Spouse: Asri Damayanti
- Education: Parahyangan Catholic University (Drs.); Kyoto University (M.Ec.)

Berlian Helmy (born 21 December 1967) is an Indonesian diplomat who is currently serving as ambassador to Azerbaijan since 2025. Previously, he served as the director for politics and ideology at the National Resilience Institute and deputy chief of mission at the embassy in Moscow.

== Biography ==
Born on 21 December 1967 in Jakarta, Berlian began studying international relations at the Parahyangan Catholic University in 1986. Upon receiving his bachelor's degree, he joined the foreign ministry in March 1991. In 1998, he received a scholarship from the Japanese government to pursue master's studies in economics at the Kyoto University. He returned to the foreign ministry and was posted at the economics section of the embassy in Moscow with the rank of first secretary sometime between 2005 and 2006 and at the political section of the embassy in Canberra with the rank of minister-counsellor in August 2017.

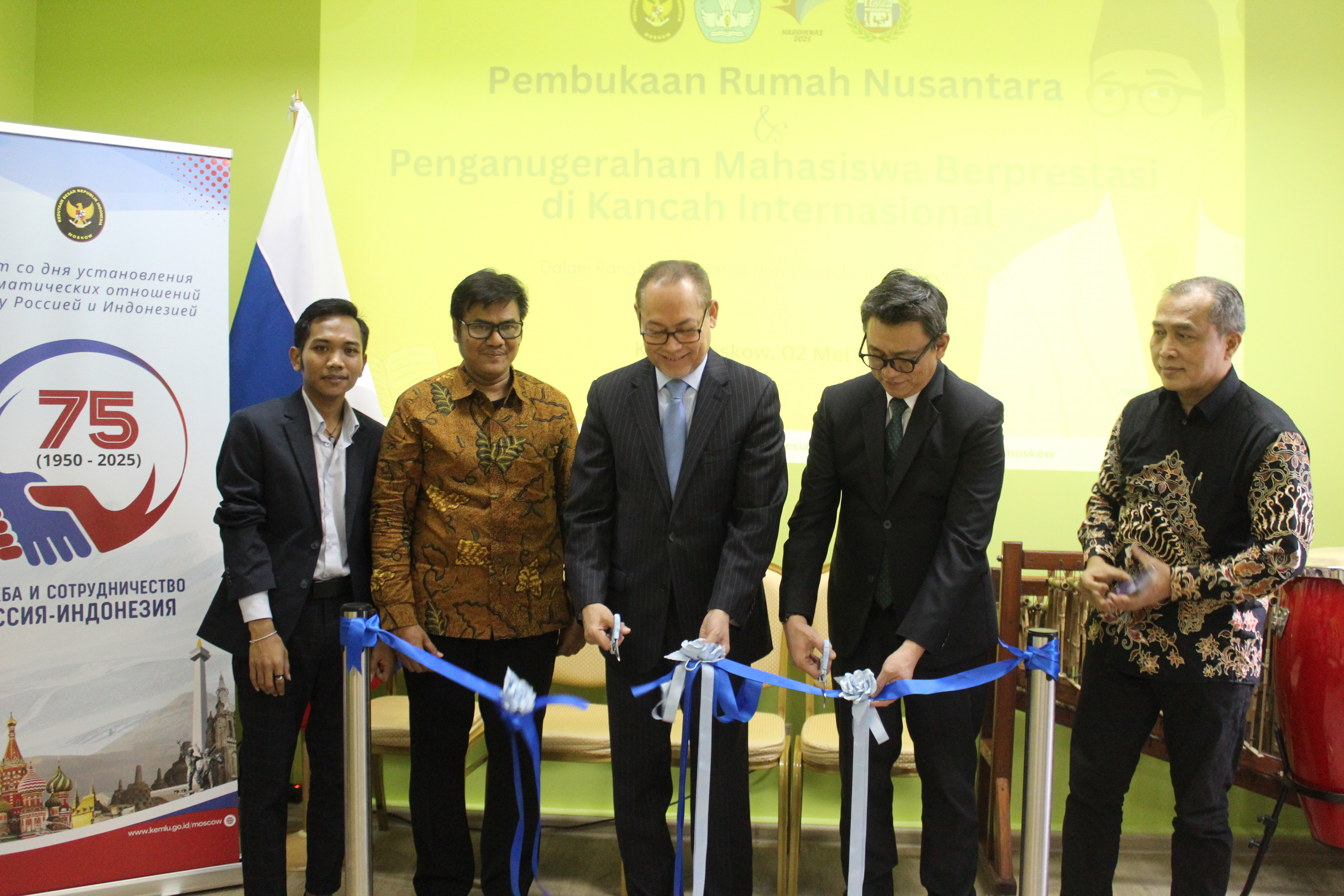
Berlian (second from right) at the inauguration of Rumah Nusantara at the Embassy of Indonesia in Moscow, 2025

In 2018, Berlian became the director for politics and ideology within the National Resilience Institute. The next year, he attended a course in the National Resilience Institute. As director, Berlian led the formulation of a book on Indonesia’s journey toward its centennial in 2045 and three possible future scenarios for Indonesia in 2035. In early 2021, Berlian became the deputy chief of mission at the embassy in Moscow. Berlian was nominated for ambassador to Azerbaijan by President Prabowo Subianto in July 2025 and was approved by the House of Representatives in a session on the 8th of that month. According to Berlian, he and the other nominated ambassadors were instructed by President Prabowo Subianto to support 8% annual national economic growth rate. He was installed as ambassador on 8 October 2025 and presented his credentials to president Ilham Aliyev on 30 January 2026.

Berlian is married to Asri Damayanti.
