= Dewi Gustina Tobing =

Indonesian diplomat (born 1964)

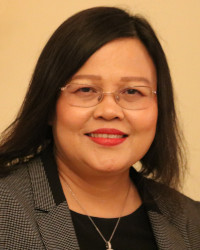

Ambassador of Indonesia to Sri Lanka and Maldives
- Incumbent
- Assumed office 25 October 2021
- President: Joko Widodo; Prabowo Subianto
- Preceded by: I Gusti Ngurah Ardiyasa

Personal details
- Born: 16 August 1964 (age 61) Pematang Siantar, North Sumatra, Indonesia
- Spouse: Bintang Pinem
- Education: Christian University of Indonesia (Drs.); Birmingham University (MBA)

Dewi Gustina Tobing (born 16 August 1964) is an Indonesian diplomat who is currently serving as ambassador to Sri Lanka, with concurrent accreditation to the Maldives since 2021. Prior to her appointment, she was the director for American and European intraregional cooperation and consul general in Perth.

== Early life ==
Born in Pematang Siantar, North Sumatra, Indonesia on 16 August 1964, Dewi studied management at the Christian University of Indonesia. Upon joining the foreign ministry, she continued her master's studies in business administration at the University of Birmingham, graduating in 1995.

== Career ==
Dewi joined the foreign ministry in 1990. On 21 January 1997, she was accredited to the economic section of the embassy in Brussels with the rank of second secretary. In 2004, she was posted to the economic and consular section of the embassy in Buenos Aires, serving with the rank of first secretary. In 2006, as the most senior official, she became the chargé d'affaires ad interim of the embassy. Around 2013, she was posted to the economic section of the embassy in Seoul with the rank of minister-counsellor. She also briefly served as the embassy's trade attache ad interim on the same year During her posting, she oversaw the 40th anniversary of Indonesia–South Korea relations.

From December 2014 to January 2018, Dewi served as the director for American and European intraregional cooperation in the foreign ministry. During her tenure, she was involved in cooperation initiatives with European stakeholders, notably through the implementation of the Indonesian Timber Legality Assurance System (SVLK), palm oil certification, and training European diplomats.

On 12 January 2018, Dewi became the consul general in Perth, replacing Ade Padmo Sarwono. She was the first woman to be appointed as Indonesia's representative in Perth. She began her duties in Perth on 25 February 2018. During her tenure, she initiated the Indonesia Festival to introduce Indonesian culture in the city.

In February 2021, Dewi was nominated as ambassador of Indonesia to France, with concurrent accreditation to Sri Lanka, with concurrent accreditation to the Maldives. After passing the House of Representatives assessment in July, she was installed on 25 October 2021. She presented her credentials to the President of Sri Lanka Gotabaya Rajapaksa on 21 December 2021 and to the President of the Maldives Ibrahim Mohamed Solih on 17 May 2022.

== Personal life ==
Dewi is married to Bintang Pinem.
