= Azis Nurwahyudi =

Indonesian diplomat (born 1969)

Ambassador of Indonesia to Colombia
- Incumbent
- Assumed office pending confirmation
- Preceded by: Tatang Budie Utama Razak

Personal details
- Born: 16 October 1969 (age 57) Magelang, Central Java, Indonesia
- Education: Gadjah Mada University (S.IP.); STIE IPWIJA (M.M.); Monash University (M.A.)

Azis Nurwahyudi (born 16 October 1969) is an Indonesian career diplomat who is currently the nominee for Indonesia's ambassador to Colombia, with concurrent accreditation to Antigua and Barbuda and Saint Kitts and Nevis. Aziz is currently the secretary of the foreign ministry's inspectorate general, serving in the position since 2022. He previously held a number of mid-level positions in the foreign ministry, including as the secretary of the directorate general of information and public diplomacy, director of public diplomacy, and the deputy chief of mission of Indonesia's embassy in Moscow.

== Early life and education ==
Azis was born on 16 October 1969 in Magelang. Inspired to become a diplomat after receiving a postcard depicting American scenery in high school, Azis began studying international relations major at the Gadjah Mada University in 1988. He graduated in 1993 with a cum laude distinction. Later in his career, Azis received his master's degree in management with a cum laude distinction from the IPWI School of Economics in 1997, and a master's degree in international relations from the Monash University in 1999.

== Diplomatic career ==
Azis was admitted to the foreign ministry in 1994 as part of the 20th cohort of the foreign ministry's basic diplomatic training. By 2002, Aziz was posted at the embassy in Canberra with the diplomatic rank of third secretary, being designated as the embassy's spokesperson. By 2007, Aziz was assigned to the embassy in Prague, where he became the coordinator for information, social, and cultural affairs with the diplomatic rank of first secretary. His portofolio was later expanded to include tourism matters, and he was promoted to the rank of counsellor a few years later. As coordinator, he was responsible for introducing the "advancements" and modern side of Indonesia. He was the embassy's chargé d'affaires for a few months in 2010 until the arrival of Emeria Wilujeng Amir Siregar. During his tenure in Prague, Azis was responsible for organizing the 50th anniversary of Czech-Indonesia relations and received an award from the Frenštát pod Radhoštěm town for his role in strengthening the city's relations with Indonesia. His portofolio was shifted to be in charge of political affairs shortly before the end of his stint in the embassy.

After his tenure in Prague concluded, Azis returned to Indonesia as the deputy director for socio-cultural affairs in the directorate of public diplomacy, where he played a role in organizing some of the directorate's initiatives to introduce Indonesia to foreign students and diplomats. From there, he was posted to the embassy in The Hague as counsellor for information, social, and cultural affairs, being promoted to minister counsellor shortly later. He was responsible for organizing Indonesia Jazz Night, where he brought Indonesian jazz musician Dwiki Dharmawan to perform. Azis received complaints from attendees, who demanded that the duration of the jazz night could be extended. He accompanied ambassador I Gusti Agung Wesaka Puja during the presentation of his credentials in 2016. He left his post in February 2017.

On 21 November 2016, Aziz became the secretary, or the chief of administration, within the directorate general of information and public diplomacy. He was reappointed and inducted to the position on 3 January 2017 following restructuring within the ministry. He was then shifted to director of public diplomacy in the same directorate general on 12 January 2018. He then became the deputy chief of mission at the embassy in Moscow. On 21 July 2022, Aziz was named as the secretary of the ministry's inspectorate general.

On 10 August 2026, Aziz was nominated by President Prabowo Subianto as ambassador to Colombia, with concurrent accreditation to Antigua and Barbuda and Saint Kitts and Nevis. He underwent a parliamentary vetting process by the House of Representative's first commission on 22 September 2026.
