= Imam As'ari =

Indonesian diplomat (born 1967)

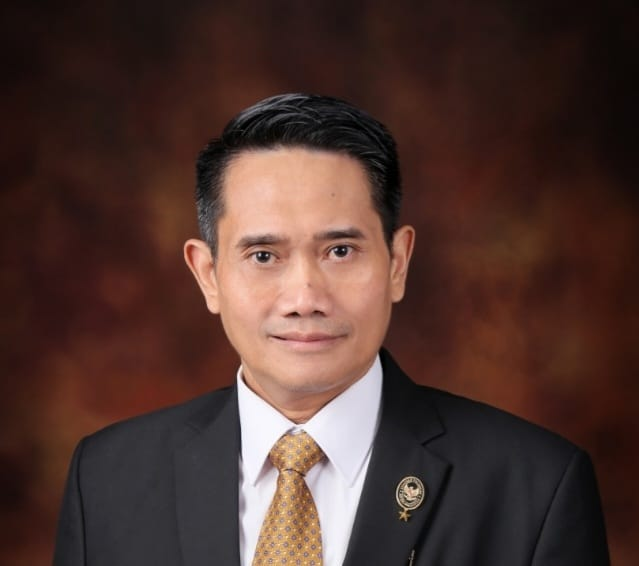

Ambassador of Indonesia to Ecuador
- Incumbent
- Assumed office 25 August 2025
- President: Prabowo Subianto
- Preceded by: Agung Kurniadi

Personal details
- Born: 25 December 1967 (age 58) Cirebon, West Java
- Spouse: Novianti As'ari
- Children: 2
- Education: Jenderal Soedirman University Netherlands Institute of International Relations Clingendael

Imam As'ari (born 25 December 1967) is an Indonesian diplomat who is serving as Ambassador to Ecuador since 2025. Previously he was Consul General in Istanbul and Special Staff for Economic and Development Coordination at the House of Representatives of the Republic of Indonesia.

== Career ==
Born in Cirebon on 25 December 1967, Imam joined the Foreign Department in March 1994. He started his overseas assignment in Abu Dhabi embassy with the rank of Third Secretary from October 1997 to February 2001. During his tenure as Head of the Consular Section at the Embassy of the Republic of Indonesia in Abu Dhabi, he established an advocacy team in cooperation with APJATI (the Association of Indonesian Manpower Service Providers) in 2000 to give advocacy of an Indonesian citizen, Kartini binti Iskandar, a migrant domestic worker from Indramayu, West Java, who had been sentenced to death by the Fujeirah Court in the UAE. As a result of these efforts, she was successfully freed from the death penalty.

After a brief stint in the Foreign Department, he was posted at the Indonesian Embassy in Port Moresby with the rank of Second Secretary on Political Affairs from December 2003 to 2004. During his assignment, he was entrusted to serve as Project Officer for the repatriation of 413 Indonesian nationals from Merauke, Papua Province, who had long been stranded and residing in Papua New Guinea for political reasons during the New Order regime.

After Port Moresby he was assigned in the Indonesian Embassy in Canberra from January 2005 to February 2008. From November 2010 to December 2014 he served at the Embassy in The Hague with the rank of Counsellor.

In March 2015, Imam became the Assistant Deputy for Europe and American affairs in the Coordinating Ministry for Politics, Law, and Security. On 12 September 2017 he was re-appointed for the same position.

He was then transferred to Istanbul as Consul General, arriving on 15 December 2019 and assuming duties a day later. His tenure in Istanbul ended on 31 March 2023. During his assignment, he was awarded the Primaduta Award from the Government of Indonesia (Ministry of Trade of the Republic of Indonesia) in 2022 for his success as Head of the Indonesian Representative in promoting national products (non-oil and gas) exports between Indonesia and Turkey. At the end of his duty, Imam returned to Jakarta to serve as advisor to the House of Representatives for economic and development coordination in 2024.

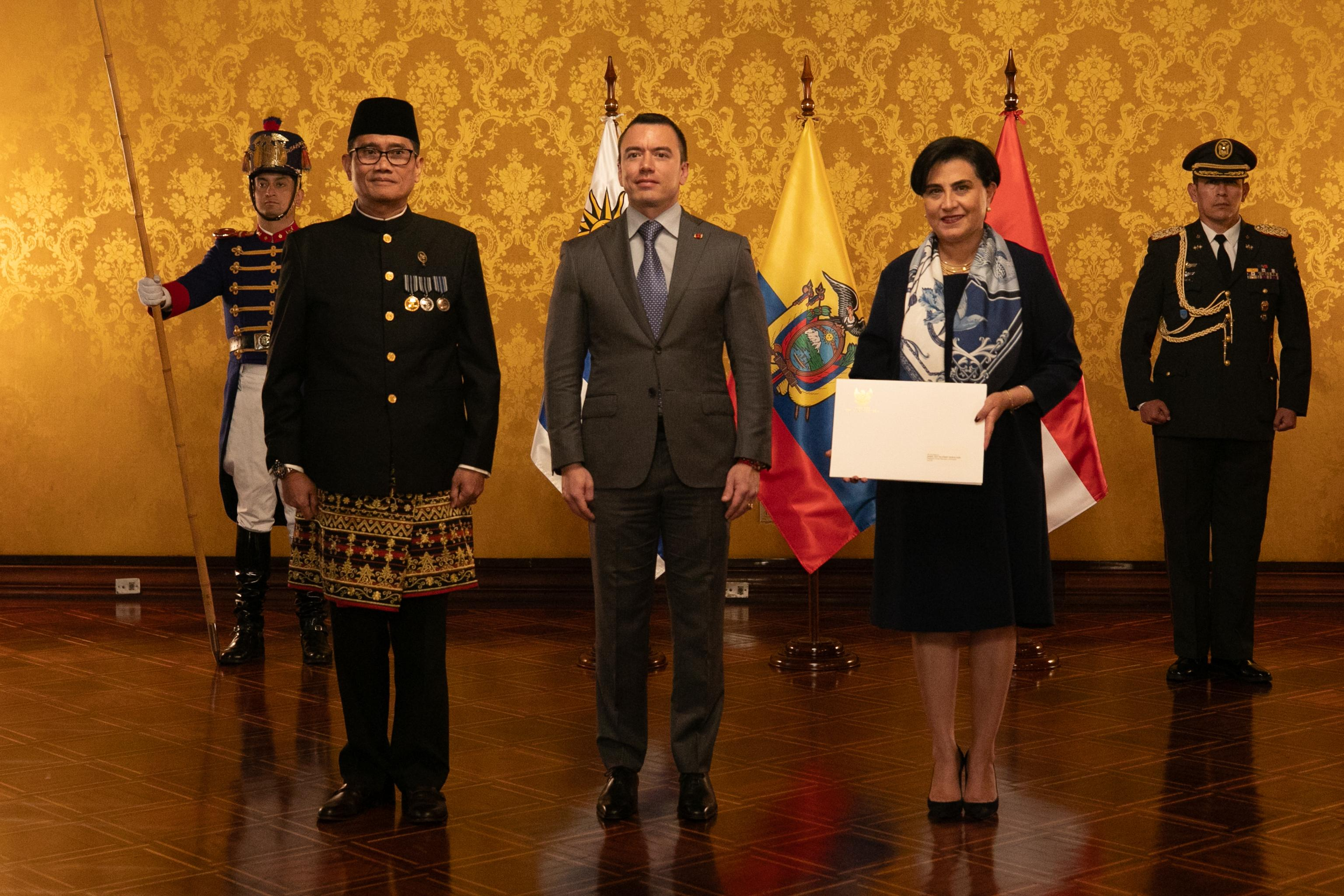
Ambassador Imam As'ari with President Noboa and Minister Gabriela Sommerfeld

Imam was nominated for Ambassador to Ecuador in July 2025. After passing fit and proper test by the House of Representative's First Commission on 6 July, his nomination was approved in a session on 8 July 2025. He was installed on 25 August 2025 and arrived in Quito on 2 January 2026. He received his duties as Ambassador from the Chargé d'affaires ad Interim Dedy Eka Januardi four days after his arrival.

On 26 January 2026, he formally presented his Letter of Credential to the President of the Republic of Ecuador, Daniel Noboa, at the Carondelet Presidential Palace in Quito, marking the official commencement of his mandate as Ambassador of the Republic of Indonesia to Ecuador. The ceremony was attended by Ecuador's Minister of Foreign Affairs and Human Mobility, Gabriela Sommerfeld.

== Personal life ==
Imam is married to Novianti As'ari and has two children, son and daughter.
