= Andi Rahadian =

Indonesian diplomat (born 1969)

Ambassador of Indonesia to Oman and Yemen
- Incumbent
- Assumed office 10 April 2026
- Preceded by: Mohamad Irzan Djohan

Personal details
- Born: 8 July 1969 (age 57)
- Spouse: Desty Triana Devi
- Children: 1
- Education: Trisakti University (S.H.); Monash University (LL.M.)

Andi Rahadian (born 8 July 1969) is an Indonesian diplomat who is serving as ambassador to Oman and Yemen since 2026. A career diplomat, Andi was seconded to the state apparatus ministry from 2019 until his ambassadorial appointment.

== Career ==
Andi was born on 8 July 1969 and began his career in the foreign ministry in March 1994. Andi received his bachelor's degree in law from the Trisakti University and a master of laws from Monash University. His first assignment overseas was at the embassy in Addis Ababa, where he interned with the rank of attaché. He was eventually promoted to the rank of third secretary, where he was in charge of information within the embassy's information and economic section. He served in the consulate general in San Francisco as consul for information and socio-cultural affairs from 13 April 2006 to February 2010. He was then assigned as a deputy director in charge of trade, economic services, investment, finance, and the environment at the foreign ministry's directorate for economic and socio-cultural agreements before being sent to the consulate in Darwin. In 2017, Andi became a deputy director within the foreign ministry.

Andi was assigned to the Ministry of State Apparatus and Bureaucratic Reform on 13 September 2019 with his appointment as the chief of legal, communication, and public information bureau. In his capacity, he was designated as the ministry's spokesperson. During the early days of the COVID-19 pandemic in Indonesia, in June 2020 Andi announced the government's policy of remote working for civil servants. After serving in the post for roughly two years, on 18 May 2021 he was installed as assistant deputy for civil service and public complaint management. He held this office until 11 January 2022, when he was transferred to the post of assistant deputy for coordination of policy implementation and evaluation of bureaucratic reform, apparatus accountability, and supervision III. His responsibilities includes ministries and agencies in human development and culture, and the provincial and municipal governments in Central Java, Yogyakarta, South Sulawesi, Central Sulawesi, West Sulawesi, Southeast Sulawesi, Gorontalo, North Sulawesi, North Maluku, Maluku, Papua, and West Papua. In October 2024, Andi led delegates from the ministry to attend OECD conference in Milan.

Andi was nominated for ambassador to Oman and Yemen by President Prabowo Subianto in July 2025. His nomination was approved by the House of Representatives in a session on 8 July 2025. He was sworn in for the position by president Prabowo Subianto on 10 April 2026 and received his duties from chargés d'affaires ad interim Heru Budiarso on 16 August 2026. He presented his credentials to Sultan Haitham bin Tariq of Oman on 10 September 2026 after handing over copies of the letter to foreign minister Badr bin Hamad Al Busaidi four days prior.

== Personal life ==
Andi is married to Desty Triana Devi and has a child.
