= Victor Sumsky =

Russian orientalist and academician

- Виктор Сумский
- Born: 13 April 1953 (age 73)
- Occupations: Academician; Researcher

Academic background
- Education: Moscow State Institute of International Relations
- Thesis: (2006)

Academic work
- Discipline: Orientalism
- Institutions: Moscow State Institute of International Relations

Victor Vladimirovich Sumsky (Russian: Виктор Владимирович Сумский; born 13 April 1953) is a Russian orientalist and academician. He is a specialist in the current history and international relations of Southeast Asia.

== Early life and education ==
Sumsky was born on 13 April 1953. His father worked at a defense research institute and was a World War II veteran, while his mother worked as chief legal adviser of the RSFSR's Ministry of Forestry. He was raised in a communal apartment in Moscow. He studied at English specialized school No.23 in Moscow and graduated in 1970. Afterwards, he entered MGIMO's Faculty of International Journalism in 1970. During his study at MGIMO, he learned Indonesian under the guidance of Ami Intoyo. While studying at MGIMO, he worked as a journalist at local newspapers in Severodvinsk and Nakhodka, respectively. He also interned at TASS and pre-graduation practical training at Novoye Vremya. He finished his study at MGIMO in 1975.

In 1979, upon returning to the Soviet Union, he continued his postgraduate education at the Institute of Oriental Studies. He wrote a dissertation about comparing the contemporary political development and official ideologies of two Asian countries. After defending his dissertation, he published it titled Nationalism and Authoritarianism: Political and Ideological Processes in Indonesia, Pakistan, and Bangladesh. Sumsky defended his doctoral dissertation on the Philippines' political regime development in 2006.

== Career ==
Upon graduating from MGIMO, Sumsky had a plan to enroll in the postgraduate program at the Institute of Oriental Studies of the Russian Academy of Sciences. However, he dropped his postgraduate plan after getting a job offer from the Ministry of Foreign Affairs. The ministry posted Sumsky in the Soviet Union Consulate General in Medan, and he worked there for four years (1975–1979). Working at the Soviet Union Consulate General, he was tasked with preparing reference and informational materials, managing property rights for the consulate general's house, and becoming an interpreter for Soviet compatriots and their families.

Upon finishing his postgraduate, Sumsky worked at the Institute of Oriental Studies. In 1988, he joined IMEMO. When he worked at IMEMO, he also became a visiting professor at the University of the Philippines, the London School of Economics and Political Science, and Washington State University. Moreover, he also represented Russia at the Council of the European Association for Southeast Asian Studies (EuroSEAS) and is a member of the Russian National Committee of the Council for Security Cooperation in the Asia Pacific.

In June 2010, Sumsky was appointed as the Director of the ASEAN Center at MGIMO, a position that he served until 2021 when he was replaced by Ekaterina Koldunova. In August 2010, the Embassy of Indonesia in Moscow awarded a commemorative badge in August for his contribution on developing Indonesia-Russia diplomatic relations. Sumsky joined the PIR Center's advisory board and the Trialogue International Club in 2012.

== Personal life ==
Sumsky is married and has a daughter. He speaks Russian, English, and Indonesian.

== Works ==
=== Books ===
- Sumsky (1987) Nationalism and Authoritarianism: Political and Ideological Processes in Indonesia, Pakistan, and Bangladesh (Национализм и авторитаризм. Политико-идеологические процессы в Индонезии, Пакистане и Бангладеш)
- Sumsky (2002) Ferdinand Marcos: The Emergence, Evolution, and Decline of a Dictatorship in the Philippines (Фердинанд Маркос. Зарождение, эволюция и упадок диктатуры на Филиппинах)
- Sumsky (2003) Fiesta Filipina: Reforms, Revolutions, and Active Non-Violence in a Developing Society (Фиеста Филипина. Реформы, революции и активное ненасилие в развивающемся обществе)

=== Book Chapters ===
- Sumsky (2004) ASEAN and East Asia (АСЕАН и Восточная Азия). In Chufrin, Gennady East Asia: Between Regionalism and Globalism (Восточная Азия между регионализмом и глобализмом). Moscow.
- Sumsky (2006) Southeast Asian Security Challenges: A View from Russia. In Chufrin, Gennady; Honh, Mark; Beng, Teo Kah ASEAN — Russia Relations. Singapore.
- Sumsky (2006) ASEAN and East Asia. In Chufrin, Gennady East Asia: Between Regionalism and Globalism. Singapore.
- Sumsky (2007) China’s “Peace Offensive” in Southeast Asia (Мирное наступление» Китая в Юго-Восточной Азии). In Chufrin, Gennady China in the 21st Century: Globalization of Security Interests (Китай в ХХI веке: глобализация интересов безопасности. Moscow.
- Sumsky (2007) China’s Peace Offensive in Southeast Asia and Russia’s Regional Priorities. In Chufrin, Gennady; Honh, Mark; Russia–ASEAN Relations: New Directions. Singapore.
- Sumsky (2008) Southeast Asia in the Context of Russian National Interests. In Datta, Sreeradha Changing Security Dynamics in Southeast Asia. New Delhi.
- Sumsky (2008) ASEAN at Its Fortieth Anniversary Crossroads (АСЕАН на рубеже сорокалетия). In North – South – Russia 2007 Yearbook (Север—Юг—Россия). Moscow.
- Sumsky (2009) Russia and ASEAN Ahead of Their Second Summit (Россия и АСЕАН накануне своего второго саммита). In Sumsky, V.V; Khoros, V.G. Moscow The World Crisis and “Center–Periphery” Relations in the Modern Era (Мировой кризис и отношения «Центр – Периферия» на современном этапе).
- Sumsky (2010) Why Pancasila May Look Irrelevant Today — and Why It May Not. In Pancasila’s Contemporary Appeal: Re-legitimizing Indonesia’s Founding Ethos. Yogyakarta.

=== Journals ===
- Sumsky, V (2005). "Юго-Восточная Азия в холодной войне и глобализирующемся мире". Мировая экономика и международные отношения (4): 60–67.
- Sumsky, V (2007). "America in East Asia: The Rise and the Waning of a Benevolent Hegemon Image". The Japanese Journal of American Studies. 18.
- Sumsky, V (2008). "The Art of the Possible in ASEAN's Future". Global Asia. 3 (1): 90–100.
- Sumsky, V (2009). "Генерал Сухарто и темная страница индонезийской истории". Международная жизнь (8): 60–67.
- Sumsky, V (2009). "General Suharto and the Murky Chapter of Indonesian History". International Affairs. 55 (6).
- Sumsky, V (2010). "Модернизация России, геополитика Восточной Азии и фактор АСЕАН". Международная жизнь (10).
- Sumsky, V (2011). "Почему нас не было в ВАС и почему теперь нас туда зовут". ндекс безопасности (2): 37–44.

== Awards ==
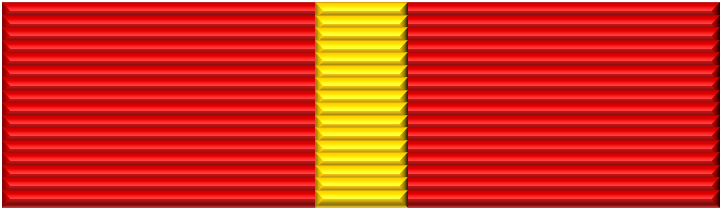
- Medal of Friendship Order (Vietnam) - 2014.
- 2nd Class of Medal of the Order "For Merit to the Fatherland" - 2016.
