= Irene (diplomat) =

Indonesian politician (born 1985)

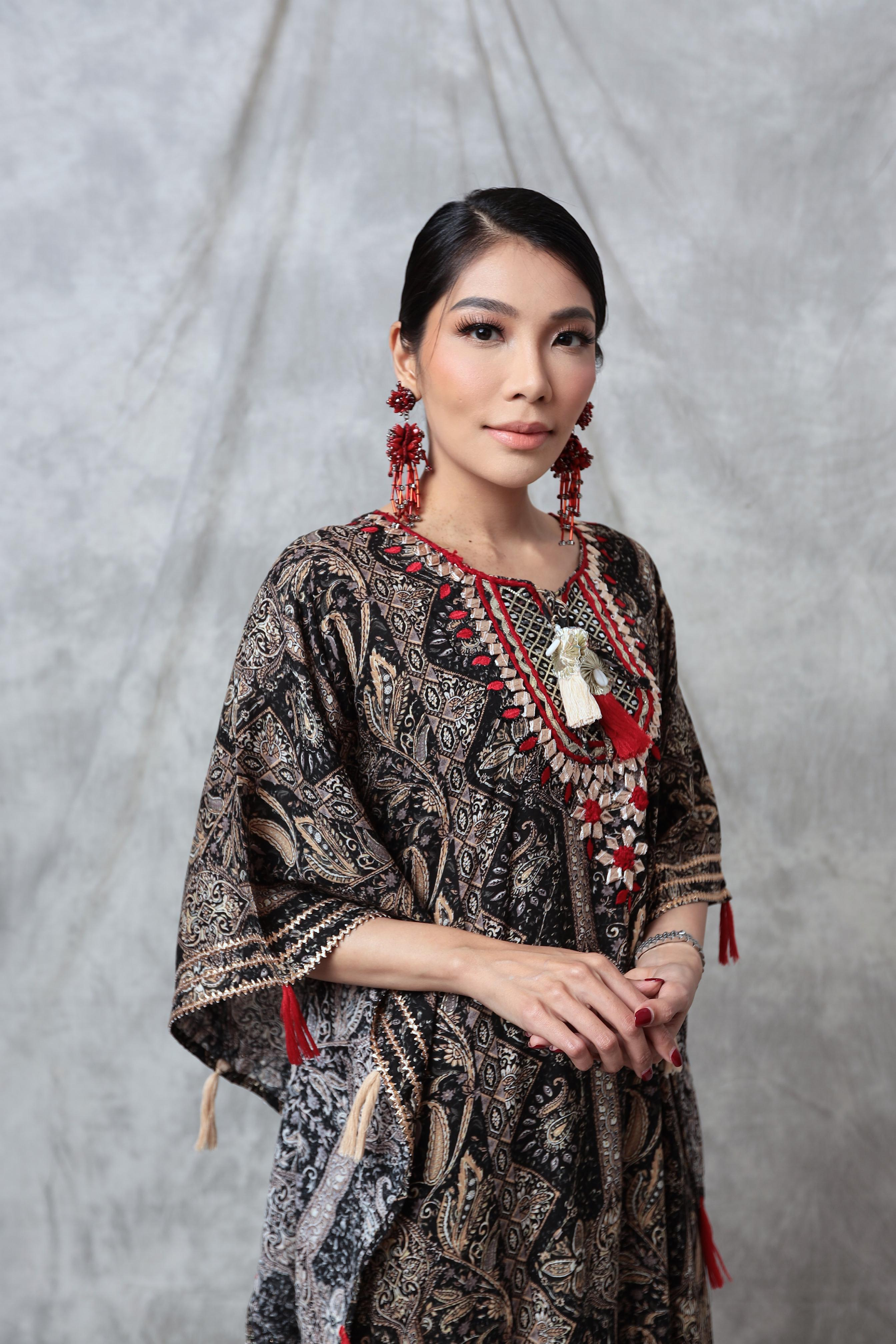
- Irene in 2025

Deputy Ambassador of Indonesia to China
- Incumbent
- Assumed office 8 October 2025
- President: Prabowo Subianto
- Ambassador: Djauhari Oratmangun
- Preceded by: Parulian George Andreas Silalahi

Personal details
- Born: July 13, 1985 (age 40) Jayapura, Irian Jaya, Indonesia
- Party: Gerindra
- Education: University of Indonesia (dr.); Indonesian Defense University (M.Han.)

Irene (born 13 July 1985) is an Indonesian physician, socialite, politician, and diplomat who is Indonesia's deputy ambassador to China since 2025.

== Early life and education ==
Irene was born in Jayapura on 13 July 1985, whose interest in fauna and preservation was sparked by her mother, a member of the Papua People's Representative Council, and her uncle, the director of Faunaland, a mini zoo and conservation-focused theme park located in the Ecopark area of Ancol. She studied medicine at the University of Indonesia from 2004 and graduated in 2011. She gained a master's degree in defense diplomacy at the Indonesian Defense University, graduating in 2024.

== Career and social life ==
Irene was a socialite and a member of the Girls Squad, an association that included celebrities like Jessica Iskandar, Nia Ramadhani, and Jennifer Bachdim. She was also the sole Indonesian invited to attend the wedding reception of Anant Ambani and Radhika Merchant, the son of Asia's wealthiest man Mukesh Ambani, where she wore a kebaya designed by Anaz Khairunnas.

== Political career ==
Irene has maintained connections with Prabowo Subianto, then-chairman of the Gerindra Party, since late 2012 through her mother. In the 2019 Indonesian general election, Irene ran as a candidate for the House of Representatives from the Gerindra Party, representing the Papua electoral district. She received 6,573 votes in the election and did not pass for a seat in the house. In the next 2024 Indonesian general election, Irene joined Fanta, the youth wing of Prabowo Subianto's presidential campaign team as deputy chair. She also ran, for the same party, for the House of Representatives. The party failed to pass the minimum vote threshold for a seat in the province.

On 8 October 2025, Irene was installed as the deputy ambassador to China by President Prabowo Subianto. Irene, who was the first deputy ambassador to be installed directly by the president, was planned to be posted in Chengdu. Foreign Minister Sugiono explained the appointment was crucial due to China's vast size and heavy workload, noting that Indonesia plans to open a new consulate general in Chengdu. Sugiono's deputy, Arrmanatha Nasir, stated that Irene was given a special assignment by the President as deputy ambassador. International relations expert Ardhitya Eduard Yeremia Lalisang argued that Irene’s role is more suited to be referred to as a presidential special staffer rather than a deputy ambassador and that Indonesia must clearly explain this appointment to other partner countries to avoid misinterpretation, especially amid tensions between United States and China.
