= Shantanu Srivastava =

Indian entrepreneur

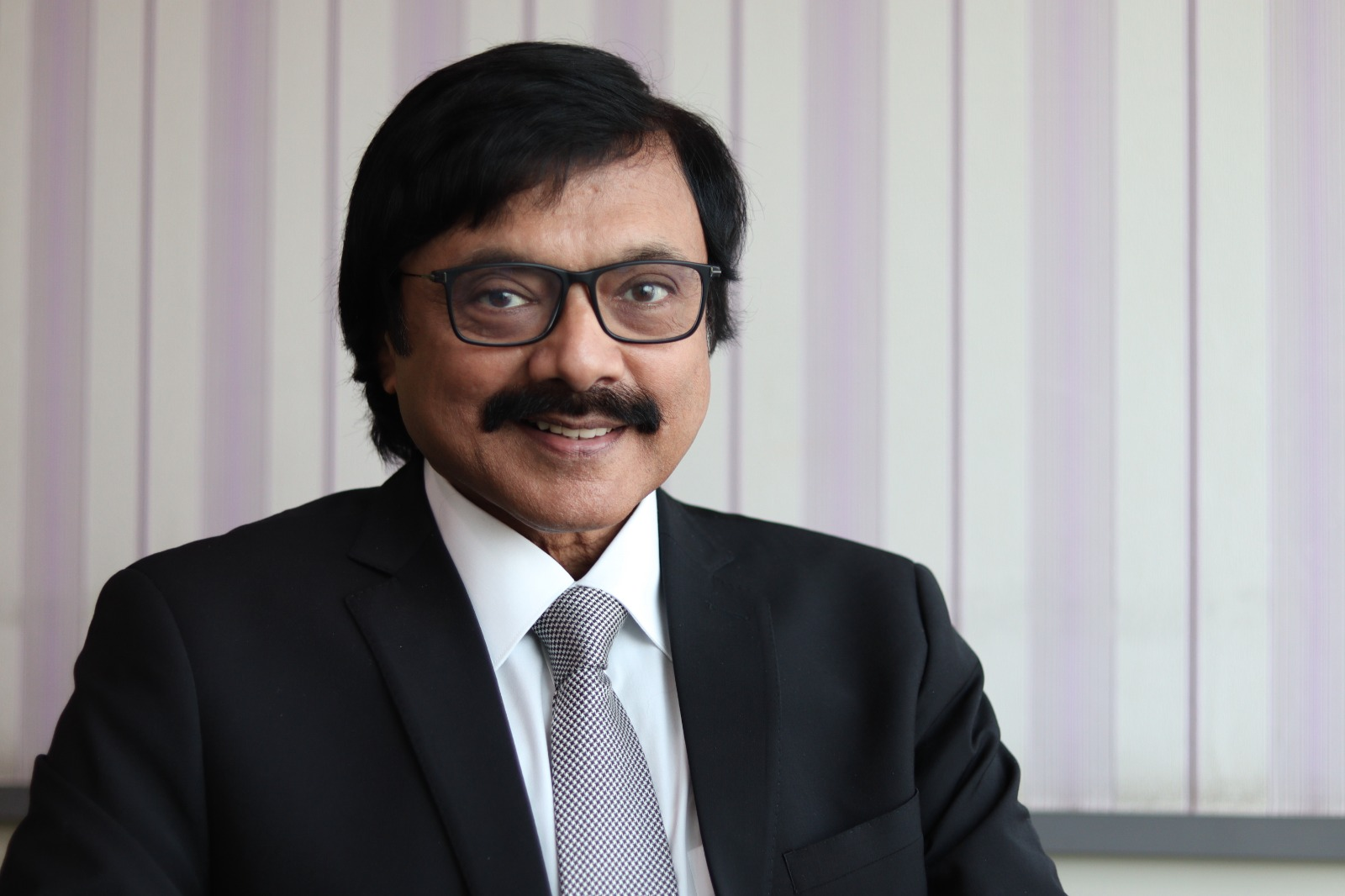
- Born: Allahabad
- Education: IIT Kanpur
- Awards: Friendship order of Vietnam; Distinguished Alumnus Award from IIT Kanpur; Pride of Place amongst two ex-Prime Ministers of India in the book published by the Vietnam Union of Friendship Organizations listing best friends of Vietnam

Shantanu Srivastava is an Indian entrepreneur and promoter, MD and CEO of Ishan International Limited. He is also the founder and ex-Chairman of Indian Business Chamber in Vietnam. He is the former chairman of India-ASEAN Business Promotion Council of ASSOCHAM. and is known for his contributions to the promotion of India-Vietnam business relations. Srivastava is the alumnus of IIT Kanpur.

== Early life and career ==
Shantanu Srivastava was born in Allahabad, Uttar Pradesh. He did his schooling from Aligarh followed by B.Tech. (Mechanical) from IIT Kanpur.

Shantanu Srivastava was sent on deputation as a diplomat to the Indian Embassy in Hanoi, Vietnam. He started his business from Vietnam after completion of his posting at the Indian embassy. Shantanu chose to stay in the South-East Asian country, which he calls his second home, until moving back to India in 2004. He founded the Indian Business Chamber in Vietnam in 1999. Since then the bilateral trade between the two countries has risen from 100 million dollars to over 12 billion dollars.

Shantanu started business with limited resources and over the past three decades he has diversified his business to Engineering Goods, Turnkey Projects, Agriculture and Entertainment.

In 2006, Government of Vietnam published a list of 500 friends of Vietnam. There are three Indians named in the book Prime Minister Jawaharlal Nehru, Prime Minister Indira Gandhi and Shantanu Srivastava.

Shantanu has published a book called $852 to motivate budding entrepreneurs in India. The book was released in Varanasi by the then Governor of the State of Uttar Pradesh and Vice Chancellor of Banaras Hindu University.

Srivastava is the convenor of MSME for 2047 which is a private national level platform for MSME to play pivotal role in making Viksit Bharat by 2047 which is the vision of Prime Minister of India Shri Narendra Modi. It is a Structured Mission to accelerate MSME growth to 15% per annum making it a central pillar in Bharat’s journey towards becoming a developed nation by 2047.

== In popular culture ==
A book was released on "Shantanu's 30 Years Relationship of Love, Respect, and Cooperation with Vietnam," in 2013 which was published by the Vietnam Union of Friendship Organisation (VUFO) and was released by VUFO along with the then Ambassador of India. The book focuses on Shantanu's contributions to strengthening friendship and cooperation between the two countries.

== Philanthropy ==
Shantanu Srivastava participated in social work in Vietnam and subsequently in India. He raised funds to construct houses for the needy in Ho Chi Minh City's Can Gio area, helped poor students and Saigon Tennis Federation during the early part of his stay in Vietnam. In addition, with the provision of machinery and the creation of a textile-dyeing laboratory, he has contributed to the development of Vietnam's railway, textile, and tea industries.

== Awards and recognition ==
- Friendship order of Vietnam
- Distinguished Alumnus Awardees (DAA) IIT Kanpur 2009. Voted amongst Top 50 Alumni of IIT Kanpur during Golden Jubilee celebrations.
- In 2006, Government of Vietnam published a list of 500 friends of Vietnam. There are three Indians Jawaharlal Nehru, Indira Gandhi and Shantanu Srivastava.
