= Wahid Supriyadi =

Indonesian diplomat (born 1959)

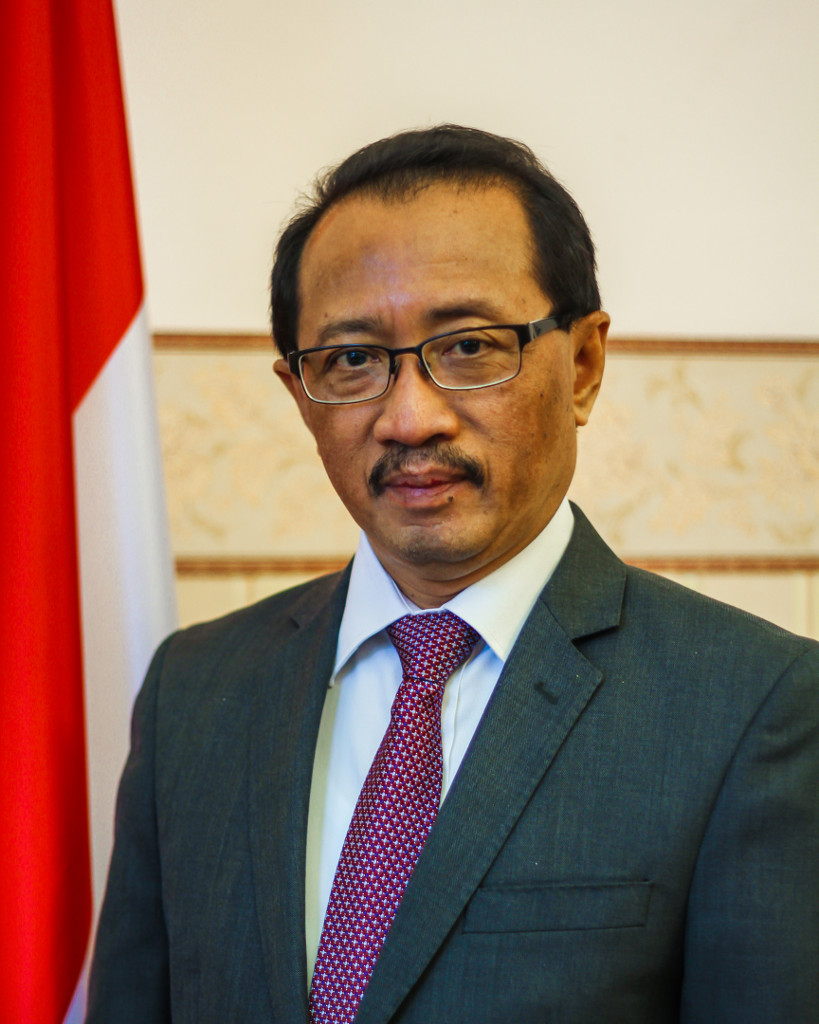
- Wahid Supriyadi in 2017

Ambassador of Indonesia to Russia and Belarus
- In office 2016–2020
- President: Joko Widodo
- Preceded by: Djauhari Oratmangun
- Succeeded by: Jose Antonio Morato Tavares

Ambassador of Indonesia to the United Arab Emirates
- In office 8 April 2008 – 30 November 2011
- President: Susilo Bambang Yudhoyono
- Preceded by: Faisal Bafadal
- Succeeded by: Salman Al Farisi

Personal details
- Born: 18 August 1959 (age 67) Winong, Kebumen, Indonesia
- Spouse: Murgiyati Supriyadi
- Children: 3
- Education: Gadjah Mada University; Swinburne University of Technology
- Profession: Diplomat

Mohamad Wahid Supriyadi (born 18 August 1959) is an Indonesian diplomat who served as an Ambassador to Russia (2016–2020) and Ambassador to the United Arab Emirates (2008–2011).

== Early life and education ==
Wahid was born in Winong, Kebumen on 18 August 1959. His father was a teacher. During his childhood, he had an ambition to become a dalang (puppeteer) because of his passion for watching wayang (traditional puppet theatre). He enrolled in private junior high school in Prembun and later on the SMA Negeri 1 Purworejo (State Senior High School 1 Purworejo), taking language stream and graduating in 1977. He studied English literature at Gadjah Mada University and earned a B.A. degree in 1983. Later, he took Applied Business major at Swinburne University of Technology and graduated in 2000.

== Teaching career ==
Wahid commenced his teaching career by becoming an English teacher at a cram school when he was a student at Gadjah Mada. Through this work, he could pay his university tuition and assist his three little brothers and sisters. He then worked as an English teacher at Muhammadiyah II High School in Yogyakarta from 1981 to 1984. Afterward, he worked as an English lecturer at Pancasila University for five years (1984–1989).

== Diplomatic career ==
Wahid joined Indonesia's foreign service in 1985 after passing the selection test. He took an Information and Public Relations Course for five months in 1988. Wahid was sent to Canberra in 1989 and served as the Third Secretary of the Information, Social, and Cultural section of the Embassy of the Republic of Indonesia in Canberra until 1993. In 1995, he was assigned as the Young Consul at the Consulate General of Indonesia in Melbourne for four years.

In 2001, Wahid became acting spokesperson of Indonesia's Department of Foreign Affairs and acting director for Foreign Information. From 2002 to 2004, Wahid served as the Director of Information and Media. In 2004, he was appointed as the Consul General of Indonesia's Consulate General in Melbourne and served until 2007. When he served as consul general in Melbourne, the consulate general organized an annual event called the Indonesian Festival. He worked as an acting General Director of America and Europe in 2012 for three months, from April to July. In the same year, he also became one of Indonesia's delegates at APEC Russia 2012 in Vladivostok. Apart from that, he also served in other positions in the Ministry of Foreign Affairs, such as Head of the Indonesian Diaspora Desk and Expert Staff of the Minister of Foreign Affairs for Economic, Social and Cultural Affairs. He also participated in the Diaspora Congress by becoming the chairman of the first and second congresses. During the 2014 Indonesian legislative election and 2014 Indonesian presidential election, Wahid became Head of the Overseas Election Committee Working Group.

When he was posted abroad, Wahid always utilized a cultural diplomacy approach since he believed that culture was Indonesia's most powerful force.

=== Ambassador to the United Arab Emirates ===
He became the Ambassador to the United Arab Emirates on 8 April 2008. On 17 August 2011, on the 66th anniversary of Indonesia's independence, he gave T-shirts, female magazines, and 100 AED to 29 Indonesian female worker detainees in Al Wathba Prison. He stepped down as ambassador to the UAE in 2011.

=== Ambassador to Russia ===
Wahid was appointed as the Ambassador to Russia, replacing Djauhari Oratmangun in 2016. He sent credential letters to Vladimir Putin on 20 April 2016. Under his tenure, the Embassy of Indonesia in Moscow held the Indonesia festival four times consecutively from 2016 to 2019. In 2019, the embassy held the largest Indonesia Festival in Krasnaya Pesnya Park near the White House. The 2019 festival was attended by 150.000 people. As a result, he got an award from MURI on 5 August 2019. Furthermore, he also inaugurated the Nusantara Center of Dagestan Humanitarian and Pedagogical College on 26 March 2019. He ended his tenure in 2020 and the position was replaced by Jose Antonio Morato Tavares.

== Post-diplomatic life ==
Wahid authored a book titled Diplomasi Ringan dan Lucu, describing his unique experiences as a diplomat in Australia, United Arab Emirates, and Russia. The book was released on 21 November 2020.

== Personal life ==
Wahid is married to Murgiyati Supriyadi and has three children.

== Awards and Titles ==
- Honorary Professor – Tomsk State University (17 August 2018).
- Visiting professor of International Relations – Tomsk State University (6 September 2018).
- Medal of Muslims of Russia For Services – Russian Council of Muftis (29 July 2020).

== Writings ==
- Diplomasi Ringan dan Lucu (Indonesian)

== Bibliography ==
- APEC (December 2012). Moderators and Speakers Biographies Submitted by: Indonesia (PDF) (Report).
