= Jose Antonio Morato Tavares =

Indonesian diplomat (born 1960)

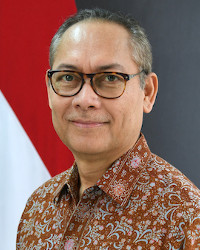

Ambassador of Indonesia to Russia and Belarus
- Incumbent
- Assumed office 26 October 2020
- President: Joko Widodo; Prabowo Subianto
- Preceded by: Wahid Supriyadi

Director General for ASEAN Cooperation
- In office 23 May 2016 – 27 October 2020
- President: Joko Widodo
- Preceded by: I Gusti Agung Wesaka Puja
- Succeeded by: Sidharto Reza Suryodipuro

Ambassador of Indonesia to New Zealand, Samoa, and Tonga
- In office 24 December 2013 – 2016
- President: Susilo Bambang Yudhoyono; Joko Widodo
- Preceded by: Antonius Agus Sriyono
- Succeeded by: Tantowi Yahya

Personal details
- Born: 16 September 1960 (age 66) Balibo, Portuguese Timor
- Spouse: Fitria Wibowo
- Parent: João da Costa Tavares (father)
- Education: Padjadjaran University; Murdoch University
- Profession: Diplomat

Jose Antonio Morato Tavares (born 16 September 1960), often written Jose Tavares, is an Indonesian diplomat who has been serving as the Ambassador of Indonesia to Russia and Belarus since 26 October 2020. He was previously Ambassador of Indonesia to New Zealand (along with Samoa and Tonga) between 2013 and 2016. Originating from East Timor and moving to West Timor upon the outbreak of the East Timorese civil war, he joined Indonesia's foreign service in 1987.

== Early life and education ==
Tavares was born in Balibo on 16 September 1960. His father, João da Costa Tavares, worked at the government. He was the first child of nine siblings. When Carnation Revolution occurred, he was a high school student in Dili. In 1975, a civil war broke out in East Timor, prompting him and his family to seek refuge in Atambua.

As Tavares and his family arrived in Atambua, they stayed in their relative's house and depended on the generous people for their survival. From 1975 to 1976, he did not go to school because he could not speak Indonesian. Afterwards, he moved to Bandung to continue his high school.

Upon finishing high school, Tavares enrolled at the Faculty of Social and Political Sciences at Padjadjaran University. When he studied at Padjadjaran, he improved his English skills. Later, he studied at Murdoch University after obtaining an Australian government scholarship from 1990 to 1992. He studied development studies (1990-1991) and he studied M.A. public policy (1991-1992). While in Australia, he recalled that he studied up to 16 hours every day, even in the toilet.

Apart from formal education, Tavares also participated in courses such as summer school on the European Union's Foreign and Security Policy in 1996, UNITAR Fellowship Programme in Peacemaking and Preventive Diplomacy in Vienna in 1998, and WIPO's training in Intellectual Property Rights in 2009.

== Diplomatic career ==
Tavares joined the foreign service in 1987 through the selective recruitment, where out of 7000 applicants, only 52 were accepted, including him. In 1993, he was posted at the Mission of the Republic of Indonesia to the European Community in Brussels until 1997. Later, he returned to Indonesia and headed the Political Affairs Section at the International Organizations Directorate from 1997 to 1999. Meanwhile, he also led the pro-integration delegation at the All-inclusive Intra East Timorese Dialogue in Schloss Krumbach from 31 October to 1 November 1998.

In 2000, he moved to Paris and served as the Deputy Chief of Indonesia’s Mission to UNESCO for four years. Afterwards, in 2007, he was posted in Geneva as a representative of the Permanent Mission of Indonesia to the United Nations, responsible for peace and security and disarmament. Tavares was assigned as the Director for Dialogue Partners and Inter-Regional Affairs of ASEAN from May 2010 until early 2012 and subsequently as the Director for ASEAN Political and Security Cooperation from 2012 to December 2013. In 2016, he returned to Indonesia and became the Director General of ASEAN Cooperation from 2016 to 2020.

=== Ambassador to New Zealand ===
Yudhoyono appointed Tavares as the Ambassador of Indonesia to New Zealand, Samoa, and Tonga on 24 December 2013. He presented his credential letters to Jerry Mateparae on 12 March 2014. He served as Ambassador to New Zealand, Samoa, and Tonga until 2016.

=== Ambassador to Russia ===
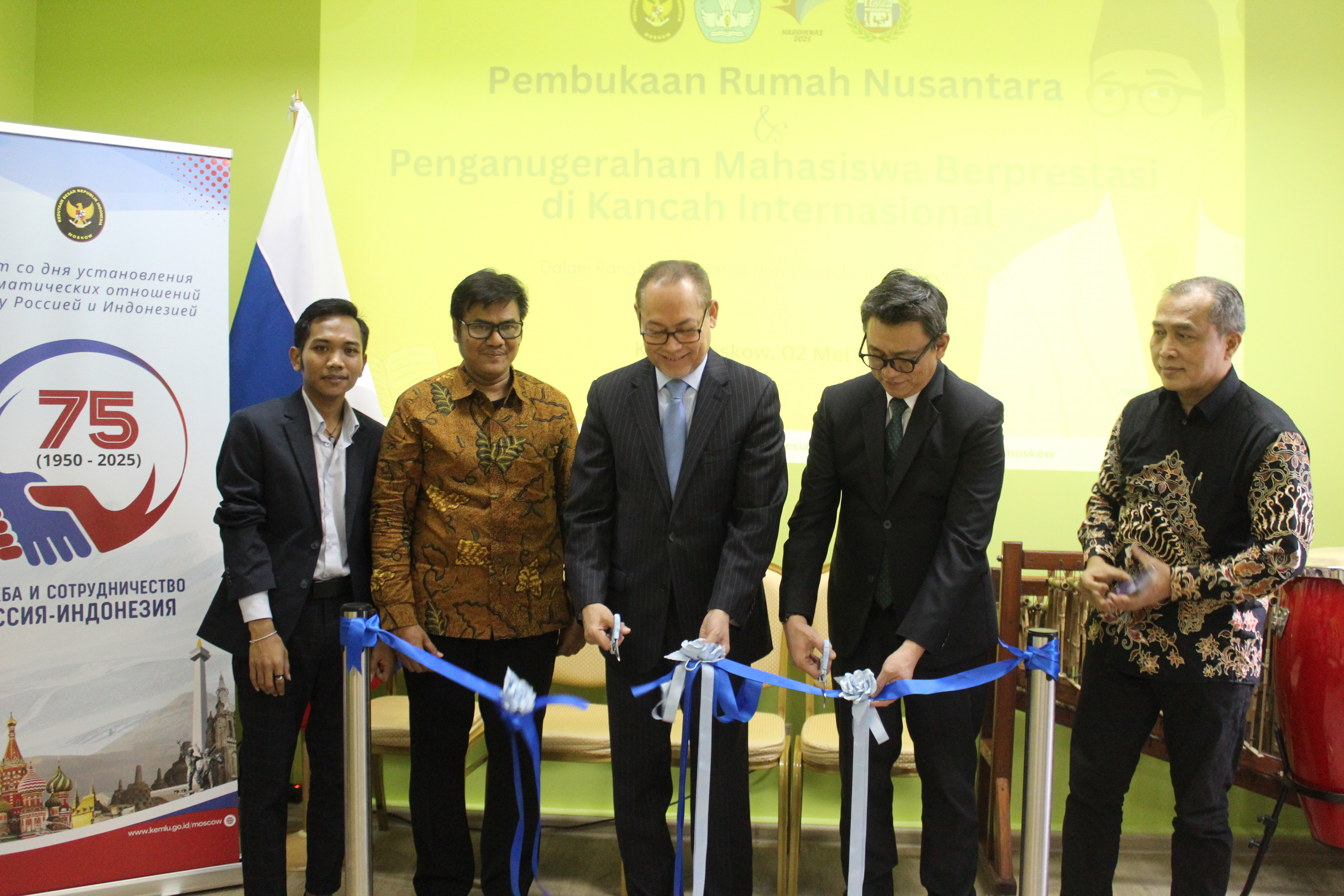
Jose Antonio Morato Tavares (center) inaugurated Rumah Nusantara in Embassy of Indonesia in Moscow on 2 May 2025

Jokowi inaugurated Tavares as the Ambassador of Indonesia to Russia and Belarus in Istana Negara on 26 October 2020. He arrived in Moscow on 13 December 2020. He presented credential letters to Putin on 18 May 2021. Four months later, on 30 September, he send credential letters to Lukashenko.

Under his tenure, Tavares inaugurated the Indonesian cultural center, Rumah Nusantara, on 4 May 2025 at the Embassy of Indonesia in Moscow. Other than that, the Embassy of Indonesia held batik exhibition and promotion in the All-Russian Decorative Art Museum on 3 October 2021.

== Personal life ==
Tavares is a Catholic. He married a daughter of his superior in the foreign ministry, deputy foreign minister Triyono Wibowo, Fitria Wibowo in 2012 in Bangkok.
