= Friendship Order =

Friendship Order Huân chương Hữu nghị
- Type: Single-grade order
- Awarded for: Foreigners and collectives of foreigners that have made great contributions to building, consolidating and developing the friendship between Vietnam and other countries in the world.
- Presented by: the Government of Vietnam
- Eligibility: Foreigners
- Status: Currently awarded
- Established: 26 November 2003

Precedence
- Next (higher): Bravery Order
- Next (lower): none

The Friendship Order (Vietnamese: Huân chương Hữu nghị) is a service award conferred by the Government of Vietnam for "foreigners and on collectives of foreigners who have made great contributions to building, consolidating and developing the friendship between Vietnam and other countries in the world."

== Criteria ==
The Friendship Order shall be conferred or posthumously conferred on foreigners and foreign organizations meet the following criteria:

- A spirit of solidarity and friendship, mutual respect for sovereignty, laws and customs of Vietnam.
- There are important contributions to the construction and economic development - social, security and defense of Vietnam, has many merits in strengthening and developing relations of friendship and good cooperation on the politics, economics, defense, security, diplomatic, scientific, technological, environmental protection, culture and society between Vietnam and other countries and regional and inter-regional foreign institutions, international organizations.

== Recipients ==
- Saber Hossain Chowdhury
- Vojtěch Filip, chairman of the Communist Party of Bohemia and Moravia
- Chelyabinsk Tractor Plant, 2003
- Carlo Urbani, Italian Doctor, 2003, for identifying severe acute respiratory syndrome (SARS) and issuing an early warning to the World Health Organization
- Asian Institute of Technology, 2006
- Subinay Nandy, Deputy Resident Representative, United Nations Development Programme (UNDP), 2007
- Minister of Foreign Affairs of the Russian Federation Sergey Lavrov (25 July 2009)
- Victor Sumsky, Russian orientalist, 2014.
- Dr Joël Leroy, Surgeon, 2017
- Coach Park Hang-seo, 2018
- Chinese Ambassador Hong Xiaoyong, 2018
- Italian Ambassador Cecilia Piccioni, 2018
- German journalist Hellmut Kapfenberger, 2020
- Minister of Defence of the Russian Federation Sergei Shoigu (2 December 2021)
- John Paul Pullicino, 2022

== See also ==
- Vietnam awards and decorations
