= Sidharto Reza Suryodipuro =

Indonesian diplomat (born 1966)

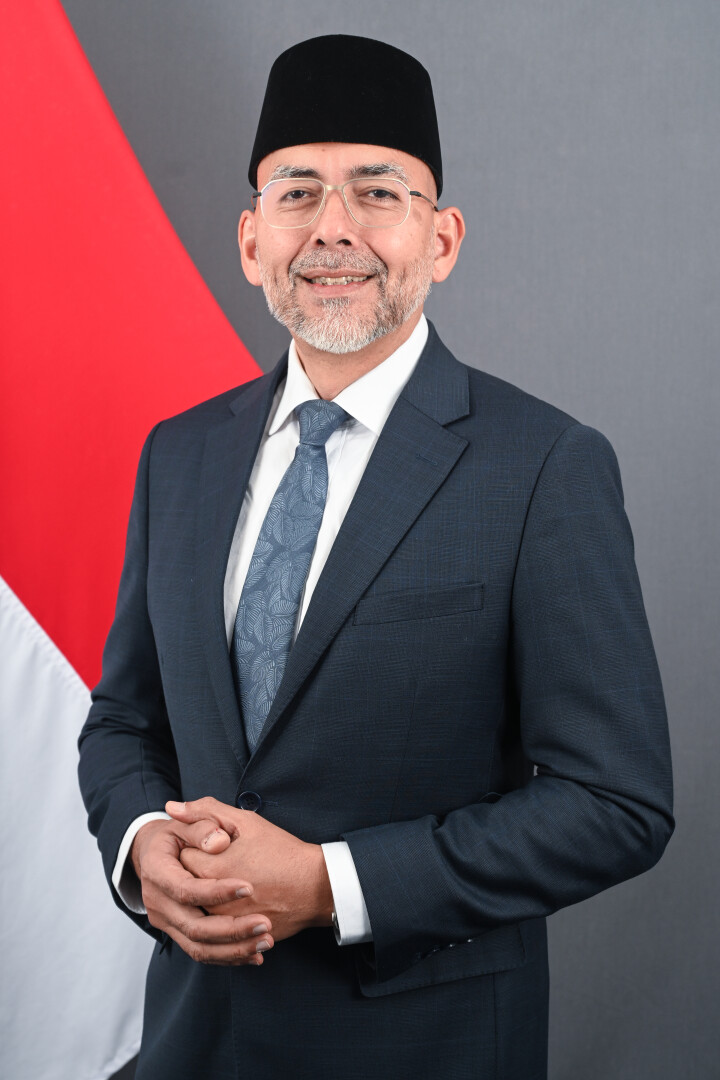

President of the United Nations Human Rights Council
- Incumbent
- Assumed office 1 January 2026
- Preceded by: Jürg Lauber

Permanent Representative of Indonesia to the United Nations in Geneva
- Incumbent
- Assumed office 25 August 2025
- President: Prabowo Subianto
- Preceded by: Febrian Alphyanto Ruddyard

Director General for ASEAN Cooperation
- In office 27 October 2020 – 18 November 2025
- President: Joko Widodo; Prabowo Subianto
- Preceded by: Jose Antonio Morato Tavares
- Succeeded by: Ina Hagniningtyas Krisnamurthi

Ambassador of Indonesia to India and Bhutan
- In office 18 May 2017 – 17 November 2021
- President: Joko Widodo
- Preceded by: Rizali Wilmar Indrakesuma
- Succeeded by: Ina Hagniningtyas Krisnamurthi

Personal details
- Born: September 29, 1966 (age 59) Cologne, West Germany
- Spouse: Dewi Ratna Yuniasih
- Education: Parahyangan Catholic University; Naval Postgraduate School
- Nickname: Arto

Sidharto Reza Suryodipuro (born 29 September 1966) is an Indonesian diplomat who is currently Indonesia's permanent representative to the United Nations in Geneva since 2025 and the President of the United Nations Human Rights Council since 2026. He began his career at Indonesia's mission to the United Nations and later served in multiple postings including Canberra and New York. From 2014 to 2017, he was deputy ambassador to the United States before being appointed ambassador to India and Bhutan in 2017. He subsequently served as director general for ASEAN cooperation from 2020 until 2025, leading senior officials’ meetings during Indonesia's 2023 ASEAN chairmanship.

== Early life and education ==
Sidharto was born on 29 September 1966 in Cologne, West Germany. He came from a noble lineage from the Mangkunegaran royal family. His grandfather, Suyoto Suryodipuro, was one of the founders of Indonesia's foreign ministry and Radio Republik Indonesia. Sidharto initially aspired to be a pilot, pursuing a natural sciences major in high school. However, his eyesight and potential limitations led him to a different path. He majored in international relations at the Parahyangan Catholic University and, upon graduating in 1991, applied for the foreign ministry. His grandfather, who supported his application, died shortly before Sidharto passed the application exam for the foreign ministry. He pursued further studies at the Naval Postgraduate School with the Fulbright scholarship and received a master of arts with distinction in national security affairs in 2003.

== Career ==
Sidharto's career in the foreign ministry began in March 1992. He was assigned to Indonesia's mission in the United Nations, where he became Indonesia's delegate to UN's special committee of peacekeeping operations under the United Nations General Assembly. He then returned to the foreign ministry, serving as deputy director (chief of subdirectorate) for ASEAN political affairs. From 2004 to 2006, he served as first secretary at the embassy in Canberra, where he was responsible for managing and promoting Indonesia-Australia economic relations, including trade, investment, tourism, student exchanges, and development cooperation. He returned to the Indonesian mission for United Nations in New York as first secretary for political affairs from November 2006 to February 2009, serving as a delegate to the UN Security Council. In this role, he was in charge of African issues, including drafting Indonesia's positions, attending Security Council meetings, negotiating decisions, and representing Indonesia on matters such as regarding humanitarian affairs in Africa.

From March 2009 to June 2010, Suryodipuro held the position of deputy director for Asia Pacific Economic Cooperation (APEC), where he was responsible for Indonesia's preparation and participation in processes under the APEC Senior Officials' Meeting, including internal coordination, drafting positions, and attending meetings. Subsequently, from May 2010 to November 2014, he was promoted as director for Asia Pacific and Africa intra-regional cooperation, leading and coordinating inter-agency work for Indonesia's chairmanship of APEC in 2013. During this time, he was instrumental in serving the Indonesian delegation and formulating its position in various regional forums such as the South-West Pacific Dialogue (SWPD), Indian Ocean Rim Association for Regional Cooperation (IORARC), New Asia Africa Strategic Partnership (NAASP), Pacific Island Forum (PIF), Coral Triangle Initiative (CTI), and Asia Middle East Dialogue (AMED). He also served as the Secretary to the National Committee on Policy for APEC in the APEC's 2nd Senior Officials' Meeting, leading a team that coordinated and formulated the APEC Leaders' Bali Declaration in 2013, which brought Indonesia into closer engagement with the island countries of the Western Pacific.

Following this, he was appointed deputy ambassador to the United States from 1 December 2014 to July 2017. In an interview, he described the relationship between Indonesia and the United States as "asymmetrical but not unequal," highlighting the significant economic disparity and the importance of mutual benefit between both nations. He oversaw efforts to expand collaboration between the two countries through bilateral exchanges and global joint efforts to counter extremism. He proposed the creation of a council of religion and pluralism to foster moderation and cooperation across various sectors.

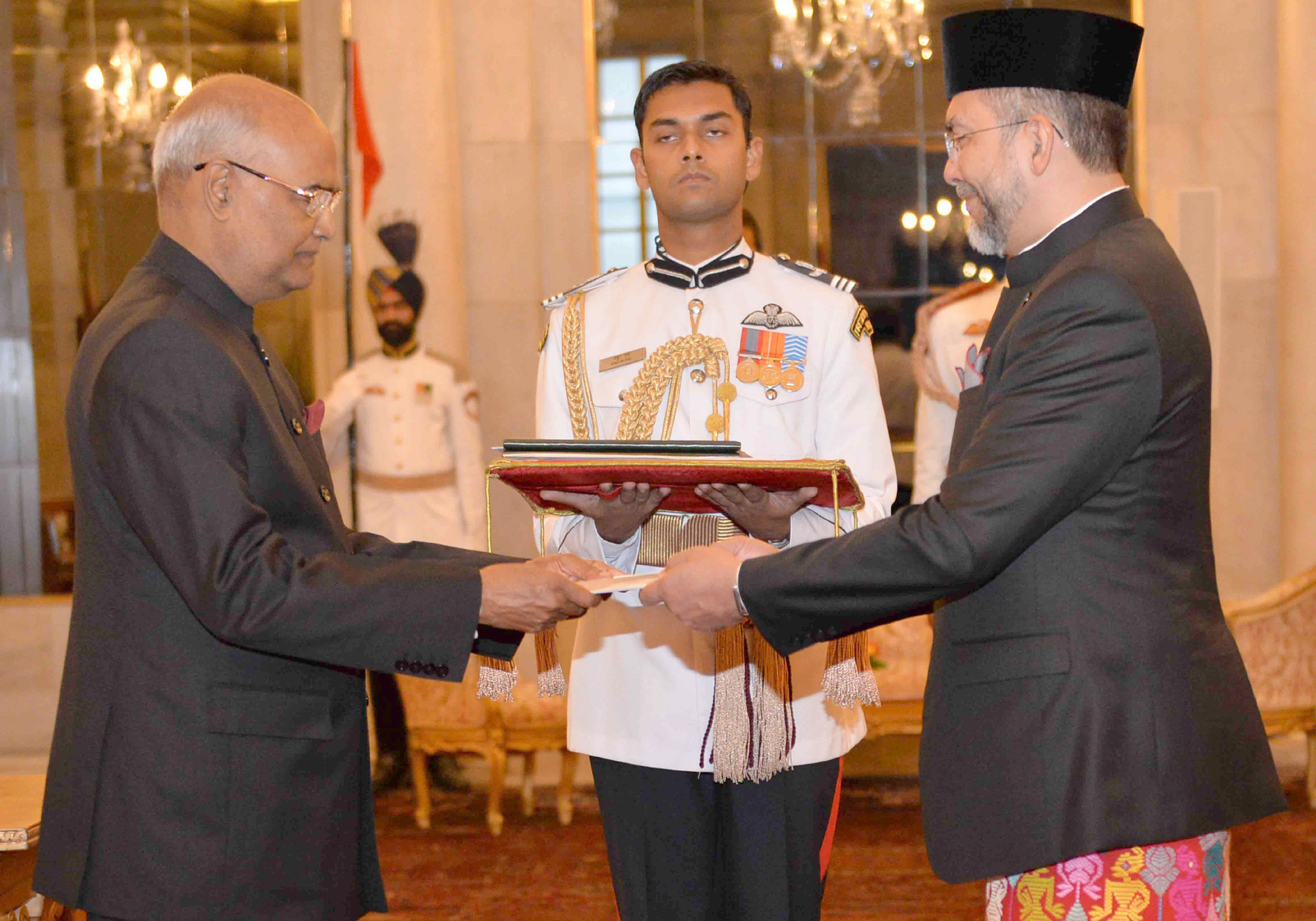
Sidharto Reza Suryodipuro presenting his credentials to President Ram Nath Kovind on 23 August 2017.

In November 2016, Sidharto was nominated by President Joko Widodo for ambassador to India and Bhutan. He passed an assessment by the House of Representative's first commission the next month and was installed on 18 May 2017. He presented his credentials to President Ram Nath Kovind of India on 23 August 2017 and to King Jigme Khesar Namgyel Wangchuck of Bhutan on 15 November 2017, becoming Indonesia's inaugural ambassador for the latter since bilateral relations was established in 2011. Under his leadership, the embassy organized a film festival to celebrate the 70th anniversary of diplomatic relations between Indonesia and India. For his efforts in protecting Indonesian citizens overseas, in 2020 he was awarded the Hassan Wirajuda Award in the head of mission category.

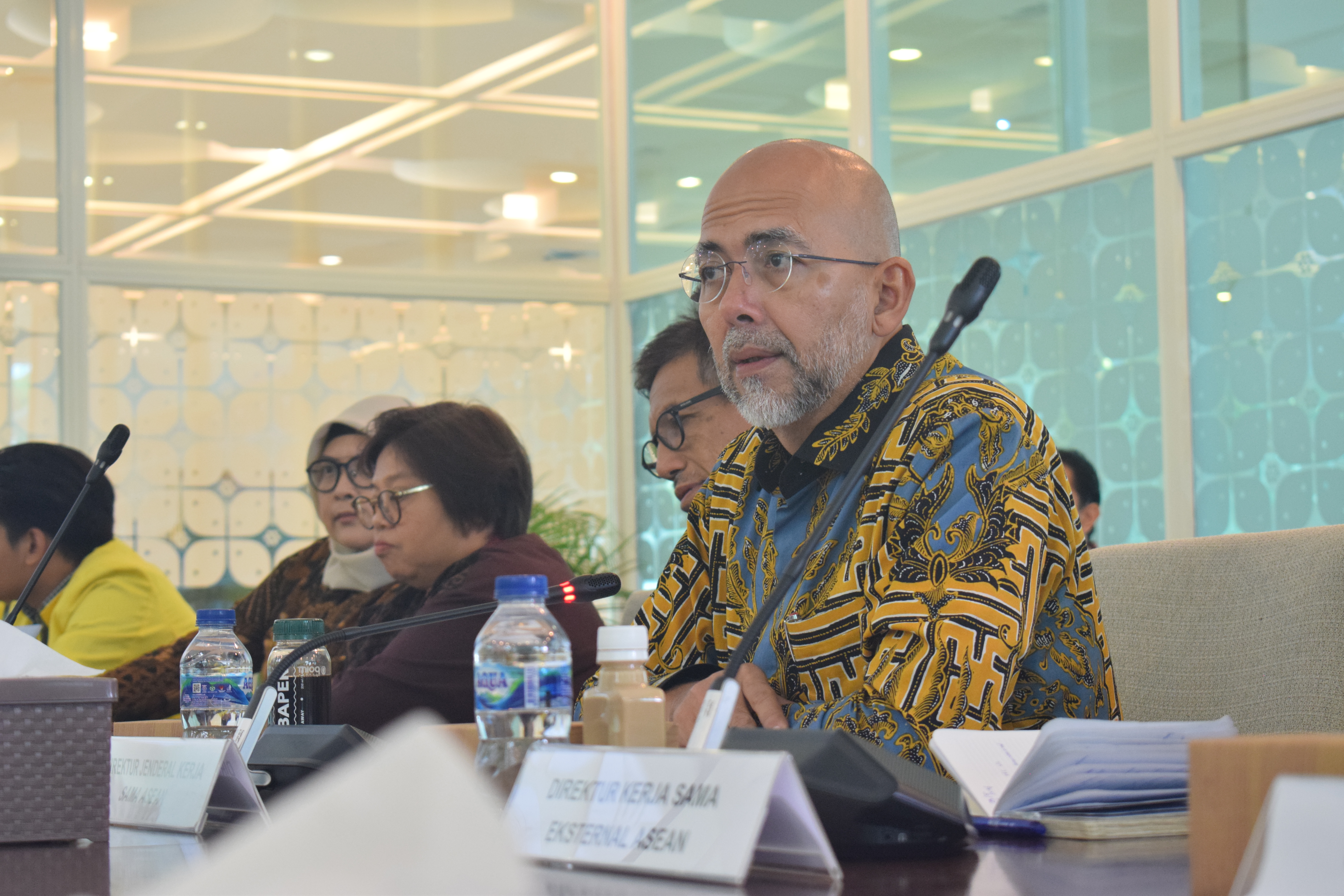
Sidharto in a discussion with University of Indonesia international relations faculty members, May 2024.

Upon serving as ambassador, Sidharto returned to Indonesia and assumed office as the director general for ASEAN cooperation in the foreign ministry on 27 October 2020. Two months into his office, a presidential decree on the new organization of the ministry was issued, and Sidharto re-assumed office on 18 August 2021. As director general, Sidharto was designated as Indonesia's senior officials meeting leader. During Indonesia's chairmanship of the ASEAN in 2023, Sidharto led the senior officials meeting, which was held in Labuan Bajo. The meeting discussed on the decision-making process in times of crisis and on strengthening ASEAN's economic resilience and regional significance. A second round of senior officials meeting, held in September 2023 during the summit, focused on enhancing its institutional capacity, as well as matters relating to food security, economic resilience, promotion of blue economy, and solidifying ASEAN as a growth hub.

In August 2024, Sidharto was nominated by President Joko Widodo as the permanent representative to the United Nations in New York. However, he was never summoned for a fit and proper test by the House of Representatives for the office. After Joko Widodo was replaced by Prabowo Subianto, Sidharto was nominated as the permanent representative to the United Nations in Geneva. His nomination was approved by the House of Representatives in a session on 8 July 2025. He was installed on 25 August 2025 and received his duties from chargé d'affaires ad interim Achsanul Habib on 25 November 2025. He presented his credentials to the Director General of the United Nations Office at Geneva Tatiana Valovaya on 26 November 2025.

In December 2025, Indonesia became the sole candidate in light of the Group of Asia and the Pacific Small Island Developing States turn for the presidency of the United Nations Human Rights Council (UNHRC). Sidharto was designated as the nominee for the UNHRC president on behalf of Indonesia. Indonesia's bid was approved by the group at a meeting in Geneva on 23 December 2025 with 34 out 47 member nations voting in favor. Sidharto was elected as UNHRC president via voice vote in an UNHRC meeting on 8 January 2026.
