= I Gusti Agung Wesaka Puja =

Indonesian diplomat (born 1962)

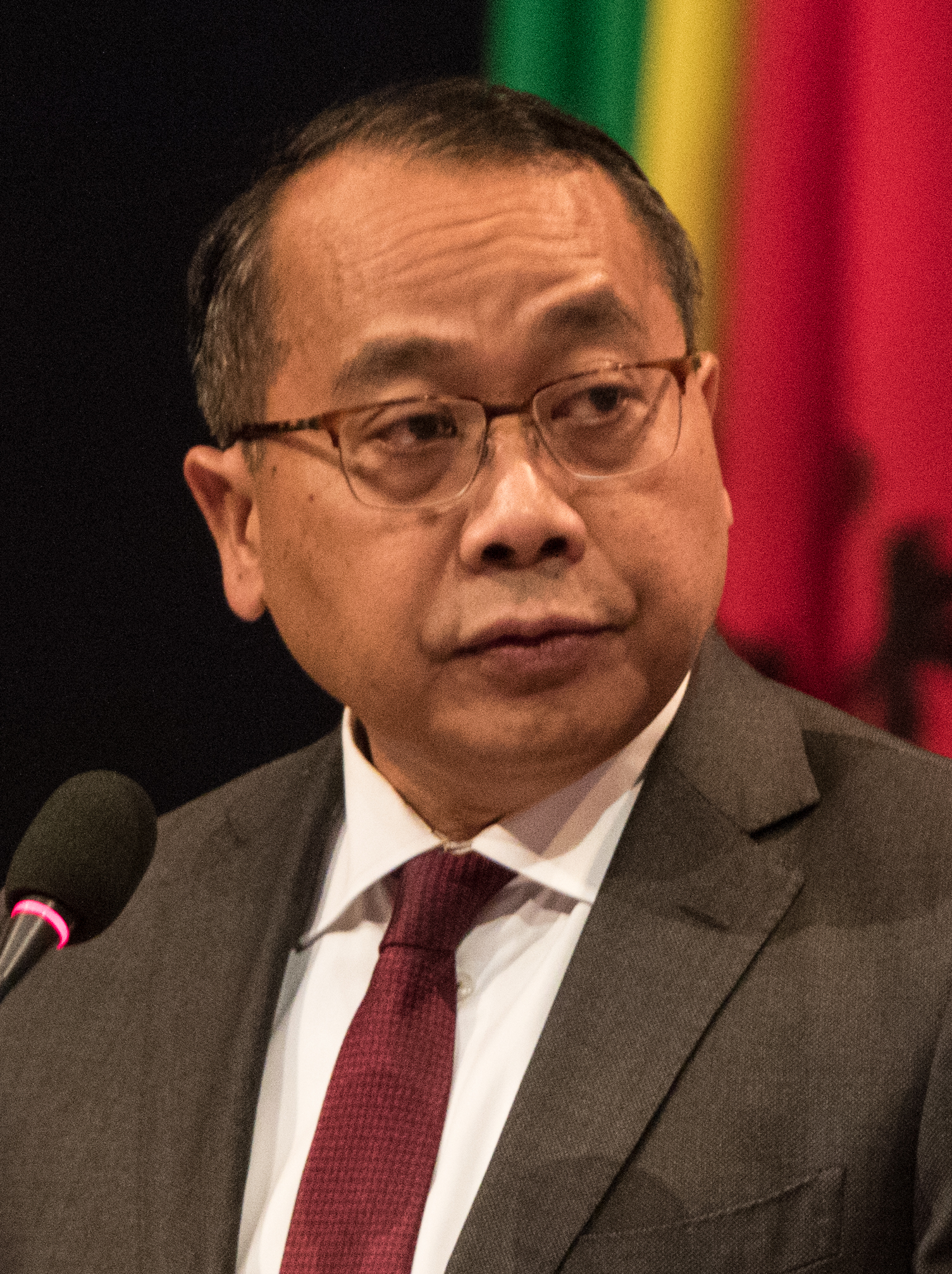

Ambassador of Indonesia to the Netherlands and OPCW
- In office February 2016 – June 2020
- President: Joko Widodo
- Preceded by: Retno Marsudi
- Succeeded by: Mayerfas

Director General of ASEAN Cooperation
- In office 12 April 2012 – 23 May 2016
- Preceded by: Djauhari Oratmangun
- Succeeded by: Jose Antonio Morato Tavares

Ambassador of Indonesia to Austria, Slovenia, United Nations, and other International Organisations in Vienna
- In office March 2010 – 12 April 2012
- President: Susilo Bambang Yudhoyono
- Preceded by: Triyono Wibowo
- Succeeded by: Rachmat Budiman

Personal details
- Born: January 11, 1962 (age 64) Bali, Indonesia
- Spouse: Rusdijana Puja
- Children: 2
- Education: Gadjah Mada University (Drs); University of Michigan (M.A.)

I Gusti Agung Wesaka Puja (born 11 January 1962) is an Indonesian diplomat who served as ambassador to the Netherlands and the Organisation for the Prohibition of Chemical Weapons (OPCW) from February 2016 to June 2020 and ambassador to Austria, Slovenia, and the United Nations Office at Vienna from 2010 to 2012. Between his two ambassadorial terms, he was the director general of ASEAN cooperation from 2012 to 2016.

== Early life and education ==
Born in Bali on 11 January 1962, Puja completed his undergraduate studies at Gadjah Mada University in 1985. He later attended the University of Michigan in Ann Arbor, receiving his master's degree from Rackham Graduate School in 1991. He also attended various foreign service courses. He is married and has two children.

== Diplomatic career ==
Puja's diplomatic career began when he joined the foreign ministry in 1986. From 1988 to 1990, he served as an official in the directorate for Asia Pacific affairs at the Ministry of Foreign Affairs in Jakarta. He then held his first overseas posting as the second secretary at the embassy in Vienna from 1992 to 1996. Returning to Jakarta, he was an official in the directorate for international organizations from 1996 to 1998, before being assigned as a counsellor at the permanent mission of the Republic of Indonesia to the UN, WTO and Other International Organizations in Geneva from 1998 to 2002. During this period, he also served as the rapporteur general for the regional preparatory meeting of the World Conference Against Racism in Teheran in 2001.

From 3 May 2002 to 2006, Puja served as the director for human rights and socio-cultural affairs at the foreign ministry. While holding this post, he was heavily involved in the Aceh peace process, serving as a member of the government negotiating team for the "Humanitarian Pause" and "Cessation of Hostilities Agreement" from 2000 to 2003, facilitated by the Henry Dunant Centre. In 2005, he was also a member of the government negotiators for the peace agreement between the government of the Republic of Indonesia and the Free Aceh Movement, which was facilitated by the Crisis Management Initiative in Helsinki, Finland.

Following this, he was appointed deputy permanent representative of Indonesia to the UN, WTO and other international organizations in Geneva from 2006 to 2009. During his tenure in Geneva, he served in a number of roles, including coordinator for the G-21 at the Conference on Disarmament from May to June 2006; coordinator for the Asian Group at WIPO from June to December 2006; president of the inter-governmental committee on intellectual property and genetic resources, traditional knowledge and folklore at WIPO for 2006–2007; vice president of the United Nations Compensation Commission in Geneva for 2007–2008; and coordinator for agenda item 7, "Transparency in Armaments", at the Conference on Disarmament in Geneva from 2008 to 2009. During this posting, he also served as president of the committee of participants for the General System of Trade Preferences (GSTP) at UNCTAD, coordinator for the Asian Group at UNCTAD, chairman of the commission on trade in goods and services and commodities at UNCTAD, coordinator for the Non Aligned Movement for the 2nd Prepcom NPT Review Conference in Geneva, and was part of the troika for the Universal Periodic Review of the Human Rights Council for India, Japan, United Arab Emirate, Uzbekistan, Djibouti and Yemen in 2008.

After a brief period without any assignment, Puja returned to Geneva with his appointment as ambassador to of Austria, Slovenia, and permanent representative to the United Nations and other International Organisations in Vienna from March 2010 to 2012. In this capacity, he was the Indonesian sherpa for the Nuclear Security Summit 2012. He also held several prominent international positions, including vice president of the twelfth United Nations congress on crime prevention and criminal justice in Salvador, Brazil, in 2010; coordinator for the ASEAN Vienna committee in 2010; vice president of the 54th IAEA general conference in 2010; vice president of the UN conference on anti corruption in 2011; vice president of the UN conference on trans organisations crime in 2011; and governor of Indonesia to the IAEA board of governors from 2011 to 2012. He also served as chairman of the meeting of competent authorities to early notification on nuclear safety conventions in 2012.

On 12 April 2012, Puja became the director general of ASEAN cooperation. He was ex officio Indonesia's ASEAN senior official meeting leader for and a member of the high-level task force Indonesia on the ASEAN community post-2015 vision. After serving as ASEAN director general, I Gusti became the ambassador to the Netherlands and the Organisation for the Prohibition of Chemical Weapons (OPCW) from February 2016 to June 2020.

== Personal life ==
Puja is married to Rusdijana Puja and has two daughters.

== Awards and honors ==
- Satya Lencana Karya Satya 10 years service award (1997)
- Satya Lencana Karya Satya 20 years service award (2007)
- Satya Lencana Dharma Nusa (2006)
- Bintang Jasa Utama (2010)
- Ksatria Bakti Husada Arutala (2011)
