= Ina Hagniningtyas Krisnamurthi =

Indonesian diplomat (born 1968)

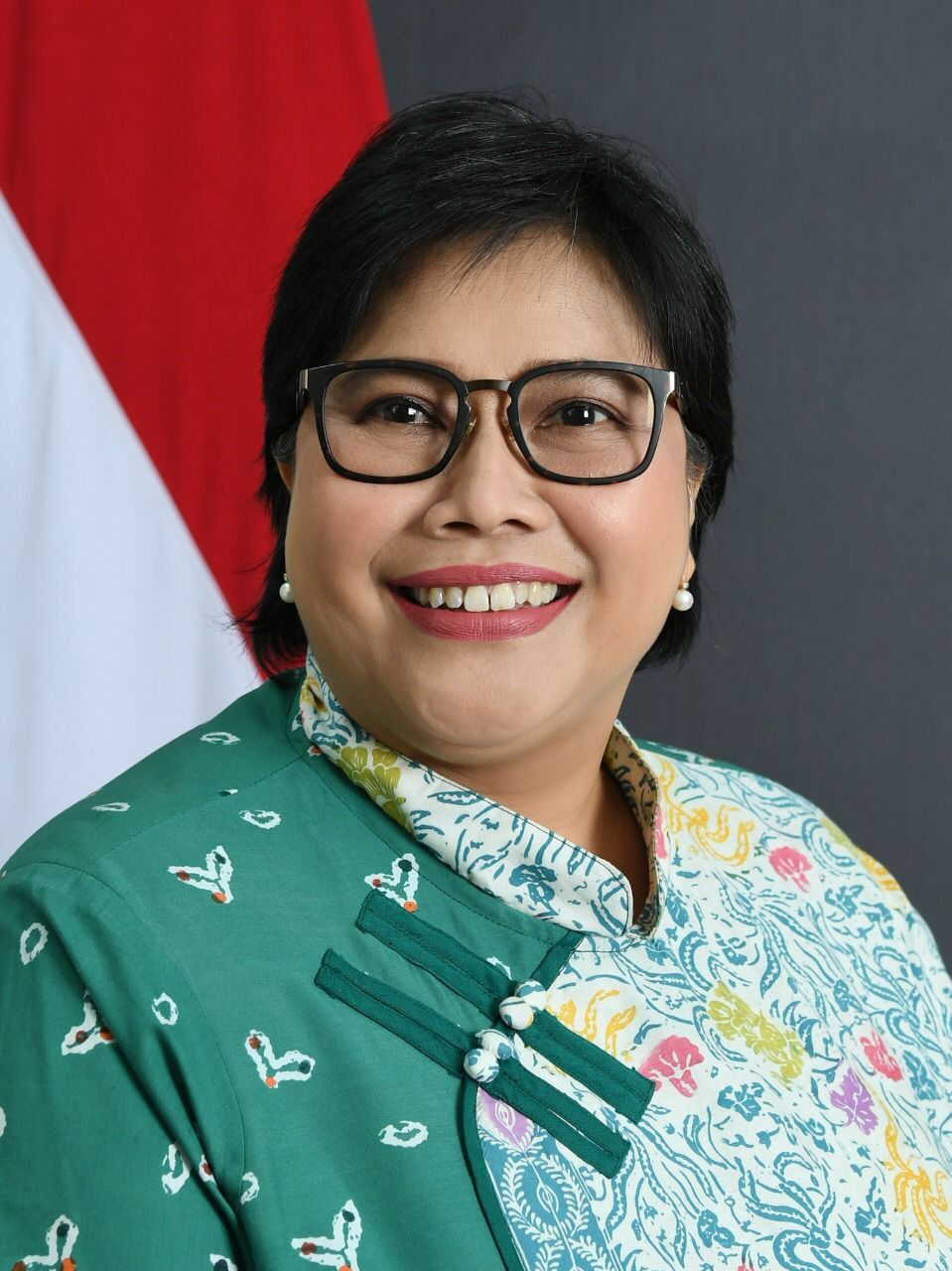

Director General of ASEAN Cooperation
- Incumbent
- Assumed office 18 December 2025
- President: Prabowo Subianto
- Preceded by: Sidharto Reza Suryodipuro

Ambassador of Indonesia to India and Bhutan
- In office 17 November 2021 – March 2026
- President: Joko Widodo; Prabowo Subianto
- Preceded by: Sidharto Reza Suryodipuro
- Succeeded by: Yudho Sasongko (CDA)

Personal details
- Born: 5 December 1968 (age 57) Bitung, Indonesia
- Education: University of Indonesia; Griffith University

Ina Hagniningtyas Krisnamurthi (born 5 December 1968) is an Indonesian diplomat who is currently serving as director general of ASEAN cooperation since 2025 and ambassador to India and Bhutan since March 2022. Prior to her current posting in New Delhi, she served as deputy permanent representative to the United Nations in New York from 2016 to 2019 and advisor to the foreign minister for economic diplomacy from 2019 to 2022.

== Early life and education ==
Born on 5 December 1968 in Bitung, North Sulawesi, Ina Hagniningtyas Krisnamurthi's parents hail from Yogyakarta and Central Java. Her first name, Ina, was an abbreviation of Indonesia. She began studying Japanese literature at the University of Indonesia in 1987 and graduated in 1992 with a thesis on post-World War II part time farming (kengyō nōka) in Japan. She then obtained a master of arts in international studies from Griffith University in 1997.

== Career ==
Krisnamurthi entered the foreign service in 1993. Her early diplomatic postings included serving as junior consul for information and socio-cultural affairs at the consulate general in Vancouver, Canada, with the rank of second secretary from January 2000 to September 2003. She was then assigned to the political section of the embassy in Brussels on 30 July 2006 with the rank of first secretary, and later counsellor. Upon completing her tenure in July 2010, she became the deputy director (chief of subdirectorate) for European Union affairs. In these roles, she was a lead negotiator for various international agreements, including the Trade and Sustainable Development Chapter of the Indonesia-EU Comprehensive Economic Partnership Agreement (IEU-CEPA) and was involved in negotiations for RCEP, ASEAN, and WTO.

In 2013, she became the director of trade, industry, investment, and intellectual property rights within the foreign ministry, before being transferred to the ASEAN directorate general as director for ASEAN economic cooperation on 10 January 2014. She served until 2016, and by September that year she was appointed as the deputy permanent representative to the United Nations in New York. She was involved in advocating issues concerning women and children and has worked to foster international collaboration to achieve the United Nations Sustainable Development Goals. During her tenure, she oversaw Indonesia's election as a non-permanent member of the United Nations Security Council.

After serving in New York, in February 2019 Ina returned to Jakarta to take office as advisor (expert staff) to the foreign minister for economic diplomacy. In 2021, she became the Chair of the 31st Intergovernmental Group on Oilseeds, Oils, and Fats at the FAO. Ina was involved in facing the discriminatory treatment of palm oil from Indonesia by the European Union, where she planned the formation of a joint working group with the EU to discuss vegetable oils alongside other ASEAN countries.

In June 2021, Ina was nominated by President Joko Widodo as ambassador for India, with concurrent accreditation to Bhutan. Upon passing an assessment by the House of Representative's first commission in July, she was installed as ambassador on 17 November. He presented his credentials to President of India Ram Nath Kovind on 16 March 2022 and to King of Bhutan Jigme Khesar Namgyel Wangchuck on 7 October 2022.

On 18 December 2025, Ina was sworn in as the director general of ASEAN cooperation.

== Organizations ==
In addition to her professional career, Krisnamurthi is an Honorary Board Member of the Business & Export Development Organization (BEDO), a Bali-based group that supports MSMEs in Indonesia with business development and exporting. She is also a member of the advisory board for the Center on International Cooperation at New York University.
