= Embassy of Indonesia, Moscow =

Embassy of Indonesia in Moscow, Russia

Coordinates: 55°44′17″N 37°37′49″E

Embassy of Indonesia, Moscow; Kedutaan Besar Republik Indonesia di Moskwa

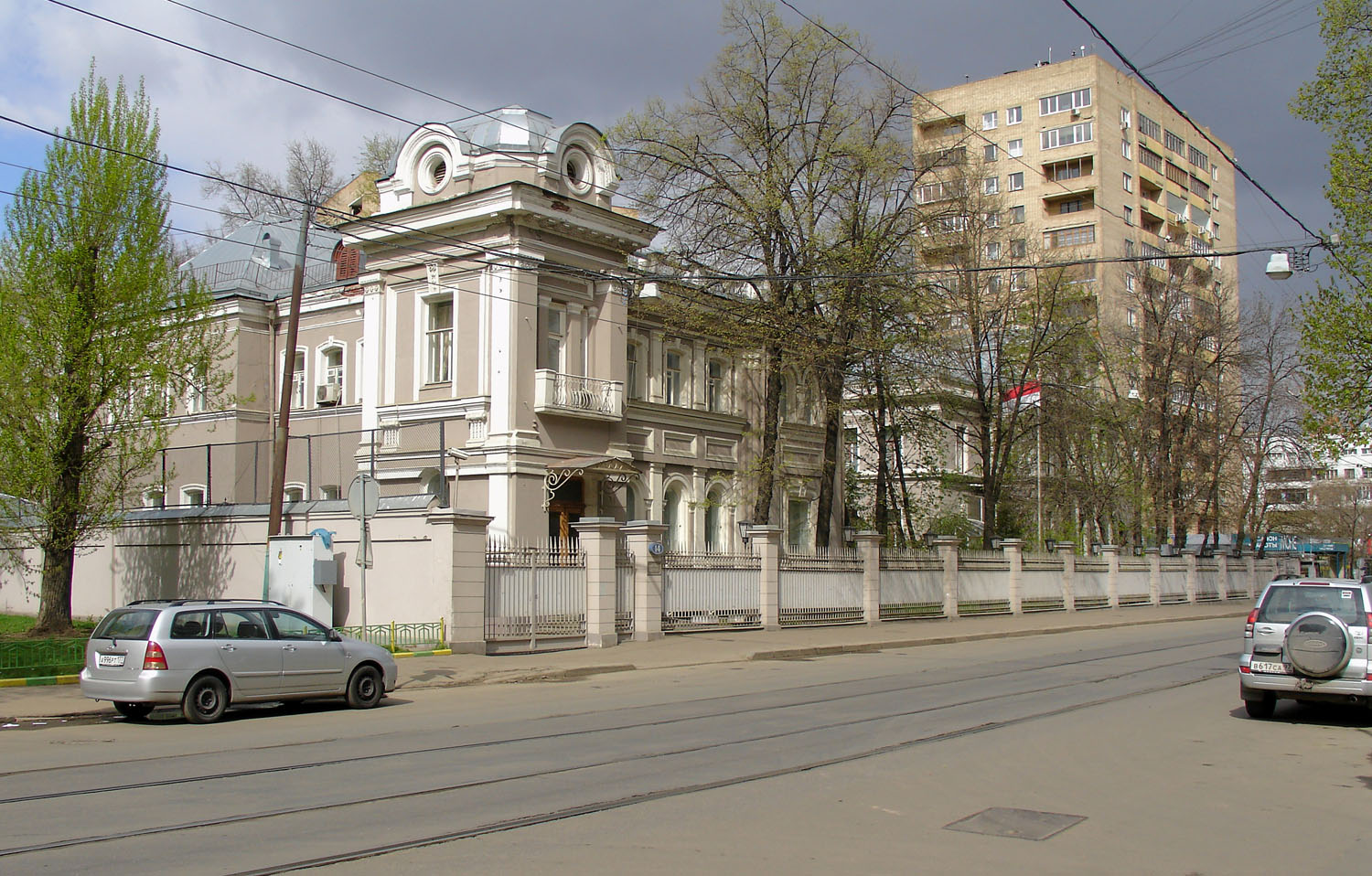
- Location: Moscow, Russia
- Address: Novokuznetskaya Ulitsa No. 12; Moscow, Russian Federation
- Ambassador: Jose Antonio Morato Tavares
- Jurisdiction: Russia; Belarus
- Website: www.kemlu.go.id/moscow/en/

The Embassy of the Republic of Indonesia in Moscow (Indonesian: Kedutaan Besar Republik Indonesia di Moskwa; Russian: Посольство Индонезии в Москве) is the diplomatic mission of Indonesia in the Russian Federation and concurrently accredited to the Republic of Belarus. It is located at 12 Novokuznetskaya Street (Russian: Новокузнецкая ул., 12) in the Zamoskvorechye District of Moscow.

The Embassy occupies two former private residences built on adjacent lots in the beginning of the 20th century. The first, Protopopov-Tatischev House, was built in 1900s to the design of Vladimir Sherwood (Jr.). In 1911–1913 it was expanded by Gustav Helrich, who also designed and built the service buildings located deep inside the Embassy territory. The second is the residence of princes Urusov, was built in 1912 to the design of Ivan Rerberg. All these buildings are officially recognized listed memorials.

== See also ==
- Indonesia–Russia relations
- List of diplomatic missions in Indonesia
- List of diplomatic missions in Russia
- Diplomatic missions in Russia
