= Cecilia Piccioni =

Italian diplomat and business consultant

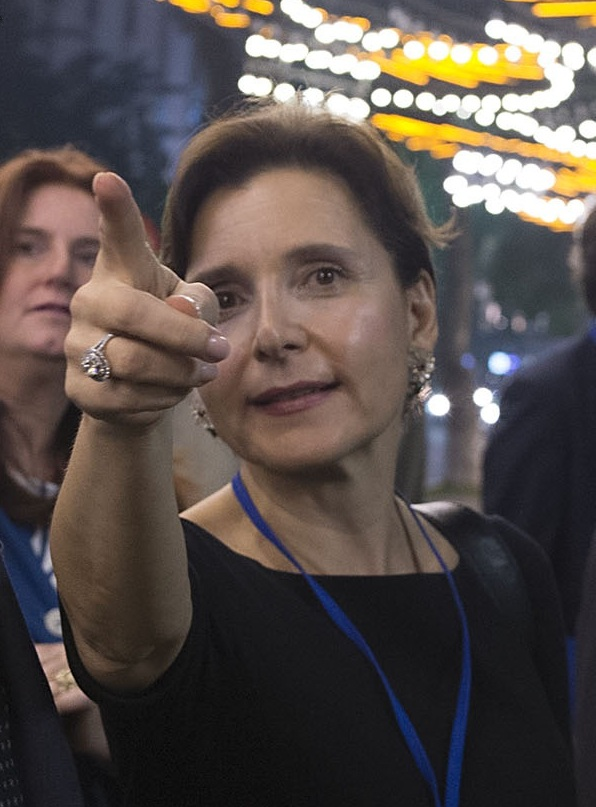
Ambassador Cecilia Piccioni in Hanoi (2015)

Cecilia Piccioni is an Italian diplomat and business consultant. She was the Italian ambassador to the Russian Federation.

== Career ==
She graduated from Sapienza University of Rome. She worked at the World Bank. She was Chief of the Economic and Trade Office in the Czech Republic. She was chief of staff to the ambassador to the United States. She was counselor to the United Nations.

She was ambassador to Vietnam.
