= Indonesia–Russia relations =

- Indonesia: Russia

Diplomatic mission
- Indonesian Embassy, Moscow: Russian Embassy, Jakarta

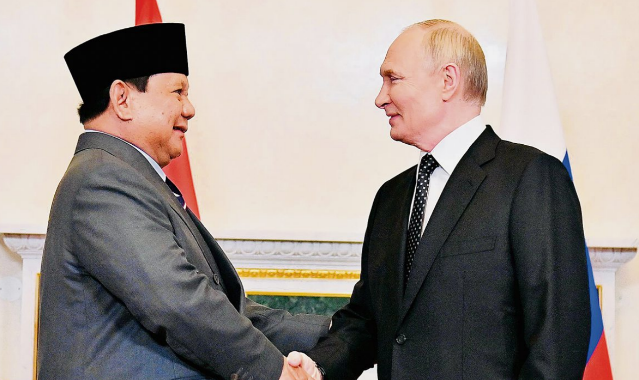
President Prabowo Subianto met with President Vladimir Putin at the Konstantinovsky Palace in St. Petersburg, Russia, on Thursday (June 19, 2025).

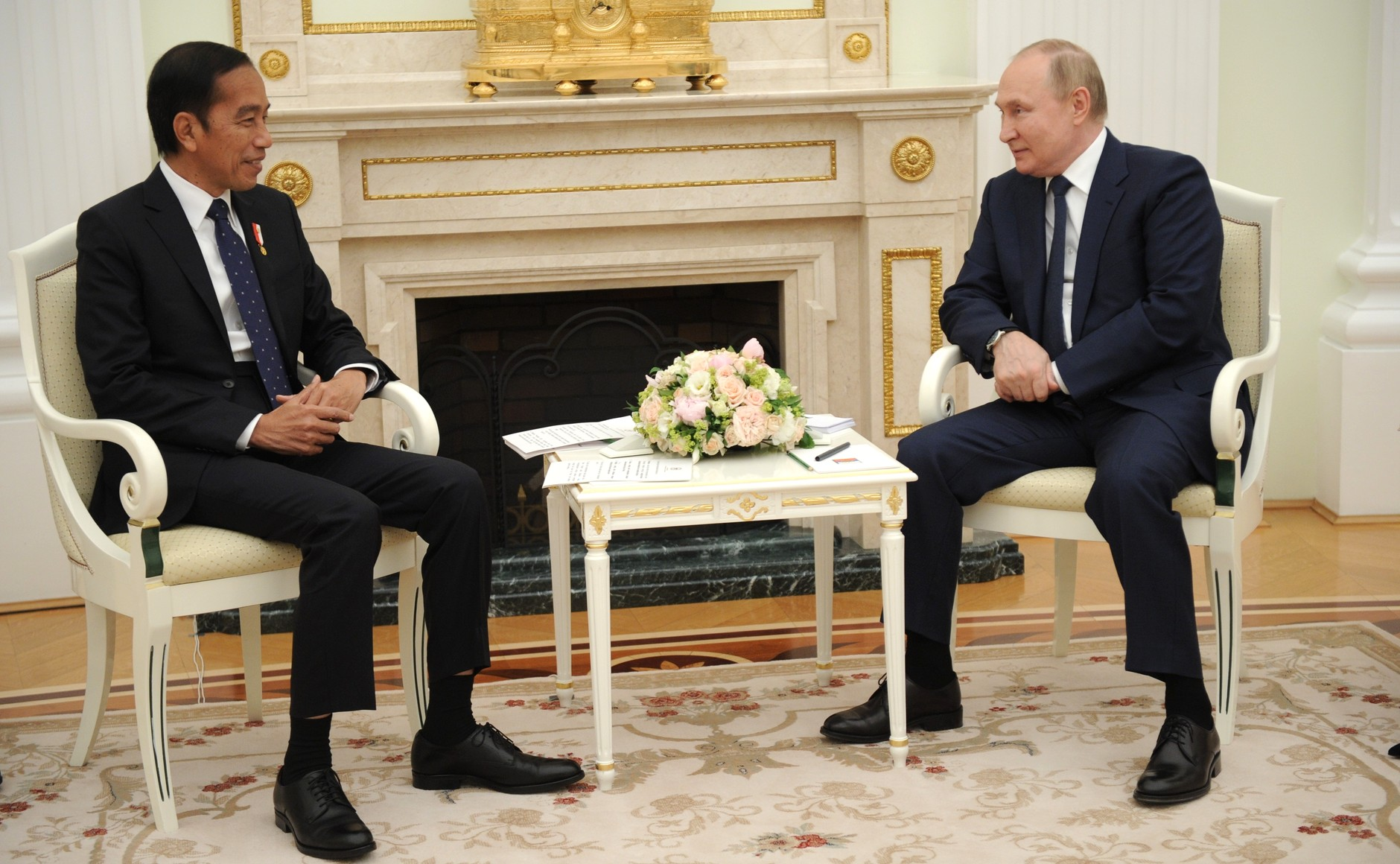
President Vladimir Putin and President Joko Widodo on 30 June 2022

Indonesia–Russia relations are the bilateral relations between Indonesia and Russia. Indonesia and the Soviet Union established diplomatic relations on 3 February 1950. Russia has an embassy in Jakarta and has announced plans to open a consulate-general in Denpasar, while Indonesia has an embassy in Moscow along with an honorary consulate in Saint Petersburg. Both countries are members of the APEC, G-20 and BRICS.

According to a 2018 Pew Research Center poll, 46% of Indonesians have a favourable view of Russia, with 31% expressing an unfavourable view.

== History ==
=== Colonial era ===
In the 19th century, Imperial Russian maritime expeditions started visiting the archipelago. In 1806, two sailing-ships, the Nadezhda and the Neva, under Ivan Krusenshtern and Yuri Lisyansky, engaged in the first Russian circumnavigation of the earth, and approached the shores of Indonesia.

The fact that Russia paid much attention to maintaining contacts with the Indonesians was confirmed by the establishment, in 1894, of the first Russian full-time consulate in Batavia, the capital of the Dutch East Indies. Somewhat earlier, in 1890, the Pamyat Azova and the Vladimir Monomakh, the ships on which Crown Prince Nicholas, the future Tsar Nicholas II of Russia, made his Eastern voyage, dropped anchor in the same harbour.

=== Soviet era ===
Indonesia–Soviet Union relations
- Indonesia: Soviet Union

Diplomatic mission
- Indonesian Embassy, Moscow: Soviet Embassy, Jakarta

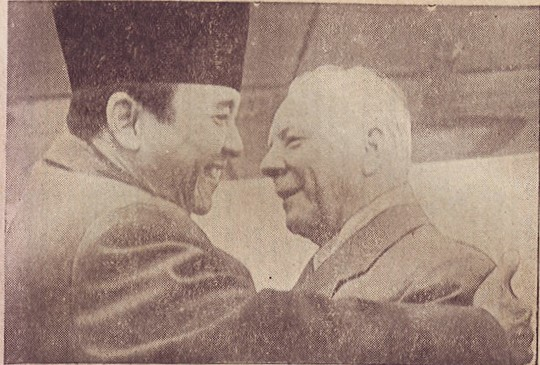
President Sukarno and President Voroshilov in a state meeting on 1958.

The Soviet Union established diplomatic relations with Indonesia in 1950 and is one of the first countries to recognize Indonesia's sovereignty and independence from the Dutch after the end of World War II, alongside Egypt and other Arab states.

Early in the Cold War, both countries had close relations, with Indonesian president Sukarno visiting Moscow and Soviet leader Nikita Khrushchev visiting Jakarta. The first military deal between Indonesia and the Soviet Union happened in 1958, with the import of Soviet GAZ-69 trucks. In 1960, General Abdul Haris Nasution visited Moscow to negotiate an arms deal with the USSR. It turned out to be a $2.5 billion deal, involving the purchase of Mil Mi-4, Mil Mi-6 helicopters and MiG-15, MiG-17, MiG-19, MiG-21, Ilyushin Il-28, Tupolev Tu-16s including the KSR-1 variants armed with AS-1 Kennel anti-ship missiles, Antonov An-12 and Ilyushin Il-14 transport planes., and Whiskey-class submarines, Komar-class missile boats and one Sverdlov-class cruiser. This constituted the Soviet assistance to Indonesia for the recapture of Netherlands New Guinea in 1961–62, known as Operation Trikora.

The Soviet Union helped Indonesia build the Friendship Hospital {id} and the Gelora Bung Karno Stadium, as well as transport and industrial infrastructure facilities that are in operation to this day. Great strides were made in military-technical cooperation.

When Sukarno was ousted by General Suharto, relations between the two states deteriorated, likely due to Indonesia's anti-communist policy under Suharto following the controversial communist coup attempt and the subsequent mass murder of thousands of alleged leftists. However, unlike relations with China during the Suharto regime, diplomatic relations were not suspended as the Soviet Union had no known involvement in the coup attempt. During this time, Indonesia was one of many countries that boycotted the 1980 Summer Olympics held in Moscow.

President Suharto visited the Soviet Union for the first time in 1989, coinciding with events leading to the fall of communism in Europe.

=== Modern Russia ===
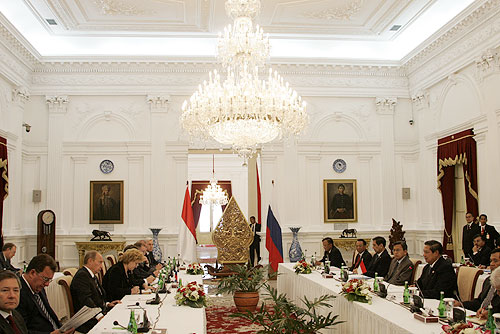
President Vladimir Putin meets President Yudhoyono at the Merdeka Palace during the Russian state visit of 2007.

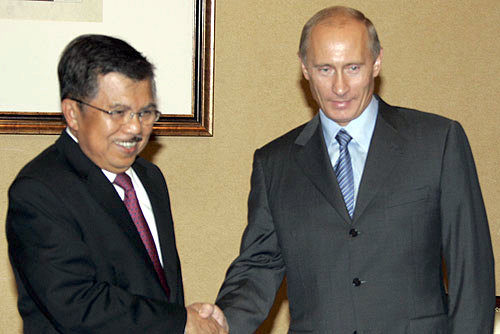
VP Jusuf Kalla with Vladimir Putin (then Prime Minister).

Under Boris Yeltsin and later Vladimir Putin, relations were generally stable and continued to the presenting for Fully Mutual cooperation to understanding between two countries to forging the Special relationship from the Presidency of Megawati Sukarnoputri until the present. In 2000, Indonesia-Russia cooperation relations entered a new phase and experienced in a significant increase. President Abdurrahman Wahid, President Megawati Soekarnoputri, President Susilo Bambang Yudhoyono and President Joko Widodo discussed cooperation between the two countries. In political field, the first meeting since the reform era in Indonesia and the Russian Federation era was carried out by President Abdurrahman Wahid and President Vladimir Putin, there was not much discussion produced. Meanwhile, Megawati Soekarnoputri in 2001 began to stretch Indonesia–Russia relations. Susilo Bambang Yudhoyono discussed the follow-up in the purchase of Russian warplanes. President Joko Widodo and Russian President Vladimir Putin held limited meetings.

==== During the Russo-Ukrainian War ====
Although several Indonesian officials have condemned the 2022 Russian invasion of Ukraine and the subsequent Russo-Ukrainian war, the government maintained a neutral reaction to the conflict and calls for a peacekeeping solution between the two countries. On the contrary, ordinary Indonesian citizens have expressed support for pro-Russian narratives of the conflict on social media, in line with the rising anti-Western sentiment, especially among the Muslim majority.

On 3 June 2023, Indonesia's defense minister Prabowo Subianto proposed a multi-point peace plan including a ceasefire and establishing a demilitarised zone observed and monitored by the United Nations Peacekeeping Forces. He said that a UN referendum should be held "to ascertain objectively the wishes of the majority of the inhabitants of the various disputed areas". Prabowo's proposal was criticised by EU foreign policy chief Josep Borrell and Ukrainian Defense Minister Oleksii Reznikov.

In July 2024, Reuters reported that Indonesian state-owned refiner Pertamina was seeking to buy Russian crude oil for the first time since the start of the Russo-Ukrainian war, adding Russian crude grades to its tender lists to buy crude oil for delivery in September 2024.

In mid-June 2025, Indonesian President Prabowo Subianto attended the 2025 St Petersburg International Economic Forum as a guest of honour. He met Russian President Vladimir Putin and the two heads of state signed a strategic partnership agreement. In addition, the Indonesian and Russian sovereign funds Danantara and the Russian Direct Investment Fund signed an agreement to create an investment fund worth 2 billion Euros (US$2.9 billion).

== Military cooperation ==
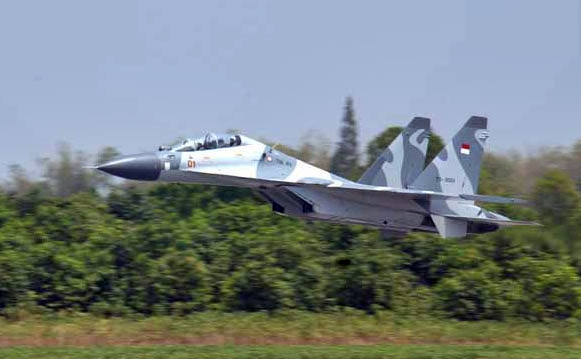
Sukhoi Su-30 of the Indonesian Air Force

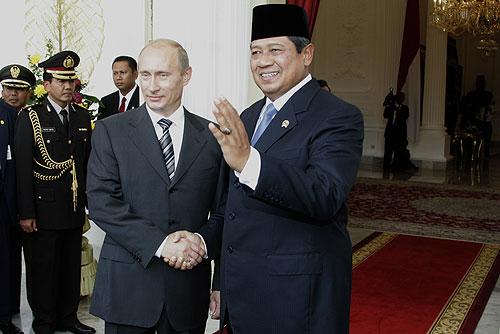
President Yudhoyono meeting Russian President Vladimir Putin to sign a defense deal in Jakarta, September 2007.

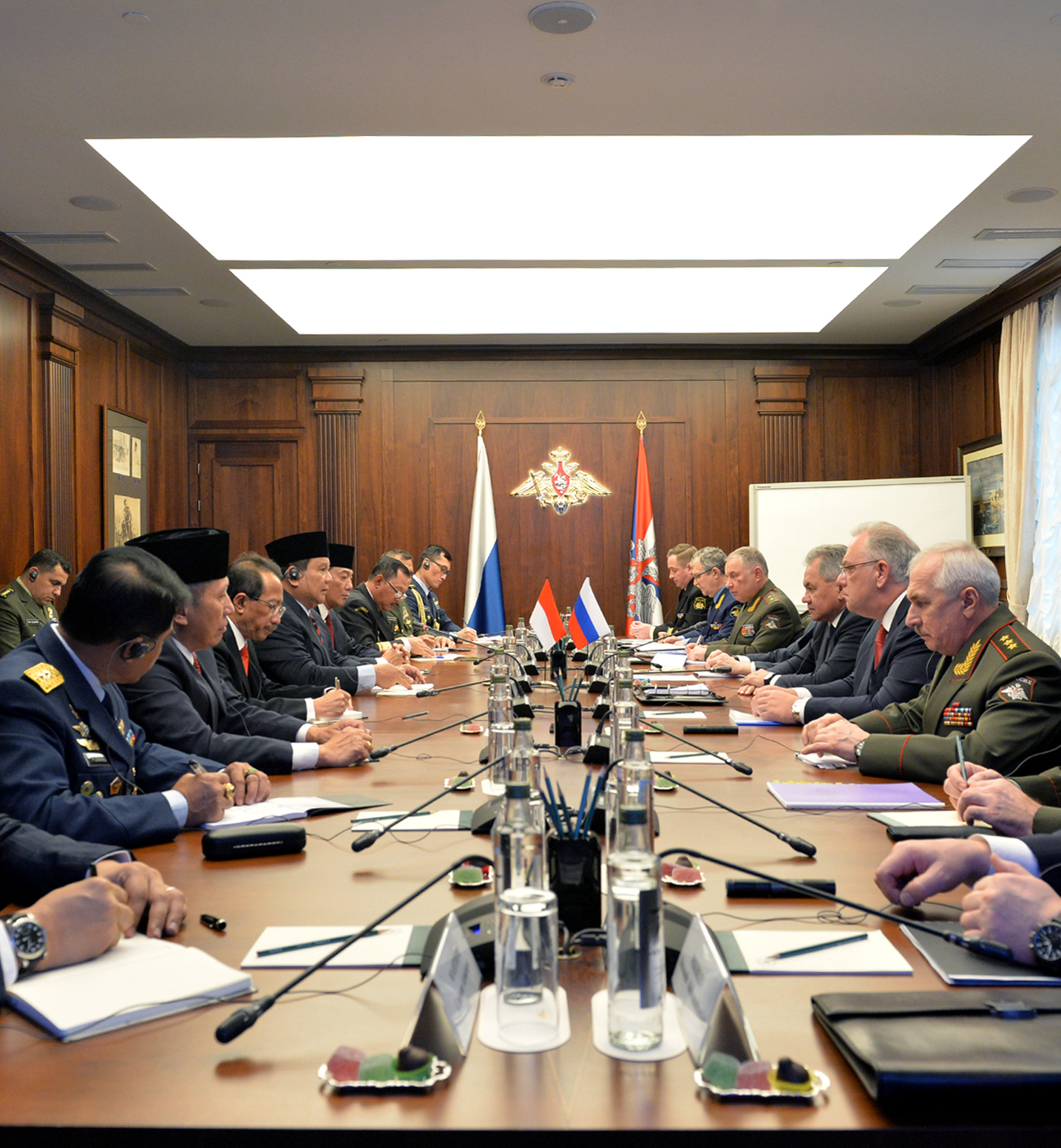
Indonesian Defense Minister Prabowo Subianto with Russian Defense Minister Sergei Shoigu, 27 March 2021.

Russia is a major arms supplier to Indonesia. Russian arms exports to Indonesia include the Sukhoi Su-30, Sukhoi Su-27, Mil Mi-35, BMP-3, and Mil Mi-17. Currently, Indonesian Marine Corps operated 54 BMP-3F & 1 BREM-L currently in service (17 BMP-3F arrived in 2010 and another 37 BMP-3F & 1 BREM-L were received in 2014). Another 22 BMP-3F were ordered in 2019 along with 21 BT-3Fs.

In 2004, Indonesia bought US$1 billion worth of yet unspecified Russian weapons within the next 15 years. More immediate are Indonesia's plans to purchase heavy armaments at a total value of US$850 million. This package is to include ten Mi-17 U-5 carrier helicopters and one Mi-35P combat helicopter for the Army, and twenty BMP-3F amphibian tanks and two submarines for the Navy forces. No actual contracts for arms deliveries were signed. The most valuable package for Indonesia's defense capabilities, however, is for the Air Force and Navy. Six units of Sukhoi combat planes, three Su-27 type and three Su-30 has added to the two Su-27s and two Su-30s already purchased by the previous Megawati Sukarnoputri administration.

In late 2007, Indonesia purchased military weapons from Russia with long term payment. Indonesian airlines also were considering purchasing the Sukhoi Superjet 100 from Russia, but a 2012 demonstration crash has put such talks on hold. Indonesia now says it could take as long as a year to analyze the flight data recorder recovered from the crash site.

In 2014, Russia offered the Sukhoi Su-35 to Indonesia to replace its ageing F-5E Tiger II fleet. The following year, the Indonesian Ministry of Defence selected the Su-35 ahead of the Eurofighter Typhoon, Dassault Rafale, F-16, and Saab JAS 39 Gripen; the Defence Ministry cited the Indonesian Air Force's familiarity with the Su-27SK and Su-30MK2 as the reason for its selection. By 2017, negotiations between the two parties over the Su-35 had reached an advanced stage, with the Indonesian government later agreed in principle to conduct a barter trade of agricultural products for a reported eleven aircraft. In February 2018, Russia and Indonesia finalised a contract for 11 aircraft, worth $1.14 billion. The first delivery was expected in October 2018, but was delayed to 2019. On 8 July 2020, Russian Ambassador to Indonesia, Lyudmila Vorobieva stated that Indonesia's plan to buy 11 Su-35s from Russia is still continuing.

According to the Russian Ministry of Defence, on 7 December 2017 two nuclear-capable Tupolev Tu-95 strategic bombers of the Russian Air Force flew a patrol based from Biak Island in Papua, Indonesia. The Russian commander stated the navigation exercises were for the purpose of checking the accuracy of long-distance flying over the seas. Russia's Defence Ministry said two Tupolev Tu-95MS Bears flew from the Amur region, in Russia's far east, to Frans Kaisiepo Airport in Biak, on the northern coast of Indonesia's eastern province of Papua as part of an international visit.

In December 2020, Indonesian Navy and Russian Navy conducted a joint naval exercise of Passex (Passing Exercise) Rusindo-20. The exercise took place in the Java Sea on Thursday, 17 December 2020. Indonesian Navy sent 3 ships (KRI Karel Satsuitubun, KRI Diponegoro, and KRI Tombak), while the Russian Navy sent 3 ships (Varyag, Admiral Panteleyev, and Pechenga). The exercise conducted several drills such as Maneuver Exercise, RAS approach, Flaghoist, Flashex, and Passing Exercise.

Indonesia and Russia commenced their inaugural joint naval exercises on 4 November 2024, marking a new phase in Indonesia's defense diplomacy as it fosters partnerships with multiple global powers under President Prabowo's direction.

== Economic cooperation ==
In 2012, the value of Indonesian imports from Russia amounted to US$2.5 billion, and Indonesia's export value to Russia amounted to US$867.3 million, until 2016 the value of Indonesian imports from Russia was US$850.6 million, and Indonesia's export value to Russia was US$1.3 billion. There was a tendency to decrease the value of Russian imports to Indonesia, and the export value of Indonesia to Russia has increased.

Based on Ministry of Trade of the Republic of Indonesia in 2017, Indonesia and Russia recorded a 19.7 percent increase in bilateral trade to $2.5 billion, with around 40 percent of Indonesian exports to Russia being palm oil products. Indonesia has been a particularly tough nut to crack for Russia, with bilateral trade in 2017 at a mere US$3.2 billion, with US$2.4 billion being Indonesian exports. Russian companies have been aiming to build an oil refinery, a power plant and a railway, but each high-level dialogue seems to produce more memoranda and not much actual building. Russian entrepreneurs Small and Medium Enterprises (SMEs) look enthusiastic to conduct trade contacts with partners in Indonesia. They were invited to invest in Indonesia, particularly in the field of agroindustry, fisheries, manufacturing, handicraft and infrastructure. While in the field of trade Indonesia government was offering of Indonesian superior products, among others: crude palm oil, coffee, tea, cocoa, vanilla, furniture, and garments.

Indonesia is one of Russia's investment destinations, such as investing in the construction of an oil refinery worth US$13.5 billion in Tuban. As of March 2024, the project is suspended due to Russo-Ukrainian War.

Indonesia has also become one of the top destinations for Russian tourists. Based on data from the Indonesian Ministry of Tourism and Creative Economy, there were 125,728 Russian tourists to Indonesia in 2018, up 6.51% from 2017. Meanwhile, in the January–November 2019 period, Russian tourists to Indonesia were 170,370 people, up 13.49% from the same period in 2018. On the other hand, not a few Indonesians also visited Russia and the number continued to increase. In addition, there are also many Indonesian students studying in Russia from only 2 people in 1996 to 644 people today.

In the economic sector, the two countries are committed to advancing strategic investment and development projects in various sectors such as infrastructure, energy and transportation, which involve business, regional and people relations in both countries. The Indonesia-Russia Business Forum agreed on 13 economic cooperation in the fields of trade and investment as an effort to strengthen ties between the two countries. In the forum initiated by the Indonesian government in Moscow, it was noted that the cooperation with the highest score was achieved by PT Asia Starch International and PT Dredolf Indonesia worth US$1.10 billion.

Facing the impact of the COVID-19 pandemic, Indonesia and Russia agreed to strengthen their joint commitment to increasing economic cooperation in the fields of trade, investment and industry. This agreement was reached by the two countries at the 4th Meeting of Indonesian – Russian Working Group on Trade, Investment and Industry (WGTII). The 4th Meeting of WGTII discussed various issues, opportunities and breakthroughs to reduce barriers to export / import trade; exploring cooperation in developing strategic industries and handling COVID-19, including cooperation on vaccines; and encouraging increased participation of the business and private sectors in investment projects between the two countries. Indonesia and Russia also agreed to provide support for the settlement of Joint Feasibility Study Group (JFSG) between Indonesia Eurasian Economic Union (EAEU) nations as an effort to establish free trade agreement between Indonesia with the members of the EAEU.

Embassy of Russia, Jakarta

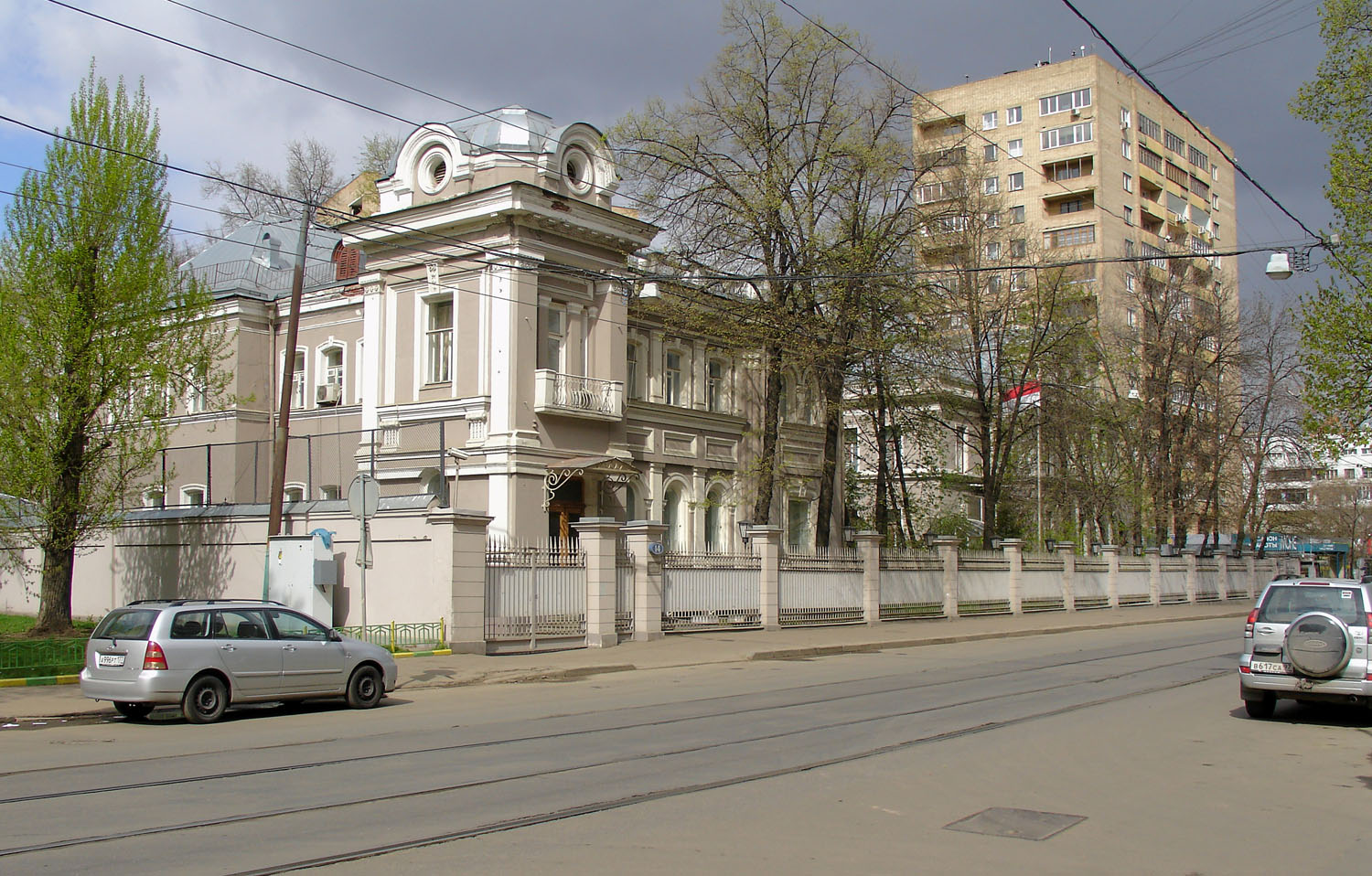
Embassy of Indonesia, Moscow

== See also ==
- Foreign relations of Indonesia
- Foreign relations of Russia
- List of ambassadors of Russia to Indonesia
