= Djauhari Oratmangun =

Indonesian diplomat

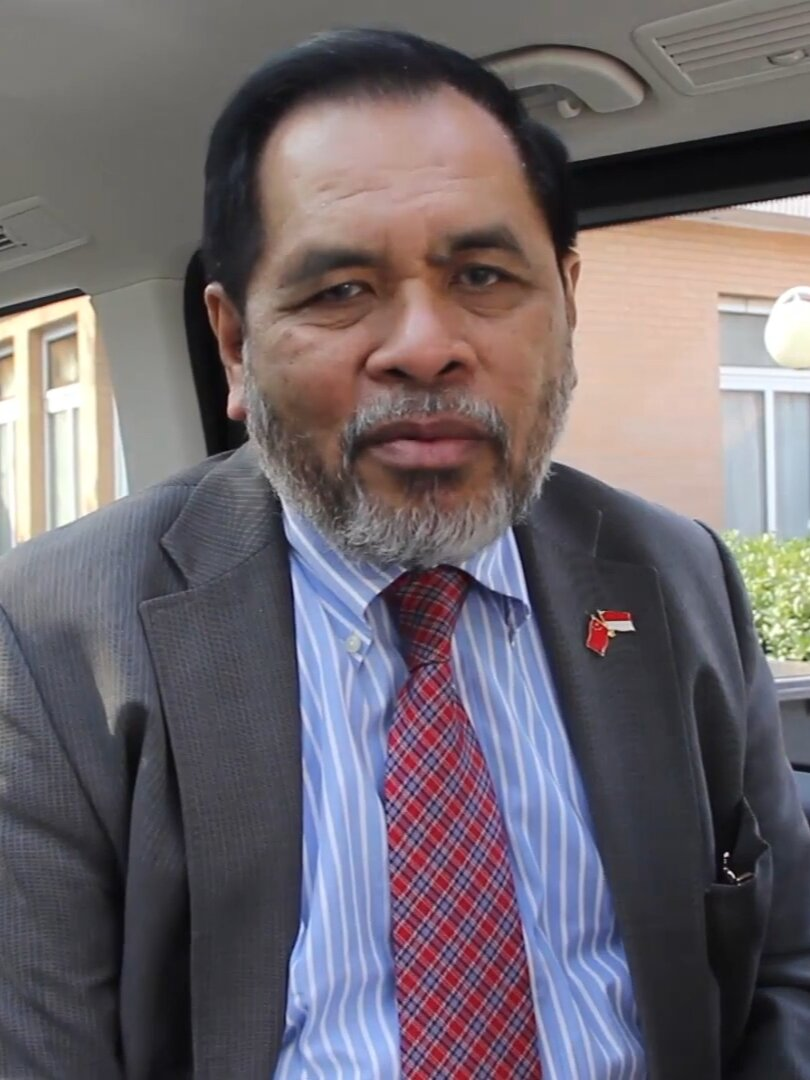
- Djauhari in 2020

Ambassador of Indonesia to China and Mongolia
- Incumbent
- Assumed office 20 February 2018
- President: Joko Widodo; Prabowo Subianto
- Preceded by: Sugeng Rahardjo

Ambassador of Indonesia to Russia and Belarus
- In office 21 December 2011 – 18 March 2016
- President: Susilo Bambang Yudhoyono; Joko Widodo
- Preceded by: Hamid Awaluddin
- Succeeded by: Wahid Supriyadi

Director General of ASEAN Cooperation
- In office 3 November 2008 – 12 April 2012
- Minister: Hassan Wirajuda; Marty Natalegawa
- Preceded by: Dian Triansyah Djani
- Succeeded by: I Gusti Agung Wesaka Puja

Personal details
- Born: July 22, 1957 (age 69) Beo, North Sulawesi, Indonesia
- Spouse: Sih Elsiwi Handayani
- Children: 3
- Parents: Salomon Joseph Lebitduan Oratmangun (father); Ida Frida Ngampas (mother)
- Education: Gadjah Mada University
- Occupation: Diplomat
- Nickname: Joe

Djauhari Oratmangun (born 22 July 1957) is an Indonesian senior diplomat currently serving as the Ambassador of Indonesia to China, with concurrent accreditation to Mongolia since February 2018. He is presently the most senior Indonesian ambassador in active service.

Prior to his posting in Beijing, Djauhari served as the Ambassador to Russia and Belarus (2011–2016) and held the role of Director General of ASEAN Cooperation (2008–2011) during Indonesia's 2011 chairmanship of the regional bloc. His early career included significant multilateral roles at the United Nations in New York and Geneva, as well as deputy chief of mission in the Netherlands, during which the Dutch formally acknowledged Indonesia's 1945 independence date.

== Early life and education ==
Djauhari was born in Beo, a village in the Sangihe Talaud Islands of North Sulawesi, on 22 July 1957. He is the eldest child of Salomon Joseph Lebitduan Oratmangun of the Tanimbar Islands and Ida Frida Ngampas of Minahasa. The parents met while Salomon was teaching at Ratahan, near Ida's hometown. Salomon later shifted career into a politician and became a provincial delegate to the People's Consultative Assembly from the Moluccas and the first regent of Western Southeast Maluku, which was later renamed to the Tanimbar Islands regency.

Djauhari completed his primary education at the Saumlaki school in the Tanimbar Islands and at the Xaverius Primary School in Ambon. Upon completing middle and high school at St. Xaverius in Ambon, Djauhari studied economics at the Gadjah Mada University. While in college, Djauhari lived in the Jesuit-run Realino Student Dormitory. After graduating with a bachelor's degree in 1981, Djauhari aspired to become a diplomat, motivated by the writings of Kompas foreign correspondent Threes Aloysia Santosa on foreign policy and the United Nations.

== Diplomatic career ==
Djauhari briefly worked at the agency for technology and application assessment before joining the diplomatic service in March 1983. Upon completing basic diplomatic education in 1984, Djauhari was assigned to the multilateral economic cooperation directorate. In 1986, he received his first overseas assignment at the permanent mission to the United Nations in New York with responsibilities covering security council matters.

After four years of service in New York, Djauhari returned for a brief stint at the multilateral economic cooperation directorate from 1991 to 1992 before being posted to the economic section at the permanent mission in Geneva. During his tenure in Geneva, Djauhari represented Indonesia in World Trade Organization negotiations. Djauhari also authored a number of op-eds on international trade in Kompas, Jakarta Post, and other publications. By the end of his tenure, Djauhari had reached the diplomatic rank of counsellor. He also took a number of courses on diplomacy during this time, including the foreign ministry's mid-level and senior diplomatic education in 1997 and 2002, respectively.

Around the time of the Fall of Suharto, Djauhari returned to the foreign ministry in Jakarta and took up office as deputy director at the multilateral economic cooperation directorate. In this position, he was responsible for negotiations in the World Trade Organization, UN Trade and Development, and the International Monetary Fund. Following a posting as the chief of economic affairs at the permanent mission in New York from 1999 to 2001, Djauhari was promoted to become the director of multilateral economic cooperation. Following reorganizations within the foreign ministry, on 1 March 2002 he was appointed as the director of United Nations economic and environmental development.

From the foreign ministry, Djauhari was sent to the embassy in the Netherlands, serving as the deputy chief of mission under ambassador Mohammad Jusuf and Junus Effendi Habibie from 2005 to 2009. For 14 months between 2005 and 2006, Djauhari became the embassy's chargé d'affaires ad interim, or acting ambassador. During this time, Djauhari pressured the Dutch government to recognize Indonesia's independence date based on the independence proclamation date on 17 August 1945. Previously, the Dutch recognized Indonesia's independence day as being based on the Dutch–Indonesian Round Table Conference on 27 December 1949, which implied that Indonesia was not a sovereign state throughout the Indonesian National Revolution. The recognition of the 1945 date resulted in an improvement of bilateral relations, which was implemented through a comprehensive partnership agreement in multiple sectors. Djauhari was involved in promoting interfaith relations through the shared history of the two nations.

== Director general of ASEAN cooperation ==
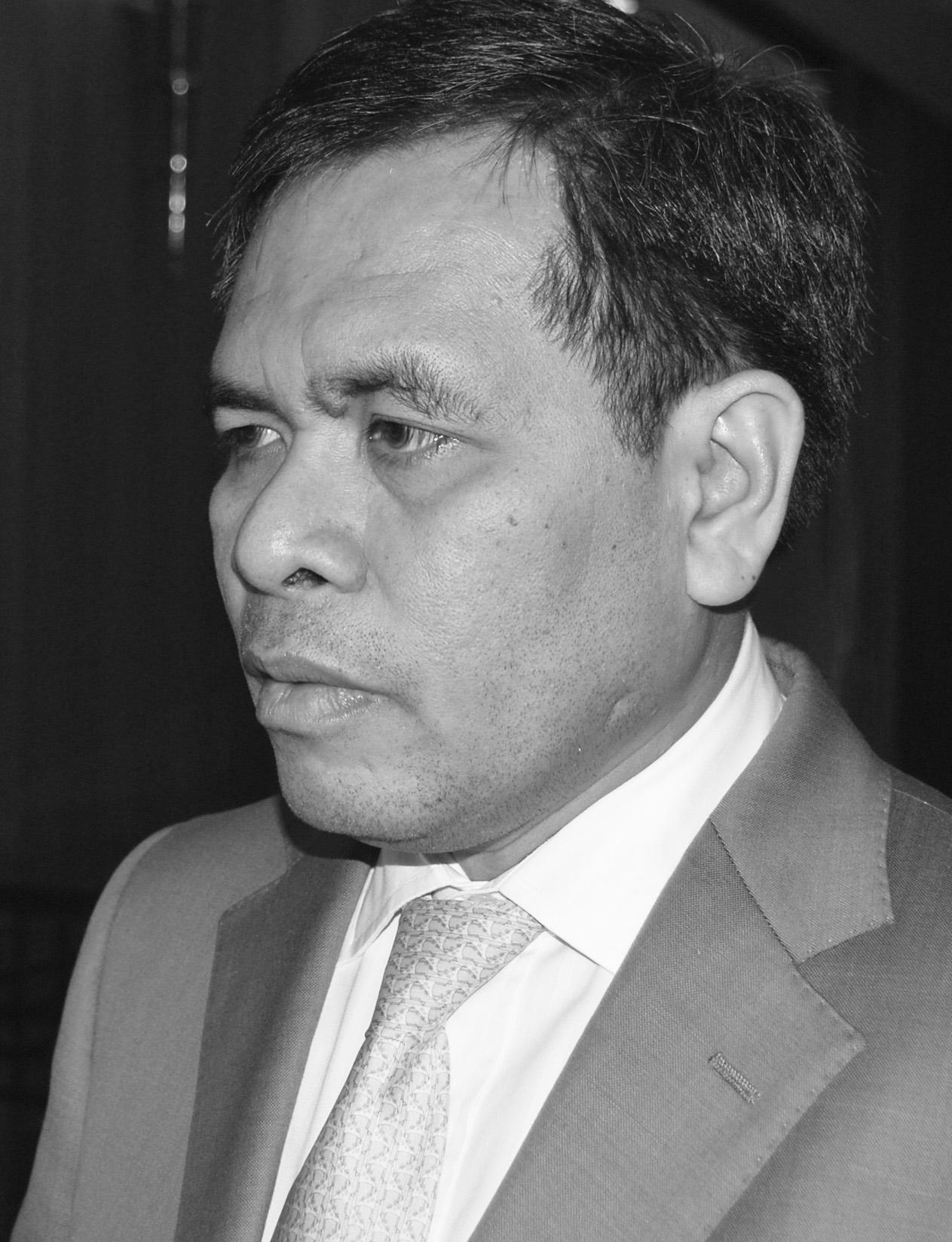
Djauhari Oratmangun in 2009

On 3 November 2008, Djauhari was appointed as the director general of ASEAN cooperation in the foreign ministry, which acted as Indonesia's top official in ASEAN meetings. Following the implementation of the ASEAN Charter, which mandated the presence of the representative of every member country to ASEAN, Djauhari was temporarily designated as Indonesia's representative for a year, before I Gede Ngurah Swajaya took the position in a permanent capacity. Djauhari's tenure saw Indonesia's chairmanship of ASEAN in 2011, during which he faced the challenge of organizing hundreds of large and small meetings as well as visiting ASEAN member and partner states. Djauhari also reached out both government and non-government stakeholders to emphasize the importance of ASEAN. He coordinated ASEAN's tourism forum as well as organizing cultural festivals related to ASEAN in Indonesian cities. As part of promoting tourism, Djauhari put forward the notion for a joint ASEAN visa, which would allow tourist to visit other ASEAN countries after obtaining visa from a single ASEAN member state. Djauhari's role in steering Indonesia's chairmanship also resulted in an implementation agreement on the declaration of conduct of the South China Sea.

== Ambassador to Russia ==
In mid-2011, Djauhari was nominated by president Susilo Bambang Yudhoyono as ambassador to Russia with concurrent accreditation to Belarus. Djauhari passed his assessment by the House of Representative's first commission on 24 August 2011. According to the commission, Djauhari's presentation was as one of the best presentation in comparison to his peers. After he was sworn in on 21 December 2011, he briefly visited his hometown to deliver a general lecture on ASEAN before arriving in Moscow in early February 2012.

Djauhari presented his credentials to president Dmitry Medvedev on 22 February 2012, during which Medvedev proposed a bilateral effort on promoting stability in the Asia Pacific region. Shortly afterwards, Putin replace Medvedev from his presidency and designated deputy prime minister Dmitry Rogozin to handle Indonesian matters in light of the joint Indonesian-Russia commission meeting in June 2012. The appointment was lauded by Djauhari as a demonstration of Russia's strategic partnership with Indonesia. He also presented his credentials to president Alexander Lukashenko of Belarus on 8 October 2012, with plans for a high level visit.

As ambassador, Djauhari aimed to increase the trade volume between Indonesia and Russia two-folds by 2014. He announced plans to establish an instant noodle factory in Russia following requests from Rogozin during the bilateral meetings. He recognized Russia's meager investment and tourism presence in Indonesia, in comparison to other countries, and aimed to increase Russian tourists in places other than Bali, such as to Ambon, Maluku and Yogyakarta.

In 2013, Djauhari was questioned by the Corruption Eradication Commission as a witness for budget misappropriations committed by the foreign ministry's secretary general Sudjadnan Parnohadiningrat between 2004 and 2005.

After Joko Widodo's election as president in 2014, Djauhari urged him to copy Vladimir Putin's development of Russian nationalism. Djauhari was named as a candidate for the foreign ministry and the environment ministry, but did not enter Joko Widodo's cabinet with either positions. Towards the end of his term, on 10 September 2015, Djauhari received an honorary citizenship from the Don State Technical University for his role in bringing Indonesian students to the university and the title of ataman from the Starocherkasskaya stanitsa as the first Indonesian to step foot on the city. On 5 February 2016, Djauhari received a commemorative medal from the deputy chairman of Federation Council Ilyas Umakhanov for his role in developing parliamentary cooperation between the council and Indonesia's Regional Representative Council.

== Ambassador to China ==
Djauhari's tenure in Russia ended with his appointment as the foreign minister's special advisor for strategic issues on 18 March 2016. About a year later, in October 2017 Djauhari was nominated by President Joko Widodo as ambassador to China, with concurrent accreditation to Mongolia. His nomination was responded positively by parliament members, including first commission member Charles Honoris who applauded his views on increasing the number of China's tourists to Indonesia. After passing an assessment by the House of Representative's first commission on 23 October 2017, Djauhari was sworn in for the second time as ambassador on 20 February 2018. He presented his credentials to president Xi Jinping on 8 May, during which Xi expressed his wishes on receiving president Joko Widodo's visit to the country, and to president Khaltmaagiin Battulga of Mongolia on 17 September.

As of 2026, Djauhari is the most senior Indonesian ambassador still in active service, having served for 8 years, 7 months in office.

== Personal life ==
Djauhari is married to Sih Elsiwi Handayani from Kebumen, whom he met while studying in Yogyakarta. At the time of their meeting, Sih was a student at the Yogyakarta Teachers' College. The couple has two sons and a daughter.
