= List of ambassadors of Indonesia to China =

Ambassador of Indonesia to the People's Republic of China
- Seal of the Ministry of Foreign Affairs of Indonesia

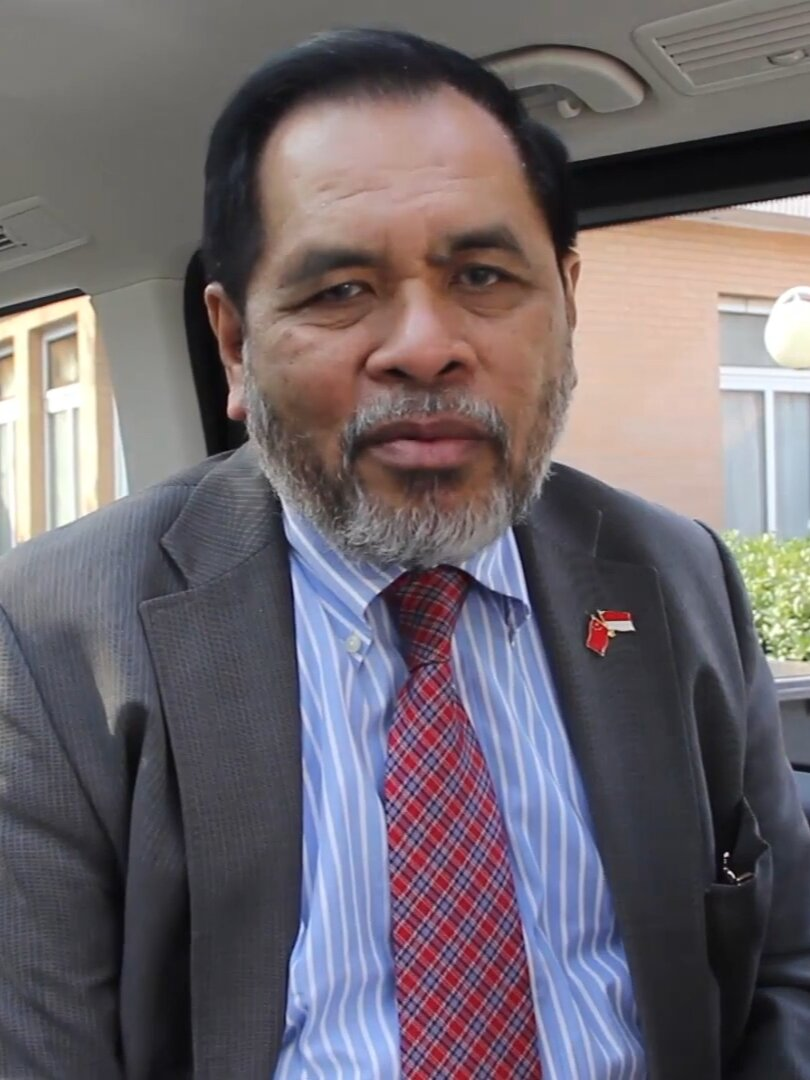
- Incumbent; Djauhari Oratmangun since 20 February 2018
- Residence: Beijing
- Nominator: The president
- Appointer: The president with consideration from the House of Representatives
- Formation: January 1951; 75 years ago
- First holder: Arnold Mononutu
- Website: kemlu.go.id/beijing/tentang-perwakilan/daftar-pejabat-dan-staf

The following lists Indonesian officials who have served as Indonesia's ambassadors to China. This list also includes those who provisionally assume the ambassador's duties as chargé d'affaires ad interim.

Name	Background	Appointment	Presentation of credentials	Termination of mission
Arnold Mononutu	Political appointee	1953	28 October 1953	1956
Sukarjo Wiryopranoto	Political appointee	1956	28 July 1956	1959
Sukarni	Political appointee	1960	27 September 1960	1965
Djawoto	Political appointee	12 February 1964	10 April 1964	16 April 1966
On 23 October 1967 the Indonesian embassy in Beijing was closed; Cambodia serves as the protecting power for Indonesia in China. The Indonesian Embassy was reopened on 29 October 1990 after diplomatic relations was restored.
Abdurrahman Gunadirdja	Career diplomat	24 October 1990	13 November 1990	December 1993
Juwana	Career diplomat	October 1993	29 March 1994	1997
Kuntara	Military	16 July 1997	November 1997	2001
Aa Kustia	Military	23 April 2001	4 July 2001	2005
Sudrajat	Military	11 November 2005	15 March 2006	2010
Imron Cotan	Career diplomat	20 January 2010	30 July 2010	2013
Sugeng Rahardjo	Career diplomat	24 December 2013	20 March 2014	1 December 2017
Djauhari Oratmangun	Career diplomat	20 February 2018	24 April 2018	incumbent

== Chargé d'affaires ad interim ==
During the vacancy between the departure of the outgoing ambassador and th arrival of the incoming ambassador, the embassy is led by the deputy chief of mission. In the absence of the deputy chief of mission, the embassy is instead led by the highest-ranked official in the embassy

Name	Took office	Left office	Permanent office
Izak Mahdi	January 1951	1953	N/A
Baron Sutadisastra	16 April 1966	29 April 1967	economics counsellor
Ali Sabri Sunaryo	29 October 1990	13 November 1990	deputy chief of mission
Wisnu Edi Pratignyo	2013	3 March 2014	deputy chief of mission
Listyowati	1 December 2017	23 April 2018	deputy chief of mission
