= List of ambassadors of Indonesia to Germany =

Ambassador of Indonesia to the Federal Republic of Germany
- Seal of the Ministry of Foreign Affairs of Indonesia

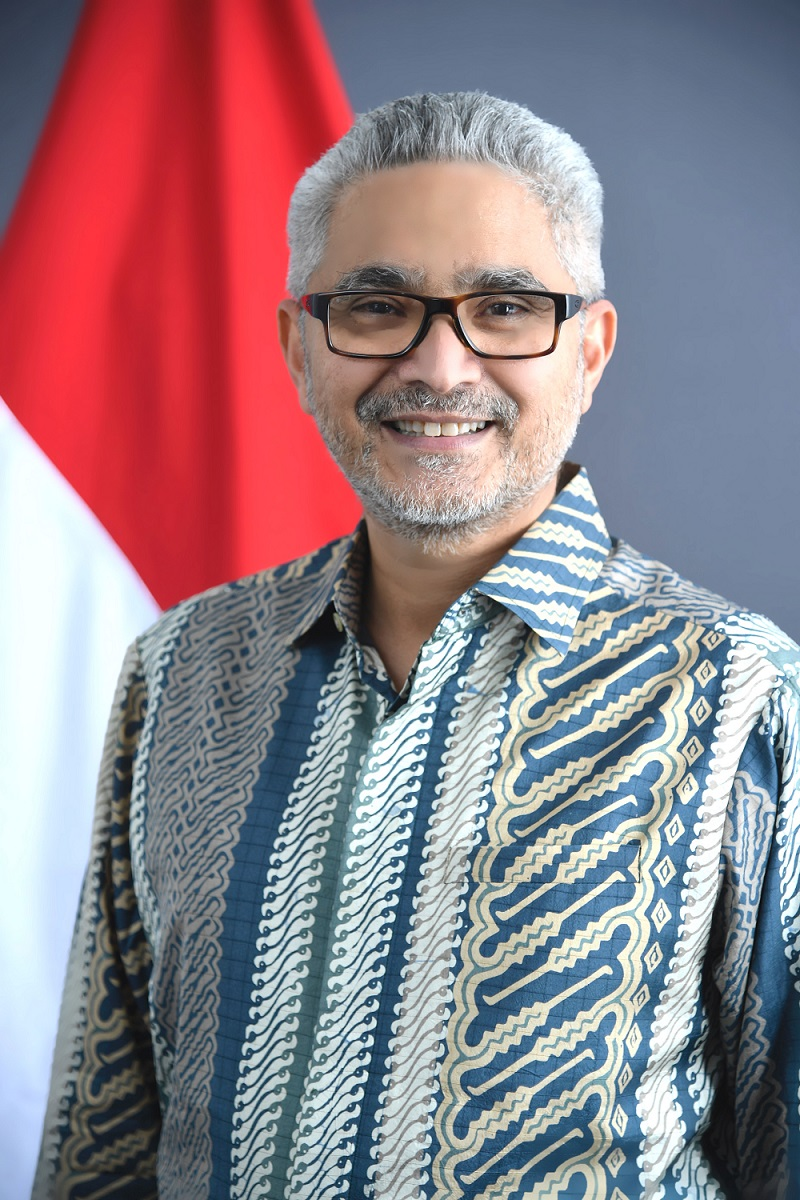
- Incumbent; Abdul Kadir Jailani since 25 August 2025
- Residence: Berlin
- Nominator: The president
- Appointer: The president with consideration from the House of Representatives
- Formation: May 8, 1953; 73 years ago
- First holder: Alexander Andries Maramis
- Website: kemlu.go.id/berlin/tentang-perwakilan/daftar-pejabat-dan-staff

The following lists Indonesian officials who have served as Indonesia's ambassadors to Germany. This list also includes those who provisionally assume the ambassador's duties as chargé d'affaires ad interim as well as the ambassador to the former East Germany. Diplomatic relations between Indonesia and the Federal Republic of Germany (then known as West Germany) were established on 25 June 1952.

Name	Background	Appointment	Presentation of credentials	Termination of mission
Alexander Andries Maramis	Political appointee		8 May 1953	
Zairin Zain	Career diplomat		17 December 1956	
Lukman Hakim	Political appointee		6 May 1961	
Alfian Yusuf Helmi	Career diplomat		7 February 1967	
Jusuf Ismael	Political appointee	1 January 1969	18 April 1969	
Achmad Tirtosudiro	Military		31 July 1973	
Awaloedin Djamin	Military		24 November 1976	
Josef Muskita	Military		3 May 1979	
Ashadi Tjahjadi	Military		16 September 1983	November 1986
Sukardi	Military		18 December 1986	January 1990
Hasjim Djalal	Career diplomat		24 July 1990	January 1994
Hartono Martodiredjo	Military	21 October 1993	21 February 1994	August 1997
Izhar Ibrahim	Career diplomat		15 October 1997	2001
Rahardjo Jamtomo	Career diplomat	18 June 2001	26 September 2001	2004
Makmur Widodo	Career diplomat	7 October 2004	10 January 2005	September 2008
Eddy Pratomo	Career diplomat	20 January 2009	28 April 2009	2013
Fauzi Bowo	Political appointee	24 December 2013	19 February 2014	2017
Arif Havas Oegroseno	Career diplomat	20 February 2018	8 May 2018	December 2024
Abdul Kadir Jailani	Career diplomat	25 August 2025	19 December 2025	incumbent

== Chargé d'affaires ad interim ==
During the vacancy between the departure of the outgoing ambassador and the arrival of the incoming ambassador, the embassy is led by the deputy chief of mission. In the absence of the deputy chief of mission, the embassy is instead led by the highest-ranked official in the embassy.

Name	Took office	Left office	Permanent office
I Gde Djelantik	2004	2005	deputy chief of mission
Fajar Wirawan Harijo	December 2024	5 December 2025	deputy chief of mission

== Ambassador of Indonesia to East Germany ==
Indonesia established its first representative in East Berlin, the capital of the Democratic Republic of Germany (commonly known as East Germany), in the form of a trade mission in 1958. In August 1960, the trade mission became into a consulate general, before being upgraded to an embassy in August 1973. The embassy was closed on 17 January 1991 through a presidential edict.

Name	Background	Appointment	Presentation of credentials	Termination of mission
Suparman	Career diplomat	1 December 1975	22 January 1976	6 March 1979
Mohamad Hasan	Career diplomat		23 April 1979	31 May 1982
Kris Noermattias	Career diplomat	12 June 1982	3 September 1982	23 October 1985
Azhari Boer	Career diplomat		9 January 1986	13 June 1988
I Gusti Ngurah Gedhe	Career diplomat		31 October 1988	17 January 1991
