= Andreano Erwin =

Indonesian diplomat (born 1969)

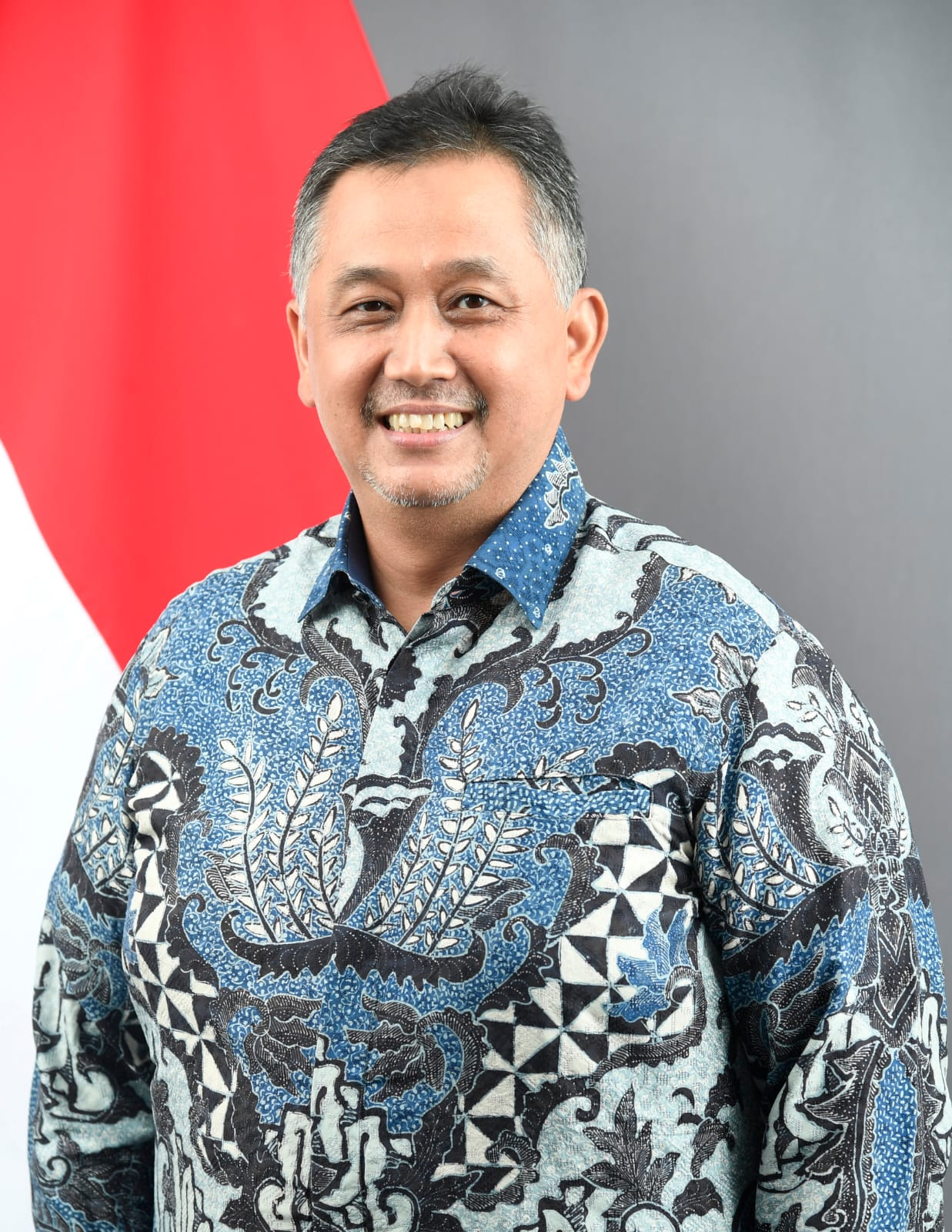

Ambassador of Indonesia to Serbia and Montenegro
- Incumbent
- Assumed office 24 March 2025
- Preceded by: Mochammad Chandra Widya Yudha

Personal details
- Born: 14 January 1969 (age 56)
- Spouse: Dhian Prihandini
- Children: 2
- Education: Trisakti University; University of Indonesia

Andreano Erwin (born 14 January 1969) is an Indonesian diplomat currently serving as the ambassador to Serbia with concurrent accreditation to Montenegro since 2025. Prior to his appointment, he was the chief of the foreign cooperation bureau within the health ministry and director for territorial law and treaties within the foreign ministry.

== Life and education ==
Born on 14 January 1969 into a family of diplomats, Andreano moved frequently between countries during his childhood. He attended school in multiple nations, including Czechoslovakia, Russia, and the Netherlands. Despite his itinerant youth, which he described as "not pleasant" for a child, he chose to attend university in Indonesia, where his parents were stationed at the time. He completed a bachelor's degree in international law at Trisakti University. After joining at the foreign ministry, he completed a master's degree in international relations from the University of Indonesia in 2000. Andreano is married to Dhian Prihandini and has two children.

== Career ==
Andreano established a general trading company with friends, successfully securing a role as a supplier to major corporations. However, a crisis in 1996 led to the company's bankruptcy, prompting him to join the foreign department on the same year based on his parents' suggestion. Early in his career, he was assigned to the directorate of ASEAN economic cooperation. After earning his master's degree, he served at the consulate general in Penang for three and a half years from 2001 to 2004, where he handled matters relating to bilateral economic relations, development, and migrant workers.

He returned to the foreign ministry in 2004 to work in the directorate of political and regional treaties before being posted to the political section of the permanent representative to the United Nations in New York with the rank of first secretary. During his assignment in New York, Andreano was responsible on matters relating to law of the sea, global counterterrorism, bilateral and legal matters within the United Nations General Assembly and the Security Council. He attended a session of the United Nations Commission on International Trade Law in 2008, during which he lauded the commission's effort in finalizing the draft convention on contracts for the international carriage of goods by sea.

Andreano continued his career in handling maritime treaties and border diplomacy with his appointment as deputy director (chief of subdirectorate) that handles health cooperation within the directorate of treaties on economic, social and cultural affairs from 2012 to 2014 and deputy director for territorial treaties within the directorate of political, security and territorial treaties from 2014 to 2015. From 2015 to 2017, Andreano became the assistant to the President's special envoy for the Indonesia-Malaysia maritime boundaries, Eddy Pratomo. He officially ended his tenure as assistant special envoy on 6 January 2017.

Between January 2017 to August 2018, Andreano was the deputy chief of mission at the embassy in Kuala Lumpur. He was the chargé d'affaires ad interim of the embassy from 30 January to 31 July. Around his time as the embassy's chargé d'affaires ad interim, Andreano handled the assassination of Kim Jong-nam, which was unknowingly conducted by Siti Aisyah, an Indonesian citizen. Andreano provided legal support to Siti Aisyah on behalf of the embassy and was given access to met Siti at the Cyberjaya Police's detention facility in Selangor. Andreano attended Siti's trial at the Sepang District Court, in which the embassy provided five lawyers to defend Siti Aisyah. Andreano had visited Siti a total of four times, and it was only after his fourth visit that Siti realized that she had murdered Kim Jong-nam after his delegation showed her a newspaper on Kim Jong-nam's death.

From August 2018 to June 2020, Andreano became the deputy permanent representative to the United Nations in Geneva. He was elected into a number of ad-hoc positions within the United Nations organ, such as vice-chair of the 2018 Biological Weapons Convention Meeting of States Parties and the co-chair of the Bali Process on People Smuggling, Trafficking in Persons and Related Transnational Crime in 2019. Andreano also defended Indonesia's human rights condition in United Nations Human Rights Council sessions, stating that human rights incidents regarding Papuans have been resolved and invited the United Nations High Commissioner for Human Rights to visit Papua to observe the human rights situation in the province.

Andreano was installed as the health ministry's chief of foreign cooperation bureau on 20 November 2020. In the midst of the ongoing COVID-19 pandemic in Indonesia at that time, Andreano was responsible in coordinating contacts with countries to obtain vaccine. Andreano warned Indonesian regional governments to not import vaccines without coordination with the central government.

On 9 March 2022, Andreano became the director of legal affairs and territorial treaties within the foreign ministry. Several months later, on 5 October 2022 Andreano on behalf of the Indonesian government signed "The Principles and Guidelines" alongside his Philippines counterpart Maria Angela Ponce. The document marked the start of delimitation between Indonesia and Philippines continental shelf boundary following a landmark agreement in 2014 to delimit their exclusive economic zones (EEZs).

In August 2024, President Joko Widodo nominated Andreano as Indonesia's ambassador to Serbia, with concurrent accreditation to Montenegro. He passed a fit and proper test held by the House of Representative's first commission in September that year and was installed by President Prabowo Subianto on 24 March 2025. He presented his credentials to President of Serbia Aleksandar Vučić on 7 July 2025 and to President of Montenegro Jakov Milatović on 8 September 2025.
