= Havid Abdulgani =

Indonesian diplomat (born 1930)

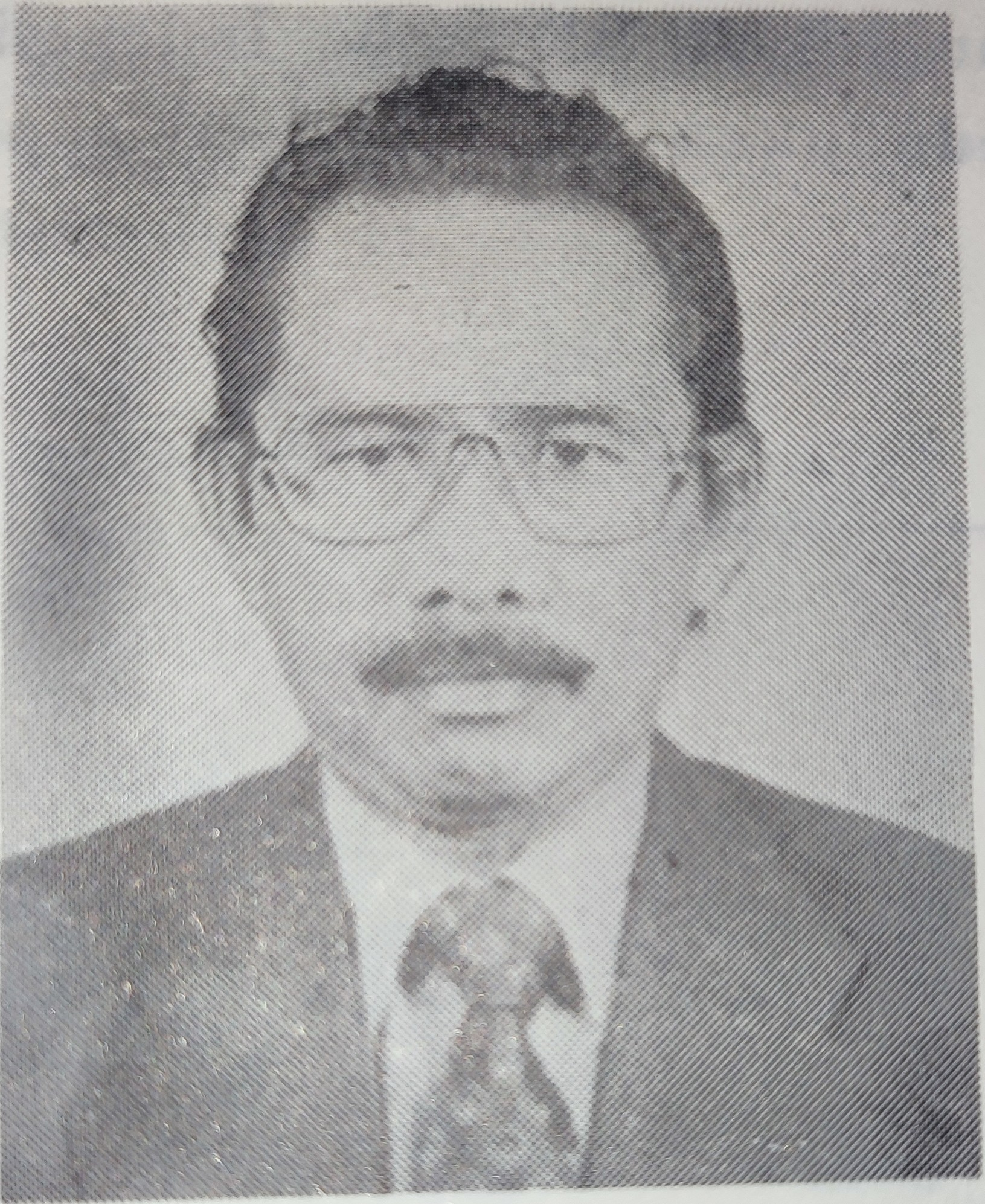

Ambassador of Indonesia to Afghanistan
- In office 1989 – 1996; Charge d’Affaires a.i. until 1993
- Preceded by: Abdurrahman Gunadirdja (as ambassador); Abdullah Fuad Rachman (previous charge d’Affaires a.i.)
- Succeeded by: Alwi Anas

Personal details
- Born: July 12, 1930 (age 96) Sumbawa, West Nusa Tenggara, Dutch East Indies
- Children: 3
- Education: Gajah Mada University (Drs.)

Havid Abdulgani (born 12 July 1930) is an Indonesian career diplomat who was known for leading Indonesia's diplomatic mission in Afghanistan as chargé d'affaires ad interim, and later, ambassador, from 1989 to 1996.

== Early life, education, and personal life ==
Havid Abdulgani is born on 12 July 1930, in Sumbawa, West Nusa Tenggara. He received his doctorandus in international relations in 1962. Havid, who is married and has three children, is a Muslim.

== Diplomatic career ==
Havid began his diplomatic career in 1963. Upon completing basic diplomatic education in 1966, he received his first overseas assignment in 1972, when he was deployed to the embassy in Moscow, Soviet Union, with the rank of third secretary. Following his time in Moscow, he returned to domestic duties briefly before being stationed in the planning directorate in 1977. His next foreign assignment came in 1979, when he was posted to the embassy in Baghdad, Iraq, where he held the rank of first secretary.

His diplomatic service subsequently took him to North America in 1982, when he was transferred to the consulate general in New York to serve as consul with the rank of counsellor. Returning to Jakarta, Abdulgani was appointed to work within the foreign department's bureau of personnel as head of personnel rotations in 1985. During this period, he completed senior diplomatic education in 1986.

He was then seconded to the office of the Coordinating Minister for Political and Security Affairs as the deputy assistant for European and America region in 1987. After a brief stint as deputy assistant for ASEAN and Southeast Asia regional resilience, with him being sworn in for the role on 11 September 1989, on December the same year he was posted to the Indonesian embassy in Kabul as chargé d'affaires ad interim, with his appointment marking the official re-opening of the embassy. Four years into his interim leadership, his status was officially upgraded to ambassador with a swearing in ceremony along with other ambassadors on 8 April 1993. A month later, the Union of Sumbawa students in Bandung floated his name as a possible candidate to replace incumbent governor Warsito. He served until 1996. After his retirement, the government appointed him as the deputy chairman of a taskforce to protect Indonesia's interests following the 1999 East Timorese independence referendum. Havid then entered business as a member of the board of commissioners of Indonesia Prima Property since 1998 and Polychem Indonesia since June 2004.
