= Maruli Tua Sagala =

Indonesian diplomat (1956–2023)

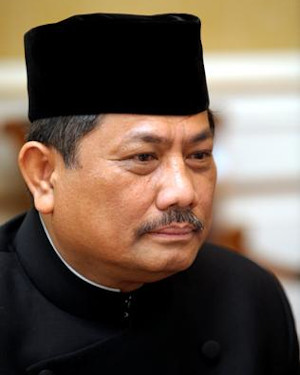

Ambassador of Indonesia to Hungary
- In office 10 August 2010 – 2014
- President: Susilo Bambang Yudhoyono
- Preceded by: Mangasi Sihombing
- Succeeded by: Wening Esthyprobo

Personal details
- Born: June 20, 1956 Samosir, North Sumatra Indonesia
- Died: October 25, 2023 (aged 67)
- Spouse: Elita Gultom
- Children: 3
- Education: Padjadjaran University (Drs.)

Maruli Tua Sagala (20 June 1956 – 25 October 2023) was an Indonesian diplomat who served as the ambassador of Indonesia to Hungary and North Macedonia, resident in Budapest, from 2010 until 2014. A graduate of the Padjadjaran University, Maruli served in both domestic and foreign posting, with his two final postings being the secretary of the America and Europe directorate general and deputy chief of mission at the embassy in France.

== Early life and education ==
Maruli Tua Sagala was born on 20 June 1956 in Samosir. He studied journalism at the Padjadjaran University in Bandung, later becoming the chairman of his faculty's student senate (Unpad). His peers from this period remembered him as a generous and supportive colleague.

== Diplomatic career ==
Maruli's diplomatic career began in 1980 as a staff member for the foreign department's directorate in Jakarta. He was promoted to the ASEAN and Asia Pacific section within the directorate after three years of working, before being sent for a diplomatic intership at the embassy in Washington, D.C. in 1984. He served in the political section with the diplomatic rank of attaché, before being promoted to the diplomatic rank of third secretary in 1985. He was subsequently moved to the protocol and section, working there from 1986 to 1988. During this period, he received specialized training in American politics and foreign policy at the Johns Hopkins University School of Advanced International Studies in 1985 and took part in the Third Annual Asian Embassies Congressional Seminar organized by the Asia Foundation in 1986.

Returning to Jakarta in 1990, Maruli became the chief of development and planning at the Indonesia's ASEAN national secretariat until 1991. He was then posted to New Delhi, India, from 1992 to 1996, where he was became the embassy's spokesperson (information chief) with the diplomatic rank of counsellor. Upon his return to the national secretariat in Jakarta, he took on the role of chief of administration from 1997 to 1998. He was later entrusted to become the head of the ASEAN cooperation enhancement project from 1998 to 1999. In 1998, while serving in these capacities, he led the Indonesian delegation to the ASEAN Budget Committee conference in Singapore.

From 2000 to 2004, Maruli was stationed at the embassy in Moscow, serving as the chief of politics with the diplomatic rank of minister counsellor. He was sent to Chechnya as an observer for its 2003 presidential election. He then returned to Jakarta as the chief of program planning and legislations at the secretariat of the American and Europe directorate general for a few months, before being promoted to lead the entire secretariat on 31 August 2004. In his capacity, he represented Indonesia as a speaker at the Indonesia-USA Security Dialogue in 2005. He became the acting director general of America and Europe in 2006, where one of his acts was to sign a 51 million euro (US$52 million) financial assistance from Germany in February that year. Maruli was then posted to the embassy in Paris, France, where he served as deputy chief of mission under ambassador Arizal Effendi. Following the death of Arizal on 8 December 2008, Maruli became the embassy's chargé d'affaires ad interim until the arrival of the new ambassador Rezlan Ishar Jenie in 2010. As the chargé d'affaires ad interim, he headed the Indonesian delegation at the International Conference in Support of Afghanistan in 2008 and the International Conference on Access to Civil Nuclear Energy in 2010.

Maruli was installed as Indonesia's ambassador to Hungary and Macedonia on 10 August 2010 after passing a parliamentary assessment in early May of that year. His duties began with a presentation of credentials to president Pál Schmitt of Hungary on 15 November 2010 and president Gjorge Ivanov of Macedonia on 25 March 2011. In March 2013, Maruli received the state visit of Indonesia's president Susilo Bambang Yudhoyono to Hungary. Maruli's term ended in 2014 and he retired at his residence in Ciputat, Bintaro. In his retirement, he supported Batak customary events through his role as an advisor to the union of the Sagala clan in the Jakarta metropolitan area.

== Personal life ==
Maruli is married to Elita Gultom and has three children.

Maruli died on 25 October 2023. Following his death, traditional Batak funeral rites, including the Tonggoraja and Adat ceremonies, were held the day after, before his remains were transported to his ancestral village in Huta Sagala for final burial.
