= Arif Havas Oegroseno =

Indonesian diplomat (born 1963)

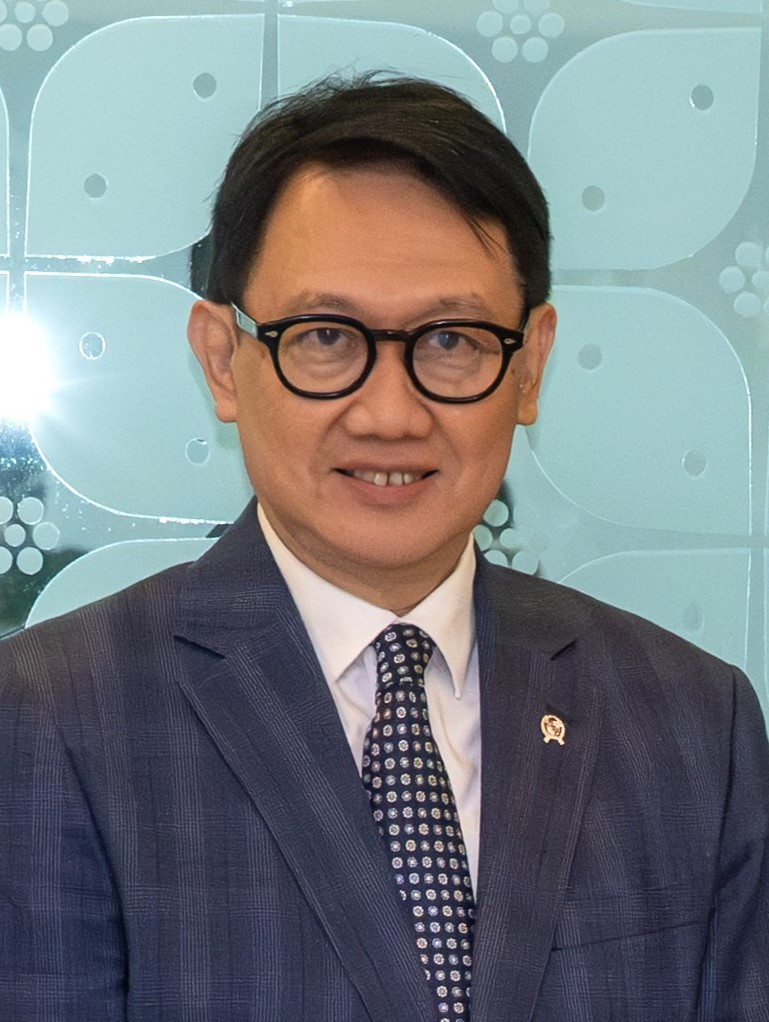

Vice Minister of Foreign Affairs
- Incumbent
- Assumed office 21 October 2024 Serving with Anis Matta and Arrmanatha Nasir (until 2026)
- President: Prabowo Subianto
- Preceded by: Pahala Mansury

Ambassador of Indonesia to Germany
- In office 20 February 2018 – December 2024
- President: Joko Widodo
- Preceded by: Fauzi Bowo
- Succeeded by: Fajar Wirawan Harijo (acting); Abdul Kadir Jailani

Deputy for Maritime Sovereignty of the Coordinating Ministry for Maritime Affairs
- In office 12 June 2015 – 16 April 2018
- Preceded by: Position established
- Succeeded by: Purbaya Yudhi Sadewa

Ambassador of Indonesia to Belgium, Luxembourg, and the European Union
- In office 10 August 2010 – January 2015
- President: Susilo Bambang Yudhoyono; Joko Widodo
- Preceded by: Nadjib Riphat Kesoema
- Succeeded by: Yuri Octavian Thamrin

Director General for International Law and Treaties
- In office 3 November 2008 – September 2010
- Preceded by: Eddy Pratomo
- Succeeded by: Linggawaty Hakim

Personal details
- Born: 12 March 1963 (age 63) Semarang, Central Java, Indonesia
- Spouse: Sartika Oegroseno
- Children: 2
- Parents: Amir Fattah (father); Yuniarti (mother)
- Education: Diponegoro University (SH); Harvard Law School (LLM)
- Profession: Diplomat

Arif Havas Oegroseno (born 12 March 1963) is an Indonesian diplomat who is currently serving as the vice foreign minister of Indonesia since 21 October 2024. Prior to his current position, Arif was posted as ambassador to Germany from 2018 and 2024 and as ambassador to Belgium and the European Union from 2010 to 2014.

Born and raised in Semarang, he graduated with a law degree from Diponegoro University in 1986 before joining the foreign ministry. After earning a Master of Laws from Harvard Law School in 1992 and passing the bar in Texas, his career brought him to Geneva and Lisbon, where he worked to restore bilateral relations with Portugal during the latter.

Throughout the 2000s, Oegroseno emerged as a key figure in Indonesia's territorial and maritime diplomacy, serving as director, and then director general responsible for matters pertaining to international law and treaties. He led technical negotiations over the Ambalat block dispute with Malaysia and helped secure landmark agreements. He was then appointed as ambassador to Belgium, Luxembourg, and the European Union in 2010, where he utilized "Tintin diplomacy" to promote tourism, before returning to Jakarta in 2015 to serve as deputy for maritime sovereignty. In 2018, he was appointed ambassador to Germany, a post he held until his appointment as vice foreign minister in 2024.

== Early life and education ==
Arif was born on 12 March 1963 in Semarang. Arif's father, Amir Fattah, hailed from Kebumen and worked as a civil servant within the Central Java provincial government, while his mother, Yuniarti, originated from Surabaya and worked as a pharmacist in a medical factory. Arif's parents met during their studies at the Gadjah Mada University. The family lived at a small house on the outskirts of Semarang. Arif spent his childhood, from elementary to high school, in Semarang. In a later interview in 2025, Arif stated that his family instilled gender equality to him, as he was surrounded by working women in his extended family. He noted that his mother was the stricter disciplinarian regarding his education, particularly in mathematics. Arif helped his family sell ice pops at his elementary school, which earned him a small amount of money. His friends would often come by to his house to collect samples of frogs for biology class experiments due to its proximity with rice fields.

Upon completing high school, Arif applied to study economics and law at the Diponegoro University (Undip) and the economics and political science major at the Gadjah Mada University (UGM). Having failed to enter economics at UGM and Undip, he planned to apply for private college before being informed by his friend about his acceptance to Undip in law. During his undergraduate years, Arif was mentored by Muladi, who was then the vice dean of the law faculty and, coincidentally, his father's karate friend. After a period of academic struggle and "rebellious" behavior, Arif excelled in his later years and chose to specialize in international law in his third year. At that time, international law was unpopular among law students due to the difficulty and the mostly English language textbooks. He took a particular interest in aviation law and wrote his thesis on the legal implications of direct broadcasting satellites and the Palapa satellite's signal "spillover" into neighboring countries. He graduated in 1986.

== Diplomatic career ==
=== Joining the foreign ministry ===
After graduating, Arif applied to different companies in Jakarta and received a lucrative job offer from the oil company Caltex in Rumbai, Riau to manage immigration for their expatriates. He was flown to Rumbai with Caltex's private jet for a job interview but turned down the offer because he did not wish to work in immigration law. He then returned to his alma mater, where he saw information regarding the foreign ministry's direct recruitment program in the university. Arif was told by Muladi, who overheard his complaints regarding the program's administrative requirements, to apply for the program.

For his application, Arif was interviewed by two visiting ambassadors: Isslamet Poernomo (ambassador to Kenya) and Abdurrahman Gunadirdja (ambassador to China). Unlike his peers who gave positive cliché answers when asked about their motivation to join the foreign ministry, Arif stated that he wanted to reinforce Indonesia's weak diplomacy and questioned prevailing diplomatic strategies regarding East Timor. Due to his combative answers, Arif was initially pessimistic about his chances, but he was somehow accepted. Although his father urged him to change his mind on Caltex's offer, his mother's advice solidified his intentions to join the diplomatic service.

Arif joined the foreign ministry on the same year after he graduated and underwent basic diplomatic education at the foreign ministry's Indonesian Foreign Service School from 1986 to 1987. Arif was heavily influenced by ideological mentors such as Hasjim Djalal and Etty Agoes during his diplomatic education, which shifted his focus towards maritime law and Indonesia's archipelagic state identity.

=== Initial assignment ===
Arif began his career in the diplomatic service as a junior diplomat assigned to the Middle East directorate, serving until 1990. In 1991, Arif pursued further studies in the United States. Despite his college record that included a very bad score in English, he achieved a TOEFL score of 647 and was accepted into both Columbia and Harvard Law School. He chose Harvard and graduated with a Master of Laws (LL.M.) in 1992. Before returning to Indonesia, Arif took a one-year leave and briefly worked in the legal advice department at Bracewell & Paterson in Houston from 1992 to 1993. Despite his short stint, he passed the bar and became a lawyer.

From Houston, Arif undertook his first overseas posting at the Indonesian permanent mission in Geneva, where he served from 1993 to 1997. Indonesia's human rights record was marred due to incidents of violence in East Timor, and Arif had to defend Indonesia's stance on the issue in UN forums. During this period, Arif wrote several op-eds regarding human rights at The Jakarta Post. Arif returned to Jakarta to serve as the chief of humanitarian affairs section within the international organisations directorate of the foreign ministry from 1997 to 1998.

Around that time, Indonesia was in the process of re-establishing diplomatic relations with Portugal, which had been strained due to Indonesia's annexation of East Timor. The thaw was the result of informal talks between Portugal's prime minister Antonio Guterres and Indonesia's president Suharto during the ASEAN-EU meeting in Bangkok. Further negotiations during the Habibie regime resulted in an agreement for the establishment of an interest section, with Indonesia being represented by the Thailand embassy in Portugal as its protecting power. In December 1998, the foreign ministry's director general for political affairs Nugroho Wisnumurti stated that the interest section would be headed by Rezlan Ishar Jenie, assisted by the-then more junior Arif.

The interests section was opened on 15 January 1999, and the two diplomats began their duties several days later. Early into their term, the two diplomats were accused as military intelligence officers by the Timorese diaspora. The accusations were summarily rebuked by their Portuguese counterpart in Jakarta, Ana Gomes, who called upon the community to be more accommodative and tolerant towards the Indonesian diplomats. During his tenure, Arif and Havas worked to mend relations between the two countries through audiences with Portuguese politicians and cultural promotion. Arif described his posting in Lisbon as the most difficult throughout his diplomatic career.

By August, Arif was promoted to the diplomatic rank of first secretary, and by December the interest section was upgraded into a full-fledged embassy with Rezlan as the chargé d'affaires ad interim. Arif was put in charge of information and socio cultural affairs within the embassy and served until 2002. Bilateral relations grew warmer following Timor-Leste's independence, with a twenty-fold increase in Portuguese tourist presence in Indonesia. Arif organized Indonesian cultural week and movie festival in Lisabon, which garnered significant attention from the Portuguese populace. Before leaving Portugal, Arif was gifted a copy of Os Lusíadas by Luís de Camões from the Portuguese government.

=== International treaties and border dispute roles ===
From Portugal, Arif returned to the foreign ministry, where he served as the director of political, security, and territorial treaties since 31 December 2003. Arif represented Indonesia in UN legal committee debates, where he emphasized Indonesia's role in counterterrorism and urged the formulation of a legal instrument to ban human cloning.

Early in his term, Arif faced Malaysia's territorial claims on the Ambalat blocks in the Celebes Sea. Arif meticulously crafted Indonesia's legal defense against the claims, stating that Indonesia's position has been consistent with the relevant international territorial laws and legal precedents. Arif also took a course on border delimitations at the International Boundaries Research, Durham University, under the purview of prominent border scholars such as David Anderson, Rodman Bondy, Morris Mandelson, and Fox Smith. During his studies, he examined and researched border dispute cases similar to the Ambalat dispute. Arif then led the Indonesian technical team to negotiate on the issue in 2005, but failed to reach a binding agreement.

Arif also played a lead role in negotiating international treaties, such as maritime boundary treaty with Malaysia in 2004, extradition treaty with Singapore in 2005, and the landmark Lombok Treaty with Australia in 2006. Arif has expressed concerns regarding the extradition treaty with Singapore, as it allows for the return of individuals but lacks provisions for bringing back their illegally obtained wealth. Between 2007 and 2008, Arif spearheaded talks regarding similar extradition treaties with Hong Kong and China.

In December 2004, following the assassination of human rights activist Munir Said Thalib on a flight from Jakarta to Amsterdam, Arif was appointed as part of a team to investigate his death. Arif, alongside with other diplomats within the team such as Retno Marsudi and Abdul Kadir Jailani, worked to obtain legal assistance from the Dutch government for the investigation.

On 3 November 2008, Arif was named as the director general of international affairs and legal treaties, replacing Eddy Pratomo who was appointed as ambassador to Germany. During this time, Arif was regarded by observers to be part of "Hassan's boys", a group of rising young diplomats slated by foreign minister Hassan Wirajuda to take over leadership of the ministry within the near future. As director general, Arif led the Indonesian party in renewed talks regarding the Ambalat bloc dispute, but predicted that it would take at least 30 years to resolve the issue due to its complexity. Shortly before the end of his term, in June 2010 Arif was elected as the president of the 20th Meeting of States Parties to UNCLOS.

== Ambassador to Belgium and the European Union ==
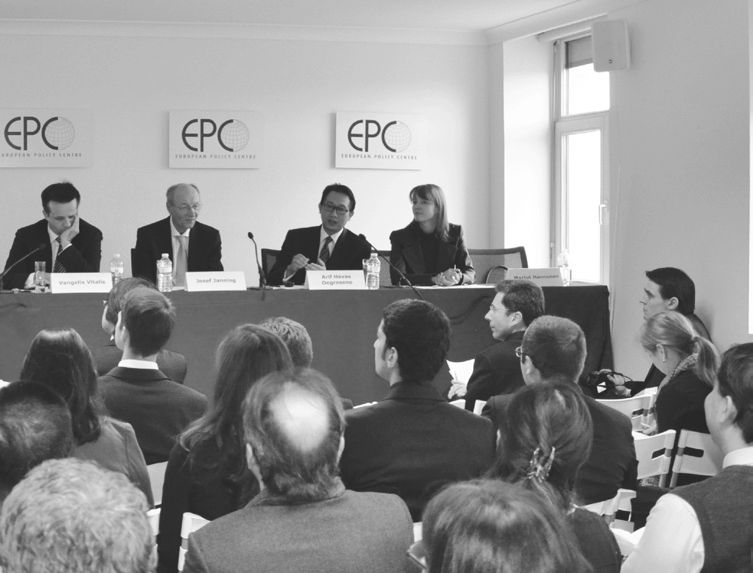
Arif (second from right) at a talkshow in Belgium in 2011.

Arif was nominated by President Susilo Bambang Yudhoyono as ambassador to Belgium and the European Union, with concurrent accreditation to Luxemburg. He passed an assessment by the House of Representative's first commission on 3 May 2010 and was sworn in on 10 August. He arrived in Brussels on 15 September and presented his credentials to King Albert II of Belgium and President of the European Commission José Manuel Barroso on 24 November 2010. During the ceremony, Arif gifted the Flight 714 to Sydney Tintin comic to King Albert II, a gesture later described as "Tintin diplomacy". The edition was described by Arif as a tourism promotion tool, as it introduced Indonesian geographical and cultural diversity. Arif later stated that the embassy sought permission from publishers of Tintin to use the comic to promote Indonesian tourism in Belgium. The next year, he presented his credentials to President of the European Council Herman Van Rompuy on 11 January and Grand-Duke Henry of Luxembourg on 5 May.

As ambassador, Arif led efforts to recover Indonesian assets that were misappropriated and stored in Europe as part of the Indonesian Asset Recovery Task Force. He also became a member of the Intellectual Property Rights National Task Force. One of Arief's major work was the development of the Belgian Blue cow breed in Indonesia, which was a result of a visit by Indonesia's animal husbandry director general to Belgium in 2013, and the entry into force of the European Union (EU) and Indonesian Partnership and Cooperation Agreement on 1 May 2014. During an exhibition held at the Royal Palace of Brussels to introduce Asian musical instruments in September 2013, Arif startled visitors by personally performing the Balinese Topeng Keras dance during Indonesia's showcase.

Around September 2014, Arif was named as a strong contender to lead the foreign ministry, alongside Retno Marsudi and Yuri Octavian Thamrin. Retno was eventually appointed for the post. Arif's mission in Brussels was terminated in January 2015.

== Deputy of maritime sovereignty ==
From Belgium, Arif returned to Indonesia in November 2014. He was appointed as deputy for maritime sovereignty in the maritime coordinating ministry on 12 June 2015. In 2016, Arif was nominated as a judge to the International Tribunal for the Law of the Sea, becoming the first Indonesian to be nominated for the post. On the same year, Arif stated that it is impossible for parties involved in the South China Sea territorial dispute to reach a resolution and argued managing the dispute as the most realistic goal. Arif handed over his duties as deputy to maritime coordinating minister Luhut Binsar Pandjaitan on 16 April 2018, who then appointed Purbaya Yudhi Sadewa to fill the post about a month later.

== Ambassador to Germany ==
In early October 2017, Arif was nominated by President Joko Widodo as ambassador to Germany. His nomination was responded positively by parliament members, including first commission member Charles Honoris who applauded his seniority and expertise in international law. After passing an assessment by the House of Representative's first commission on 23 October 2017, Arif was sworn in for the second time as ambassador on 20 February 2018. He arrived in Germany on 18 April and presented his credentials to president Frank-Walter Steinmeier on 8 May.

As ambassador, Arif stated his focus on developing economic cooperation between the two countries, emphasizing the status of both countries as major powers within their respective regions. Arif conducted assessments on potential exports to Germany, especially in the automotive sector, in order to reduce Indonesia's trade deficit with Germany. To promote Indonesia's trade potential in Germany, Arif secured Indonesia's status as a primary partner for Hannover Messe, one of Germany's largest trade fair, between 2020 and 2023. In a press statement, Arif remarked that Indonesia's partnership with Hannover Messe was the longest in its history.

In July 2018, Arif began provisioning population identification numbers to longtime Indonesian residents in Germany, which allowed them to regain their civil rights when returning to Indonesia. Arif commenced the construction of a permanent, independent embassy building in 2021, replacing the rented premises used since the reunification of Germany. The land had been secured by 2019, but construction was stalled due to paperwork. Construction was finished in June 2024, and the building was opened in October of the same year.

== Vice foreign minister ==
After more than a decade of ambassadorial tenure, on 21 October 2024 Arif was installed as the vice foreign minister. According to Arif, he was shocked to be informed of the appointment directly by the president, as he was driving by himself at Berlin's autobahn. He immediately departed for Jakarta the morning after. His appointment came as a surprise to observers, as he was never summoned by Prabowo to his residence in Hambalang like other cabinet members. He was still en route to Jakarta by the time Prabowo announced his name as vice foreign minister and made his maiden appearance when he and other vice ministers were installed the next day. In a meeting with the House of Representative's first commission on December that year, Arif was assigned by foreign minister Sugiono to handle bilateral relation and international treaty matters.

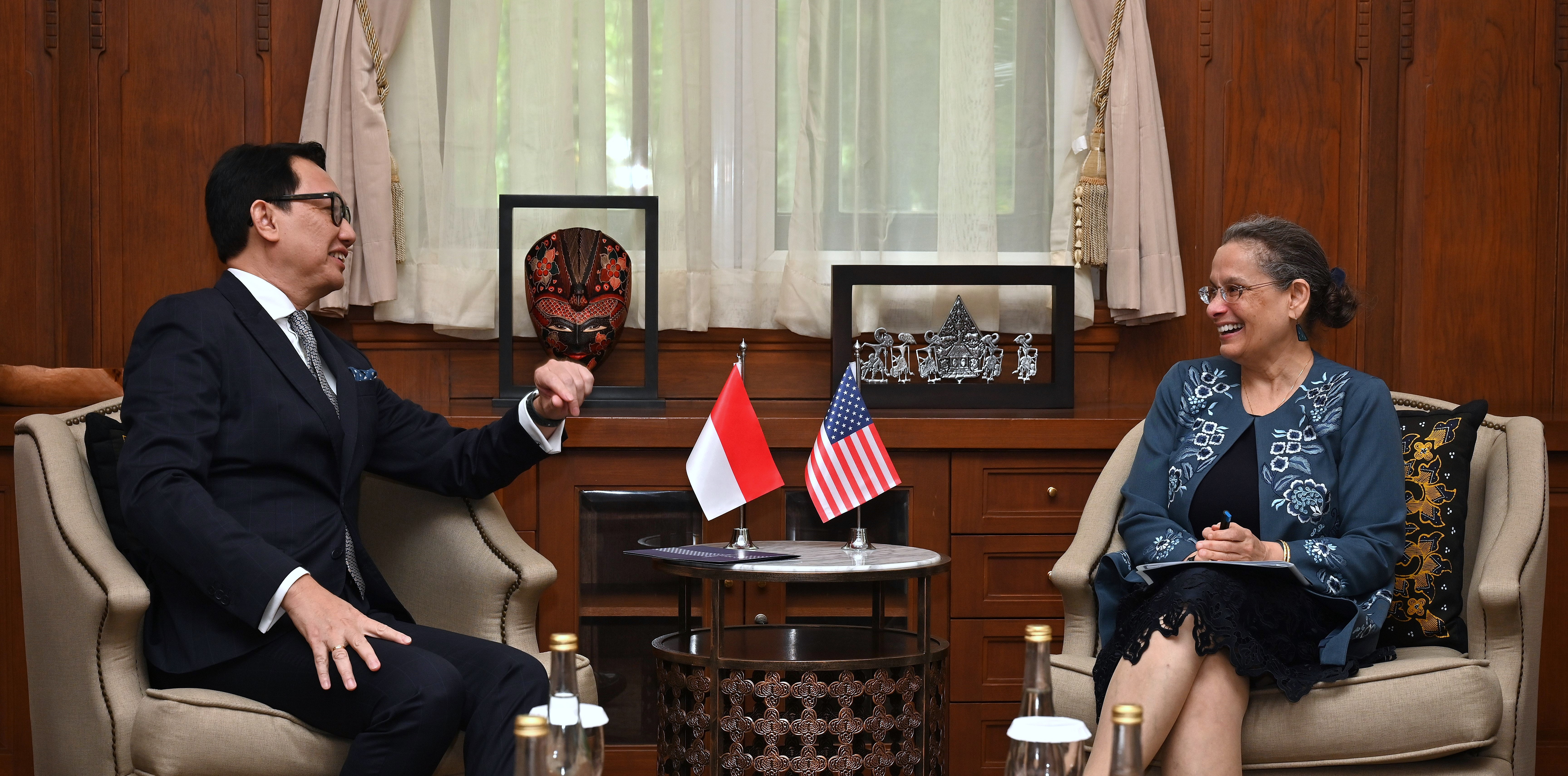
Arif with Lakhdir in January 2025.

Arif commented on the resignation of the U.S. ambassador to Indonesia Kamala Shirin Lakhdir in April 2025, stating that it was in her own volition as she felt uncomfortable with the current situation in Indonesia.

In June 2025, a group of Greenpeace activists interrupted Arif's speech at the Indonesia Minerals Conference and Expo. The activists, who held signs with the writing 'Nickel Mines Destroy Lives', 'save Raja Ampat' and 'Papua is not an empty land', rejected the presence of nickel mines in Raja Ampat. The activists were detained by the local police but was released after being questioned for about eight hours.

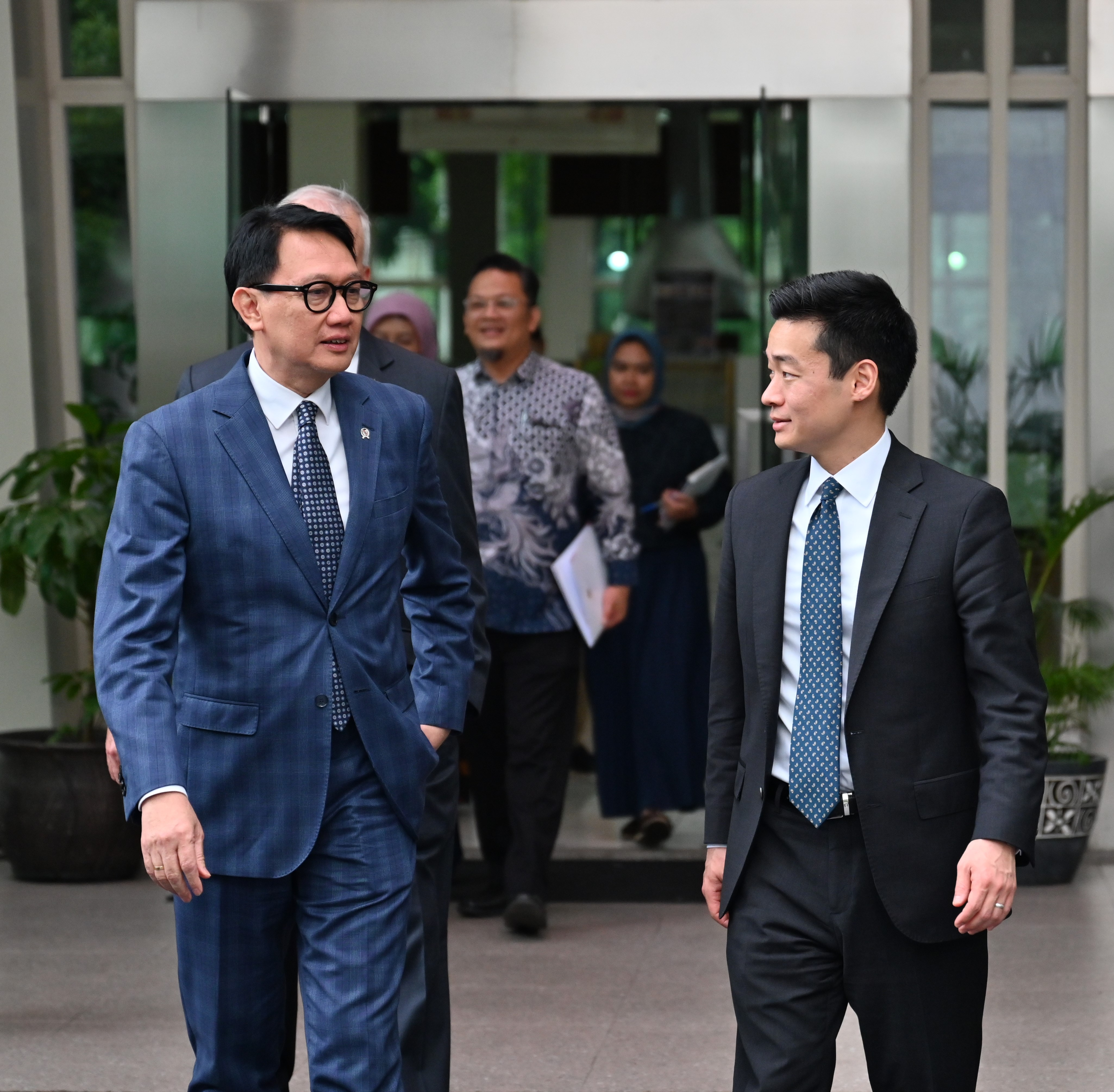
Arif with U.S. assistant secretary of defense John Noh in February 2026.

In July 2025, Arif was appointed as the commissioner of Pertamina International Shipping, a subsidiary company of the state owned oil company Pertamina. Just four months after his appointment, the constitutional court issued a ruling banning cabinet members to hold dual offices. When questioned about his role in the company, Arif stated that he would comply with the ruling and awaits further instructions from Danantara, the superholding agency for all state owned enterprises.
