= Tubagus Hasanuddin =

Indonesian politician and general

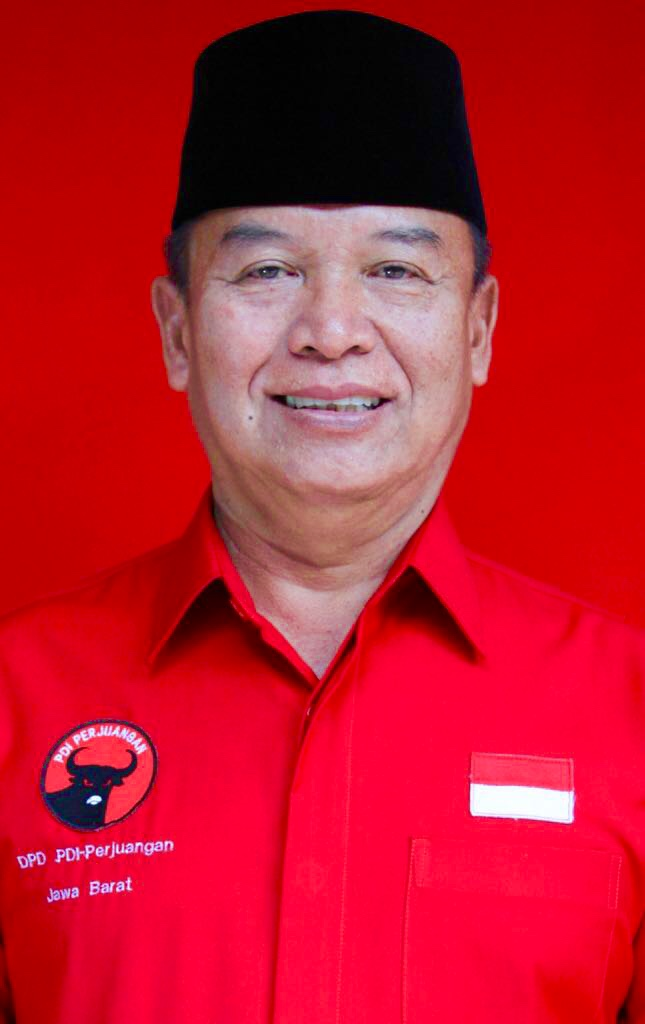

Member of People's Representative Council
- Incumbent
- Assumed office 1 October 2019
- Constituency: West Java 9
- In office 1 October 2009 – 2018

Personal details
- Born: 8 September 1952 (age 74) Majalengka, West Java, Indonesia
- Party: PDI-P
- Relations: Sanitiar Burhanuddin (brother)
- Education: Indonesian Military Academy

Military service
- Branch/service: Indonesian Army
- Years of service: 1975–2009
- Rank: Major General

Tubagus Hasanuddin or known as TB Hasanuddin (born 8 September 1952) is an Indonesian politician and former Indonesian military officer (Army general) who has served as a member of the People's Representative Council of the PDI-P Faction between 2009 and 2018, and from 2019 to present.

Originating from Majalengka, Tubagus served in the Indonesian Army for over thirty years, working as adjutant or military secretary for four presidents before his retirement and entry into politics in 2009. He ran as a gubernatorial candidate in West Java's 2018 gubernatorial election, but he placed last.

== Background ==
Tubagus was born in Majalengka, West Java, on 8 September 1952, as the fifth child of nine. His father Sutisna was a village chief. He completed elementary and junior high school in Majalengka, before moving to Magelang to complete his senior high school. Afterwards, he enrolled in the Indonesian Military Academy, following a suggestion from his brother-in-law. He graduated in 1974. He later studied at Pasundan University, gaining a bachelors, masters and doctorate.

He lives in Cilandak, South Jakarta, and is married with a single children.

== Career ==
=== Military ===
After graduating, Tubagus was assigned to Kodam III/Siliwangi. Between 1992 and 1993, he was assigned to Iraq as part of the Garuda Contingent. After some time at Kodam Jaya and Kostrad, he was appointed as adjutant to Vice President Try Sutrisno in 1996, before becoming an adjutant to President B.J. Habibie in 1998, a positioned he retained in the presidency of Abdurrahman Wahid. He was then appointed as the military secretary of the next president Megawati Sukarnoputri. After Susilo Bambang Yudhoyono became president, he was replaced in November 2004.

He then continued his service at TNI headquarters until he retired in 2009.

=== Politics ===
After retiring from the armed forces, he joined Indonesian Democratic Party of Struggle (PDI-P) and successfully ran for a seat in the People's Representative Council in the 2009 legislative election. Representing the West Java 9th electoral district (Majalengka, Subang and Sumedang), he was reelected following the 2014 legislative election after winning 76,991 votes. At PDI-P, he was also elected the chairman of the West Java branch in 2010 and 2015.

Within the parliament, Tubagus was the deputy chairman of its first commission. In 2016, Tubagus criticized President Joko Widodo's plan to grant amnesty to former GAM militant and armed group leader Din Minimi, stating that Din was a criminal prisoner instead of a political one and hence should not be granted amnesty.

Despite initially stating that he was not running, Tubagus ran as PDI-P's gubernatorial candidate in the 2018 gubernatorial election for West Java, and resigned from his parliamentary post to do so, but he placed last with 2,773,078 votes (12.62%). He ran again in the 2019 legislative election, still as a PDI-P candidate from West Java's 9th district. He was reelected to the body. He was reelected for a fourth term in the 2024 election with 79,525 votes.
