= Mangasi Sihombing =

Indonesian politician (born 1947)

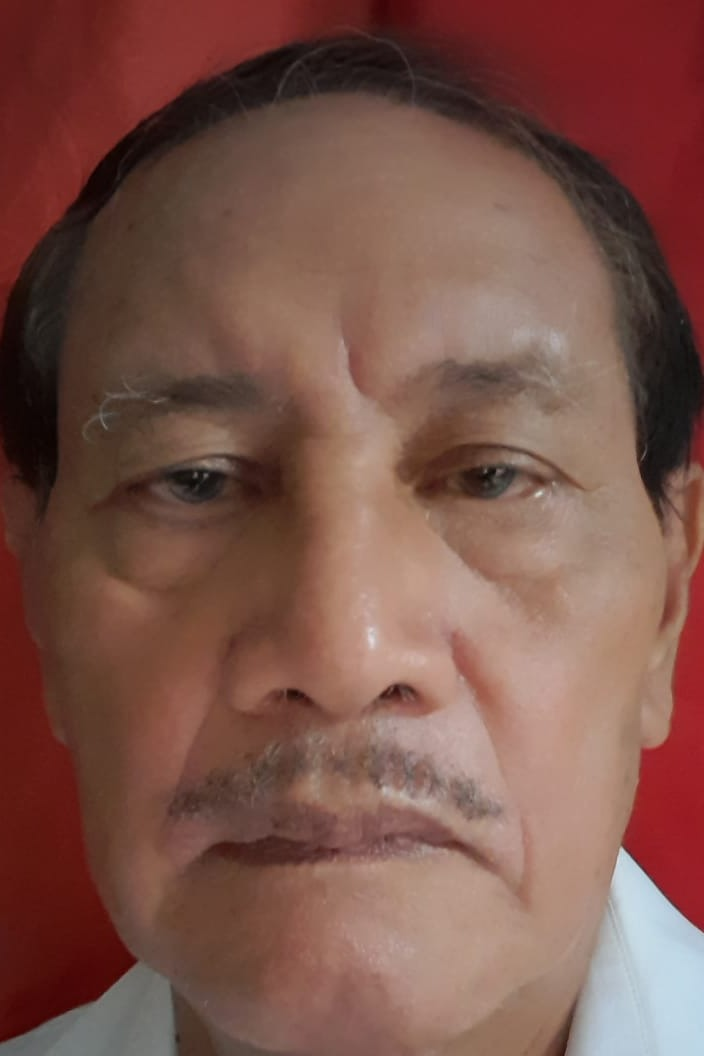
- Sihombing's portrait as a 2024 election candidate

Ambassador of Indonesia to Hungary
- In office 18 October 2006 – September 2010
- President: Susilo Bambang Yudhoyono
- Preceded by: Sapartini Singgih Kuntjoro Jakti
- Succeeded by: Maruli Tua Sagala

Director General of Information and Public Diplomacy
- In office 6 February 2006 – 2006
- Minister: Hassan Wirajuda
- Preceded by: Position created
- Succeeded by: Andri Hadi

Director General of Information, Public Diplomacy, and International Treaties
- In office 3 May 2002 – 6 February 2006
- Minister: Hassan Wirajuda
- Preceded by: Position created
- Succeeded by: Eddy Pratomo (International Law and Treaties) himself (Information and Public Diplomacy)

Personal details
- Born: July 22, 1947 (age 79) Lintong Nihuta, North Sumatra, Indonesia
- Party: Indonesian Solidarity Party (2018–2020); Peaceful Indonesia Party (2020–2023); Nusantara Awakening Party (2023–?)
- Spouse: Parodang boru Hasibuan
- Children: 1
- Education: Jakarta 17 August 1945 University (Drs.)

Mangasi Sihombing (born 22 July 1947) is an Indonesian diplomat who served as the ambassador to Hungary, Bosnia and Herzegovina, Croatia, and Macedonia from 2006 to 2010. Prior to his ambassadorship, Mangasi was the director general of information, public diplomacy, and international treaties from 2002 to 2006 and the deputy chief of mission of the embassy in Canberra from 2000 to 2002.

== Early life and education ==
Mangasi was born on 22 July 1947 in Lintong Nihuta, a small village in Humbang Hasundutan, North Sumatra. Mangasi was raised in a customary community where ancient traditions and "adat" customary laws remained influential. His family background was marked by a blend of these traditional customs and their conversion to Christianity; notably, his family maintained a rare piece of Herend porcelain for over a century, which served as a significant heirloom and a symbol of their heritage. The porcelain was initially buried with his great-grandfather, but his father recovered the porcelain with the approval from other family members shortly after his grandfather was reburied in 1959. He later chronicled the story in his autobiography titled From Indonesian Batak Ulos to Hungarian Porcelan and Tears of a Boy, published in 2008.

Mangasi attended the people's school (equivalent to elementary school) in Lintong Nihuta from 1954 to 1960 before continuing his education at a Catholic middle school from 1960 to 1963. His family then moved to Gunungsitoli, the capital of Nias, and he completed his high school at the only state high school operating in the city from 1963 to 1966. He began attending the Jakarta 17 August 1945 University in 1967 and received his bachelor's degree in political sciences in 1972 with a thesis titled Human Rights and the Responsibility of Citizens.

== Diplomatic career ==
Mangasi's diplomatic service began in January 1970. He worked as an ordinary staff for four years until he was promoted as the head of a subsection in 1974. Between 1976 and 1977 he undertook basic diplomatic course. His tour of duty abroad involved postings as chief of socio-cultural affairs in embassies in Copenhagen (1979–1983), Port Moresby (1986–1988), and Moscow (1988–1990). During his service in Port Moresby, Mangasi was part of Indonesia's delegate to a joint border committee meeting in 1987. Mangasi also held positions in the foreign ministry such as deputy director in the security affairs directorate from 1983 to 1986 and the chief of administration of the foreign information direcotrate from 1990 to 1992. During his stint in the latter, Mangasi took part in a bilateral meeting with Brunei Darussalam authorities regarding broadcasting and information cooperation in March 1991. He completed his mid-level and senior diplomatic course in 1983 and 1992, respectively.

From 1992 to 1997, Mangasi was the chief of political affairs at the embassy in The Hague. Mangasi was present as an observer in the preparation proceedings for the establishment of the Organisation for the Prohibition of Chemical Weapons and International Court of Justice during proceedings regarding the legality of nuclear weapons and participated in various seminars on universal human rights and cultural differences. He was also active in Christian organizations, where he chaired the Union of Indonesian Christians in Europe from 1993 to 1995 and the coordinating body for Indonesian Christians in the Netherlands in 1993.

Mangasi was named as the director of Europe from 1997 to 2000 before embarking on a two-year tenure as the deputy chief of mission, or the number two at Indonesia's embassy in Canberra. He received the Civil Servants' Long Service Medal, 2nd class, in 1997. In early 2001, Mangasi took up the duty as the embassy's chargé d'affaires ad interim following the departure of ambassador Arizal Effendi, who had just been appointed as the foreign department's secretary general. Mangasi's temporary leadership of the embassy ends following the arrival of the new ambassador, Sudjadnan Parnohadiningrat, sometime in May that year.

=== Director general ===
In light of organizational restructuring within the foreign ministry, both Mangasi and his superior, Sudjanan, were recalled to Jakarta to take up new posts. Mangasi was appointed to lead the directorate general of information, public diplomacy, and foreign treaties on 3 May 2002. The agency was a merger of the old directorate general of foreign information and socio-cultural relations and the directorate of international treaties. He exercised authority over five operational directorates: information and media, public diplomacy, diplomatic security, political, security and territorial treaties, and economic, social, and cultural treaties. In 2003, he received the Civil Servants' Long Service Medal, 1st class.

His leadership in this role involved heavy engagement in international diplomacy and legal consultations. He served as the chairman of the Joint Border Committee (JBC) between Indonesia and Papua New Guinea for several consecutive years and acted as the alternate head of delegation for the Asia-African Legal Consultative Organization (AALCO) at sessions held in Abuja, Seoul, Nairobi, and Kenya. Additionally, he led the Indonesian delegation in negotiations with Malaysia regarding the placement of Indonesian migrant workers and represented the government as an observer at the Conference on Interaction and Confidence Building Measures in Asia (CICBMA) in Kazakhstan. His diplomatic efforts also included high-level participation in the signing of the UN Convention Against Corruption in Mexico and interfaith dialogues at the Vatican.

A second reorganization, which occurred in December 2005, removed the responsibility of international treaties from Mangasi. Eddy Pratomo, who was Eddy's former subordinate, was appointed to lead the new directorate general of international law and treaties. Mangasi had previously recommended Eddy to immediately become an ambassador after serving under him, but was halted due to a lack of vacant ambassadorial post.

=== Ambassador ===
Mangasi became Indonesia's ambassador to Hungary, with concurrent accreditation to Bosnia and Herzegovina, Croatia, and Macedonia on 18 October 2006. He presented his credentials to president László Sólyom of Hungary on 2 February 2007, president Stjepan Mesić of Croatia on 9 February 2007, chairman of presidency Nebojša Radmanović on 26 February 2007, and president Branko Crvenkovski of Macedonia on 13 March 2007. Mangasi's ambassadorial tenure ended in September 2010.

As ambassador, Mangasi worked to promote Indonesia through cultural diplomacy, with him personally contributing to the publication of Indonesian translations of works by Janus Pannonius and a collection of one hundred Hungarian poems. He was recognized for having translated 33 poems by Bálint Balassi to Indonesian, which was published in 2013. He also supported the staging of Hungarian dramas by authors such as Madách and Örkény in Indonesia. Through these initiatives, he aimed to increase international interest in Indonesian culture, specifically focusing on the promotion of the Indonesian language, traditional dances, and batik. Within the other accredited countries, Mangasi managed to secure a mutual agreement on visa exemption for diplomatic and service passport holders in Macedonia in 2007 and a mutual support commitment from the Croatian government in various international forums in 2008.

He also put himself as a representation of an Evangelical Christian in order to emphasize Indonesia's inclusive and tolerant nature despite its status as the world's most populous Islamic country. He received an array of accolades from Christian entities, including the Transdanubian Diocese Medal from the Bishop of the Lutheran Church of Hungary in 2009 and Prónay Sándor Medal from the Hungarian Lutheran Church in 2010. Mangasi also received awards from municipal governments, including Medal of the City of Gödöllő and the Key to the City of Sarkad in 2010, a general's sword from the Sopronkőhida prison, and a ceremonial designation as a friend of the Zánka Cultural and Youth Centre.

== Later life ==
In 2018, Mangasi entered the Indonesian Solidarity Party and was nominated for the House of Representative from the Jakarta II electoral district in the 2019 Indonesian general election. Mangasi was introduced by the party to the public on 21 August 2018. He established Solidarity of the Children of the Indonesian Nation (Saba, Solidaritas Anak Bangsa Indonesia) as his support base and promised to hold raffle for a chance for the volunteers to receive scholarships and Umrah pilgrimage tickets if he was to be elected as a parliament member. Mangasi was not elected as the party did not pass the threshold for the number of votes required for a nationwide seat. He then announced his withdrawal from the party on 8 June 2020 and on 28 October 2020 established the Peaceful Indonesia Party alongside other prominent Christian figures. He joined the Nusantara Awakening Party and ran as a candidate for the Jakarta Regional House of Representatives in the 2024 election, but was unsuccessful.

Outside politics, Mangasi is active in literary circles. He is the chief advisor of the Indonesian Literary Translation Foundation and an advisor for the Association of Indonesian Literature Writers Association from 2015 to 2018.

== Personal life ==
Mangasi is married to Parodang boru Hasibuan and has a child. He is a Christian and attends the Indonesian Christian Church Synod in Kwitang.
