= 2018 West Java gubernatorial election =

West Java gubernatorial election

- 27 June 2018
- Turnout: 70.3%
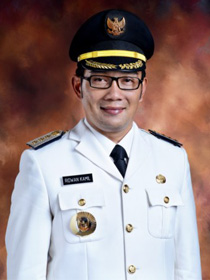

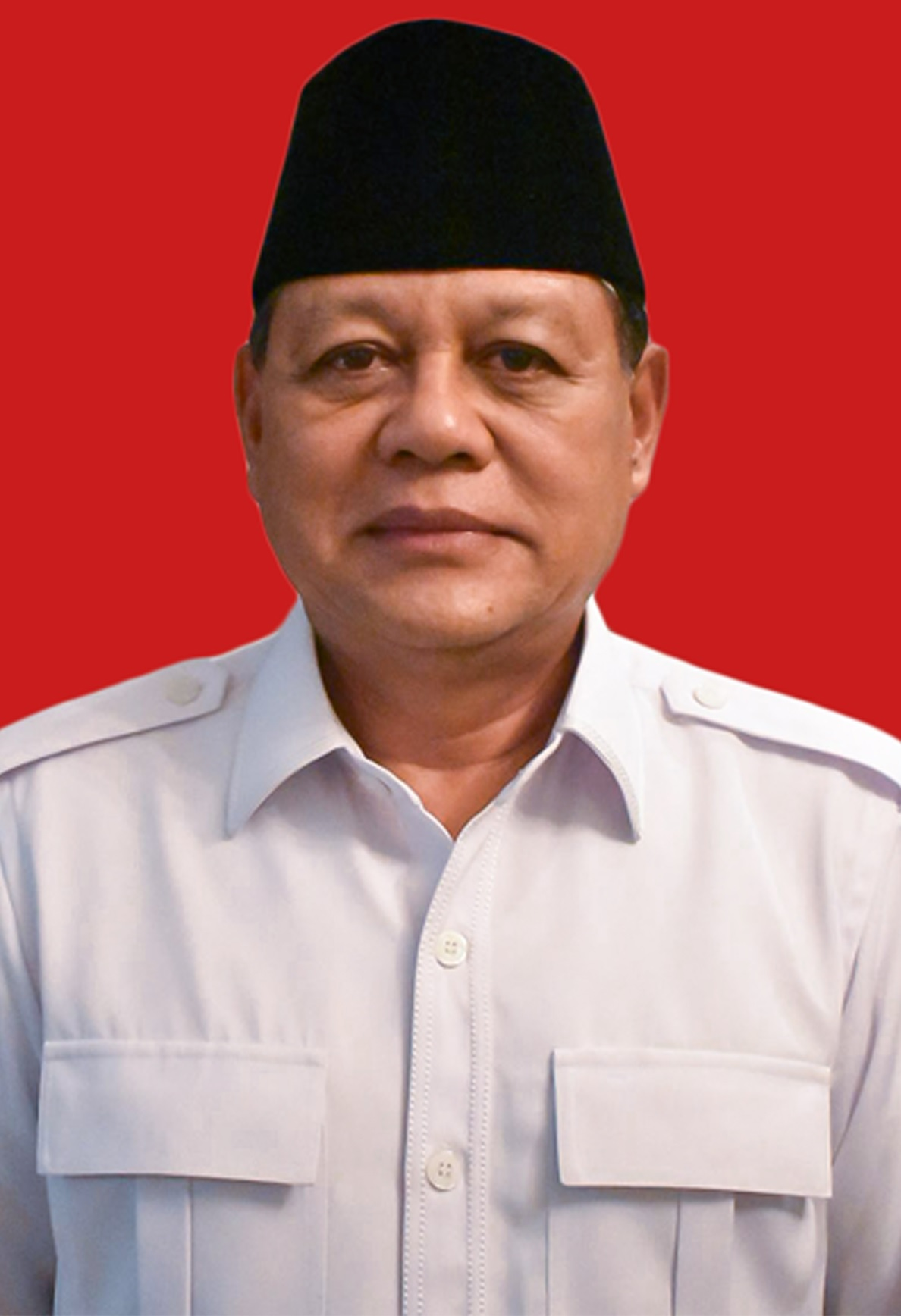

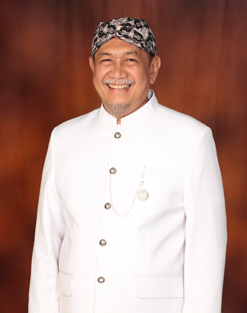

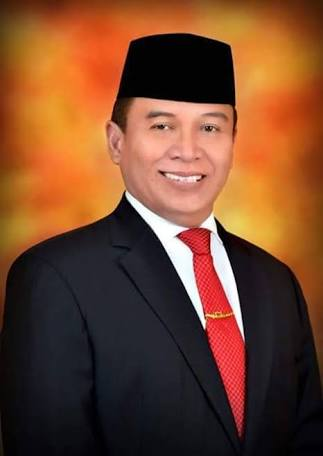
Nominee	Ridwan Kamil	Sudrajat
Party	Independent	Gerindra
Running mate	Uu Ruzhanul Ulum	Ahmad Syaikhu
Popular vote	7,226,254	6,317,465
Percentage	32.88%	28.74%
Nominee	Deddy Mizwar	Tubagus Hasanuddin
Party	Demokrat	PDI-P
Running mate	Dedi Mulyadi	Anton Charliyan
Popular vote	5,663,198	2,773,078
Percentage	25.77%	12.62%
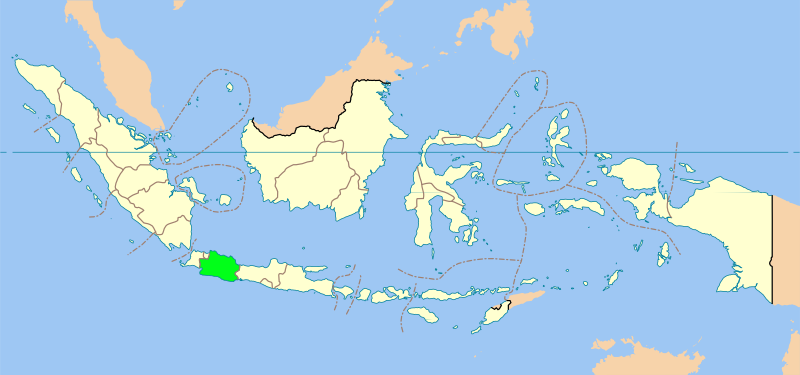
- Location of West Java within Indonesia
Governor before election
Ahmad Heryawan
PKS
Elected Governor
Ridwan Kamil
Independent

The 2018 West Java gubernatorial election took place on 27 June 2018 as part of the simultaneous local elections. It was held to elect the governor of West Java along with their deputy, whilst members of the provincial council (Dewan Perwakilan Rakyat Daerah) will be re-elected in 2019.

Incumbent Ahmad Heryawan was barred from participating in the re-elections after having served two full terms. Candidates included the sitting vice governor Deddy Mizwar, mayor of Bandung Ridwan Kamil, People's Representative Council member Tubagus Hasanuddin and retired major general Sudrajat.

== Timeline ==
On 10 September 2017, the KPU declared that there will be 32,809,057 eligible voters in the province, down about 200 thousand from in 2013.

Registration for party-backed candidates were opened between 8 and 10 January 2018, while independent candidates were required to register between 22 and 26 November 2017. The numerical order of the candidates were determined on 13 February through a lottery. The campaigning period would commence between 15 February and 24 June, with a three-day election silence before voting on 27 June.

== Candidates ==
Under regulations, candidates are required to secure the support of a political party or a coalition thereof comprising at least 20 seats in the regional house. Alternatively, independent candidates may run provided they are capable of securing support from 6.5 percent of the total voter population (2,132,470) in form of photocopied ID cards subject to verification by the local committee although no candidates expressing interest managed to do this.

#	Candidate	Position	Running mate	Parties
1	Ridwan Kamil	Mayor of Bandung	Uu Ruzhanul Ulum	PPP (9 seats); PKB (7 seats); NasDem (5 seats); Hanura (3 seats) Total 24 seats
2	Tubagus Hasanuddin	Member of People's Representative Council	Anton Charliyan	PDI-P (20 seats)
3	Sudrajat	Retired major general in the TNI	Ahmad Syaikhu	PKS (12 seats); Gerindra (11 seats); PAN (4 seats) Total 27 seats
4	Deddy Mizwar	Vice Governor of West Java	Dedi Mulyadi	Golkar (17 seats); Demokrat (12 seats) Total 29 seats

== Polling ==
=== After formal nominations ===
Pollster	Date	Sample size	Ridwan Kamil	Deddy Mizwar	Sudrajat	TB Hasanuddin
Poltracking	18–22 June 2018	800	42.0	35.8	10.7	5.5
Instrat	18–21 June 2018	1,200	33.92	38.17	8.50	8.67
LSI	7–14 June 2018	440	38.0	36.6	8.2	7.7
Indo Barometer	7–13 June 2018	1,200	36.9	30.1	6.1	5.0
SMRC	22 May-1 June 2018	820	43.1	34.1	7.9	6.5
Litbang Kompas	10–15 May 2018	800	40.4	39.1	11.7	4.1
Instrat	3–6 May 2018	1,800	29	40.5	7.7	4.7
LSI	21–29 March 2018	440	39.3	43.2	8.2	4.1
Indo Barometer	20–26 March 2018	1,200	36.7	31.3	5.4	3.4
LKPI	26 February-11 March 2018	2,178	17.4	22.3	18.2	6.2
SMRC	1–8 March 2018	801	43.7	30.7	4.6	2.8
Litbang Kompas	19 February-4 March 2018	800	39.9	42.8	7.8	3.1
Indo Barometer	20–23 January 2018	800	44.8	27.9	0.9	1.0
Cyrus Network	16–22 January 2018	1,000	45.9	40.9	5.0	2.5

=== Before nominations ===
Pollster	Date	Sample size	Results
eLSID	30 November - 8 December 2017	630	RK (28.5%), DeMiz (20.6%), DeMul (12.3%)
Poltracking	10–15 November 2017	1,200	RK (24.2%), DeMiz (7.1%), DeMul (4.2%)
Puskopi	15–27 October 2017	1,897	DeMiz (24.3%), DY (10.3%), DeMul (8.7%), Iwa Karniwa (6.1%), RK (5.7%)
Indo Barometer	11–15 October 2017	800	RK (41.6%), DeMul (18.9%), DeMiz (14.2%)
Indocon	10–22 October 2017	971	RK (34.6%), DeMul (15.3%), DeMiz (11.9%)
SMRC	27 September - 3 October 2017	820	RK (34.1%), DeMiz (15.5%), DY (9.9%), Abdullah Gymnastiar (6.0%), DeMul (5.6%), Agus Harimurti Yudhoyono (3.4%)
Lingkaran Survei Indonesia	22–29 September 2017	440	RK (34.2%), DY (28.3%), DeMiz (21.6%), DeMul (13.7%)
Indo Barometer	17–23 May 2017	800	RK (28.6%), DeMiz (18.8%), DeMul (11.5%), DY (6.3%)
Indo Barometer	27 February-3 March 2017	800	Ridwan Kamil (26.6%), Deddy Mizwar (19.3%), Dede Yusuf (14.4%), Dedi Mulyadi (7.9%)

== Results ==
Results by city and regency

=== Quick count ===
Pollster	Ridwan Kamil	TB Hasanuddin	Sudrajat	Deddy Mizwar
Litbang Kompas	32.54	12.20	29.53	25.72
SMRC	32.26	12.77	29.58	25.38

=== Official ===
2018 West Java gubernatorial election results
Candidate	Vote	
Candidate	Count	%
Ridwan Kamil	7,226,254	32.88%
Sudrajat	6,317,465	28.74%
Deddy Mizwar	5,663,198	25.77%
Tubagus Hasanuddin	2,773,078	12.62%
Valid votes	21,979,995	96.72%
Invalid votes	744,338	3.28%
Total votes	22,724,333	100.00%
Registered electors	32,325,315	
Sources: Election Commission of West Java
