= Syam Soemanagara =

Indonesian diplomat and military officer

Ambassador of Indonesia to Lebanon
- In office 13 June 2000 – 2002
- President: Abdurrahman Wahid; Megawati Sukarnoputri
- Preceded by: Dalindra Aman
- Succeeded by: Abdullah Syarwani

Inspector General of the Foreign Department
- In office 25 January 1994 – 26 February 1998
- Minister: Ali Alatas
- Preceded by: Hartono Martodiredjo
- Succeeded by: Aa Kustia

Personal details
- Born: between 1938 and 1939 Bogor, West Java

Military service
- Branch/service: Indonesian Army
- Years of service: 1961–1998
- Rank: Major general
- Unit: Infantry
- Commands: 18th Infantry Brigade
- Battles/wars: Darul Islam rebellion

Syam Soemanagara (born 1938 or 1939) is an Indonesian military officer and diplomat who served as the inspector general of the foreign department from 1994 to 1998 and ambassador to Lebanon from 2000 to 2002. A 1961 graduate of the Indonesian Military Academy, Syam had served in various position within the military, including as commander of the 18th infantry brigade, defence attaché in London, and chief of the defence department's language center.

== Biography ==
Syam was born in Bogor between 1938 and 1939. He graduated from the Indonesian Military Academy in 1961 and commissioned as a second lieutenant of the infantry corps. Syam and two of his friends were then assigned to the West Sumatra (17 August) Regional Military Command, where they reported to the military command's personnel assistant for their specific duties. At the time of their arrival, West Sumatra was still recovering from the remnants of the conflict between the national army and the Revolutionary Government of the Republic of Indonesia. Syam was later stationed at the first company of the 131st infantry battalion in Payakumbuh, where he commanded the company's second platoon. As a junior officer, Syam ofted received invitation and deliveries from local clerics. He took part in an airborne course held by the regional military command and in 1964 attempted to join the army's special forces, but withdrew due to its harsh training. On the same year, Syam along with several of his classmates were sent to fought against the Darul Islam rebellion group in South Sulawesi.

He reached the rank of colonel sometime in the late 1970s and was assigned to teach at the Indonesian Army Command and General Staff College. In September 1980, he left his teaching position to assume command of the 18th infantry brigade in Kediri. He was later appointed as the chief of staff of the Bandung garrison before being sent to East Timor in 1984 as the chief of staff of the security operations command in the Province. Syam was then sent to London for his maiden diplomatic assignment as defence attaché at Indonesia's embassy.

Upon his return to Jakarta, Syam was promoted to the rank of brigadier general, and served as the chief of the department of defence and security's language center from 1 September 1991 to 28 July 1993. He was further promoted to the rank of major general with his appointment as the senior advisor to the commander of the armed forces for people's welfare. He resigned from the post on 25 January 1994 and was subsequently sworn in as the foreign department's inspector general four days later, replacing Hartono Martodiredjo who became ambassador to Germany. Syam's term as inspector general ended on 26 February 1998. During his handover ceremony to rear admiral Aa Kustia, foreign minister Ali Alatas praised him for his role in improving the foreign department's supervision methods.

Two years later, on 13 June 2000 Syam became Indonesia's ambassador to Lebanon. Syam served until 2002. Syam was one of the signatory of the Petition 100, a petition made in 2023 which demanded demanded the impeachment of president Joko Widodo.
