= Abdullah Fuad Rachman =

Indonesian diplomat (born 1932)

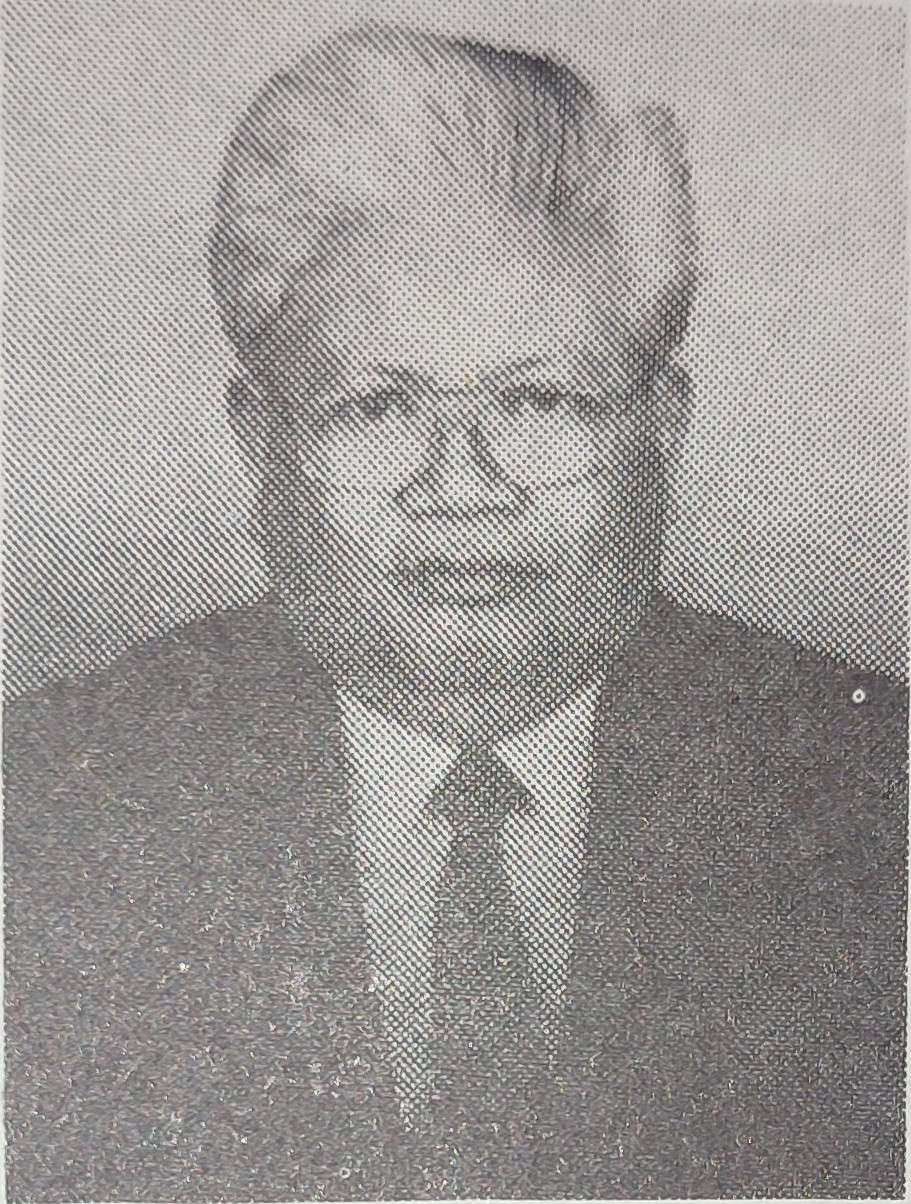

Ambassador of Indonesia to the United Arab Emirates
- In office 1 February 1993 – 31 August 1996
- President: Suharto
- Preceded by: office established
- Succeeded by: Husny Sungkar

Personal details
- Born: August 8, 1932 (age 94) Ciamis, West Java, Dutch East Indies
- Education: Foreign Service Academy (Drs.)

Abdullah Fuad Rachman (born 8 August 1932) is an Indonesian career diplomat who served as Indonesia's inaugural ambassador to the United Arab Emirates from 1993 to 1996.

== Early life, personal life, and education ==
Abdullah Fuad Rachman was born on 8 August 1932 in Ciamis, West Java. He graduated Foreign Service Academy in 1957.

He is a Muslim. He is married and has six children.

== Diplomatic career ==
Abdullah officially entered the foreign department in 1957. His first overseas assignment came in 1963, when he was stationed at the embassy in Cairo, initially serving with the rank of attaché before being promoted to third secretary in 1964. He returned to Jakarta in 1966 to serve within the directorate of Africa and Middle East. His diplomatic duties took him abroad again in 1972, when he was appointed first secretary at the embassy in Damascus, where he was subsequently promoted to counsellor in 1975.

Later that same year, Abdullah returned to Jakarta for another assignment within the directorate of Africa and Middle East Affairs. He completed senior diplomatic education in 1978 and was appointed as minister counsellor at the embassy in Warsaw in 1979. He returned to Jakarta in 1983 to once again serve in the directorate of Africa and Middle East. His responsibilities grew significantly in 1985 when he was appointed charge d'affaires ad interim at the embassy in Kabul, Afghanistan, with the diplomatic rank of minister counsellor.

After returning to Jakarta and promoted to minister in 1988, Abdullah was named director of data collecting and processing within the directorate general of socio-cultural relations and foreign information in 1989. On 1 February 1993, Abdullah was installed as ambassador to the United Arab Emirates, taking up residence in Abu Dhabi. He presented his credentials to President of the United Arab Emirates Zayed bin Sultan Al Nahyan on 6 April 1993 and served until 31 August 1996.
