= Aa Kustia =

Indonesian diplomat (1944–2022)

Ambassador of Indonesia to China
- In office 23 April 2001 – 31 July 2005
- President: Megawati Sukarnoputri; Susilo Bambang Yudhoyono
- Preceded by: Kuntara
- Succeeded by: Sudrajat

Inspector General of the Foreign Department
- In office 26 February 1998 – 17 July 2000
- Minister: Ali Alatas; Alwi Shihab
- Preceded by: Syam Soemanagara
- Succeeded by: Santoso Rahardjo

Personal details
- Born: May 28, 1944 Bandung, West Java
- Died: March 21, 2022 (aged 77) Jakarta, Indonesia

Military service
- Branch/service: Indonesian Navy
- Years of service: 1967–2000
- Rank: Rear admiral
- Unit: Electronic Corps

Aa Kustia Sukarnaprawira (28 May 1944 – 21 March 2022) was an Indonesian naval officer and diplomat who served as ambassador to China from 2001 to 2005. Aa had served in diplomatic postings as naval attaché at the embassy in Kuala Lumpur from 1985 to 1988 and inspector general of the foreign department from 1998 to 2000 before his ambassadorial appointment.

== Early life and education ==
Aa was born on 28 May 1944 in Bandung and graduated from the Indonesian Naval Academy in 1967. Aa has a degree in economics and has completed his education at the Naval Intelligence School, Defense and Security Intelligence Course, advanced officer training, the Indonesian Naval Command and Staff College, and a regular course at the National Resilience Institute in 1991. He also received vocational intelligence training in Woodside, Australia, in 1973.

== Career ==
His military career began with his commission as a second lieutenant in the electronics corps, where his initial sea duty was served as an electronics officer aboard the frigate KRI Slamet Riyadi. Kustia's trajectory saw him move through several strategic postings throughout Indonesia, including assignments with the fleet in Surabaya and the naval regional command in Ujung Pandang. In 1985, Kustia, with the rank of naval colonel, was stationed as naval attaché (his official title was the assistant to the defense attaché for naval affairs) at the embassy in Kuala Lumpur. He served for three years until he was replaced by Akip Masri on 24 August 1988.

From the armed forces, Aa was assigned to the armed forces intelligence agency, where he held various postings related to foreign affairs and relations. He was promoted to first admiral with his appointment as the director B of the agency, which entailed responsibilities on foreign-related matters. He accompanied the armed forces chief of the general staff in inspecting the construction of new Indonesian navy ships in Sydney in 1993. Afterwards, he moved to the armed forces headquarters and was promoted as advisor for people's welfare to the armed forces commander on 20 April 1994. He was accordingly promoted to the rank of rear admiral on 9 May 1994.

Following his advisory role in the armed forces headquarters, on 26 January 1996 the armed forces spokesperson announced Kustia's reassignment into the naval headquarters as the coordinator of advisors to the navy chief of staff. In his capacity, Kustia advocated for the formation of a naval task force for the development of coastal village and a comprehensive cataloguing of Indonesia's islands.

Kustia transitioned into the civilian service with his appointment as the inspector general of the foreign department on 26 February 1998, serving until 17 July 2000. A few months later, on 25 January 2001 Kustia was assessed by the House of Representative's first commission following his nomination as ambassador by president Abdurrahman Wahid. He was sworn in on 23 April 2001 and arrived in China on 7 June. He presented his credentials to president Jiang Zemin on 4 July 2001. On 26 of the same month, he met with China's premier Zhu Rongji. During his tenure, Aa oversaw the signing of new business deals, establishment of new financial institutions, and a widening market between the two countries.

In December 2008, Kustia was investigated for his role for collecting unauthorized cable fees for visa applicants and travel documents. The embezzled funds totaled to an estimated 10 million yuans, or equivalent to $9 million. Kustia was named as a suspect and a second investigation on the matter was conducted in January 2009. However, he was freed from the indictment after he returned the embezzled funds.

Kustia died on 21 March 2022 in Jakarta. His body was interred at the Al-Azhar Memorial Garden.
