= Djawoto =

Indonesian journalist and diplomat

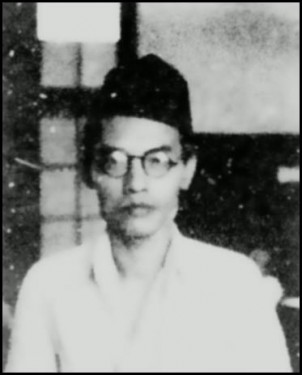

4th Indonesian Ambassador to the People's Republic of China
- In office March 1964 – 16 April 1966
- Preceded by: Sukarni
- Succeeded by: Abdurrahman Gunadirdja (1990)

Personal details
- Born: 10 August 1906 Tuban, Dutch East Indies
- Died: 24 December 1992 (aged 86) Amsterdam, Netherlands
- Occupation: Journalist

Djawoto (Perfected Spelling: Jawoto; August 10, 1906 – September 24, 1992) was an Indonesian journalist and diplomat. He served as Indonesia's ambassador to China and Mongolia starting in 1964.

== Teacher and journalist ==
Djawoto became part of the Indonesian nationalist movement through the Sarekat Islam, one of the first mass organizations of native Indonesians which was at its height in the 1910s and early 1920s. He started working as a teacher in 1927. A friend of Sukarno, Djawoto joined the Indonesian Nationalist Party in 1927. After 15 years as a teacher, Djawoto changed career and became a journalist instead. He worked at the Antara news agency for a number of years and served as its chief editor from 1946 to 1964. In 1945 he was included in the Education Section of the Socialist Party at the founding congress of the party. He was a member of the Central Indonesian National Committee between 1945 and 1949. His book Djurnalistik dalam praktek ('Journalism in Practice') was published in 1960. Djawoto was a leading figure in the Union of Indonesian Journalists (PWI).

== Ambassador ==
In 1964 he was named ambassador to China and Mongolia by President Sukarno. He was one of six journalists that Sukarno appointed as ambassadors during the 1960s.

== Life in exile ==
After the 30 September Movement coup attempt, rumored to have been sponsored by the Communist Party of Indonesia, and the resulting purge of persons considered communists which killed hundreds of thousands, the political situation in Indonesia became unstable. The once civil government became a military regime, and the country's political allegiances, previously supporting the East Bloc, became more friendly to the West. As a result, several hundred or thousand Indonesian leftists travelling abroad were unable to return to their homeland.

Djawoto, the ambassador to a communist country, remained in China and resigned his post, despite being recalled by the Indonesian Ministry of Foreign Affairs. In the early morning of April 16, 1966, Djawoto held a press conference at which he declared that he was no longer the Indonesian ambassador. In April 1966 Djawoto was granted political asylum in China. The Indonesian government withdrew his passport. He became general secretary of the Beijing-based Afro-Asian Journalists Association.

Djawoto left China and emigrated to the Netherlands in 1981. Although he had not been a Communist Party member, Djawoto was not allowed to return to Indonesia.
