= Sudrajat =

Indonesian politician, former general and diplomat

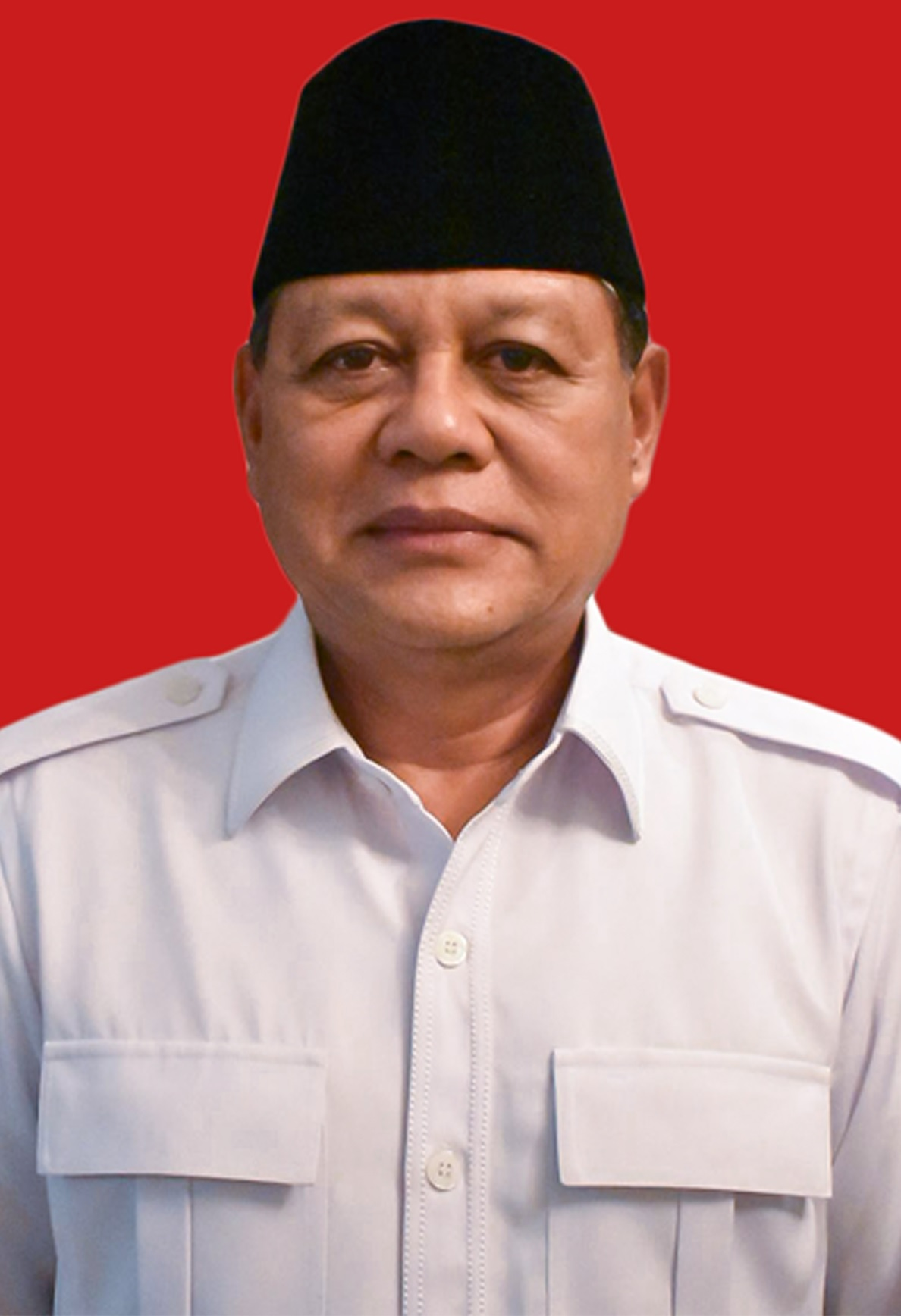

Ambassador of Indonesia to China
- In office 11 November 2005 – 27 November 2009
- Preceded by: Aa Kustia
- Succeeded by: Imron Cotan

Personal details
- Born: 4 February 1949 (age 77) Balikpapan, Indonesia
- Education: Indonesian Military Academy; Harvard University (MPA)

Military service
- Allegiance: Indonesia
- Branch/service: Indonesian Army
- Years of service: 1971–2004
- Rank: Major General

Sudrajat (mononymic; born 4 February 1949) is an Indonesian politician, former general and diplomat. He held the rank of Major General in the Indonesian Army, and was the Ambassador of Indonesia to China between 2005 and 2009. Currently, he is the CEO of Susi Air.

Born in Balikpapan, Sudrajat began his military career in 1971, upon graduation from the Indonesian Military Academy. He served in various positions, before retiring as a MG in 2004 and becoming an ambassador. Afterwards, he became the CEO of Susi Air replacing Susi Pudjiastuti. In 2018, he ran in West Java's gubernatorial election, but lost to Ridwan Kamil.

== Background and family ==
Sudrajat was born in Balikpapan on 4 February 1949, moving to Bandung at the age of 6. After completing his first 12 years of education in Bandung, he would join the Indonesian Military Academy in 1967, after he graduated from a trade school. Later on in his career, he would study at Harvard University, taking a Masters in Public Administration course.

Sudrajat is of Sundanese descent, with his father originating from Sumedang and his mother from Cianjur. He is married to Sally Salziah, and has two children.

== Career ==
=== Military ===
After graduating from the Indonesian Military Academy in 1971, he became a second lieutenant at the communications battalion of Kostrad. He then served as a technical officer at the Indonesian contingent for the United Nations Emergency Force in Egypt, before becoming the communications company commander of a Kostrad infantry brigade. He was then assigned to the Washington, D.C. Embassy as an aide to the defense attache, before becoming a secretary to the Panglima in 1983 and a general planning staff at TNI headquarters. After further diplomatic placements, he was promoted to brigadier general in 1997, became the deputy head of public affairs in 1998, and eventually head of public affairs in 1999 along with a promotion to major general.

During the presidency of Abdurrahman Wahid, Sudrajat openly disputed with Wahid on the interpretation of the Indonesian Constitution about the president having authority over all military branches, with Sudrajat stating that the Constitution does not imply the President of Indonesia being the highest commander of the Indonesian National Armed Forces. He was then removed from his post as head of the military's public affairs department. He also opposed to a military district reorganization proposal in 1999, going against then-Panglima Widodo Adi Sutjipto.

Following his removal from public affairs, he became a special staff to the Panglima on economics. Eventually, he became the director-general of defense strategy at the Ministry of Defense in 2003. He retired on 11 November 2004, holding the rank of Major General while still working at the ministry.

Contemporary major general Agus Wirahadikusumah was quoted as saying that "[Sudrajat] did not understand signals of professionality in the army."

=== Diplomatic ===
During his time in the military, he was assigned to the Indonesian Embassy in the United Kingdom as a defense attache in 1994. In 1997, he would also be assigned to the same post in the Washington, D.C. Embassy.

On 11 November 2005, Sudrajat was appointed by President Susilo Bambang Yudhoyono as the Ambassador of Indonesia to the People's Republic of China and Mongolia. He was attacked by some legislators from the People's Representative Council in 2006, when he was not present during the legislators' visit. While he was ambassador, he aided the investigation into a corruption case by his predecessor, which eventually led to a conviction. His tenure as ambassador ended on 27 November 2009.

Following his time as ambassador, he would serve as the chairman of the Indonesia-China Economic, Social and Cultural Cooperation Foundation.

=== Susi Air ===
Susi Pudjiastuti, the founder and CEO of Susi Air, was appointed as Minister of Maritime Affairs and Fisheries by Joko Widodo in 2014. She then decided to resign as CEO, and appointed Sudrajat to replace her. Before this appointment, Sudrajat had been the president commissioner of the company since 2004, with the company initially starting from Sudrajat's house in Kebayoran Baru.

=== Politics ===
In 2011, he was one of the founders of Nasdem in West Java, when it was still a mass organization. Not long after, however, he resigned when Nasdem registered to become a political party, citing that one of Nasdem's initial vision was to become a mass organization and not a political party. His departure was followed by a mass resignation of the central committee of Nasdem in the province.

Sudrajat ran for governorship of West Java in the 2018 gubernatorial election with the backing of three parties - Gerindra, PKS and PAN - and Bekasi Vice Mayor Ahmad Syaikhu as his running mate. During the campaigning period, he openly declared that his victory would mean a presidential change in the 2019 presidential election, and endorsed the #2019GantiPresiden movement. While forecast to win just around 8% of the votes in surveys preceding the election, Sudrajat ended up winning 28.74% of the votes (6,317,465), placing second behind Bandung mayor Ridwan Kamil (with Gerindra claiming that their internal survey placed Sudrajat in the first place). Close to Kamil's swearing in, his campaign team demanded the ceremony be cancelled due to administrative errors conducted.

He was part of Prabowo Subianto's 2014 presidential campaign team, as one of its spokespersons. He retained that position in the 2019 campaign team.

== Awards ==
=== National ===
Bintang Yudha Dharma Pratama

Bintang Kartika Eka Paksi Pratama

Santi Dharma (Garuda VIII)

=== Foreign awards ===
UNEF II

Legion of Merit
