= Abdurrahman Gunadirdja =

Indonesian diplomat (1926–2017)

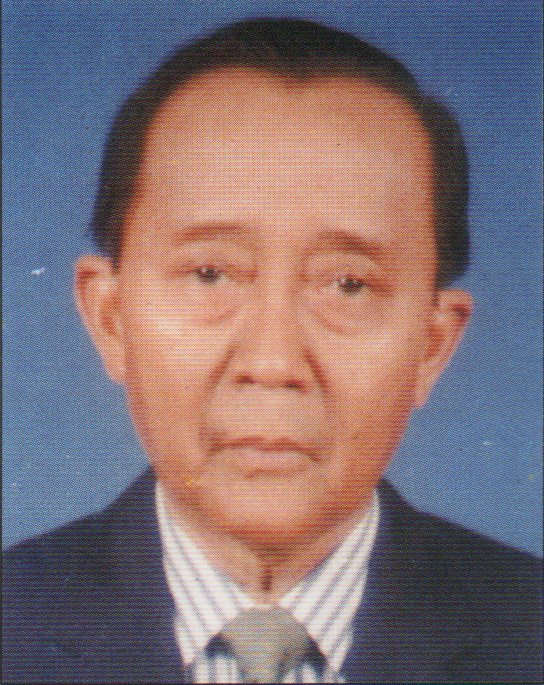

Ambassador of Indonesia to China
- In office 24 October 1990 – December 1993
- President: Suharto
- Preceded by: Djawoto (1966)
- Succeeded by: Juwana

Ambassador of Indonesia to Iraq
- In office 20 November 1982 – April 1986
- President: Suharto
- Preceded by: Sagiri Kartanegara
- Succeeded by: Abdullah Alwi Murtadho

Ambassador of Indonesia to Afghanistan
- In office 14 December 1977 – 1980
- President: Suharto
- Preceded by: Abdul Habir
- Succeeded by: Havid Abdulgani (1993)

Personal details
- Born: 26 April 1926 Tangerang, Dutch East Indies
- Died: 20 November 2017 (aged 91) Jakarta, Indonesia
- Spouse: Mastura (m. 1958)
- Children: 3
- Education: Sinology Academy; University of Indonesia (Drs.); Far Eastern University (MA)

Abdurrahman Gunadirdja (26 April 1926 – 20 November 2017) was an Indonesian diplomat who served as ambassador to three countries; he was the ambassador to Afghanistan from 1977 to 1980, to Iraq from 1982 to 1986, and to China from 1990 to 1994. He played a major role in the re-establishment of diplomatic relations with China in 1990 after it was severed for more than three decades.

== Early life and education ==
Abdurrahman was born on 26 April 1926 in Tangerang. He studied at the Sinology Academy, an education institute established by Sutan Mohammad Rasjid to train indigenuous Indonesian sinologists. During the Indonesian National Revolution, he fought within the Indonesian Navy with the rank of second lieutenant. The academy was later disbanded at the end of the revolution and Abdurrahman, having been recruited as an employee at the foreign department, studied Chinese literature at the University of Indonesia.

Abdurrahman was an active member of the Muslim Students' Association (HMI) during his college years, being a close associate of Deliar Noer, the leader of the Jakarta branch. When Deliar was elected as the general chairman in 1953, he appointed Abdurrahman as his secretary general, or second-in-command. On one occasion, Deliar sent Abdurrahman to deliver a speech at an HMI event in Yogyakarta on his behalf, a decision he later regretted as Gunadirdja's speech were mostly flat. A board member of HMI in Yogyakarta complained to Deliar about Gunadirdja's speech, which he described as having no lasting impression. Abdurrahman completed his college education with a doctorandus in 1955, the same year he stepped down as HMI's secretary general.

== Diplomatic career ==
Abdurrahman began his career at the consulate general in Hong Kong, where he served as a vice consul in 1956. A year later, he was transferred to the consulate general in Singapore with the same diplomatic rank, receiving his exequatur on 18 December 1957. Abdurrahman was in charge of information affairs in Singapore. He was then assigned to the embassy in Manila as press attaché, where he helped prepare the Indonesian contingent for the 10th World Scout Jamboree in 1959. He also pursued master's degree in political sciences at the Far Eastern University.

Abdurrahman was appointed to the embassy in China in 1963 with the diplomatic rank of second secretary. He was promoted to first secretary before being reassigned to Tokyo in 1965. After a three-year stint of handling press and public relations for the embassy, in 1968 he was recalled for a domestic posting. He was sent to the embassy in Washington in early 1970s and became the chief of information of the embassy with the diplomatic rank of minister counsellor.

Abdurrahman became the director of foreign information of the foreign department in 1974, with his primary duty as the department's spokesperson. In 1975 he was entrusted to chair the committee for preparation of the foreign ministry's 30th anniversary. He announced the government's policy of allowing foreign diplomats to observe the 1977 elections and regarding the government's decisions and policies on East Timor. He also denied any sort of military operations in Papua by the government and defended the mass arrests conducted by the government towards alleged communist symphatizers by stating that Indonesia has different standards on human rights. Abdurrahman stepped down from his position and was replaced by Mohammad Hatta on 17 January 1978.

=== Ambassador to Afghanistan ===
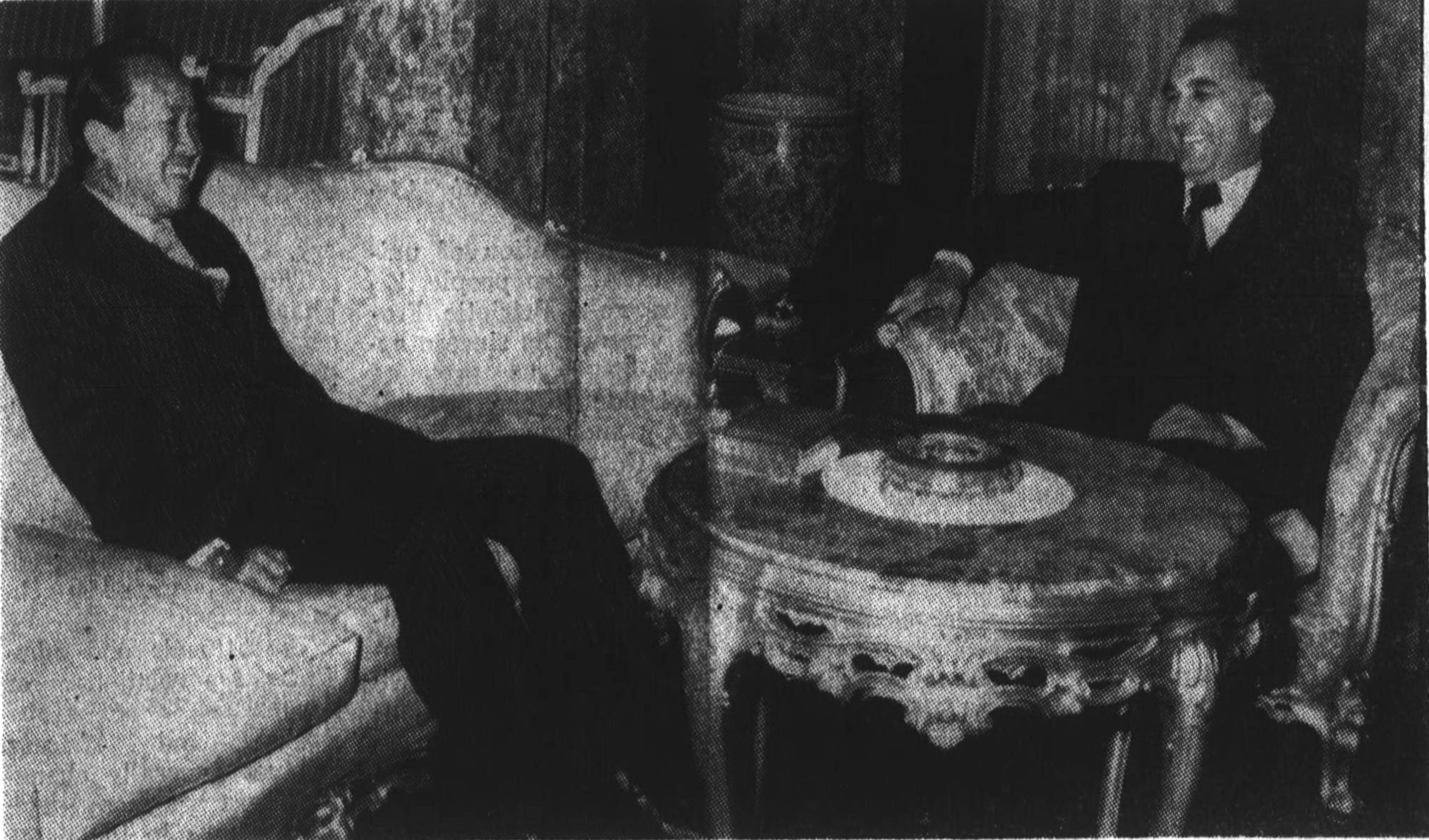
Abdurrahman (left) in a courtesy call with Hafizullah Amin, 1979

Abdurrahman was installed as ambassador to Afghanistan on 14 December 1977 after receiving approval from the Afghan government a month before. He departed for Kabul on 20 January 1978 and presented his credentials to Mohammad Daoud Khan, the President of Afghanistan, on 13 February. He led a four-staff embassy, and throughout his two years of ambassadorship witnessed three violent regime changes. He met with head of government Hafizullah Amin for a courtesy call on 8 October 1979, just two months before his assassination. Shortly after the arrival of Soviet troops in Kabul, Abdurrahman complained about the noise of Soviet planes to the new Soviet ambassador Fikryat Tabeyev, which was ironically agreed by Tabeyev.

As a protest against the Soviet invasion, foreign minister Mochtar Kusumaatmadja recalled Abdurrahman from his post on 2 February 1980. Mochtar's official reason, as stated in his meeting with the parliament, was due to communication difficulties. After reporting the situation in Afghanistan to president Suharto on 21 February, Abdurrahman returned to Kabul to relinquish his ambassadorship, and the post remained vacant until 1988. He was then appointed as the director of Africa and Middle East within the foreign department.

=== Ambassador to Iraq ===
After two years of his directorship, President Suharto nominated Abdurrahman for a second ambassadorial term in Iraq. His nomination was approved by the Iraqi government in October and he was installed as ambassador on 20 November 1982. He presented his credentials to president Saddam Hussein on 20 March 1983. His term ended in April 1986 and he was recalled to took up domestic posting as the director of the foreign department's junior diplomatic education. As part of the foreign department's direct recruitment program, Abdurrahman visited elite universities in Indonesia to gather prospective candidates for the foreign department. Among his interviewees was Arif Havas Oegroseno, who was recruited despite his blunt responses and went on to become the vice foreign minister.

=== Ambassador to China ===
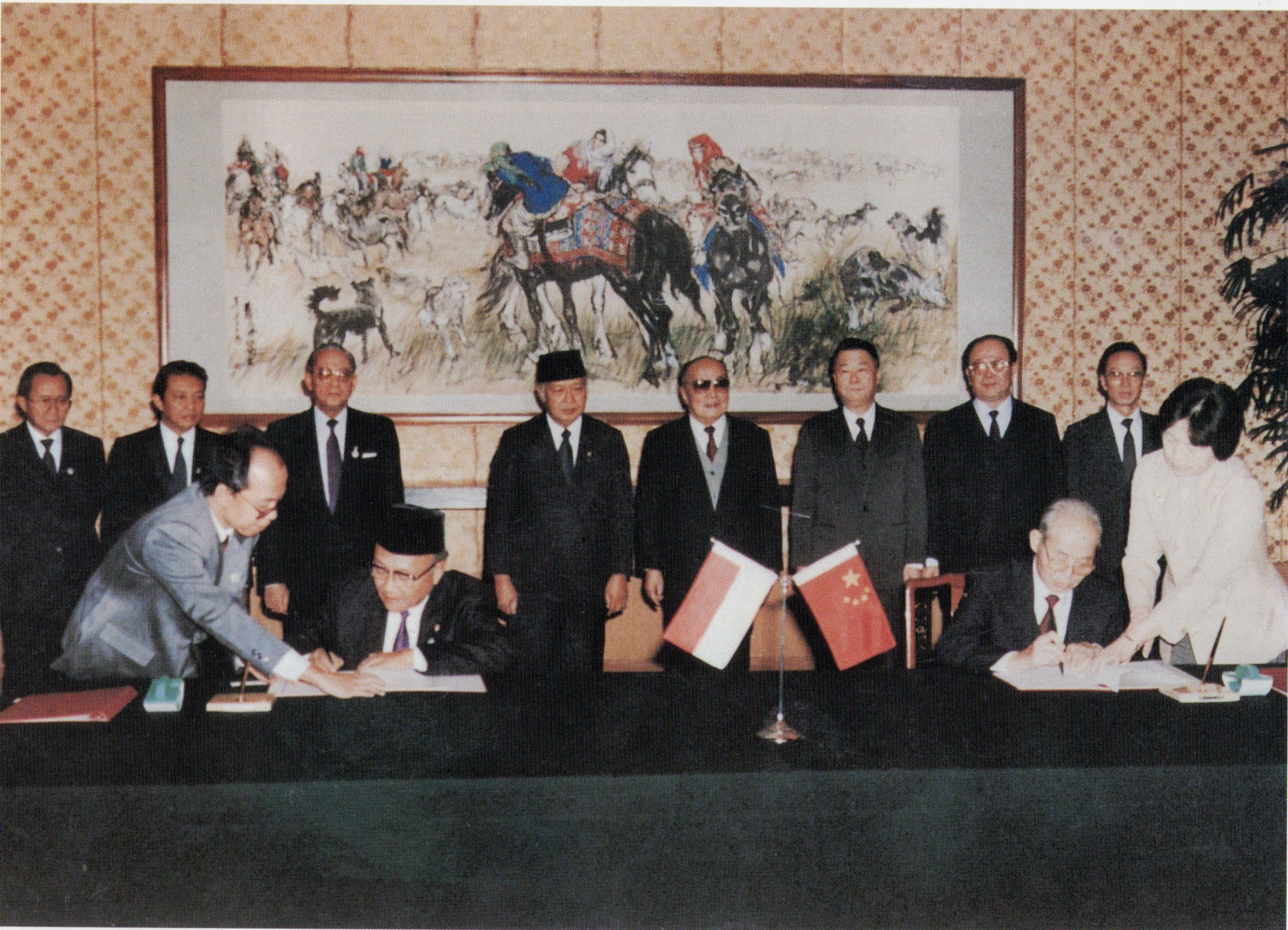
Abdurrahman (first from left) witnessing the signing of agreements between Indonesia and China in 1990.

As the most senior sinologist in the foreign department, Abdurrahman emerged as a front-runner for ambassador to China after the restoration of diplomatic ties on 8 August 1990. Other candidates included military officers Soenarso and Roestandi, as well as journalist Sabam Siagian. Abdurrahman was eventually selected by president Suharto and was sworn in on 24 October 1990. He presented his credentials to the president Yang Shangkun on 13 November. A day after the ceremony, president Suharto made his first state visit to China, where he made a donation of $30,000 to assist the renovation of the Dongsi Mosque in Beijing. Shalih An Shiwei, the grand imam of the mosque, delivered a Chinese and Arab calligraphy to Abdurrahman as a gift to Suharto after the renovation was finished in 1991. He held a reception to introduce himself and his deputy, Colonel H. Ali Sabri Sunaryo, in February 1991.

Early in his term, Abdurrahman had to facilitate an overwhelming influx of visiting ministers, delegations, and athletes, which he managed to handle despite being short-staffed. Abdurrahman counted that by September 1991 he had received seven different cabinet ministers and dozens of entourages. In 1993, Abdurrahman complained about Chinese Indonesian businessmen who invested in China without informing the embassy, emphasizing that investments from Indonesia should always support national development, as directed by the president. The government then announced the appointment of a trade attaché in June 1993, a move viewed by international relations observer Makmur Keliat as stemming from the reinforcement of bilateral relations and the need for an accurate recording of bilateral trade data.

On 21 May 1993, Abdurrahman and his Marshall Island counterpart signed a joint communique on the establishment of Indonesia–Marshall Islands bilateral relations. The joint communique approved the accreditation of Indonesia's ambassador in Beijing to Marshall Islands, while the Marshall Islands ambassador in Beijing is accredited to Indonesia. Abdurrahman never presented his credentials to the Marshall Islands, as he vacated his ambassadorial position on December that year.

== Personal life and later life ==
Abdurrahman was married to Mastura from Padang Sebang, Malacca, whom he met while representing Indonesia at the Malay Cultural Congress in 1957. At that time, Mastura was working in the secretariat of the congress. The couple has three children.

In the lead-up to the 1999 Indonesian legislative election, Abdurrahman joined the Party of Muslims, initiated by Deliar, and became one of the party's chair in its executive council. He was also nominated for a seat in the House of Representatives by the party. The party only obtained less than one percent of the national vote—not enough to secure a single seat—and was disqualified in the next election. He continued his involvement in diplomacy as Indonesian government's delegate to the Boao Forum for Asia in 2001, the honorary consul of Burkina Faso in Indonesia, and as the editor-in-chief of the foreign ministry's Image magazine. He was hospitalized in early 2011 due to an unspecified illness.

Abdurrahman died on 20 November 2017 and was interred at the Tanah Kusir Public Cemetery.
