= Hartono Martodiredjo =

Indonesian air force general and diplomat

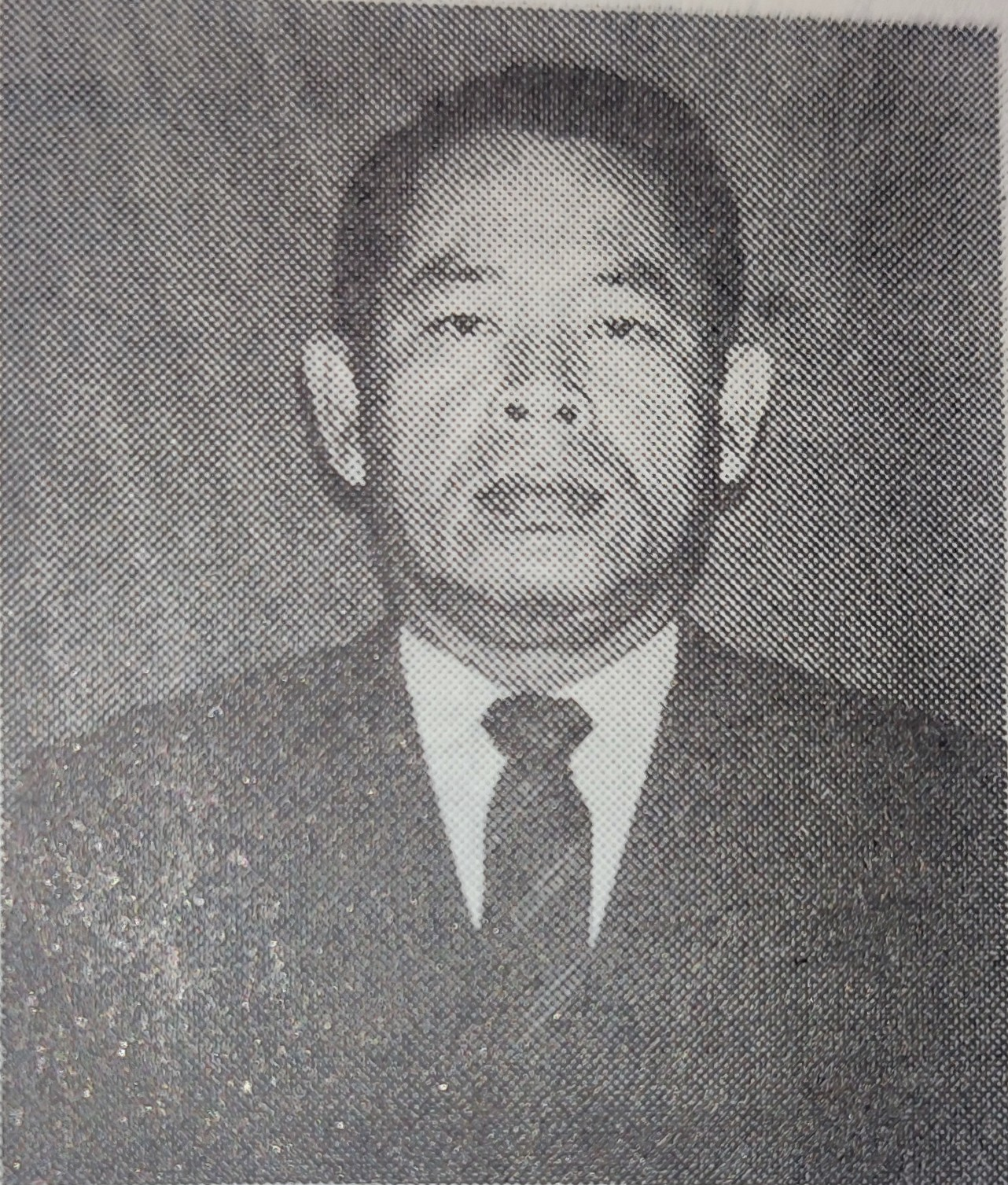

Ambassador of Indonesia to Germany
- In office 21 October 1993 – August 1997
- President: Suharto
- Preceded by: Hasjim Djalal
- Succeeded by: Izhar Ibrahim

Inspector General of the Foreign Department
- In office 20 July 1988 – 25 January 1994
- Minister: Ali Alatas
- Preceded by: Soenarso Djajoesman
- Succeeded by: Syam Soemanagara

Personal details
- Born: March 2, 1934 (age 92) Medan, Dutch East Indies

Military service
- Branch/service: Indonesian Air Force
- Years of service: 1957–1994
- Rank: Air vice marshal
- Unit: Aviator
- Commands: National Air Defense Command; 4th Aerial Regional Command; Air Force Section, Armed Forces Academy

Hartono Martodiredjo (born 2 March 1934) is an Indonesian air force general and diplomat. A vice-marshal of the Indonesian Air Force, Hartono's last position in the air force was as the commander of the national air defense command from 1984 until 1987. He then transitioned into diplomacy, serving as the inspector general of the foreign department from 1988 to 1994 and ambassador to Germany from 1994 until 1997.

== Military career ==
Born on 2 March 1934 in Medan, Hartono completed aviator school (sekolah penerbang) in 1957 and Indonesia's air force command and staff college in 1967. On the same year after completing a course for defence attaches in 1970, he was posted to the embassy in France as air attaché and the senior defence attaché (ketua atase pertahanan).

Following a four-year diplomatic stint, in 1974 Hartono returned to Indonesia and was appointed as the chief of staff of the national operations command. During this period, in 1975 he attended the National Resilience Institute (Lemhannas) as well as a special course between HDCT-Thailand. From 7 September 1978 to 13 October 1980, Hartono was the governor of the air force section of the armed forces academy. During his leadership of the academy, Hartono was the director of the 4th Elang Malindo joint exercise, an air force drill between Malaysian and Indonesian air force. The joint exercise, which lasted from 25 to 30 October 1978, was centered at the Abdul Rachman Saleh Airbase.

From the academy, Hartono was transferred to command the 4th Aerial Regional Command (Komando Daerah Udara IV), headquartered in Surabaya and with jurisdiction over airbases in Central and East Java. Hartono took part in searching the victims of the sinking Tampomas II, where on 29 January 1981 he boarded a Fokker F27 Friendship plane flown from the Juanda airbase. Transport minister Roesmin Nurjadin called off efforts to search victims of the ship sinking two days later.

Hartono was recalled to the air force headquarters, and between 1982 and 1984 served as assistant for operations to the air force chief of staff. He then served as the commander of the national air defense command, a two-star position, from 8 August 1984 to 11 July 1987.

== Diplomatic career ==
Hartono underwent a one-year transitional period in the military, where he was assigned to the air force headquarters as an officer without any specific duties. He officially began his diplomatic career when on 20 July 1988 foreign minister Ali Alatas sworn him in as the inspector general of the foreign department. After six years of service, on 21 October 1993 Hartono became ambassador to Germany. Upon handing over his old duties to Syam Soemanagara of the army on 25 January 1994, he presented his credentials to president Richard von Weizsäcker on 21 February 1994. He served until August 1997.
