= Hasjim Djalal =

Indonesian diplomat (1934–2025)

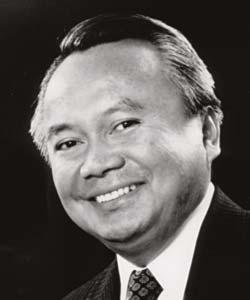

Indonesia Ambassador to Germany
- In office 1990–1993
- President: Suharto
- Preceded by: Sukardi (West Germany); I Gusti Ngurah Gde (East Germany)
- Succeeded by: Hartono Martodiredjo

Indonesia Ambassador to Canada
- In office 1983–1985
- President: Suharto
- Preceded by: Widodo Budidarmo
- Succeeded by: Adiwoso Abubakar

Personal details
- Born: 25 February 1934 Ampek Angkek, Agam, Sumatra's West Coast Residency, Dutch East Indies
- Died: 12 January 2025 (aged 90) Jakarta, Indonesia
- Children: Three, including Dino Patti Djalal
- Education: Foreign Service Academy; University of Virginia

Hasjim Djalal (25 February 1934 – 12 January 2025) was an Indonesian diplomat who served as Ambassador to Germany, Canada, and the United Nations. Djalal was born in Ampek Angkek, Bukittinggi, West Sumatra, on 25 February 1934. He was an expert on international law of the sea, and the chairman and president of the International Seabed Authority. He received his master's and doctorate in international law focusing on maritime issues from the University of Virginia, where he was the university's first Indonesian student. Djalal was the father of Dino Patti Djalal, the former Indonesian Deputy Foreign Minister.

== Early life and education ==
Hasjim Djalal was born in Ampek Angkek, Bukittinggi, on 25 February 1934, and hailed from a farming family. He completed his high school education in Sumatera Barat and later pursued his dream of becoming a diplomat by enrolling in the Foreign Service Academy in Jakarta after graduating from high school in 1953. Hasjim began his career at the Department of Foreign Affairs on 1 January 1957. Six months into his job, he received a scholarship to study at the University of Virginia, where he completed his master's and doctoral degrees. His thesis was titled "The Eisenhower Doctrine in the Middle East" (1959), and his doctoral dissertation was "The Limit of Territorial Sea in International Laws" (1961).

== Diplomatic career ==
Hasjim's interest in maritime issues was sparked during his studies in the United States, inspired by the PRRI/Permesta rebellion in 1957. Upon returning to Indonesia in 1961, he became actively involved in maritime affairs, founding the Indonesian Maritime Law Committee under the coordination of the Maritime Council. He played a significant role in the development of the Wawasan Nusantara concept, which aimed to foster national unity and prevent regional rebellions.

In 1964, Hasjim was posted in Belgrade as the Second Secretary for Political Affairs for two years. He then served as the Deputy Ambassador in Guinea, West Africa. From 1969 to 1972, he was appointed the head of the international law service in the foreign department, where he was focused on handling matters relating to on maritime law issues. For the next four years, Hasjim was stationed in Singapore as the Head of Political Affairs and was involved in matters concerning the Malacca Strait. In 1976, he returned to Indonesia to become the Director of International Agreements until 1979, dealing with Wawasan Nusantara, maritime law, and border issues.

Hasjim was then appointed the Deputy Chief of Mission in Washington, D.C. (1979–1981) and later promoted to the same position at the Permanent Mission of Indonesia to the United Nations in New York (1981–1983). He was also a key negotiator for Indonesia during the ratification of the United Nations Convention on the Law of the Sea (UNCLOS) in 1982, alongside Mochtar Kusumaatmadja, who was the foreign minister at the time.

From 1983 to 1985, Hasjim served as the ambassador to Canada. During this period, he collaborated with Canadian experts on various projects, including workshops on the South China Sea. He then headed the department's research and development agency from 1985 to 1990, in which he would accompany the foreign minister in academic dialogues with university students and academic staffs on various topics. His final diplomatic posting was as the ambassador to Germany from 1990 to 1993. Upon his retirement in February 1994, he was appointed the Ambassador-at-Large for Maritime Affairs. He was elected as the President of the International Seabed Authority in 1996.

== Personal life and death ==
Hasjim was married to Zurni Kalim, and had three children: Budi Irawan, Dino Patti Djalal, and Dini Sari. His son, Dino subsequently served as the Deputy Minister of Foreign Affairs and the spokesperson for President Susilo Bambang Yudhoyono.

Hasjim Djalal died in Jakarta on 12 January 2025, at the age of 90. His funeral was held on 13 January.
