= Eddy Pratomo =

Indonesian diplomat (1953–2026)

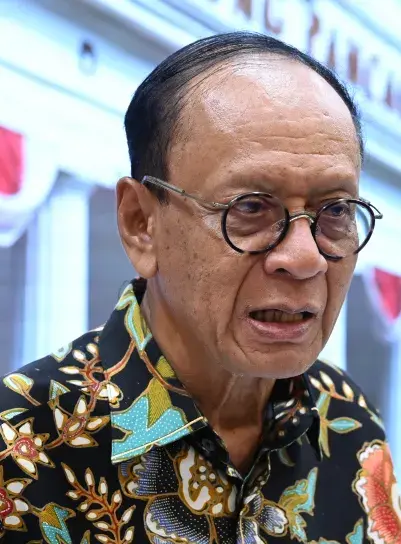
- Pratomo in 2025

Ambassador of Indonesia to Germany
- In office 30 January 2009 – 23 December 2013
- President: Susilo Bambang Yudhoyono
- Preceded by: Makmur Widodo
- Succeeded by: Fauzi Bowo

President's Special Envoy for Indonesian-Malaysian Maritime Delimitation
- In office 10 June 2015 – May 2018
- President: Joko Widodo

Director General of International Law and Treaties
- In office 6 February 2006 – 3 November 2008
- Minister: Hassan Wirajuda
- Preceded by: Mangasi Sihombing (Information, Public Diplomacy, and International Treaties)
- Succeeded by: Arif Havas Oegroseno

Personal details
- Born: 5 October 1953 Semarang, Central Java, Indonesia
- Died: 29 April 2026 (aged 72) Tangerang, West Java, Indonesia
- Spouse: Priharyati
- Children: 3
- Education: 17 August 1945 University of Jakarta (S.H.); Saint John University (MA); Padjadjaran University (Dr.); Diponegoro University (Prof.)

Eddy Pratomo (5 October 1953 – 29 April 2026) was an Indonesian diplomat and law scholar who served as the ambassador to Germany from 2009 and 2013 and President Joko Widodo's special envoy for Indonesian-Malaysian maritime delimitation from 2015 to 2018. A graduate of the 17 August University, Eddy's career in the foreign ministry spanned three decades, culminating with his appointment as the director general of international law and treaties from 2006 to 2008. Following his retirement from the diplomatic service, he transitioned into academia; he taught international law at various Indonesian universities and became a full professor at Diponegoro University. He also served as the dean of the law faculty of Pancasila University from 2020 until his death in 2026.

== Early life, education, and personal life ==
Born in Semarang on 5 October 1953, Eddy began his education in Central Java, where he graduated from the 1st Ngareanak state elementary school in 1966. He pursued his middle school education at a pedagogical preparatory school religious teacher in Kendal, which he completed in 1970. In hopes of pursuing a career in religious matters, he attended a high school for marriage officiant candidates, graduating in 1973.

Instead of becoming a religious official, he studied civil law at the 17 August University and graduated with a bachelor's degree in 1981. He briefly worked as a supervisor for a timber company in Kalimantan before applying for the foreign department. Eddy continued his higher education during his foreign service, receiving his master of arts from Saint John University in New York in 1989 and a doctorate in law from the Padjadjaran University in 2011. Eddy was married to Priharyati and has three children.

== Diplomatic career ==
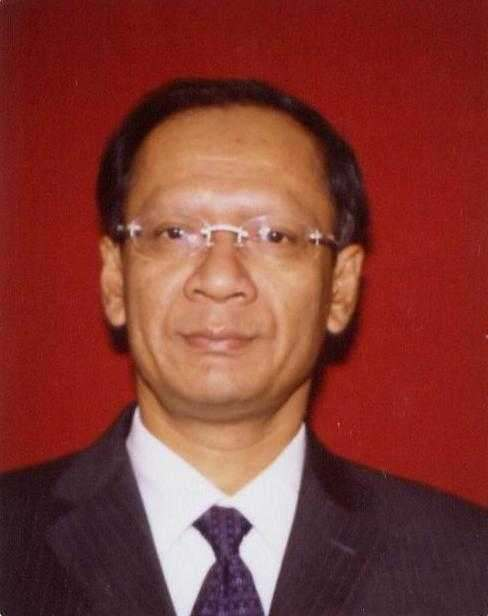
Eddy as the deputy chief of mission in London

Eddy completed his basic diplomatic training in 1984 and began his career as the chief of humanitarian section within the foreign ministry's directorate of international organizations. He was then sent to Indonesia's permanent mission in New York as a diplomat in charge of economic matters between 1986 and 1990. He returned to his old post as section chief for the same portfolio and, during the Non Aligned Movement summit, was entrusted with additional duties as the assistant to the secretary general of the summit's national committee Rais Abin. During this period, he also completed his mid-level diplomatic training in 1993. He was then sent to the permanent mission Geneva in 1994 as the diplomat in charge of political matters. A few years into his term, he was promoted as the permanent mission's chief of political affairs until 1998. During this period, he represented Indonesia in high-stakes human rights discussions regarding Timor-Leste at the United Nations Human Rights Council.

Eddy returned to the foreign ministry in 1998 with his appointment as the deputy director for territorial treaties within the directorate general of politics. In this position, he played a role regarding the negotiations for the Ligitan and Sipadan dispute in the International Court of Justice. The directorate general was abolished in light of organizational restructuring, with the portfolio for international treaties being combined with information and public diplomacy to form the directorate general of information, public diplomacy, and international treaties. Eddy was promoted to the newly established post of the director of economic and socio-cultural treaties on 1 March 2002, where he played a role in negotiations on the continental shelf boundary with Vietnam as the vice chairman of Indonesia's delegation and for the drafting of the UN Convention against Corruption in Vienna. He also attended the senior diplomatic training from 1999 to 2000, which he completed with the distinction as the second best graduate.

In 2002, Eddy was named as the deputy chief of mission in London. Foreign minister Hassan Wirajuda's attempt to appoint him as the deputy permanent representative of Indonesia to the United Nations in New York was superseded by president Megawati Sukarnoputri, who wanted a woman at the helm of Indonesia's UN mission. His appointment to London was met with resistance by ambassador Juwono Sudarsono, who wanted the embassy's political chief Ramli Sa'ud to be his deputy instead. As a result, the embassy staff boycotted his presence, with barely anyone welcoming him upon arrival. Eddy proactively reconciled with Juwono and Ramli by meeting them personally and continued maintaining cordial relations with both personally. After Juwono was recalled to become the defence minister in October 2004, Eddy led the embassy as chargé d'affaires ad interim for one and a half years until the arrival of the new ambassador, Marty Natalegawa, in 2006.

After his stint in London, the foreign minister appointed Eddy as the director general for international law and treaties on 6 February 2006. The new post was formed by splitting the directorate general of information, public diplomacy, and international treaties into two directorate general. In this capacity, he led delegations for the International Maritime Organization regarding the Malacca Strait, chaired negotiations for the voluntary partnership agreement on illegal logging with the EU, and served as vice president for the UN Convention Against Corruption conference in Bali in 2008. During Indonesia's bid for the United Nations Security Council in 2006, Eddy was sent as a special envoy responsible to lobby countries in support of Indonesia. One of Eddy's directors, Arif Havas Oegroseno, took over his position on 3 November 2008.

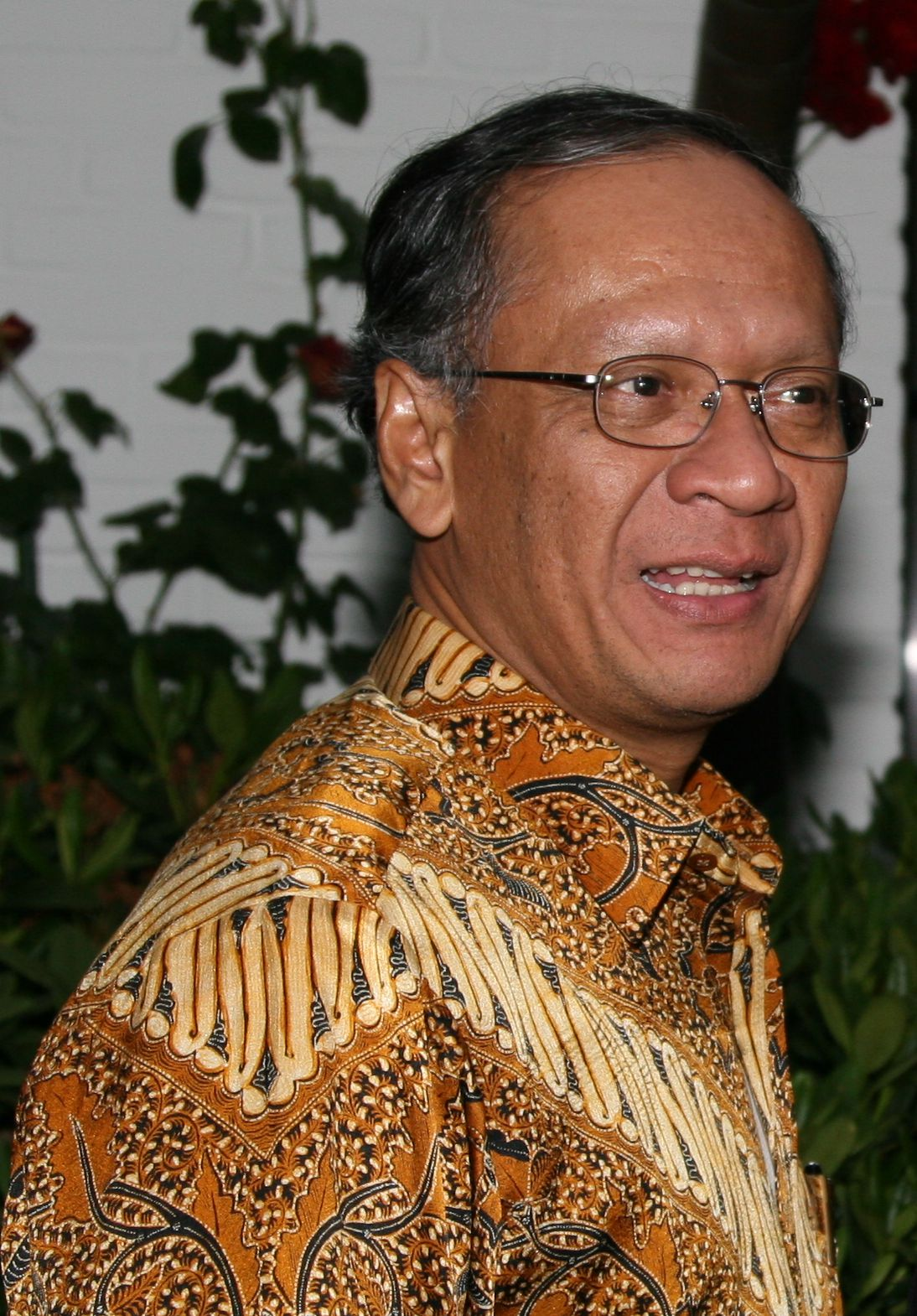
Eddy as ambassador to Germany

Eddy became the ambassador to Germany on 30 January 2009 with a swearing in ceremony led by Susilo Bambang Yudhoyono and presented his credentials to the president of Germany Horst Köhler on 28 April 2009. As ambassador, Eddy organized a public forum called Sarasehan, which invited Indonesians in Germany as well as German Indonesianists to discuss matters relating to Indonesia and spark curiosity from Germans on Indonesia. The public forum was part of his vision to develop a second track diplomacy with Germany. Eddy also took steps to improve the embassy's consular service, with a one-hour visa service being implemented in 2012. Amidst his ambassadorial duties, Eddy continued his works in his previous role, leading the senior officials meeting of the 2009 World Ocean Conference in Manado and advised the Indonesian delegates to the 16th United Nations Framework Convention on Climate Change's Conference of Parties in Cancun, Mexico, in 2010. On his second year in office, Eddy was speculated to return for a domestic posting in relation to his closeness with the new foreign minister Marty Natalegawa. Eddy's term ended on 23 December 2013.

After his ambassadorial term, Eddy was recruited as the legal counsel for Timor Leste's foreign minister José Luís Guterres for a few months, before moving on to work as the advisor for House of Representatives speaker Setya Novanto for international relations between 2014 and 2015. On 10 June 2015, Eddy was appointed the president's special envoy for Indonesian-Malaysian maritime delimitation, where he worked with his Malaysian counterpart Mohd Radzi Abdul Rahman to resolve border issues in five different segments. The post was created as a result of an agreement between Indonesia's president Joko Widodo and Malaysia's prime minister Najib Razak in February that year. Eddy and Mohd Radzi held their first informal consultations in August, and a formal meeting involving the foreign ministers was held in October. Eddy's duty as special envoy ended with the final rounds of discussion on maritime borders being held around May 2018.

== Later career and death ==
Eddy entered academia after his retirement from diplomatic service. He joined Pancasila University in 2017 and taught international law. He chaired the university's international law department in July 2017 and was elected as the university's law faculty dean in May 2020. He was re-appointed for a second four-year term on 2 May 2024. As dean, Eddy launched the law clinic, a program to help law students practicing their skill before graduating, and sparked controversy for promoting junior attorney general Reda Manthovani to a full professor in 2024 due to his publications in predatory journals and skipping academic ranks. He also taught at Diponegoro University in 2018 and was appointed an adjunct full professor in international law on 8 March 2019.

Outside academia, Eddy was involved in a variety of businesses, ranging from medical instrument production to waste management. He held various chairmanships and commissioner roles in industries, including his role as a senior partner at the law firm Alfonso and Partners. In May 2025, the foreign ministry announced Eddy's nomination as International Tribunal for the Law of the Sea (ITLOS) judge. Receptions were held to introduce his candidacy at the permanent mission in New York and at the embassy Den Haag.

Eddy died at the Mandaya Hospital in Tangerang, Banten, on the morning of 29 April 2026, at the age of 72. Following his death, foreign ministry spokesperson Vahd Mulachela stated that it would re-evaluate its nomination for the ITLOS.
