= Albert Matondang =

Indonesian diplomat

Ambassador of Indonesia to Portugal
- In office 20 January 2010 – 2014
- President: Susilo Bambang Yudhoyono
- Preceded by: Francisco Xavier Lopes da Cruz
- Succeeded by: Mulya Wirana

Deputy for Foreign Policy Coordination
- In office 17 March 2005 – 2010
- Preceded by: Amin Rianom
- Succeeded by: Nadjib Riphat Kesoema

Ambassador of Indonesia to Fiji
- In office 30 September 2002 – 28 February 2005
- President: Megawati Sukarnoputri; Susilo Bambang Yudhoyono
- Preceded by: Susanto Sutoyo (non-resident)
- Succeeded by: Bambang Guritno

Personal details
- Education: Trisakti University (S.H.)

Albert Matondang is an Indonesian diplomat who twice served as an ambassador. He was ambassador to Fiji from 2002 to 2005 and to Portugal from 2010 to 2014. Between his ambassadorial terms, he was the deputy for foreign policy coordination in the office of the coordinating ministry for political, security, and legal affairs.

== Education ==
Albert received his bachelor's degree in law from the Trisakti University in 1976 and completed postgraduate education in diplomacy at the Lady Margaret Hall college of the University of Oxford between 1986 and 1987.

== Diplomatic career ==
Albert began his diplomatic career in 1976, with his maiden overseas posting at the embassy in Tokyo in 1980. He began his tenure as an intern with the rank of attaché before being promoted to a full staff with the rank of third secretary. After several years of service, he was promoted to second secretary, and by 1983 reassigned to the consulate general in Hong Kong. Following a five-year domestic posting, which lasted until 1988, he was sent to Seoul, where he became the embassy's spokesperson with the diplomatic rank of first secretary in charge of socio-cultural and information affairs. After another two years in the foreign ministry, in 1995 he was sent to the embassy in Australia to head its political affairs with the diplomatic rank of minister counsellor. Albert then became the foreign department's chief of training and education agency from 1999 to 2002.

In early 2002, president Megawati Sukarnoputri nominated him as Indonesia's first resident ambassador to Fiji following a visit by the foreign department secretary general Arizal Effendi in February that year. He passed the parliamentary selection in June and was sworn in on 30 September 2002. Shortly before his arrival, on 22 August the embassy was opened by the director general of Asia, Pacific, and Africa Makarim Wibisono. He presented his credentials to president Josefa Iloilo in November and paid a courtesy call to prime minister Laisenia Qarase. During his tenure, Albert relayed material and non-material assistance from the Indonesian government to Fiji farmers to improve agriculture outputs. After the 2004 Indian Ocean earthquake and tsunami, which devastated Indonesian provinces of Aceh and North Sumatra, the embassy received donations and assistance, which was welcomed by Albert. Albert's term ended on 28 February 2005, and on 17 March 2005 he became the deputy for foreign policy coordination in the office of the coordinating ministry for political, security, and legal affairs.

Albert was nominated by president Susilo Bambang Yudhoyono as ambassador to Portugal in August 2009. After successfully passing an assessment by the House of Representative's first commission, Albert was sworn in on 20 January 2010. Albert presented his credentials to president on 28 April 2010. During his tenure, he oversaw the signing of an MoU between Indonesia's national news agency Antara and its Portuguese counterpart Lusa in 2011 and a state visit from Portuguese president Aníbal Cavaco Silva—the first of its kind—in 2012. Albert retired from diplomacy in 2014 and became a senior counsel for the Jakarta-based Nah’R Murdono law office.
