= Makmur Widodo =

Indonesian diplomat (born 1945)

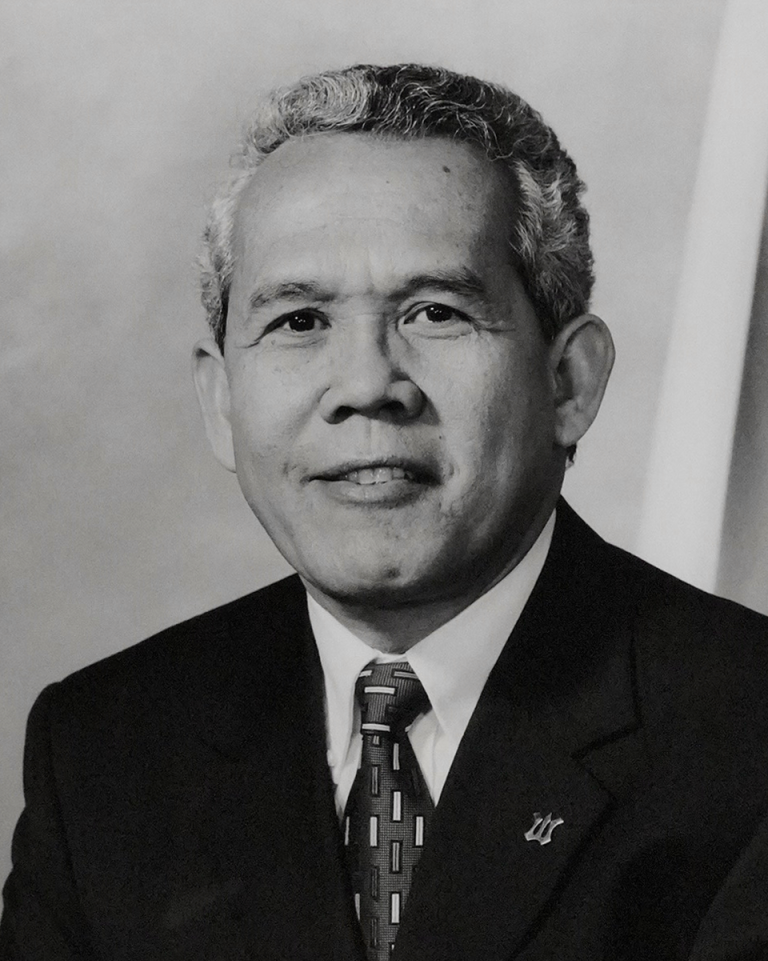
- Makmur in 2001

Ambassador of Indonesia to Germany
- In office 7 October 2004 – September 2008
- President: Megawati Sukarnoputri; Susilo Bambang Yudhoyono
- Preceded by: Rahardjo Jamtomo; I Gde Djelantik (acting)
- Succeeded by: Eddy Pratomo

Director General of Multilateral Political, Social, and Security Affairs
- In office 3 May 2002 – 7 October 2004
- Minister: Hassan Wirajuda
- Preceded by: Marty Natalegawa (as Director of International Organizations)
- Succeeded by: Mochamad Slamet Hidayat (Multilateral Affairs)

Permanent Representative of Indonesia to the United Nations
- In office 23 April 2001 – 25 April 2002
- President: Abdurrahman Wahid; Megawati Sukarnoputri
- Preceded by: Makarim Wibisono
- Succeeded by: Rezlan Ishar Jenie

Personal details
- Born: 1 August 1945 (age 81) Surakarta, Central Java, Indonesia
- Education: Gadjah Mada University (Drs.); Ohio University (MA)

Makmur Widodo (born 1 August 1945) is an Indonesian diplomat and journalist who served as Indonesia's permanent representative to the United Nations from 2001 to 2002 and ambassador to Germany from 2004 to 2008. A career diplomat, Makmur had served in a multitude of positions in the foreign ministry, including as director of international organizations from 1997 to 1999 and the first director-general of multilateral affairs, covering political, social, and security issues, from 2002 to 2004.

== Early life and education ==
Makmur Widodo was born on 1 August 1945 in a village near Surakarta, Central Java. He is the second-to-last child of his parents' 12 children. Makmur described himself as an orang kampung (villager) and stated that he was the only member of his family to ever leave his village. As a child, Makmur was interested in history and linguistics. He read a lot and learned about the outside world by watching American movies.

Makmur entered the Gadjah Mada University in Yogyakarta in 1963, studying international relations for five years until he graduated with a bachelor's degree. During his studies, Makmur took a part-time job as a guide for tourists in Yogyakarta. Upon finishing college, Makmur successfully applied for a Fulbright scholarship to study the same subject at Ohio University. Upon arriving in Ohio, he immediately bought a pair of jeans, a red shirt and a cowboy hat. After completing his studies, Makmur returned to Indonesia and began working as a journalist for the state-owned Antara news agency, although he was initially a bit reluctant due to the stigma of corruption amongst civil servants at that time. Makmur also took part in the Malari incident, which was a protest in opposition to Japan's industrial and commercial dominance in Indonesia.

== Diplomatic career ==
Makmur began working for the foreign department in 1975, being appointed to head the Central America and Caribbean section two years later. In 1980, Makmur, already with the rank of third secretary, was sent to head the information department of the embassy in Sweden. After four years of duty in the embassy, he returned for his appointment as the head of section at Indonesia's ASEAN national secretariat. He was further promoted in 1986 to the diplomatic rank of first secretary and became the head of the disarmament section within Indonesia's permanent mission to the UN in New York.

After his posting in New York, Makmur continued to serve in various postings related to multilateral relations, describing himself as "a specialist in multilateral relations". He was then appointed as the deputy director for non-UN international organizations between 1991 and 1993 before returning to an overseas posting, this time as the political chief at the permanent mission to UN bodies based in Geneva with the diplomatic rank of minister counsellor. In 1997, Makmur became the foreign ministry's director of international organizations, a position he held for two years until he became the deputy permanent representative to the United Nations in New York in September 1999. During this period, Makmur was part of Indonesia's delegation for a tripartite meeting on East Timor. Following the appointment of permanent representative Makarim Wibisono as the director-general of foreign economic relations in 2000, Makmur became the permanent mission's chargé d'affaires ad interim.

Less than a year later, on 23 April 2001 Makmur became Indonesia's permanent representative to the United Nations. He presented his credentials to secretary-general Kofi Annan on 23 May. During the presentation of credentials, Annan proposed Indonesia's permanent membership within the United Nations Security Council as representative of the Islamic world. Makmur was also accredited as ambassador to the Bahamas, Jamaica, Guatemala, and Nicaragua. Although his term was supposed to end in 2004, in 2002 he was recalled to Jakarta due to organizational restructuring within the foreign ministry. He left his post on 25 April 2002 and was appointed to lead the newly established directorate general of multilateral political, social, and security affairs and was sworn in on 3 May 2002. As director-general, Makmur was Indonesia's head of delegation to the 2003 Senior Officials Meeting of the Non-Aligned Movement in Kuala Lumpur, during which he expressed his support for Timor-Leste's membership in the organization.

On 7 October 2004, Makmur became Indonesia's ambassador to Germany. His director-general position remained vacant until the agency was abolished to form a unified multilateral directorate general. Makmur arrived on 31 December 2004, just five days after the 2004 Indian Ocean earthquake and tsunami that struck the northern parts of the island of Sumatra, and presented his credentials to president Horst Köhler on 10 January 2005. In response to the disaster, Makmur had partnership discussions with Germany on disaster mitigation initiatives and gathered assistance and donations from various entities in Germany. His term ended in September 2008.
