= Permanent Representative of Indonesia to the United Nations =

Permanent Representative of the Republic of Indonesia to the United Nations Accredited to the ISA
- Utusan Tetap Republik Indonesia untuk Perserikatan Bangsa-Bangsa
- Emblem of the Ministry of Foreign Affairs

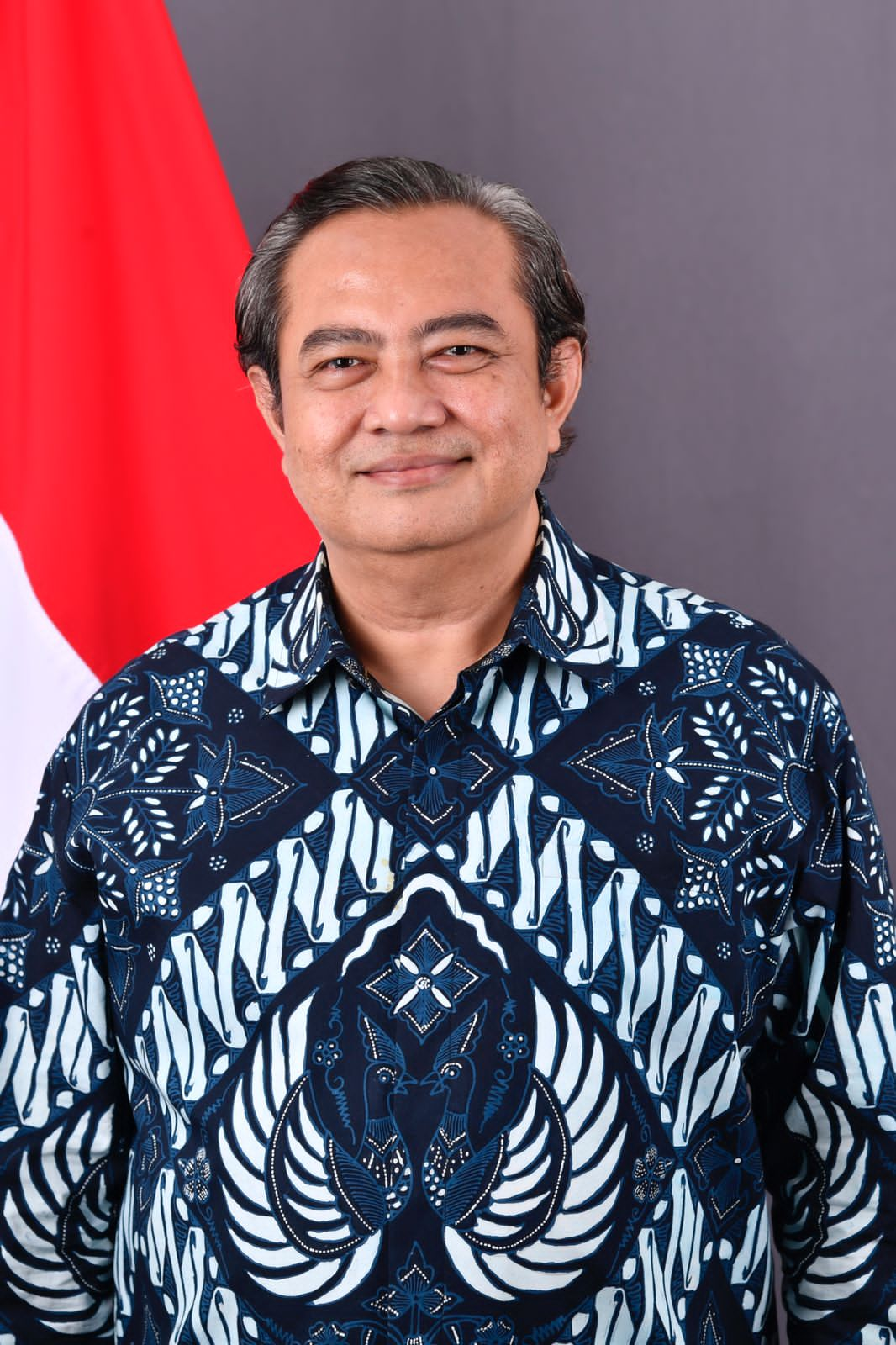
- Incumbent; Umar Hadi since 19 September 2025
- Ministry of Foreign Affairs; Permanent Mission of Indonesia to the United Nations
- Style: His Excellency (formal)
- Seat: New York, United States
- Appointer: President of Indonesia
- Inaugural holder: Lambertus Nicodemus Palar
- Formation: 1950
- Website: kemlu.go.id/newyork-un

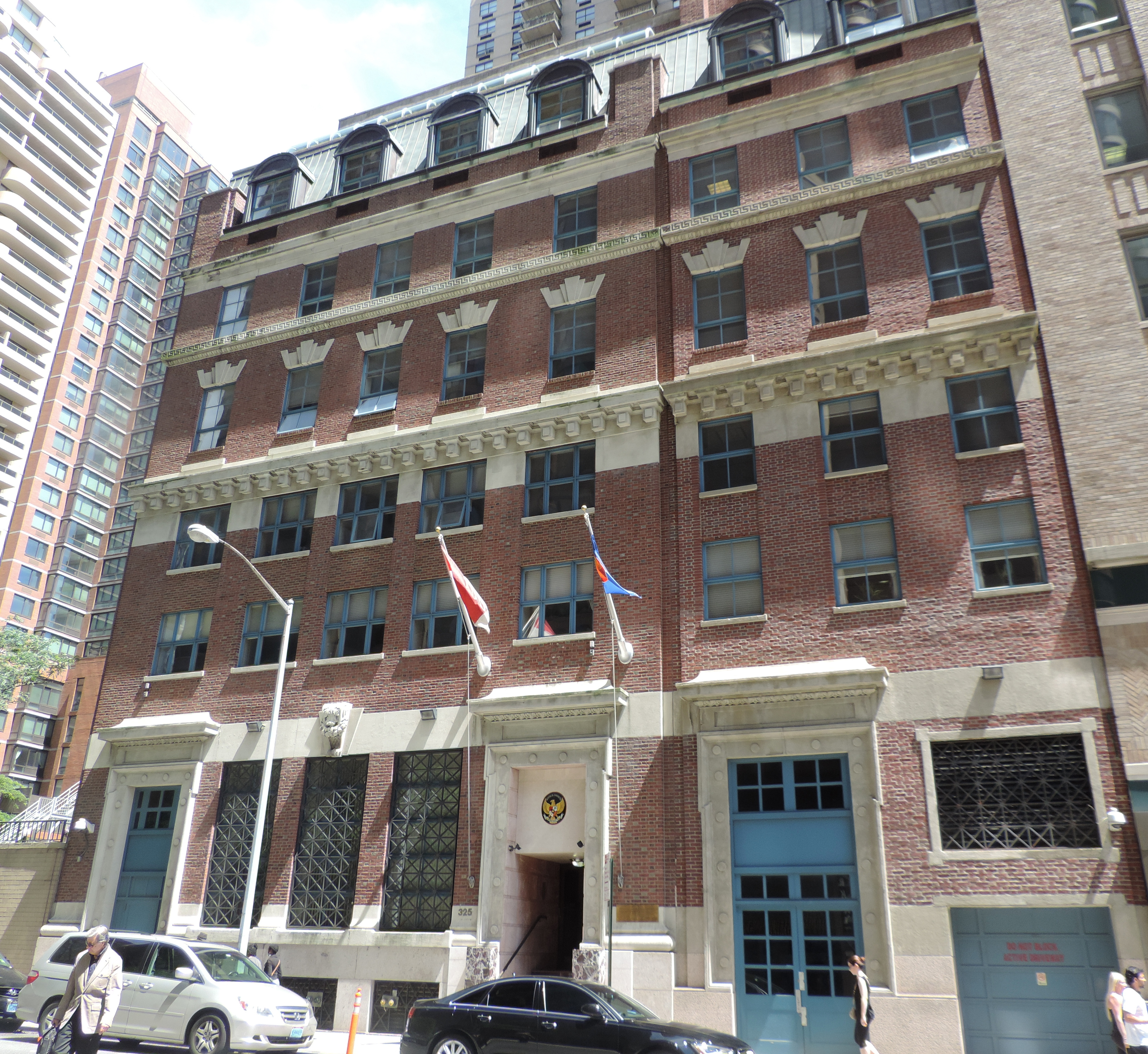
The mission office at 325 East 38th Street in Manhattan.

The following are the list of Indonesian diplomats that served as Permanent Representative of the Republic of Indonesia to the United Nations:

- Lambertus Nicodemus Palar, 1950–1953
- Sudjarwo Tjondronegoro, 1953–1957
- Ali Sastroamidjojo, 1957–1960
- Sukarjo Wiryopranoto, 1960–1962
- Lambertus Nicodemus Palar, 1962–1965
- Ruslan Abdulgani, 1967–1972
- Chaidir Anwar Sani, 1972–1979
- Abdullah Kamil, 1979–1982
- Ali Alatas, 1982–1988
- Nana Sutresna, 1988–1992
- Nugroho Wisnumurti, 1992–1997
- Makarim Wibisono, 1997–2001
- Makmur Widodo, 2001–2002
- Rezlan Ishar Jenie, 2004–2007
- Marty Natalegawa, 2007–2009
- Hassan Kleib, 2010–2011
- Desra Percaya, 2012–2015
- Dian Triansyah Djani, 2016–2021
- Arrmanatha Nasir, 2021-2024
- Umar Hadi, 2025-present

== Deputy permanent representatives ==
The permanent representative is assisted by a deputy with the diplomatic rank of ambassador. In the event of Indonesia's election to the United Nations Security Council, a second deputy representative is appointed to handle Indonesia's membership in the UNSC.

- Johan Boudewijn Paul Maramis, 1969-1972
- Yoga Sugama, 1971-1974
- August Marpaung, 1974-1978
- Purbo Sugiarto Suwondo, 1978-1981
- Hasjim Djalal, 1981-1983
- Poedji Koentarso, 1983-1985
- Wiryono Sastrohandoyo, 1985-1988
- Agus Tarmidzi, 1988-1989
- Nugroho Wisnumurti, 1989-1992
- Witjaksana Soegarda, 1992-1995
- Makarim Wibisono, 1994-1997 (UNSC)
- Isslamet Poernomo, 1995-1997
- Arizal Effendi, 1997-1999
- Makmur Widodo, 1999-2001
- Mochamad Slamet Hidayat, 2001-2003
- Rezlan Ishar Jenie, 2003-2004
- Wieke Adiwoso, 2004-2009
- Hasan Kleib, 2007-2008 (UNSC), 2010-2011
- Yusra Khan, 2011-2015
- Muhammad Anshor, 2015-2016
- Ina Hagniningtyas Krisnamurthi, 2016-2019
- Muhsin Syihab, 2019-2020 (UNSC)
- Mohammad Kurniadi Koba, 2019-2022
- Hari Prabowo, 2023-2025
- Widya Sadnovic, 2025-now
- Yvonne Mewengkang, 2026-now

== See also ==
- Indonesia and the United Nations
- Foreign relations of Indonesia
