= Rezlan Ishar Jenie =

Indonesian diplomat (born 1952)

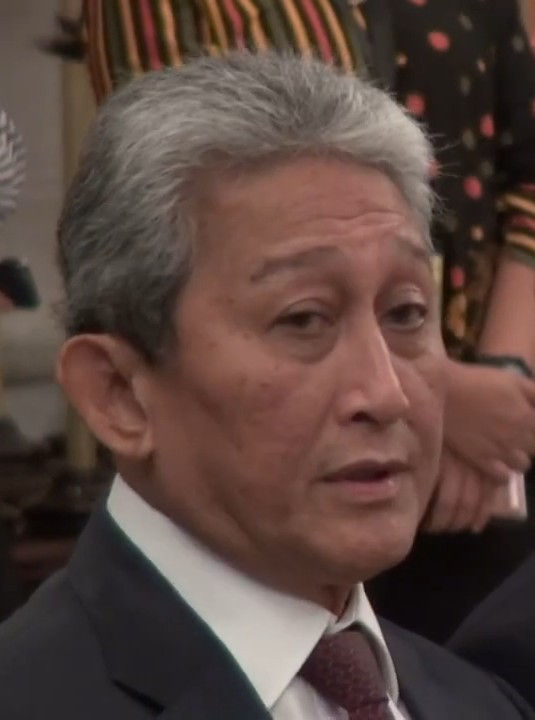

Ambassador of Indonesia to France
- In office 10 August 2010 – 2014
- President: Susilo Bambang Yudhoyono
- Preceded by: Arizal Effendi; Maruli Tua Sagala (CDA)
- Succeeded by: Hotmangaradja Pandjaitan

Director General of Multilateral Affairs
- In office June 2007 – August 2010
- Preceded by: Mochamad Slamet Hidayat
- Succeeded by: Hasan Kleib

Permanent Representative of Indonesia to the United Nations
- In office 20 June 2003 – June 2007; Chargé d'affaires ad interim until 13 April 2004
- President: Megawati Sukarnoputri; Susilo Bambang Yudhoyono
- Preceded by: Makmur Widodo
- Succeeded by: Marty Natalegawa

Director General of Political Affairs
- Acting
- In office 9 August 2001 – 3 May 2002
- Preceded by: Hassan Wirajuda
- Succeeded by: office abolished

Personal details
- Born: 6 June 1952 (age 74) Jakarta, Indonesia
- Spouse: Sally Yukari Budiardjo
- Relations: Umar Anggara Jenie (cousin); Said Djauharsyah Jenie (cousin)
- Children: 2
- Parent(s): Adlinsjah Jenie (father); Khailan Syamsu (mother)
- Education: University of Indonesia (Drs.)

Rezlan Ishar Jenie (born 6 June 1952) is an Indonesian diplomat who served as chargé d'affaires ad interim, and later permanent representative, of Indonesia to the United Nations in New York from 2003 to 2007 and ambassador to France from 2010 to 2014.

== Early life and education ==
Born on 6 June 1952 to career diplomat Adlinsjah Jenie and human rights activist Khailan Syamsu, Rezlan is the eldest of the couple's five children. His cousins from his father's side, Umar Anggara Jenie and Said Djauharsyah Jenie, were both scientists who went on to become the chief of Agency for the Assessment and Application of Technology and the Indonesian Institute of Sciences, respectively. Rezlan completed his college education in political sciences at the University of Indonesia in 1981.

== Diplomatic career ==
Rezlan joined the foreign department in 1981. His first overseas assignment was at the permanent mission in Geneva, where he served from July 1984 to March 1988. After a three-year domestic assignment in the foreign minister's office from April 1988 to October 1991, he was sent to the permanent mission in New York, being attached to the political section with the diplomatic rank of first secretary. He served until June 1996 and underwent several promotions, before returning to the foreign department's base as a deputy director within the directorate of international organizations from July 1996 to December 1998.

=== Portugal assignment ===
In late 1998, Indonesia was in the process of re-establishing diplomatic relations with Portugal, which had been strained due to Indonesia's annexation of East Timor. The thaw was the result of informal talks between Portugal's prime minister Antonio Guterres and Indonesia's president Suharto during the ASEAN-EU meeting in Bangkok. Further negotiations during the Habibie regime resulted in an agreement for the establishment of an interest section, with Indonesia being represented by the Thailand embassy in Portugal as its protecting power. In December 1998, the foreign ministry's director general for political affairs Nugroho Wisnumurti announced that Rezlan would be heading the interests section.

The interests section was opened on 15 January 1999, and Rezlan began his duties several days later. Due to the East Timor issue that shrouded his appointment, the interest section garnered significant attention from the Portuguese populace, with the Thai embassy's security being strengthened as a result. The two-man mission received a massive volume of remote interactions, with frequent faxes and phone calls received. According to Rezlan, while some callers were polite and civil, others were highly aggressive or emotional, sometimes calling just to abruptly hang up as a form of protest.

Rezlan's frequent media appearance also made him a recognizable figure on national television. Rezlan and Havas were accused as military intelligence officers by the Timorese diaspora in Portugal, a claim which was summarily rebuked by their Portuguese counterpart in Jakarta, Ana Gomes. Rezlan was frequently approached by passersby on the street, who expressed either their support or disapproval to Indonesia's actions in East Timor. Despite the public outrage, there were no street-level protests at the actual building, with the Portuguese government deeming it safe enough to station a single police officer.

During his tenure, Rezlan worked to mend relations between the two countries through audiences with Portuguese politicians and cultural promotion. Diplomatic relations were officially re-established through a joint communique on 29 December 1999, with the interest section becoming a standalone embassy in the same month, and Rezlan retaining his leadership as the chargé d'affaires ad interim for a few months. Rezlan admitted that attempts to increase person-to-person contacts stalled as the embassy only managed to issue 130 visas for Portuguese businessmen and tourists wanting to visit Bali. By the end of the year, Harry Pryohoetomo Haryono was appointed as ambassador, and Rezlan was recalled to the foreign department.

=== UN assignment ===
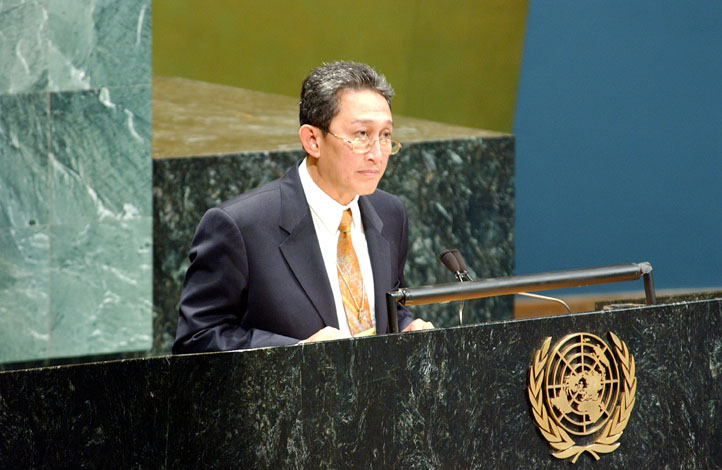
Rezlan Ishar Jenie speaking at the 58th United Nations General Assembly in 2003.

After his posting in Portugal, Rezlan became the foreign department's director of America, serving under the province of the director general of politics Hassan Wirajuda. Hassan stepped down from his post in light of his appointment as foreign minister, and Rezlan was tapped as his acting replacement. In 2002, Rezlan summoned Singapore's chargé d'affaires ad interim in light of former prime minister Lee Kuan Yew statement regarding the presence of terrorists in Indonesia. Reorganizations conducted by Hassan effectively abolished both the America directorate and the directorate general of politics, and Rezlan was assigned to the foreign minister's office as an official-in-waiting.

On 20 March 2002, Rezlan was nominated by president Megawati Sukarnoputri as permanent representative to the United Nations. The House of Representatives objected his appointment as he was considered too young for the posting and recommended him to take a prior bilateral ambassadorial assignment before going for the UN. Siswo Pramono, a diplomat who would later go on to become Indonesia's ambassador to Australia, criticized the objections by the House and stated that "age is irrelevant in the quest to determine who is a good diplomat". In order to circumvent the parliamentary approval, Hassan appointed Rezlan as the deputy permanent representative, which requires no parliamentary consent, on 30 June 2003. As the permanent representative post was vacant, Rezlan immediately becomes the chargé d'affaires ad interim, or acting permanent representative. After a year of serving in a temporary capacity, on 31 March 2004 Rezlan was installed as the permanent representative by Megawati. Rezlan presented his credentials to Secretary-General of the United Nations Kofi Annan exactly two weeks later on 13 April.

Rezlan's appointment happened against a backdrop of proposed institutional reforms, in light of its inability to prevent the United States-led 2003 invasion of Iraq. Such reforms included the establishment of the United Nations Human Rights Council, Peacebuilding Commission, and a revamp of the UN's secretariat. Rezlan advocated for a return to "multilateralism" by increasing the number of permanent members of the United Nations Security Council. Under his leadership, in 2006 all of Indonesia's nine nominations for UN bodies, including the prestigious Security Council and Economic and Social Council were accepted. Rezlan began his duties as Indonesia's representative in the UNSC on 23 November 2006, assisted by his two deputies and two junior diplomats as alternate delegates.

Aside from his main job in the UN, Rezlan was also accredited as Indonesia's ambassador to the Bahamas, Guatemala, Jamaica, and Nicaragua. Rezlan presented his credentials to the Governor-General of the Bahamas Ivy Dumont on 24 June 2004 and to the president of Nicaragua Enrique Bolaños on 23 July 2004. In October 2005, Rezlan appointed director of the Jamaican Port Authority, Noel Arthur Anthony Hylton, as honorary consul for Jamaica.

=== Director general of multilateral affairs ===
Rezlan was recalled for appointment as the director general of multilateral affairs in June 2007, replacing Mochamad Slamet Hidayat who stepped down in light of investigation on his role in embezzlement. As director general, Rezlan oversees Indonesia's membership in a number of organizations, including the UN, G20, and the Non-Aligned Movement. In November that year, Rezlan was involved in brokering talks between the Philippines and the Moro National Liberation Front, in his capacity as chairman of the OIC Peace Committee for Southern Philippines. Rezlan's work within the framework of the OIC resulted in a MoU between Philippines and the MNLF, signed in 2010. Rezlan also negotiated Indonesia's participation in the Kyoto Protocol during the 2007 United Nations Climate Change Conference in Bali, and chaired the D-8 Organization for Economic Cooperation during Indonesia's chairmanship from 2007 to 2008. Rezlan's leadership of D-8 resulted in a roadmap for economic and social cooperation for its second decade between 2008 and 2018.

=== Ambassador to France ===
Rezlan was nominated by President Susilo Bambang Yudhoyono as ambassador to France, with concurrent accreditation to Monaco and Andorra. He passed an assessment by the House of Representative's first commission on 3 May 2010 and was sworn in on 10 August. He presented his credentials to the president of France Nicolas Sarkozy on 3 December 2010, to the co-prince of Andorra Joan Enric Vives i Sicília on 14 March, and to Albert II, Prince of Monaco, on 22 March 2011.

Rezlan was Indonesia's first ambassador to Monaco as well as the first one to be dual accredited as permanent delegate to UNESCO. Rezlan presented his credentials to the director general of UNESCO Irina Bokova on 19 October 2011. Indonesia's permanent delegation to UNESCO, previously a standalone entity, was integrated within the embassy during Rezlan's term. The post reserved for academicians was instead the deputy permanent representative, which was accorded the diplomatic rank of ambassador and assisted the ambassador in carrying out its duties. The first official to be appointed for the position, Carmadi Machbub of the Bandung Institute of Technology, remarked that Indonesia, along with Laos and Austria, was the only country to have its permanent delegation integrated with its French embassy. This arrangement remains in force to this day.

== Personal life and later life ==
Rezlan is married to Sally Yukari Budiardjo, whom he met in Japan in 1979. His older daughter, Anggi Sazika Jenie, followed his footsteps in diplomacy, while his younger son, Ken Yudistira Jenie, is a musician.

Rezlan continued his role in diplomacy after retiring from the foreign ministry in 2014. On 17 October 2017, Rezlan officially became the executive director of the ASEAN Institute for Peace and Reconciliation (AIPR). During his tenure, in 2018 the Indonesian foreign ministry signed the host country agreement for AIPR, effectively covering its operational costs. His term ended on 30 October 2020.
