= Andradjati =

Indonesian diplomat (born 1956)

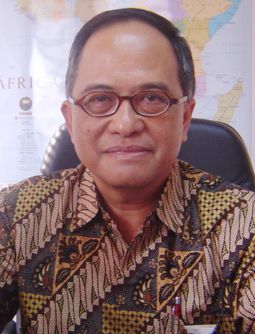

Ambassador of Indonesia to Senegal, Ivory Coast, The Gambia, Guinea-Bissau, Gabon, Democratic Republic of the Congo, Guinea, Mali, and Sierra Leone
- In office 21 December 2011 – January 2016
- President: Susilo Bambang Yudhoyono; Joko Widodo
- Preceded by: Sukarni Sikar
- Succeeded by: Mansyur Pangeran

Personal details
- Born: 23 March 1956 (age 70) Jakarta, Indonesia
- Education: Padjadjaran University (Drs.); Université libre de Bruxelles (M.IP)

Andradjati (born 23 March 1956) is an Indonesian career diplomat who served as ambassador to Senegal, with concurrent accreditation to Ivory Coast, The Gambia, Guinea-Bissau, Gabon, Democratic Republic of the Congo, Guinea, Mali, and Sierra Leone from 2012 to 2016. He previously was the director of Africa within the foreign ministry from 2010 to 2012. A Padjadjaran University graduate, Andradjati's career spanned several decades and involved assignments in Canada, Austria, Belgium, Singapore, and South Africa.

== Early life and education ==
Born in Jakarta on 23 March 1956, Andradjati spent most of his childhood in Bogor. He completed his basic education at the 1st Bogor Pabrik Gas state elementary school from 1962 to 1968, 1st Bogor state junior high school from 1969 to 1971, and the 1st Bogor state high school from 1972 to 1974.

Andradjati began studying international relations at the Padjadjaran University in 1975 and received his bachelor's degree in 1980. Upon graduating, Andradjati wanted to taught at his almamater, but also applied for the foreign ministry. As the administrative process to become a lecturer proved lengthy, he decided to join the foreign ministry in 1981. He completed his basic diplomatic education on the same year after he joined. He studied international politics at the Université libre de Bruxelles from 1998 until he graduated with master's degree in 2000.

== Diplomatic career ==
Andradjati began his career as a staff within the foreign ministry's directorate of international organizations from 1982 to 1984. His maiden overseas assignment was at the embassy in Ottawa, where he interned for a year with the rank of attaché before being promoted as a staff with the rank of third secretary. During his stint in the embassy, he was tasked as to drive for the environment minister, Emil Salim, to an event because the designated driver was unavailable. Despite his unfamiliarity with the electric systems of the Cadillac vehicle and the challenges of winter driving—specifically managing the heater and defogging the windshield—he successfully delivered Emil to his destination on time.

Following his return to Indonesia, Andradjati served as the section chief within the directorate of developing countries' economic relations from 1988 to 1990. During this period, he completed a Pancasila indoctrination course in 1989. He was then posted to the embassy in Vienna, Austria, as the deputy chief of economic affairs from 1990 to 1994. Upon returning to the foreign ministry's central office, he assumed the role of deputy director (chief of subdirectorate) for investment and financial cooperation within West Europe from 1995 to 1998. Andradjati completed his senior diplomatic education from 1996 to 1997 before undertaking an administration training held jointly by the state administration agency and the foreign ministry in 1997.

Andradjati's expertise in economic affairs led to his appointment as the chief of economic affairs at the permanent mission to the European Communities in Brussels, Belgium, from 1998 to 2002. On 1 March 2002, Andradjati was appointed as the director for commodity and standardization within the foreign ministry. In 2004, Andradjati took on the role as the deputy chief of mission at the embassy in Singapore. During his posting in Singapore, he spent most of his time at Changi Airport to facilitate visits from Indonesian government officials. Following the departure of ambassador Slamet Hidayat in 2006, Andradjati became the embassy's chargé d'affaires ad interim. He served as deputy chief of mission until May 2007.

From Singapore, Andradjati became Indonesia's consul general in Cape Town, South Africa, on 11 May 2007. He oversaw the 2009 Indonesian general elections held within his jurisdiction, with the ruling Democratic Party winning by a significant margin. He was replaced in December 2009 and was recalled to serve as the Africa director within the foreign ministry. As director, Andradjati advocated for a clear policy or blueprint for its relationship with Africa to allow it compete economically with nations like Vietnam and India, rather than comparing themselves solely to China.

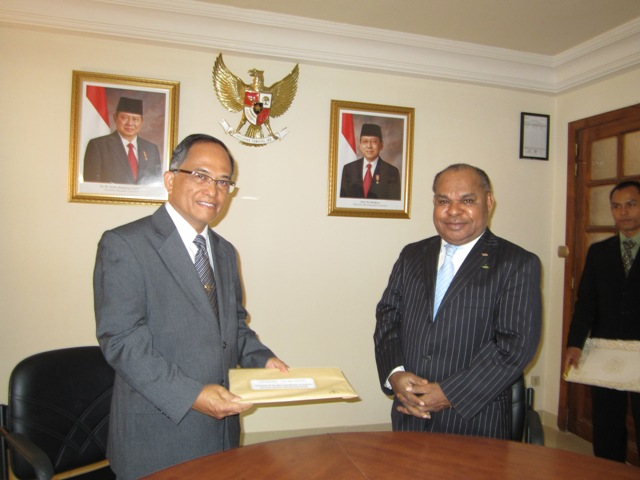
Andradjati receiving his duties from chargé d'affaires ad interim Royyen Wanimbo.

On 21 December 2011, Andradjati was sworn in as ambassador to Senegal, with concurrent accreditation to Ivory Coast, The Gambia, Guinea-Bissau, Gabon, Democratic Republic of the Congo, Guinea, Mali, and Sierra Leone by President Susilo Bambang Yudhoyono. He had previously undergone an assessment process by the House of Representatives on 24 August and was approved on 12 September.

He arrived on 25 January 2012 and received his duties five days later from chargé d'affaires ad interim Royyen Wanimbo. He presented his credentials to the president of Senegal Macky Sall on 23 May 2012, president of The Gambia Yahya Jammeh on 19 July 2012, president of Sierra Leone Ernest Bai Koroma on 27 July 2012, president of Gabon Ali Bongo on 10 August 2012, to the president of Guinea Alpha Condé on 29 August 2012, to the president of the Democratic Republic of the Congo Joseph Kabila on 9 May 2013, and to the president of Mali Ibrahim Boubacar Keïta on 16 January 2014.

During his first two years as an ambassador, Andradjati received statement of interest from Indonesian companies wanting to market their product in the embassy's accredited countries. Andradjati also assisted the Indonesian Aerospace company in marketing CASA/IPTN CN-235 through brochures and magazines. He later stated that Senegal had difficulties in purchasing the aeroplane due to their lack of diplomatic presence in Indonesia, and had to conduct the purchase through Belgium as its guarantor. He announced his departure to Ali Bongo in November 2015 and to the vice president of Gambia Isatou Njie-Saidy in December.

== Later life ==
After his retirement from diplomatic service, Andradjati joined the Perindo Party and became the party's advisor from 2017 to 2018. In the 2019 Indonesian general election, he ran as the party's candidate for the House of Representatives from the Jakarta III electoral district, but was not elected.

== Personal life ==
Andradjati is married to Nidalia Djohansyah Makki and has six children.
