= Dian Triansyah Djani =

Indonesian politician

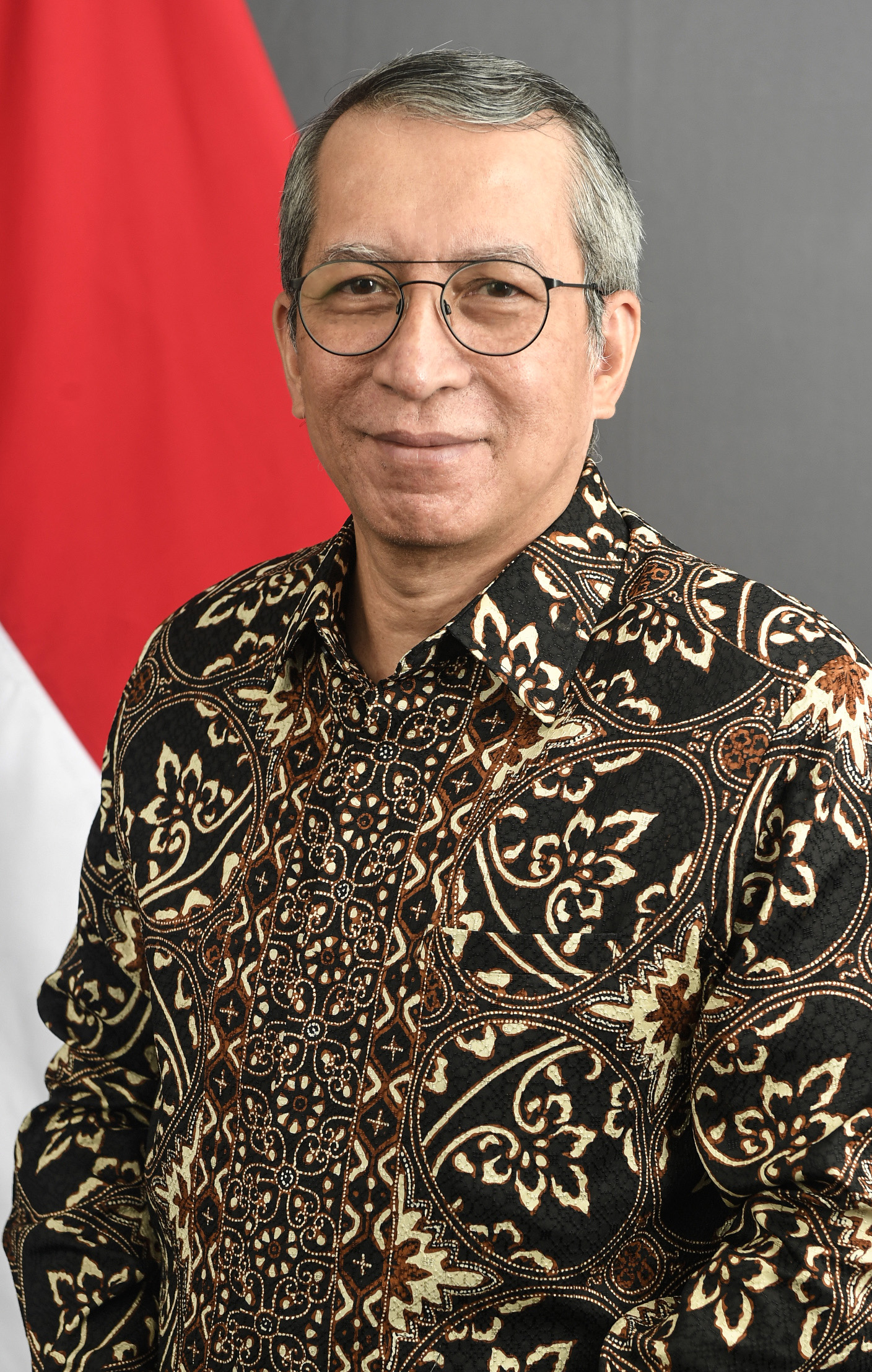

President of the United Nations Security Council
- In office 1 August 2020 – 31 August 2020
- Secretary-General: António Guterres
- Preceded by: Christoph Heusgen
- Succeeded by: Abdou Abarry
- In office 1 May 2019 – 31 May 2019 Serving with Retno Marsudi
- Secretary-General: António Guterres
- Preceded by: Christoph Heusgen
- Succeeded by: Mansour Al-Otaibi

Permanent Representative of Indonesia to the United Nations
- In office 12 April 2016 – 2 February 2021
- President: Joko Widodo
- Preceded by: Desra Percaya
- Succeeded by: Arrmanatha Nasir

Director General of America and Europe
- In office 12 April 2012 – 23 May 2016
- Preceded by: Retno Marsudi
- Succeeded by: Muhammad Anshor

Permanent Representative of Indonesia to the United Nations and Other International Organizations in Geneva
- In office 30 January 2009 – 2012
- President: Susilo Bambang Yudhoyono
- Preceded by: Makarim Wibisono
- Succeeded by: Triyono Wibowo

Director General of ASEAN
- In office 28 December 2005 – 3 November 2008; Acting until 20 October 2006
- Preceded by: Marty Natalegawa
- Succeeded by: Djauhari Oratmangun

Personal details
- Born: July 9, 1962 (age 64) Jakarta, Indonesia
- Spouse: Lista Damayanti Djani
- Children: 1
- Education: University of Indonesia; Vanderbilt University; Padjadjaran University

Dian Triansyah Djani (born 9 July 1962) is an Indonesian diplomat currently serving as the special advisor to the foreign minister for priority programs. He was Permanent representative to the United Nations (UN) in New York from 2016 to 2021 and in Geneva from 2009 to 2012, with a tenure as director general of America and Europe from 2012 to 2016 and ASEAN from 2005 to 2009. Djani specialized in international trade, development, and regional cooperation.

== Early life and education ==
Djani was born in Jakarta, Indonesia, on 9 July 1962. He was educated at various schools abroad, attending elementary school at SD Tebet Timur Dalam in Jakarta before moving to the Indonesian Embassy School in Phnom Penh, Cambodia, where he completed his primary education in 1973. He continued his secondary schooling abroad, attending junior high school at the Indonesian Embassy in Bangkok and later in Moscow. He began high school at the Indonesian Embassy School in Moscow before returning to Jakarta to graduate from State Senior High School VI in 1980.

Djani pursued higher education in economics, obtaining a bachelor's degree with a major in development studies and international trade from the Faculty of Economics at the University of Indonesia in 1986. He furthered his studies in the United States, earning a Master of Arts in economic development and international trade from the Graduate Program at Vanderbilt University in 1990.

== Diplomatic career ==
Djani joined the diplomatic service in 1985 through a direct recruitment program. He completed his junior diplomatic education in 1986 and began his career as a staff member in the Directorate General of Foreign Economic Relations in 1987 and later as the acting head of the monetary and finance section. His first overseas posting was to the Permanent Mission of the Republic of Indonesia to the United Nations in New York, where he served as third and later second secretary for economic affairs from 1991 to 1994. During this time, he was a delegate to the UN General Assembly and the Economic and Social Council (ECOSOC), and served as a negotiator for the Group of 77 (G-77) on financial resource flows.

Upon returning to Jakarta in 1994, Djani was appointed head of the section for sub-regional economic cooperation. He completed his mid-level diplomatic education in 1977 and returned to overseas service on the same year as first secretary and later counsellor at the Permanent Mission of Indonesia in Geneva. His tenure in Geneva, which lasted until 2001, was heavily focused on the World Trade Organization; he acted as the ASEAN coordinator for investment negotiations and represented Indonesia on issues regarding government procurement, competition policy, and dispute settlement. Following this posting, he held several directorships in Jakarta, including head of the sub-directorate for energy, director of multilateral trade and industry, and director of intra-regional cooperation for Asia Pacific and Africa.

Djani completed his senior diplomatic education in 2003. By 2005, he became the director of ASEAN economic cooperation and subsequently served as the director general of ASEAN cooperation from October 2006 to January 2009. During this period, he was a key figure in the evolution of the organization, serving as a negotiator and head of the Indonesian delegation on the High Level Task Force on the Drafting of the ASEAN Charter. He also led Indonesian delegations for numerous ASEAN dialogue partnerships, including meetings with Canada, the United States, China, India, and the European Union, and served as the chairman of the ASEAN Standing Committee.

In March 2009, Djani was appointed as the ambassador and permanent representative of Indonesia to the United Nations, WTO, and other international organizations in Geneva. During his three-year tenure, he held several high-profile leadership positions within the international community. He served as the vice president of the UN Human Rights Council in 2009 and the president of the UNCTAD Trade and Development Board that same year. In 2012, he became the chairman of the G-77 and China at UNCTAD. His work in Geneva also encompassed disarmament and humanitarian issues; he co-chaired the Standing Committee on Stockpile Destruction for the Mine Ban Convention and led delegations to the Conference on Disarmament and the Biological Weapons Convention.

Following his ambassadorship in Geneva, Djani returned to Jakarta in April 2012 to assume the post of director general of American and European affairs. Beyond his official diplomatic duties, he is the founder of the WTO Forum Indonesia and the author of the book Sekilas WTO. He frequently serves as a guest lecturer at universities in Indonesia and abroad.

He has served in various capacities, especially during Indonesia's reign as G20 President and ASEAN Chairman (2021–2023). After returning from New York as the Indonesian Ambassador to the UN, he as well concurrently serve as the Co-Sherpa for the Indonesian G20 Presidency. He was the Chairman of the United Nations General Assembly Second Committee at the 71st United Nations General Assembly, from September 2016 to September 2017. He was also appointed to be Vice President of the 72nd UN General Assembly in 2017–2018, and 74th UN General Assembly in 2019–2020. In May 2019 and August 2020, he took the seat of Presidency of the United Nations Security Council.

== Awards ==
For his service, he has been awarded the Satya Lencana Karya Satya for 10 and 20 years of service, as well as the Kesatria Bhakti Husada Aditya in 2011.

== Personal life ==
He is married to Lista Damayanti Djani, and they have one son, Panji Caraka Djani.
