= Makmur =

Makmur could refer to:

- Kue makmur, traditional Malay cake
- Makmur Widodo (born 1945), Indonesian diplomat and journalist
