= Djumantoro Purbo =

Indonesian diplomat (born 1955)

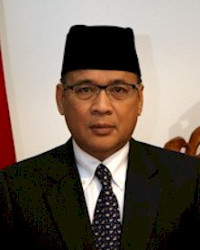

Indonesian Ambassador to Slovakia
- In office 14 November 2012 – January 2017
- President: Susilo Bambang Yudhoyono; Joko Widodo
- Preceded by: Harsha Edwana Joesoef
- Succeeded by: Wieke Adiwoso

Personal details
- Born: July 8, 1955 (age 71) Bandung, Indonesia
- Spouse: Pudji Wahyuni
- Relations: Djumhana Wiriaatmadja (grandfather)
- Children: 2
- Parents: Purbo Sugiarto Suwondo (father); Suhaeti Fatimah (mother)
- Education: St. John's University (MA)

Djumantoro Purbo (born 8 July 1955) is an Indonesian career diplomat who served as the ambassador to Slovakia from 2012 to 2017. He has held various positions within the foreign ministry and abroad, including as the deputy director for Southeast Asia and deputy chief of mission of the embassy in Bangkok, Thailand. He had also served outside the diplomatic service as the director of human rights information system within the department of law and human rights between 2003 to 2007.

== Early life and education ==
Djumantoro was born in Bandung on 8 July 1955 as the eldest child of Purbo Sugiarto Suwondo, an Indonesian National Revolution veteran who retired with the rank of lieutenant general, and Suhaeti Fatimah. Purbo held a number of roles within the government, including a three-year diplomatic stint as the deputy permanent representative of Indonesia to the United Nations (an ambassador-level position) from 1978 to 1981. His grandfather from her mother's side, Djumhana Wiriaatmadja, was the former prime minister of the Dutch puppet state of Pasundan and held several ambassadorships following the Indonesian National Revolution. Djumantoro received his master's degree in government and politics as well as a graduate certificate in international law and diplomacy from St. John's University in 1983.

== Diplomatic career ==
Djumantoro's diplomatic service started in 1984. A year after, he was entrusted as the co-officer in charge of the decolonization affairs, before being reassigned to the East Timor desk, where he served until 1988. He was sent to the permanent mission to the UN in Geneva, where he began his internship with the rank of attaché. While serving in Geneva, Djumantoro attended a brief fellowship on disarmament by the United Nations for mid-level diplomats from developing countries in 1991, after which he received the Mayoral Award for Honorary Nagasaki Citizen for Peace and Disarmament. He was later promoted to the diplomatic rank of third secretary, where he was a junior officer in charge of human rights, international security, and disarmament. From 1992 to 1995, Djumantoro was recalled to the foreign ministry as the officer-in-charge for United Nations Security Council affairs.

By this time, Djumantoro had reached the diplomatic rank of first secretary. He was then posted to another permanent mission to the United Nations, this time being in New York, where he was put in charge of international security and disarmament from 1996 to 1999. Upon returning to Jakarta, Djumantoro was appointed as the deputy director for Southeast Asian affairs within the foreign ministry from 2000 to 2003.

Between 2003 and 2007, Djumantoro was seconded to the ministry of law and human rights as the ministry's director of human rights information. Djumantoro, alongside with several regional government officials in Aceh, pushed forward the formation of a truth and reconciliation council to resolve human rights violation during the insurgency in Aceh. Djumantoro was then sent to Bangkok, where he became the second-in-command in the embassy, acting as the deputy chief of mission, double hatted as the deputy permanent representative to the Bangkok-based UNESCAP. He briefly became the embassy's chargés d'affaires ad interim following the departure of ambassador Ibrahim Yusuf on 30 April 2008. During his provisional leadership of the embassy, the embassy received a gold medal from the Bangkok municipal authority for garden aesthetic and cleanliness.

In September 2009, Djumantoro was named as a suspect in a financial embezzlement case within the embassy. Djumantoro was implicated, alongside with ambassador Mohammad Hatta and embassy's treasurer Suhaeni, for reallocating financial surpluses from the embassy's 2008 budget into the ambassador's slush funds without the knowledge of the financial ministry. Suhaeni initially rejected, but she was ultimately powerless against the ambassador. Djumantoro and Hatta shifted the blame to each other, with Djumantoro claiming that he was only obeying orders from the ambassadors, emphasizing that he never used the slush funds, while Hatta stated that Djumantoro was responsible for financial matters within the embassy. Djumantoro was investigated by the prosecution on 4 November 2009 and the misappropriated slush funds were later returned. Under the instruction of Marwan Effendy, the junior attorney general for special crimes, the case was later closed in March 2010 due to a "lack of evidence" and the entire case being a mere "administrative error". Emerson Yuntho of the Indonesia Corruption Watch accused the prosecution of "favoritism" due to Djumantoro's ties with the father of the-then first lady, Sarwo Edhie Wibowo. After the case went public, both Djumantoro and Hatta lost their position and Djumantoro was reassigned to the directorate general of Asia and Pacific as a senior advisor without any specific portofolio. He then attended a senior executive course at the Asia-Pacific Center for Security Studies in 2011.

Djumantoro's appointment as ambassador to Slovakia marked his legal rehabilitation, with him being sworn in 14 November 2012. He presented his credentials to president Ivan Gašparovič on 14 January 2013. During his tenure, Djumantoro embarked on promoting Indonesia through culinary, with him personally holding cooking demonstrations for the local populace. Djumantoro promoted barter compensation trade, especially within the framework of food security and self-sustainability, and sought to increase people-to-people contacts between Indonesia and Slovakia through student exchanges, internships, and business contacts. Djumantoro's term end in late January 2017. He later became a senior instructor on Indonesia's coffee diplomacy efforts to diplomatic education students.

== Personal life ==
Djumantoro is married to Pudji Wahyuni and has a son and a daughter. His hobbies include gardening, cycling, and reading.
