= Susanto Sutoyo =

Indonesian diplomat (born 1947)

Ambassador of Indonesia to Italy
- In office 29 March 2005 – October 2008
- President: Susilo Bambang Yudhoyono
- Preceded by: Freddy Numberi
- Succeeded by: Yuwono Agus Putranto (acting); August Parengkuan

Director General of Multilateral Economic, Financial, and Development Affairs
- In office 3 May 2002 – 29 March 2005
- Minister: Hassan Wirajuda
- Preceded by: Mochamad Slamet Hidayat (as Director of Multilateral Economic Cooperation)
- Succeeded by: Mochamad Slamet Hidayat (Multilateral Affairs)

Ambassador of Indonesia to New Zealand
- In office 21 May 2001 – 3 May 2002
- President: Abdurrahman Wahid; Megawati Sukarnoputri
- Preceded by: Titiek Suharti Rustaman
- Succeeded by: Primo Alui Joelianto

Personal details
- Born: July 4, 1947 (age 79) Kendal, Central Java, Indonesia
- Spouse: Endang H. Sutoyo
- Children: 3
- Education: Diponegoro University (Drs.)

Susanto Sutoyo (born 4 July 1947) is an Indonesian diplomat who served as ambassador to New Zealand from 2001 to 2002 and to Italy from 2005 to 2009. Between his ambassadorial terms, Susanto was the inaugural director general of the second multilateral directorate general, with responsibilities on economic, financial, and development affairs.

== Early life, education, and personal life ==
Susanto was born on 4 July 1947 in Kendal, a locality within the Central Java province. He studied at the social and political faculty of the Diponegoro University, during which he was active within the student senate and became one of its chair. He graduated in 1974 and immediately began working in the foreign ministry a year later.

Susanto is married to Endang H. Sutoyo and has three children.

== Diplomatic career ==
Beginning his career in the directorate of information and cultural relations, Susanto worked as a junior staff for a year before being promoted as head of the Asia-Pacific section in the directorate. In 1979, he received his maiden overseas assignment at the embassy in Addis Ababa, Ethiopia, being in charge of information affairs with the rank of attaché. He then became a permanent staff following his promotion to the diplomatic rank of third secretary and served until 1982. During Indonesia's 1982 election, Susanto was part of the embassy's overseas election committee.

Susanto returned to Indonesia in 1983 to take up office as the head of section for GATT Trade Cooperation within the directorate of multilateral economic cooperation. During the course of his career, he represented Indonesia in various UNCTAD committees' meetings in Geneva and ESCAP Committees' meetings in Bangkok. After a three-year stint as the head of section, Susanto was then appointed to the permanent mission in Geneva, beginning with the rank of second secretary. He rose through the rank, and by the end of his tenure there he reached the diplomatic rank of counsellor and as the chief of economic affairs in the permanent mission. Throughout his service in Geneva, Susanto represented Indonesia in General Agreement on Tariffs and Trade negotiation rounds in Geneva and Brussels.

From Geneva, Susanto was appointed as deputy director for trade, finance, and development cooperation within the directorate of multilateral economic cooperation, serving from 1991 to 1993. Susanto was active in various international meetings and conferences, including at the World Conference on Human Rights in 1993, World Summit for Social Development and the World Conference on Women in 1995. In 1992, Susanto was appointed as the member of the National Committee for the 10th Summit of the Non-Aligned Countries.

After his tenure in the directorate, Susanto became the chief of economic affairs at the permanent mission in New York with the rank of counsellor in 1993. He was promoted to minister counsellor shortly later. Susanto took part in United Nations General Assembly sessions during his assignment, where he was seated in the third commission and participated in United Nations Economic and Social Council meetings. Susanto was elected as chairman of the UN Commission on Social Development at its 34th session in April 1995.

In 1995, Susanto was recalled to serve as the chief of economics cooperation bureau within Indonesia's ASEAN national secretariat. Outside of ASEAN related summits and conferences, he also represented Indonesia in Asia-Europe Meetings (ASEM). In February 1999, Susanto returned to Geneva for an appointment as the deputy permanent representative in the permanent mission. He represented Indonesia in the United Nations Commission on Human Rights, International Labour Organization, the 13th Ministerial Meeting of the Non-Aligned Movement in Cartagena in April 2000, and the 54th session of the United Nations General Assembly Special Session of the Review on the Copenhagen+5 in Geneva in June 2000.

Susanto was sworn in as ambassador to New Zealand on 21 May 2001 and presented his credentials to Governor-General Silvia Cartwright on 5 July 2001. During his tenure, president Abdurrahman Wahid visited the country a week after Susanto's own arrival in June. Susanto projected a normalization of diplomatic relations, as he ensured issues barring the relations was gone, and aimed to increase the volume of business from New Zealand in Indonesia as well as people-to-people exchanges. He also oversaw the opening of Indonesia's embassy in Fiji. Although his term was supposed to end in 2004, in 2002 he was recalled to Jakarta in light of organizational restructuring within the foreign ministry. He was appointed to lead the newly established directorate general of multilateral economic, financial, and development affairs and was sworn in on 3 May 2002. He played a key role as Indonesia's chief negotiator during the World Trade Organization Ministerial Conference of 2003.

On 29 March 2005, Susanto was installed as Indonesia's ambassador to Italy, with concurrent accreditation to Cyprus, Malta, the Food and Agriculture Organization, World Food Programme, and the International Fund for Agricultural Development. Susanto presented his credentials to president Carlo Azeglio Ciampi of Italy on 28 June 2005, Director General of the Food and Agriculture Organization Jacques Diouf on 20 July 2005, president Tassos Papadopoulos of Cyprus on 30 September 2005, and president Eddie Fenech Adami of Malta on 27 October 2005. As ambassador, Susanto was an ex-officio alternate governor of the International Fund for Agricultural Development. Susanto departed his post in October 2008 and was replaced by his deputy chief of mission, Yuwono Agus Putranto, who acted as chargé d'affaires ad interim. In December 2009, Susanto became the senior adviser to coordinating minister for people's welfare Agung Laksono for international relations. At the end of his term, Susanto received an award from the coordinating ministry as a principal associate.
