= Nadjib Riphat Kesoema =

Indonesian diplomat (born 1953)

Nadjib Riphat DSG
- Riphat in 2010

22nd Ambassador of Indonesia to Australia
- In office October 2012 – 2017
- President: Susilo Bambang Yudhoyono; Joko Widodo
- Preceded by: Primo Alui Joelianto
- Succeeded by: Kristiarto Legowo

Deputy Coordinating Minister for Political, Legal and Security Affairs
- In office 2010–2012
- President: Susilo Bambang Yudhoyono
- Minister: Djoko Suyanto
- Preceded by: Albert Matondang
- Succeeded by: Antonius Agus Sriyono

19th Ambassador of Indonesia to Belgium
- In office 2006–2010
- President: Susilo Bambang Yudhoyono
- Preceded by: Sulaiman Abdul Manan
- Succeeded by: Arif Havas Oegroseno

Personal details
- Born: 23 March 1953 (age 73) Medan, Indonesia
- Party: Independent
- Spouse: Nino Nasution Riphat
- Children: Nindia Riphat; Nisa Riphat
- Education: Padjadjaran University

Nadjib Riphat Kesoema DSG (born 23 March 1953) is an Indonesian diplomat and was Ambassador to Australia and Vanuatu until 2017. He has been awarded four cultural awards from Belgium including Chevalier d'honorarium (knight) from the Haute Confrerie Royal du Noble Corcieli of the city of Oostende as well as the Order of St. Gregory the Great – The Holy See by Pope John Paul II.

He was Deputy Minister of the Coordinating Minister for Political, Legal and Security Affairs from 2011 to 2012 and also Ambassador to the European Union, Belgium and Luxembourg from 2006 to 2010. He is the first Ambassador to Belgium with the accreditation to both European Union and the Grand Duchy of Luxembourg.

In 2013, following the allegations of mobile phone tapping by the Australian government on Indonesian's high-ranking officials in the Australia–Indonesia spying scandal, Nadjib was recalled immediately as a sign of protest by the Indonesian Government. Australian Prime Minister Tony Abbott initially declined to apologise or comment on the matter, prompting accusations from President Susilo Bambang Yudhoyono that he had "belittled" Indonesia's response to the issue.

== Early life ==
Born in Medan on 23 March 1953, Nadjb studied psychology at the Padjadjaran University. He earned a baccalaureate (sarjana muda, lit. 'young bachelor', equivalent to an associate degree in the Western higher education system) in 1977 and completed his bachelor's degree in psychology in 1980, specializing in social psychology with a focus on political psychology.

== Career ==
After receiving his baccalaureate, Nadjib taught at his almamater, Padjadjaran University, as well as the Bandung Islamic University and the Bandung Nursing Academy from 1978 to 1981. He joined the foreign ministry in 1981 as a staff at the directorate of foreign information. He completed basic diplomatic training in 1983 and was appointed chief of the ministry's press release section in 1984. His first overseas diplomatic posting was in 1985 at the information and socio-cultural affairs section of the embassy in Oslo, Norway, with the rank of attaché and later Third Secretary.

Upon returning to Indonesia, he was appointed chief of educational assignment section within the foreign ministry's education and training center in 1989. He completed mid-level diplomatic training in 1990. By 1992, Nadjib was assigned to the political and information section of the embassy in Holy See with the rank of second secretary, and later first secretary. He was awarded the Civil Servants' Long Service Medal, 3rd Class, in 1993 and the Order of St. George the Great II from the Holy See in 1996.

Following his service at the Vatican, Nadjib returned to Jakarta in 1996 to serve as the chief of information and administration department of the foreign ministry's secretariat general. During this period, he undertook senior diplomatic education in 1997 and a mid-level and senior course for administrative officers in 1998. In 1999, he was posted to the political section of the embassy in Canberra with the rank of counsellor, and later minister counsellor, before returning to the foreign ministry as the chief of education and training center. As the center's chief, he joined the International Forum of Deans and Directors of Diplomatic Academies and, from 2004 to 2005, was the chairman of the Association of Directors of Diplomatic Training Institutions of ASEAN+PRC, Japan, and ROK. He was awarded the Civil Servants' Long Service Medal, 2nd Class, in 2002.

After serving various positions, he was the first Ambassador Extraordinary and Plenipotentiary to both the Kingdom of Belgium, and to the European Union; Deputy Minister of the Ministry of Political, Legal and Security Affairs; and finally as Ambassador Extraordinary and Plenipotentiary to Australia.

Since 2021 the Ambassador holds the position of National Chairman of The Duke of Edinburgh's International Award Indonesia.

== Honours ==
Chevalier d'honorarium (knight) from the Haute Confrerie Royal du Noble Corcieli of the city of Oostende, 2009. Order de l’Honneur des Amis de Manneken Pis, 2008 for his contribution in the cultural relationship between Indonesia and Belgium Order of St. Gregory the Great, 1994 from Pope John Paul II. People's Award from the British government, 2024
