= Lambertus Nicodemus Palar =

Indonesian diplomat and politician

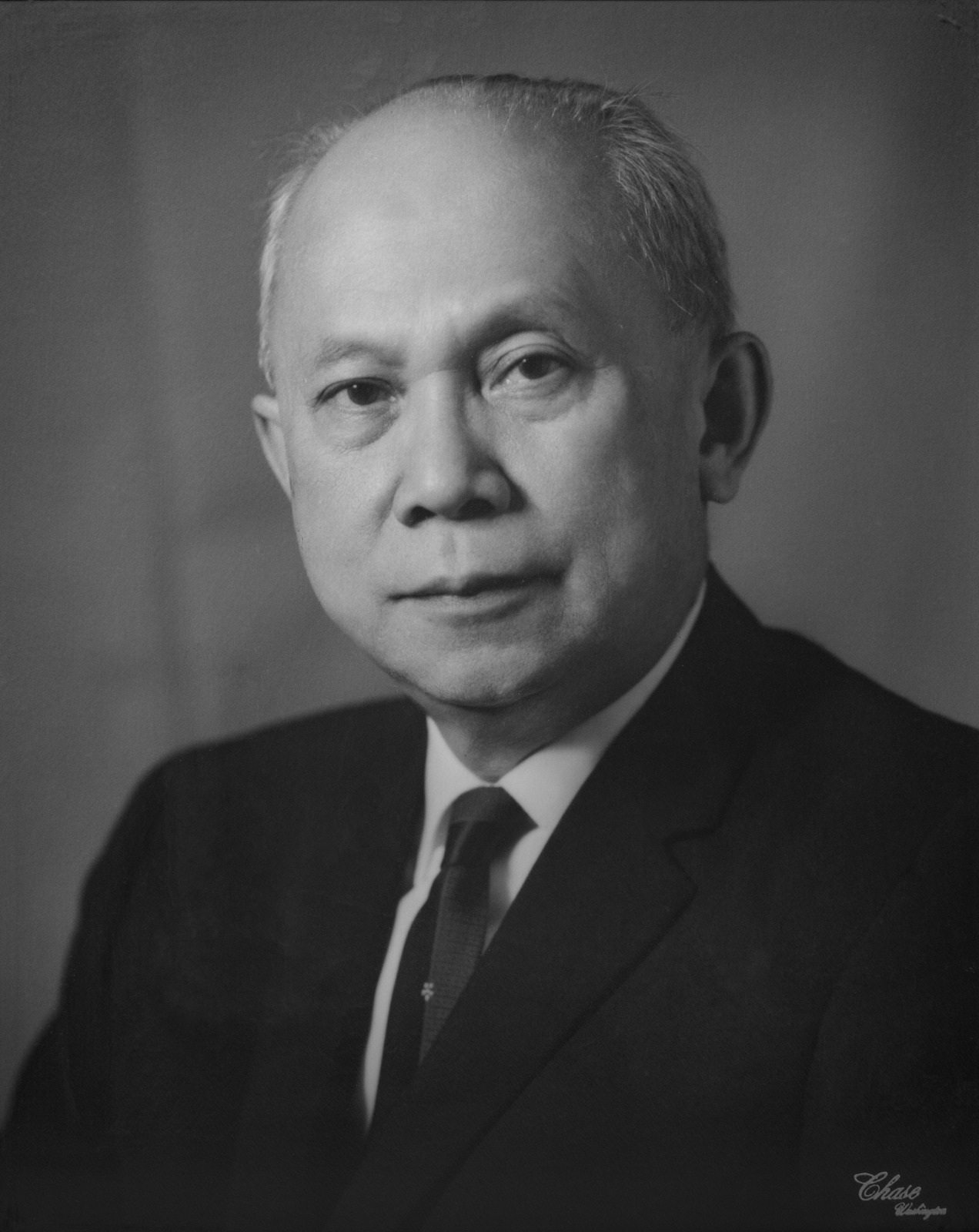
- Official portrait, c. 1966

1st Representative of Indonesia to the United Nations
- In office 1950–1953
- Succeeded by: Sudjarwo Tjondronegoro
- In office 1962–1965
- Preceded by: Soekardjo Wirjopranoto
- Succeeded by: Roeslan Abdulgani

4th Indonesian Ambassador to the United States
- In office 5 May 1965 – 6 April 1966
- Preceded by: Zairin Zain
- Succeeded by: Suwito Kusumowidagdo

Personal details
- Born: 5 June 1900 Tomohon, North Sulawesi, Dutch East Indies
- Died: 13 February 1981 (aged 80) Jakarta, Indonesia
- Spouse: Johanna Petronella Volmers

Lambertus Nicodemus Palar (5 June 1900 – 13 February 1981), also known as Babe Palar, was an Indonesian diplomat and politician who represented the Republic of Indonesia in various diplomatic positions most notably as the first Indonesian representative to the United Nations. He also held ambassadorships in India, West Germany, the Soviet Union, Canada, and the United States. He also briefly served in the Dutch House of Representatives. He was the son of Gerrit Palar and Jacoba Lumanauw.

== Early life and education ==
Palar attended middle school (Dutch: Meer Uitgebreid Lager Onderwijs (MULO)) in Tondano. He moved to Java to attend high school (Dutch: Algeme(e)ne Middelbare School (AMS)) in Yogyakarta where he stayed with Sam Ratulangi. In 1922, Palar started his studies at the Technical University (Dutch: Technische Hoogeschool) in Bandung, which is now known as the Bandung Institute of Technology (Indonesian: Institut Teknologi Bandung (ITB)). At this school, Palar became acquainted with Indonesian nationalists such as Sukarno. A severe illness forced Palar to drop out of the school and to return to Minahasa. Palar eventually restarted his studies at faculty of law (Dutch: Rechts Hoogeschool) in Batavia (now Jakarta) where he joined the youth organization called Young Minahasa (Indonesian: Jong Minahasa). In 1928, Palar moved to the Netherlands.

== Political career ==
In 1930, Palar became a member of the Social Democratic Workers' Party (Dutch: Sociaal-Democratische Arbeiders Partij (SDAP)) shortly after the SDAP convened a Colonial Congress and voted on propositions that included unconditionally recognizing the right of national independence for the Dutch Indies. Palar then held the position of secretary of the Colonial Commission of the SDAP and the Netherlands' Trade Union Federation (Dutch: Nederlands Verbond van Vakverenigingen (NVV)) starting in October 1933. He was also the director of Persbureau Indonesia (Persindo), which was given the task of sending articles related to Dutch social democracy to the Dutch Indies. In 1938, Palar returned to his homeland with his wife, Johanna Petronella Volmers, whom he married in 1935. He traveled throughout the archipelago and gathered information on the current developments. He discovered that the Indonesian nationalist movement was very much alive and returned to the Netherlands writing about his experience.

During the German occupation of the Netherlands, Palar could not work for the SDAP and instead was employed in the Van der Waals Laboratorium. He also taught Malay language classes and was a guitarist in a Kroncong ensemble. During the war, Palar and his wife joined the anti-Nazi underground movement.

After the war, Palar was voted into the Lower House (Dutch: Tweede Kamer) representing the newly established Labour Party (Dutch: Partij van de Arbeid (PvdA)), which originated from the SDAP. After the Indonesian Declaration of Independence on 17 August 1945, Palar being sympathetic to the proclamation promoted contacts with the Indonesian nationalists. This was not received well by the PvdA resulting in the party distancing itself from the original position of unconditionally recognizing the right of national independence for Indonesia, which was opposed by Palar. Being assigned by his party on a fact finding mission to Indonesia, Palar again met with the leaders of the Indonesian National Revolution including President Sukarno. Palar continued to urge non-violent resolution of the dispute between the Netherlands and the new Republic of Indonesia. However, on 20 July 1947, the parliament voted to commence politionele acties (English: police actions) in Indonesia. Palar resigned from the parliament and the Labor Party the following day.

== Representing Indonesia ==
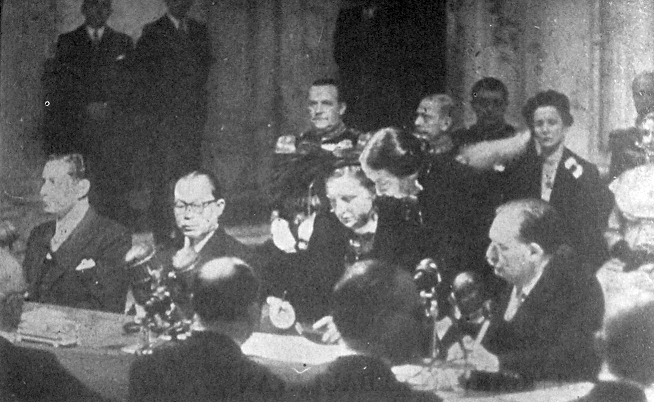
Indonesian Vice-president Hatta and Dutch Juliana of the Netherlands at the signing ceremony in The Hague at which the Dutch recognized Indonesian sovereignty

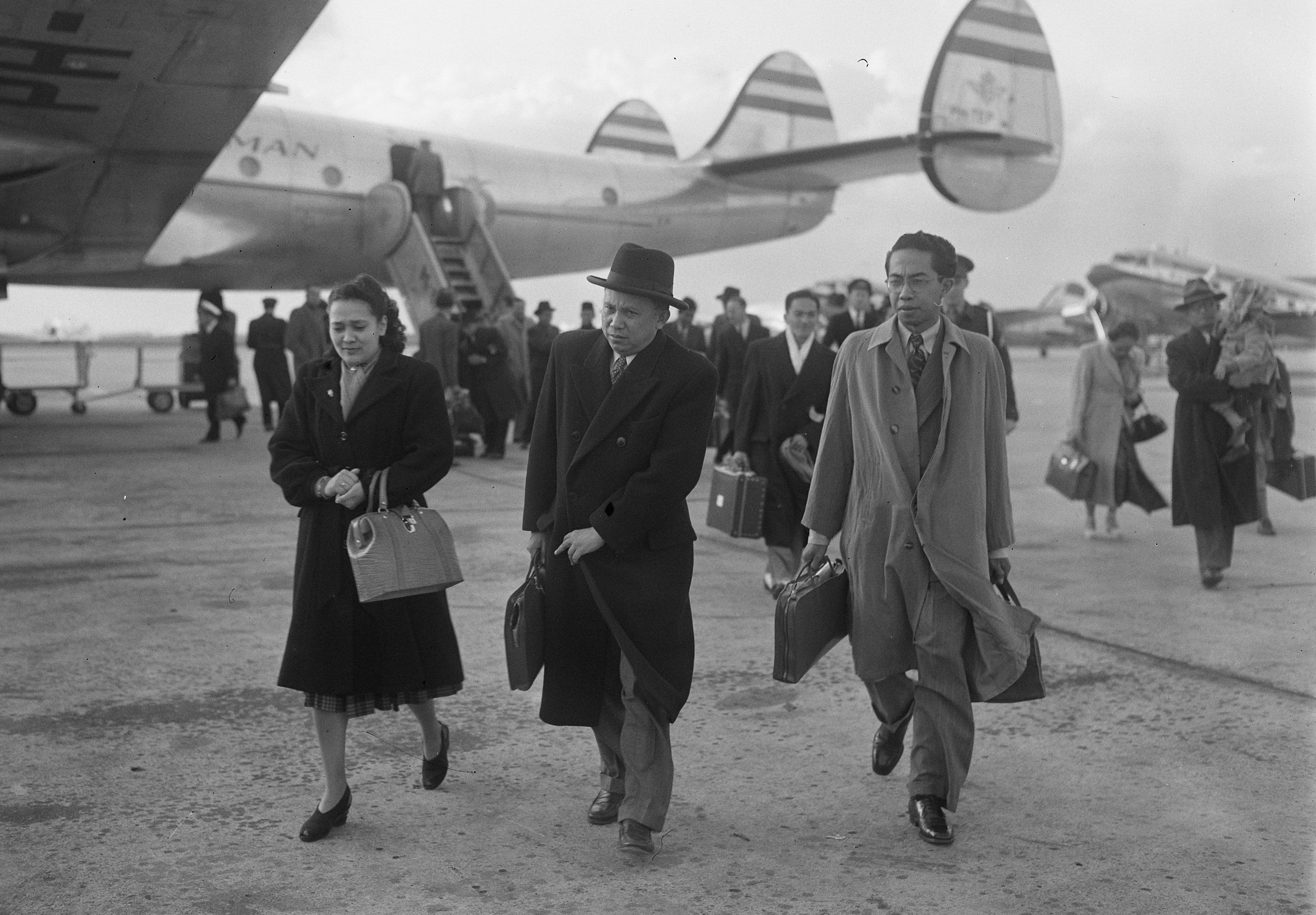
Palar in the Netherlands, 1950

Palar joined the effort for international recognition of Indonesian independence by becoming the Indonesian Representative to the United Nations in 1947. He remained in this position until 1953. This time period included such important events as the continued Dutch-Indonesian conflict, the transfer of sovereignty from the Dutch, and the inclusion of Indonesia as a member of the United Nations.

During the Dutch-Indonesian conflict, Palar argued the case of Indonesian independence at the UN and the Security Council, even though his status was only as an "observer" because Indonesia was not a member of the UN at the time. After a second politionele actie was unpopular and subsequently condemned by the Security Council, the Roem–Van Roijen Agreement was signed, which led to the Dutch-Indonesian Round Table Conference and the recognition of Indonesian sovereignty by the Dutch on 27 December 1949.

Indonesia was admitted as the 60th member state of the United Nations on 28 September 1950. Addressing the General Assembly as the first Indonesian ambassador to the United Nations, Palar thanked those that supported the Indonesian cause and pledged that Indonesia would assume the responsibilities of being a member state. Palar continued his work at the UN until being assigned the Indonesian ambassadorship for India. In 1955, Palar was called back to Indonesia and was instrumental in planning the Asia-Africa Conference, which gathered Asian and African states, most of which were newly independent. After the conference, Palar resumed his ambassadorial responsibilities by representing Indonesia in East Germany and the Soviet Union.

From 1957 to 1962, he became the ambassador to Canada and afterwards returned to the UN as Ambassador until 1965. Sukarno withdrew Indonesia's membership in the UN because of the Indonesia–Malaysia confrontation and upon the election of Malaysia to the Security Council. Palar then became the ambassador to the United States. Under new leadership of Suharto in 1966, Indonesia requested the resumption of membership in the UN with a message to the Secretary General that was delivered by Palar.

== Retirement and death ==
Palar retired from foreign service in 1968 having served his country during its early struggles and conflicts and battled for its freedom in the diplomatic arena. Palar returned to Jakarta, but remained active through lectureships, social work, and as an advisor to the Indonesian Representative to the United Nations.

Lambertus Nicodemus Palar died in Jakarta on 13 February 1981. He was survived by his wife, Johanna Petronella "Yoke" Volmers, and children Maria Elisabeth Singh, Maesi Martowardojo, and Bintoar Palar.

In November 2013 Palar, together with Rajiman Wediodiningrat and T. B. Simatupang, was declared a National Hero of Indonesia.

== Bibliography ==
- Drooglever, P.; Schouten, M.; Lohanda, M. (1999). Guide to the Archives on Relations between the Netherlands and Indonesia 1945-1963. Institute of Netherlands History. ISBN 9052161100.
- Hansen, Erik (1977). "The Dutch East Indies and the Reorientation of Dutch Social Democracy, 1929-40". 23. Ithaca: Cornell Southeast Asia Program.
- Kahin, George (1981). "In Memoriam: L. N. Palar". 32. Ithaca: Cornell Southeast Asia Program.
- Parlina, Ina (9 November 2013). "Govt names three new national heroes". The Jakarta Post. Archived from the original on 11 November 2013.
- Saxon, Wolfgang (15 February 1981). "Lambertus N. Palar Dead at 80; Battled for Indonesia's Freedom". New York Times.
- Giebels, Lambert. "Biografie van Palar, Lambertus Nicodemus".
- Schwidder, Emile (1998). "Lambertus Nicodemus Palar".
- "History of the Indonesian Mission to the United Nations" (in Indonesian). Indonesian Mission to the United Nations. Archived from the original on 9 October 2006.
