= Sudjarwo Tjondronegoro =

Indonesian diplomat and politician

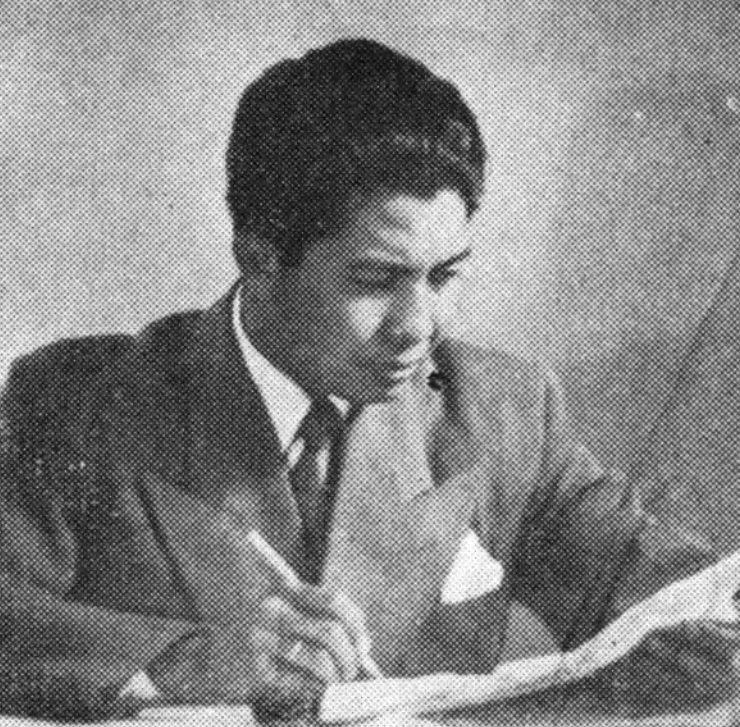
- Sudjarwo, c. 1953

2nd Representative of Indonesia to the United Nations
- In office 1953–1957
- Preceded by: Lambertus Nicodemus Palar
- Succeeded by: Ali Sastroamidjojo

Personal details
- Born: 2 March 1914 Lawang, East Java, Dutch East Indies
- Died: 8 December 1972 (aged 58) Jakarta, Indonesia

Sudjarwo Tjondronegoro (Enhanced Spelling: Sujarwo Condronegoro, 2 March 1914 – 8 December 1972) was an Indonesian journalist and diplomat. A graduate of Leiden University, he joined the nationalist movement while in the Netherlands and entered government service during the Indonesian National Revolution. He occupied several diplomatic roles, including as Indonesia's second Permanent Representative to the United Nations (1953–1957) and ambassador to the Netherlands (1965–1967). Sudjarwo was extensively involved in Indonesia's annexation of western New Guinea.

== Early life ==
Sudjarwo was born on 2 March 1914 in Lawang, East Java, Dutch East Indies. He attended Leiden University in the Netherlands, graduating in 1939. During his time as a student, Sudjarwo joined the nationalist movement, becoming a member of the Indonesia Moeda and Perhimpoenan Indonesia student associations. He was also active in journalism, doing reporting for Antara and heading a student-published monthly magazine.

Upon returning to Indonesia in 1940, Sudjarwo spent time working for the court system as well as the Governor of Central Java. During the Indonesian Revolution (1945–1949), he served as the chief of foreign information at the Ministry of Information. In 1950, he spent some time working for the Ministry of Information of the United States of Indonesia, again focusing mainly on the dissemination of information abroad.

== Diplomatic career ==
Sudjarwo joined the Ministry of Foreign Affairs later in 1950, and was appointed to the Indonesian consulate in London, the United Kingdom. Three years later, he was made the Permanent Representative of Indonesia to the United Nations, replacing Lambertus Nicodemus Palar after the latter was named the country's ambassador to India. In this capacity, Sudjarwo frequently delivered speeches regarding Indonesia's claim to western New Guinea. After the end of his term as Permanent Representative in 1957, Sudjarwo continued to work on advancing Indonesian control of western New Guinea. He attended the discussions that resulted in the New York Agreement between Indonesia and the Netherlands, and in 1963 he represented Indonesia in formally accepting control over the territory.

During Indonesia's clash with the newly established Malaysia, Sudjarwo represented the former in speeches to the United Nations Security Council in 1964. Regarding Indonesian attacks on Sarawak and Sabah, he stated that Indonesia felt justified in using violence against neighbouring states where disagreements existed. He acknowledged the attacks but described Malaysian opposition to them as "the present 'Malaysian' government feel[ing] unable to overcome its own internal troubles". Between 1965 and 1967, Sudjarwo served as Indonesia's ambassador to the Netherlands.

In 1968, Sudjarwo headed the eight-member Indonesian delegation that travelled with Fernando Ortiz-Sanz during the latter's tour of West New Guinea for the UN in the lead-up to the 1969 Act of Free Choice. He later represented Indonesia in voicing its rejection of Ortiz-Sanz's proposed mixed-methods approach to the referendum, and privately voiced concerns about the large number of anti-Indonesian petitions received. Ultimately, he helped coordinate the elected representative approach that was employed, to the point of agreeing to re-stage councillor elections so that the UN could better monitor them.

In the 1970s, Sudjarwo served as an advisor to the Ministry of Foreign Affairs as well as a member of the honorary council of the Indonesian Journalists Association. He served as the chairman of the Electoral Committee for Indonesians Abroad. He continued to write, publishing a series of articles on self-government in Indonesian West Irian in 1972. Sudjarwo and his wife had four children: Estina Adiarti, Nehria Astriani, Adi Tresnoto, and Bambang Anandoko.

== Death and legacy ==
Sudjarwo died on 8 December 1972 at Cipto Mangunkusumo Hospital in Jakarta after being admitted for a heart attack; according to his family, he had felt sudden chest pain while climbing stairs at the Ministry of Foreign Affairs three days earlier. The Indonesian government offered to bury Sudjarwo at Kalibata Heroes' Cemetery, but his family refused. He was instead interred at the Blok P Graveyard in Kebayoran Baru the following day. The funeral was attended by thousands, including Minister of Foreign Affairs Adam Malik, former Chief of Police Hoegeng Iman Santoso, and former Minister of Defense Abdul Haris Nasution. Speaking at the funeral, Malik described Sudjarwo as a top-class diplomat driven by a strong sense of humanity.

In 1973, the Indonesian government posthumously granted Soedjarwo the Star of Mahaputera, 5th class (Bintang Mahaputera Nararya). This was upgraded to a Star of Mahaputera, 3rd class (Bintang Mahaputera Utama), in 1989. A road in Manokwari in Papua is named after him, along with a now-disused airport in the Yapen Islands Regency.

== Works cited ==
- AZKA (10 December 1972). "Jenasah Sudjarwo Tjondronegoro SH Dimakamkan di Blok P. Kebayoran" [Body of Sudjarwo Tjondronegoro SH Interred at Blok P. Kebayoran]. Kompas (in Indonesian). Jakarta. pp. 1, 12.
- "Daftar Warganegara Republik Indonesia yang Mendapat Tanda Kehormatan Bintang Mahaputera Tahun 1959 s.d. 2003" [List of Citizens of the Republic of Indonesia who Received the Star of Mahaputera, 1959–2003] (PDF) (in Indonesian). State Secretariat of Indonesia. Archived from the original (PDF) on 27 November 2025.
- "From the Archives, 1963: Control of West New Guinea handed to Indonesia". Brisbane Times. Brisbane. 30 April 2023 – via ProQuest.
- Hamilton, Thomas J. (11 September 1964). "Stevenson Urges Malaysian Truce: Bids U.N. Tell Indonesia to End Attack and Negotiate". The New York Times. New York. p. 2 – via ProQuest.
- Ichsan, Ali Nur (4 August 2023). "Pemerintah Manokwari Konsultasi Publik Pelebaran Jalan Sudjarwo" [Government of Manokwari Consults the Public on the Expansion of Sudjarwo Street]. ANTARA News Papua Tengah (in Indonesian). Archived from the original on 4 February 2026.
- "Kalau WNI di Luar Negeri Noblos Gambar Sama..." [If Indonesians Abroad Choose the Same...]. Kompas. Jakarta. 8 July 1970. p. 1.
- Kami Perkenalkan [We Introduce] (PDF) (in Indonesian). Jakarta: Ministry of Information of Indonesia. 1954.
- "State of Emergency". Time. New York. 18 September 1964. pp. 45–46.
- RB (8 December 1972). "Sudjarwo Tjondronegoro Tutup Usia" [Sudjarwo Tjondronegoro Dies]. Kompas (in Indonesian). Jakarta. pp. 1, 12.
- Saltford, John (April 2000). "United Nations Involvement with the Act of Self-Determination in West Irian (Indonesian West New Guinea) 1968 to 1969". Indonesia (69): 71–92 – via ProQuest.
- "(untitled)" (PDF). Indonesian Affairs. Jakarta: Ministry of Information of Indonesia. 1953.
- "Yan Mandenas Juru Kampanye BRO di Yapen" [Yan Mandenas Campaigning for BRO in Yapen]. KabarPapua.co (in Indonesian). 23 November 2024. Archived from the original on 13 December 2024.
