= Francisco Xavier Lopes da Cruz =

Indonesian politician (born 1941)

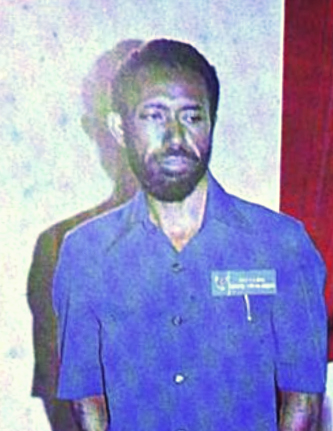

Ambassador of Indonesia to Portugal
- In office 2005–2008
- President: Susilo Bambang Yudhoyono
- Preceded by: Harry Pryohoetomo Haryono
- Succeeded by: Albert Matondang

Ambassador of Indonesia to Greece
- In office 2000–2003
- President: Abdurrahman Wahid; Megawati Soekarnoputri
- Preceded by: Samsubahri Siregar
- Succeeded by: Faisha Hasan Soeftendy

Vice Governor of East Timor
- In office 3 August 1976 – 18 September 1982
- President: Suharto
- Preceded by: Position established
- Succeeded by: Antonius Baldinuci Saridjo

Personal details
- Born: 2 December 1941 (age 84) Maubara, Liquiçá, Portuguese Timor
- Party: Ação Nacional Popular (until 1974); UDT (1974–1975)
- Spouse: Mastura (m. 1958)
- Education: University of Macau

Francisco Xavier Lopes da Cruz (born 2 December 1941) is a former Indonesian Ambassador to Greece and Portugal. He was a supporter of East Timor's integration into Indonesia and served as the Vice Governor of East Timor shortly after the invasion in December 1975.

== Biography ==
Lopes da Cruz was born in Maubara on 2 December 1941. He was the third child of Humberto Lopes da Cruz and Rita da Costa Lopes da Cruz, both of whom were religion teachers at primary school in Maubara. Lopes da Cruz had eight siblings.

In Soibada, Lopes da Cruz attended the Nossa Senhora da Fátima Minor Seminary run by the Jesuits, but he did not complete his studies there. He later studied philosophy at the University of Macau and served in the Portuguese Army as a non-commissioned officer in Mozambique, where he fought against FRELIMO during the Mozambican War of Independence. Lopes da Cruz was the representative of Ação Nacional Popular (National People's Action) in the legislative and consultative council of Portuguese Timor (Assembleia Legislativa e Junta Consultiva Provincial de Timor). He subsequently worked as a customs officer. On 13 September 1974, he became the editor-in-chief of A Voz de Timor, succeeding Manuel António Lourenço Pereira, an officer in the Portuguese Navy. Lopes da Cruz held this position until the end of June 1975, when he was replaced by Fernando de Almeida do Carmo, a member of Fretilin.

After the Carnation Revolution in Portugal, Portuguese Timor was promised independence. Political parties began to emerge in the colony, including the Timorese Democratic Union (UDT), of which Lopes da Cruz was one of the founders. At the time, he was working as a customs officer. The party's chairman, Mário Viegas Carrascalão, was said to have maintained ties that were too close to the former Portuguese dictatorship and was therefore forced to resign. Lopes da Cruz succeeded him as chairman of the UDT. He advocated a gradual path toward the independence of Portuguese Timor. Under his proposal, Portugal would spend ten to fifteen years developing its former colony until it reached a stage where it could sustain itself as a sovereign state. However, Portugal showed little interest in this idea.

In August 1975, the Timorese Democratic Union (UDT) attempted to seize power in Portuguese Timor through a coup d'état. One of its objectives was to provide Indonesia with a pretext for intervention, as the party threatened to expel the allegedly “communist” Fretilin from the territory. Lopes da Cruz himself was arrested by UDT leaders João Viegas Carrascalão and Domingos de Oliveira because he was suspected of collaborating with Indonesia.

On 7 December 1975, Indonesia launched a large-scale invasion of East Timor and occupied the territory. On 31 May 1976, a “people’s assembly” elected by Indonesian intelligence services passed a petition to annex East Timor to Indonesia without a referendum, with all 37 votes in favor. Lopes da Cruz was part of the delegation that presented the petition to Indonesian President Soeharto. On 17 July 1976, East Timor was officially incorporated into Indonesia as its 27th province. On 4 August, Lopes da Cruz was appointed Vice Governor of East Timor. He held this position until 1982, when he was replaced by Antonius Baldinuci Saridjo. Lopes da Cruz served as Soeharto's special advisor on East Timor. During the 1999 East Timor independence referendum, Lopes da Cruz, as Secretary-General of the East Timorese People's Front (BRTT), campaigned for the territory to remain part of Indonesia. He was also the owner of the only private newspaper in East Timor, Suara Timor Timur.

From 2000 to 2003, Lopes da Cruz served as the Indonesian Ambassador to Greece. He later served as Indonesia's ambassador to Portugal. Lopes da Cruz possessed the last Portuguese flag that flew in Portuguese Timor. He kept it as a relic. In a 2019 interview, he further defended Indonesia's occupation of East Timor at the time, stating that most Timorese were killed in fighting among themselves. He also argued that before Indonesia issues an apology, Portugal should apologize for its withdrawal from Timor.

== Awards ==
- Indonesia:
  - Star of Mahaputera (2025)

== Bibliographies ==
- Leach, Michael (2017). Nation-Building and National Identity in Timor-Leste. Routledge.
- Lembaga Publikasi Pendidikan, Kebudayaan dan Pembangunan Indonesia (1978). Album Pembangunan Indonesia Masa Orde Baru. Jakarta: Lembaga Publikasi Pendidikan, Kebudayaan dan Pembangunan Indonesia.
- Lopes da Cruz, Francisco Xavier (1999). Kesaksian: Aku dan Timor Timur. Yayasan Tunas Harapan Timor Lorosae.
- Nicol, Bill (2002). Timor: A Nation Reborn. Equinox Publishing.
- Ramos-Horta, Jose (1997). Funu – Osttimors Freiheitskampf ist nicht vorbei!. Ahriman.
