= Marty Natalegawa =

Indonesian diplomat

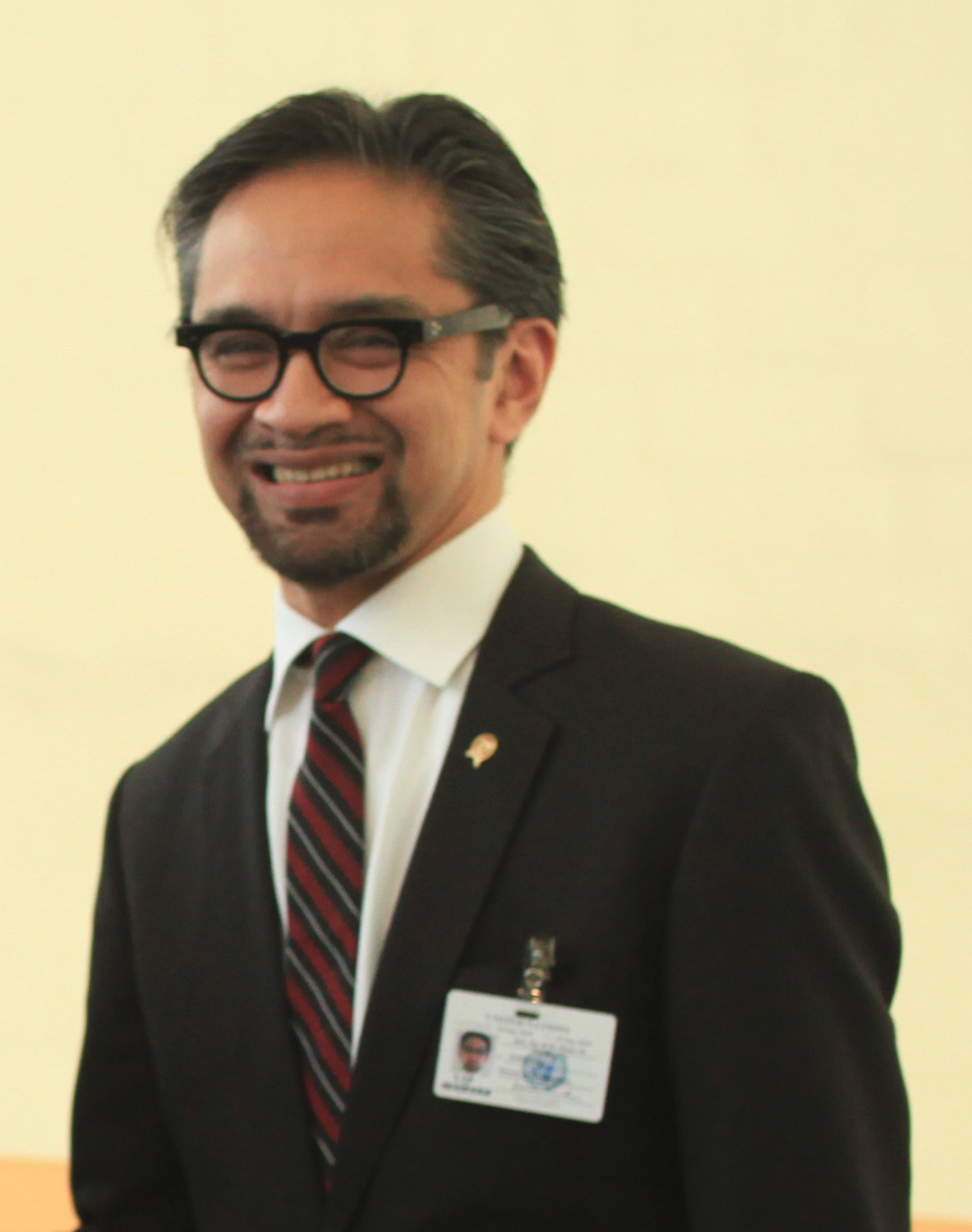
- Natalegawa in 2010

16th Minister of Foreign Affairs
- In office 22 October 2009 – 20 October 2014
- President: Susilo Bambang Yudhoyono
- Preceded by: Hassan Wirajuda
- Succeeded by: Retno Marsudi

16th Permanent Representative of Indonesia to the United Nations
- In office 5 September 2007 – 22 October 2009
- President: Susilo Bambang Yudhoyono
- Preceded by: Rezlan Ishar Jenie
- Succeeded by: Hasan Kleib

17th Ambassador of Indonesia to the United Kingdom
- In office 11 November 2005 – 5 September 2007
- President: Susilo Bambang Yudhoyono
- Preceded by: Juwono Sudarsono
- Succeeded by: Yuri Octavian Thamrin

Director General of ASEAN Cooperation
- In office 6 August 2003 – 28 December 2005; Acting until 28 May 2004
- Preceded by: Abdurrachman Mattalitti
- Succeeded by: Dian Triansyah Djani

Chief of Staff to the Foreign Minister
- In office 1 March 2002 – 6 April 2004
- Preceded by: office established
- Succeeded by: Yuri Octavian Thamrin

Personal details
- Born: 22 March 1963 (age 63) Bandung, West Java, Indonesia
- Party: Independent
- Spouse: Sranya Bamrungphong
- Children: 3
- Education: Ellesmere College; Concord College, Acton Burnell
- Alma mater: London School of Economics (BSc); Corpus Christi College, Cambridge (MPhil); Australian National University
- Profession: Diplomat; civil servant

Mohammad Marty Muliana Natalegawa (born 22 March 1963) is an Indonesian diplomat and was the Minister for Foreign Affairs in the Second United Indonesia Cabinet. He served as Indonesia's Permanent Representative to the United Nations from 5 September 2007 until his latest appointment and has also served as the Indonesian Ambassador to the United Kingdom and as a spokesman for the Ministry of Foreign Affairs of the Republic of Indonesia.

== Early life and education ==
Natalegawa was born in Bandung, West Java. He is the youngest son of Sonson Natalegawa, who was a former director of a state-owned bank. Natalegawa is of Sundanese descent.

Natalegawa went to school at Ellesmere College and Concord College in the United Kingdom, from 1976 to 1981. He earned a BSc at the London School of Economics in 1984. He then went on to study at Corpus Christi College, Cambridge where he was awarded a Master of Philosophy in 1985. Natalegawa also obtained a Doctor of Philosophy at the Australian National University in 1993. He was conferred an Honorary Doctorate in International Relations from the University of Cambodia in 2010.

== Diplomatic service ==
=== UN Office in New York ===
He started his career in the then-Department of Foreign Affairs of Indonesia in 1986 as a staff at the Research and Development Centre. His first service in the Permanent Mission of Indonesia to the United Nations in New York was between 1994 and 1999, including during Indonesia's membership of the Security Council in 1996–1997.

=== Department of Foreign Affairs ===
Upon his return to Jakarta, between 2002 and 2005, he consecutively served as the Chief of Staff of the Office of the Minister for Foreign Affairs and as the Director General for ASEAN Cooperation in the Department of Foreign Affairs. While serving in the aforementioned posts, he concurrently served the position of Spokesperson of the Department of Foreign Affairs.

=== United Kingdom ===
On 11 November 2005, he was sworn in by President Susilo Bambang Yudhoyono as the Indonesian Ambassador to the United Kingdom. In this capacity, he sought to elevate and rejuvenate Indonesia – United Kingdom bilateral relations to a higher level as, inter alia, evidenced in the visit of Prime Minister Tony Blair to Indonesia in March 2006 and the establishment of the Indonesia – United Kingdom Partnership Forum.

=== United Nations ===
On 5 September 2007, he was transferred to New York as Permanent Representative of Indonesia to the United Nations, a position that he held until 2009. His functions included that of President of the Security Council, Chairman of the Special Committee on Decolonization, and Chairman of the UN Security Council Sanctions Committee on the Democratic Republic of the Congo.

== Minister of Foreign Affairs ==
Indonesian President Susilo Bambang Yudhoyono appointed him Minister for Foreign Affairs on 21 October 2009, a position that he held until 2014.

In 2012, he was part of the State visit of President Susilo Bambang Yudhoyono to the United Kingdom. He was appointed an Honorary Knight Commander of the Order of St Michael and St George.

== Honours ==
=== National ===
- Indonesia
  - Star of Mahaputera, 1st Class (25 August 2025)
  - Star of Mahaputera, 2nd Class (13 August 2014)
  - Medal for Providing an Example of Meritorious Personality

=== Foreign honours ===
- United Kingdom:
  - Honorary Knight Commander of the Order of St Michael and St George (KCMG) (2012)
- Japan:
  - Grand Cordon of the Order of the Rising Sun (2025)
- Timor Leste:
  - Collar of the Order of East Timor (2026)

== Personal life ==
Natalegawa is married to the Thai-born Sranya Bamrungphong. The couple have three children, Anantha, Annisa, and Andreyka.

Political offices
Preceded by Hassan Wirajuda	Minister of Foreign Affairs; 2009–2014	Succeeded by Retno Marsudi
Diplomatic posts
Preceded by Rezlan Ishar Jenie	Permanent Representative of Indonesia to the United Nations; 2007–2009	Succeeded by Hasan Kleib
Preceded by Juwono Sudarsono	Ambassador of Indonesia to the United Kingdom; 2005–2007	Succeeded by Yuri Octavian Thamrin
