= Hasan Kleib =

Indonesian diplomat (born 1960)

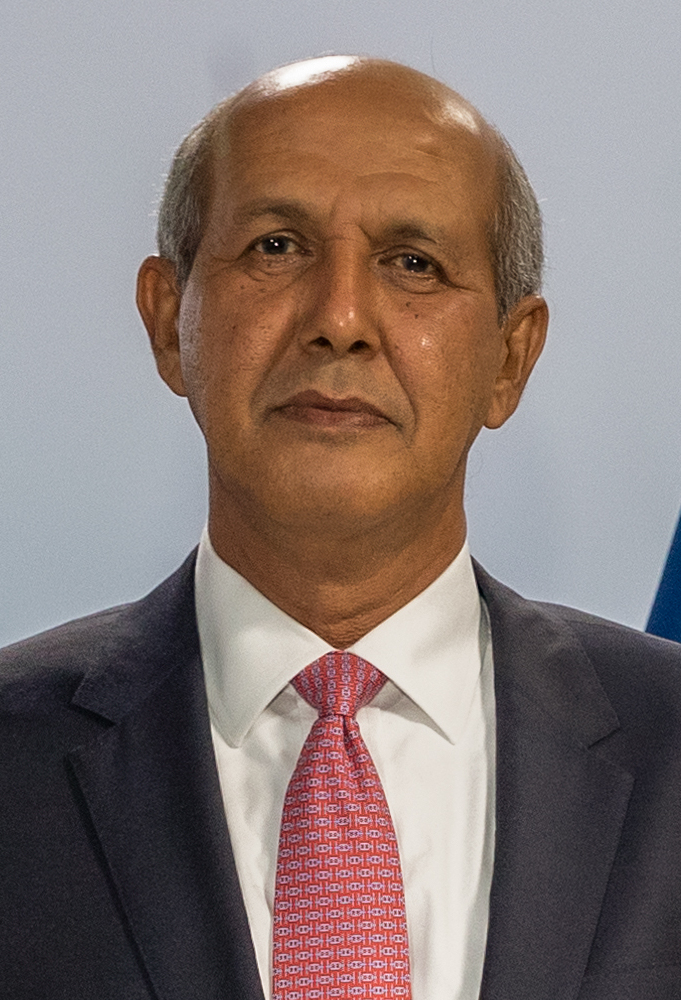
- Hasan Kleib in 2021

15th Permanent Representative of Indonesia to the United Nations in Geneva
- In office 17 November 2017 – 2020
- President: Joko Widodo
- Preceded by: Triyono Wibowo
- Succeeded by: Febrian Alphyanto Ruddyard

17th Permanent Representative of Indonesia to the United Nations
- In office 10 August 2010 – 2011
- President: Susilo Bambang Yudhoyono
- Preceded by: Marty Natalegawa
- Succeeded by: Desra Percaya

Personal details
- Born: October 1, 1960 (age 66) Cirebon, West Java, Indonesia
- Spouse: Azizah Kleib
- Education: Universitas Padjadjaran (B.A.); Monash University (M.A.)
- Profession: Diplomat

Hasan Kleib (born 1 October 1960 in Cirebon, West Java) is an Indonesian diplomat and the current permanent representative of the Republic of Indonesia to the United Nations, World Trade Organizations, and other international organizations in Geneva from March 2017. Previously, he was the director general of multilateral affairs of Indonesia. He served as the permanent representative of the Republic of Indonesia to the United Nations in New York from August 2010 to 2011.

Prior to his appointment, from 2007, Kleib was chargé d'affaires and deputy permanent representative of Indonesia to the United Nations, which included serving as deputy for his country during its non-permanent membership on the Security Council from 2007 to 2008.

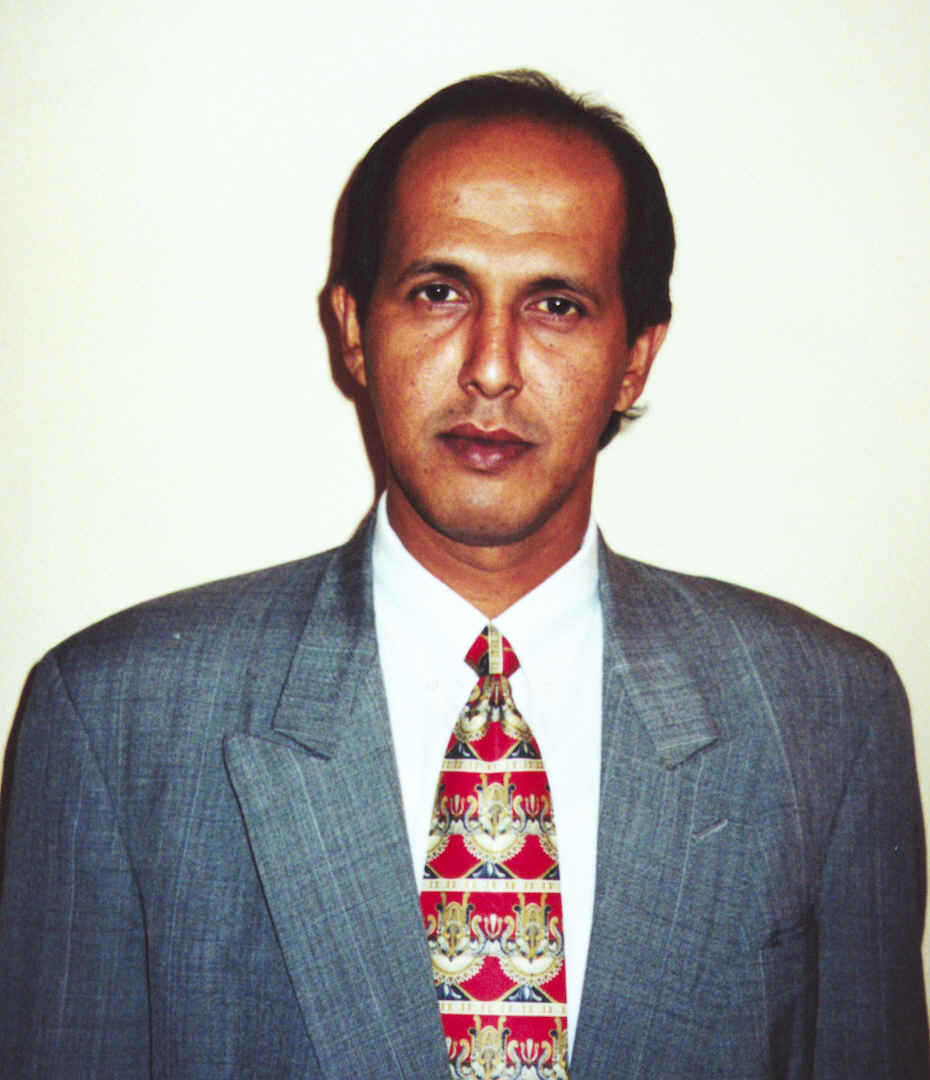
Hasan Kleib during his service at the embassy in Washington D.C.

From 2004 to 2006, Kleib served as director for international security and disarmament affairs at the Department of Foreign Affairs, in Jakarta. Prior to that, from 2000 to 2004, he was head of the political division at the Indonesian embassy in Washington, D.C. He served as head of the disarmament section at the Department of Foreign Affairs, in Jakarta, from 1996 to 2000, and before that, from 1992, he was part of the political staff at Indonesia’s Permanent Mission to the United Nations. From 1988 to 1992, he was head of the Middle East Section in the Department of Foreign Affairs. A career diplomat, Kleib joined the Department of Foreign Affairs in 1987.

== Education ==
Kleib received his master's degree in foreign affairs and trade at Monash University, Australia, in 1997. In 1986 he finished his bachelor's degree in international relations from Padjadjaran University in Bandung, Indonesia.

Diplomatic posts
Preceded by Triyono Wibowo	Permanent Representative of Indonesia to the United Nations in Geneva; 2017–2020	Succeeded by Febrian Alphyanto Ruddyard
Preceded by Marty Natalegawa	Permanent Representative of Indonesia to the United Nations; 2010–2011	Succeeded by Desra Percaya
