= Mochamad Slamet Hidayat =

Indonesian diplomat (born 1953)

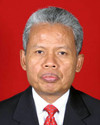

Director General of Multilateral Affairs
- In office 6 February 2006 – June 2007
- Minister: Hassan Wirajuda
- Preceded by: Office established Makmur Widodo (Political, Social, and Security Multilateral Affairs); Susanto Sutoyo (Economic, Financial, and Development Multilateral Affairs)
- Succeeded by: Rezlan Ishar Jenie

Ambassador of Indonesia to Singapore
- In office 12 June 2003 – 6 February 2006
- President: Megawati Sukarnoputri; Susilo Bambang Yudhoyono
- Preceded by: Johan Syahperi Saleh
- Succeeded by: Wardana

Personal details
- Born: September 28, 1953 (age 73) Purbalingga, Central Java, Indonesia
- Spouse: Kartini Binyati
- Children: 3
- Education: Jayabaya University (Drs.); United States International University Africa (MBA)

Mochamad Slamet Hidayat (born 28 September 1953) is an Indonesian diplomat who served as ambassador to Singapore from 2003 to 2006 and director general of multilateral affairs from 2006 to 2007. Throughout his career, he has held numerous leadership roles in international forums, particularly focusing on multilateral economic cooperation and development. In 2008, he was imprisoned for embezzling funds allocated for the renovation of Indonesia's Singapore embassy.

== Early life and education ==
Mochamad Slamet Hidayat was born on 28 September 1953 in Purbalingga. He received his bachelor's degree in law from the Jayabaya University in 1979 and a master's degree in business administration from the United States International University Africa in Nairobi in 1992.

== Diplomatic career ==
Slamet commenced his diplomatic career after completing his basic diplomatic education in 1982. He began his career interning at the permanent mission to the United Nations in New York with the rank of attaché. After two years of service, he was promoted to the rank of third secretary and served at the embassy in Vienna. During this period, Slamet represented Indonesia in the United Nations Industrial Development Organization. He was then recalled to serve as the chief of commodity subsection within the foreign ministry's directorate of multilateral economic relations.

Between 1987 (his UN biography stated 1988) to 1993, Slamet served at the embassy in Nairobi, where he started off with the diplomatic rank of second secretary responsible for economic issues. By 1991, he was promoted to the diplomatic rank of first secretary and served as Indonesia's deputy permanent representative to UN bodies based in Nairobi (United Nations Environment Programme and United Nations Human Settlements Programme). Upon returning to the foreign ministry in 1993, Slamet was appointed as deputy director for UN Economic and Social Bodies. During this period, he completed his mid-level and senior diplomatic education in 1992 and 1993, respectively. He was part of Indonesia's delegation to various official conferences such as the United Nations Conference on Environment and Development, in Rio de Janeiro in 1992 (where he became part of the conference's preparatory committee), the International Conference on Population and Development in Cairo in 1994, and the World Summit on Social Development at Copenhagen in 1995.

Slamet underwent another posting in the UN headquarters, this time in New York, two years into his tenure as a deputy director. In 1995, he became the permanent mission's head of the first economic affairs division, serving with the rank of counsellor. He was promoted to the rank of minister counsellor in 1997 before becoming the deputy permanent representative (the second-in-command) of the mission in 2001. For a brief period between 1999 and 2000, he was recalled to Jakarta as the director of multilateral economic cooperation. Following the departure of permanent representative Makmur Widodo on 25 April 2002, Slamet became the permanent mission's chargé d'affaires ad interim. He was relinquished from his post as deputy permanent representative and, consequently, chargé d'affaires ad interim, in June 2003.

During his posting in New York, Slamet represented Indonesia and developing nations in critical negotiations. In 1998, he served as the spokesperson and main Negotiator for the Group of 77 in New York. He also held the Vice-Presidency of the executive board of the UNDP and UNFPA in 1997. He played a significant role in environmental and developmental governance, serving as member of the United Nations Staff Pension Committee (1998–2000), the vice-chairman of the United Nations Forum on Forests (2001–2002), and as a member of the facilitators of the UN reform in 2002. From 2000 to 2001, he represented Indonesia, Malaysia, and Singapore as executive director for the Common Fund for Commodities.

On 12 June 2003, Slamet was sworn in as Indonesia's ambassador to Singapore. He presented his credentials to president S. R. Nathan on 7 August 2003. During his tenure, Slamet faced protests from the Singapore Tourism Board concerning Indonesia's revocation of visa free access of residents from 37 countries. He also had to resolve the matter of four Indonesian maids who faced death sentence for murder charges. Slamet, who lobbied the Singaporean authorities and hired professional lawyers to represent the maids, managed to secure the reduction of sentences into a life sentence or imprisonment with a fixed term.

After serving in Singapore, Slamet returned to Indonesia for his appointment as director general on 6 February 2006. He was the first director general to lead a unified multilateral agency within the foreign ministry, as previously there were two directorate generals handling different sectors of Indonesia's multilateral relations. During his tenure, he oversaw Indonesia's 2006 chairmanship of the D-8 Organization for Economic Cooperation.

Slamet abruptly resigned as director general in June 2007 following an investigation into his role in the embezzlement of funds earmarked for the renovation of the embassy in Singapore during his ambassadorial tenure from 2003 to 2005, costing the state a loss of IDR 6.4 billion (SGD 505,000). The embezzled funds were later distributed to senior officials within the embassy, with Slamet receiving SGD 280,000. After being investigated by the Corruption Eradication Commission for eight hours, Slamet was imprisoned by the commission on 8 May 2008. The prosecution sought for Slamet to be sentenced for five years in prison on 19 November, and the court finally sentenced Slamet to three years in prison on 17 December 2008. His sentence was reduced to a two-and-a-half year of imprisonment in April next year after Slamet returned the money he had embezzled.

== Personal life ==
Slamet is a Muslim. He is married to Kartini Binyati and has three children.
