= Wieke Adiwoso =

Indonesian diplomat (born 1957)

Adiyatwidi Adiwoso Asmady
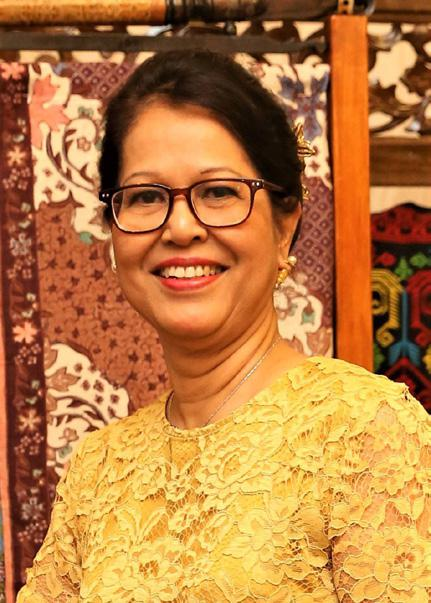

Indonesian Ambassador to Slovakia
- In office 18 May 2017 – 30 September 2021
- President: Joko Widodo
- Preceded by: Djumantoro Purbo
- Succeeded by: Pribadi Sutiono

Indonesian Ambassador to Spain
- In office 20 January 2010 – 2014
- President: Susilo Bambang Yudhoyono
- Preceded by: Slamet Santoso Mustafa
- Succeeded by: Yuli Mumpuni Widarso

Personal details
- Born: Adiyatwidi Adiwoso; 27 May 1957 (age 69) Jakarta, Indonesia
- Spouse: Asmady Parman
- Children: Adipurusa Nidiman Asmady; Adipratnia Satwika Asmady
- Parents: Adiwoso Abubakar (father); Siti Hertini (mother)
- Education: American University (BA); Ohio University (MA)
- Nickname: Wieke

Adiyatwidi "Wieke" Adiwoso Asmady (born 27 May 1957) is an Indonesian career diplomat who served as ambassador to Spain from 2010 to 2014 and to Slovakia from 2017 to 2021. The daughter of former ambassador Adiwoso Abubakar, Wieke joined the foreign ministry in 1982 and had been assigned to diplomatic missions in Brussels and New York.

== Early life and education ==
Wieke was born in Jakarta on 27 May 1957 as the youngest child of Adiwoso Abubakar, a career diplomat who last served as ambassador to Canada, and Siti Hertini. His grandfather from her mother's side, Hermen Kartowisastro, was a member of the Volksraad and was one of the handful Indonesians during his time to receive education in Europe.

Wieke studied international relations at the American University in Washington, D.C. during his father's posting as a diplomat in the country. After receiving her bachelor's degree in 1978, Wieke continued his master's studies on the same subject at the Ohio University, which she completed in 1980.

== Diplomatic career ==
Wieke joined the foreign service shortly after completing her basic diplomatic training in 1982. Her first posting was at the mission in New York, where she served with the rank of third secretary from 1985 to 1988. She then returned to the foreign department as deputy director within the directorate for developing countries economic relations from 1988 to 1994, during which she completed her mid-level diplomatic education in 1992. After a stint as the economics chief at the embassy in Brussels from 1995 to 1998, she completed her senior diplomatic training and became the director for developing countries economic relations in 1999.

In 2000, Wieke became the minister's advisor for economic and industrial relations. She was dual hatted with the position of the minister's chief secretary. Wieke was named as the minister's advisor for regional and multilateral cooperation on 12 March 2001 before returning to her old post as the minister's advisor for economic and industrial relations on 3 May 2002. Throughout this period, she completed a course at the National Resilience Institute in 2002 and retained her responsibilities as the minister's chief secretary until 2003. From 2003 until 2004, Wieke's dual post was switched to the director of the Non-Aligned Movement Centre for South-South Technical Cooperation.

In 2004, Wieke was named as the deputy ambassador to the United Nations with the support of the-then president Megawati Sukarnoputri. Foreign minister Hassan Wirajuda had already appointed Eddy Pratomo for the post, but was superseded by Megawati who wanted a woman at the helm of Indonesia's UN mission. As deputy ambassador, Wieke spoke out on behalf of Indonesia against the formation of the United Nations Human Rights Council in 2005 and supported the presence of Australian troops at Timor-Leste in 2006.

During the sixty-first session of the United Nations General Assembly in 2006, the Singaporean delegate raised the issue of the-then ongoing haze in Indonesia, calling for international cooperation to resolve the issue. Wieke, who represented Indonesia in the forum, stated that Singapore's decision to bring up the haze was an intereference of Indonesia's domestic affairs and accused Singapore of malice. In 2008, Wieke alongside with director general of international law and treaties Arif Havas Oegroseno attended the launching of UN's Stolen Asset Recovery Initiative, which sparked controversy as it listed Indonesia's longtime president Suharto as the world's most corrupt leader. At the completion of her tenure in New York, Wieke briefly became the foreign minister's senior advisor for economic and socio-cultural relations.

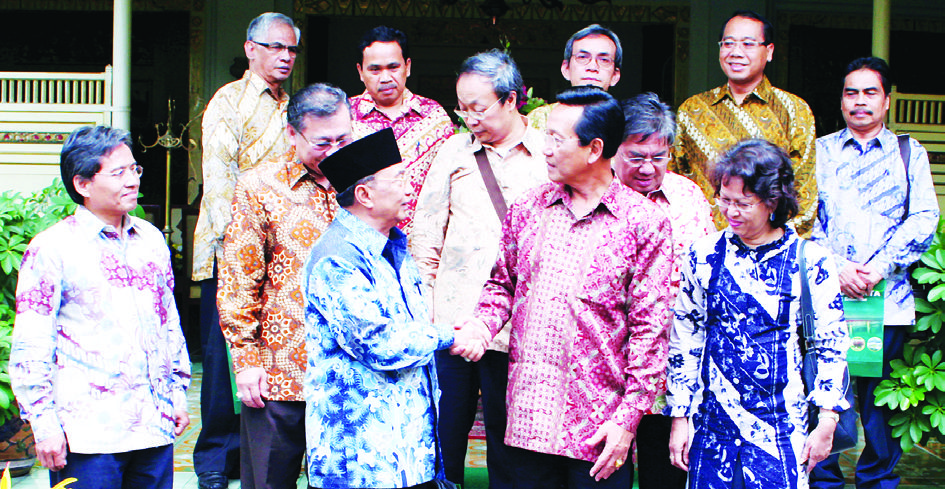
Wieke (first row, far right) with other ambassador candidates during a reception by the Governor of Yogyakarta Hamengkubuwono X, 2009

Wieke was nominated by president Susilo Bambang Yudhoyono as ambassador to Spain in August 2009. After successfully passing an assessment by the House of Representative's first commission, Wieke was sworn in on 20 January 2010. Wieke presented her credentials to King Juan Carlos I of Spain on 5 July 2010. Wieke's credential presentation had been scheduled for the month before, but was suspended due to the king's health complications.

During his tenure, she oversaw an MoU on public works and transportation between the two countries' government. She also initiated Indonesia's culinary diplomacy in the country by organizing semana gastronomia (gastronomic week) in Madrid and Sevilla since 2010 and launched a Spanish language cookbook on Indonesian recipes titled La Exotica Cocina de Indonesia at Indonesia's 67th independence day anniversary reception in 2012. Also in 2012, two new Indonesian-Spanish friendship organizations were established, the cultural oriented Nusantara and the economic oriented Spaindo.

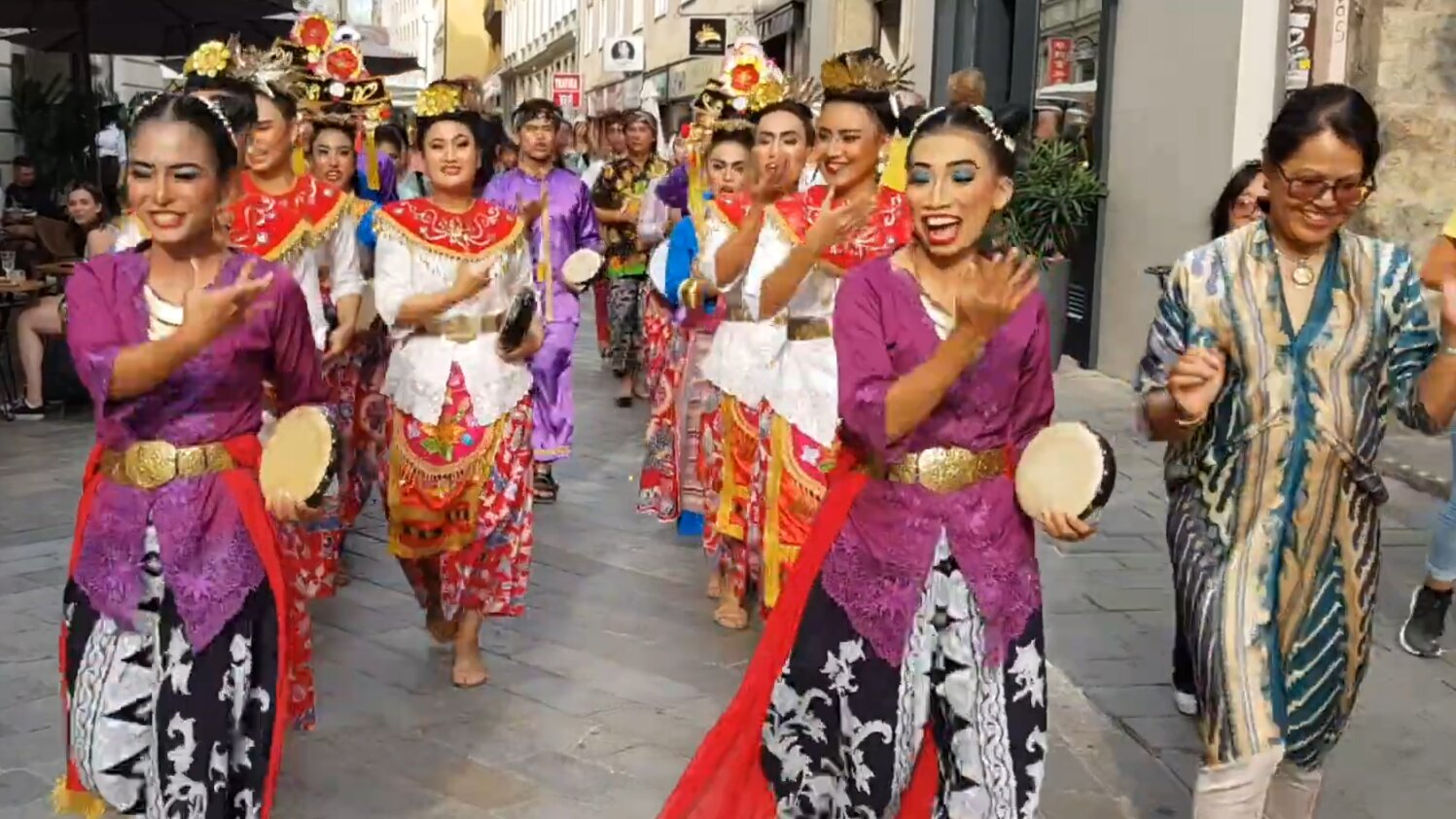
Wieke (far right) dancing with the University of Indonesia's dance league at Bratislava in 2019

From Spain, Wieke returned to Indonesia to serve as the deputy chairwoman of the D-8 Organization for Economic Cooperation's group of expert from 2014 to 2015. Wieke then became a member of the foreign ministry's working group on economic diplomacy, being nominally assigned as a senior diplomat to the multilateral directorate general. In November 2016, Wieke was nominated by president Joko Widodo as ambassador to Slovakia. After passing an assessment by the House of Representative's first commission on 13 December 2016, Wieke was sworn in as ambassador on 18 May 2017. Wieke began her duties in Bratislava on the 11th of July and presented her credentials to president Andrej Kiska on 12 September. In Slovakia, Wieke continued promoting Indonesia through culinary diplomacy, including by inviting Slovak presenter Justin Topolsky to introduce Indonesian gastronomy at the Dobrej Chuti A Vina (Food and Wine) Festival in 2017.

During the COVID-19 pandemic in Slovakia, Wieke oversaw the distribution of social assistance to Indonesians living in the country. The embassy sought to facilitate Indonesia's government cooperation with Slovakia in procuring vaccines and test kits. The embassy also initiated a virtual Indonesian house as a platform to introduce tourism, investment, and trade to stakeholders in Slovakia. In 2021, the embassy organized traditional fashion bazaar and photo exhibition to introduce Indonesia's presence in Slovakia.

== Personal life ==
Wieke Adiwoso is married to Asmady Parman, a retired government official and industrial engineer. The couple has two children: Adipurusa Nidiman Asmady, a banker at the state-owned BNI Sekuritas, and Adipratnia Satwika Asmady who is working as a director at SpaceX and was known for her role in designing Indonesia's Satria-1 satellite.
