= Khailan Syamsu =

Indonesian activist and Esperantist (1905–1962)

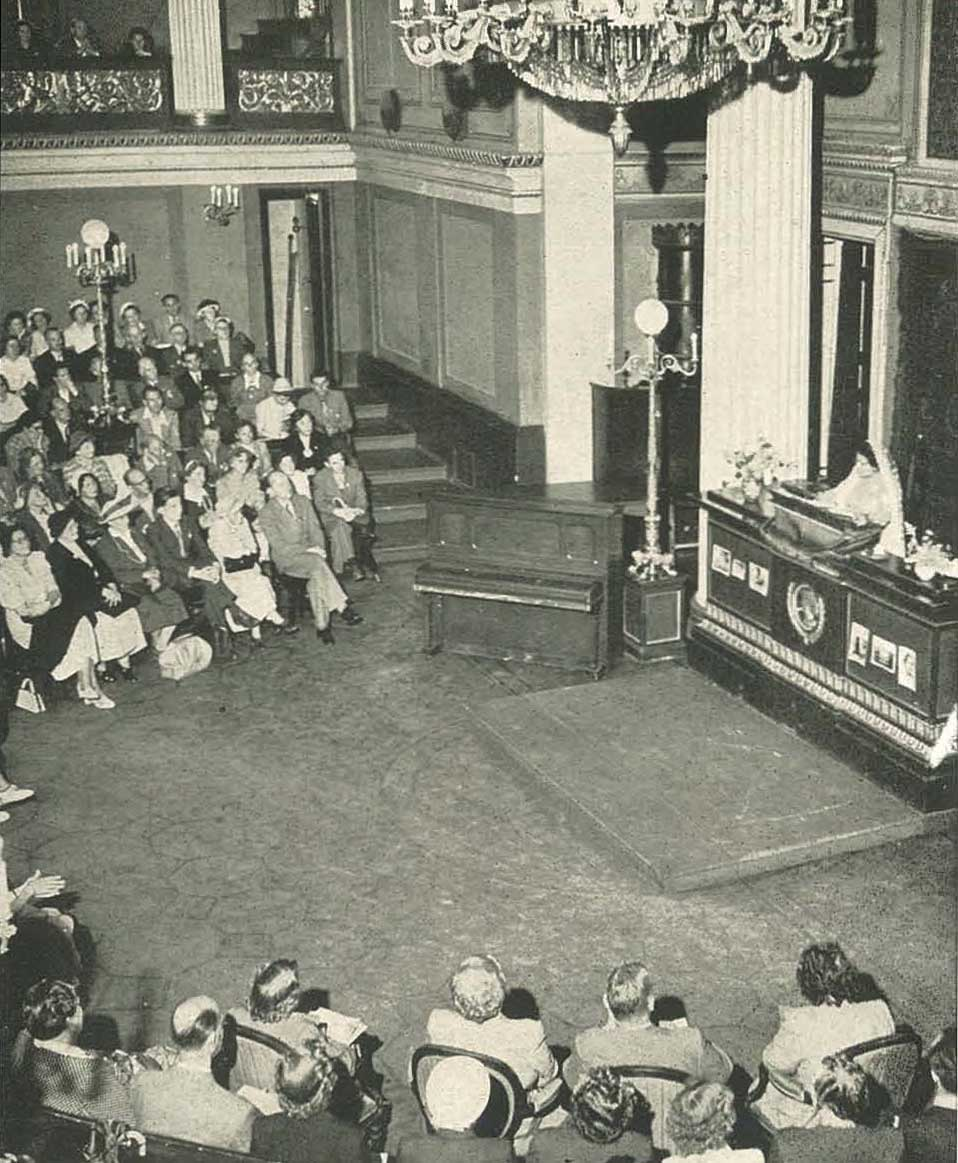
- Khailan speaking at the Esperanto Conference in Oslo in 1953
- Born: 6 April 1905; Bukittinggi, Dutch East Indies
- Died: 23 September 1962 (aged 57); Jakarta, Indonesia
- Occupations: Human rights activist Esperantist

Rangkayo Khailan Syamsu (6 April 1905 – 23 September 1962) was an Indonesian human rights activist and Esperantist who was a prominent figure in the struggle for women's rights and Indonesian independence in the Dutch East Indies. In addition, Khailan was active in the Esperanto language movement, and served as president of both the South Asian Esperanto Federation and the Islamic Esperanto Association.

== Early life ==
Khailan was born on 6 April 1905 in Bukittinggi on the island of Sumatra, into a Minangkabau family. She attended Dutch-language schools as a child. She married Lanjumin Dt. Tumangguang, a journalist from Sungai Puar who had represented the indigenous civil service in the Volksraad; they had five children together and lived in Jakarta.

== Activism ==
=== Women's rights ===
Khailan and fellow activist Rukmini Santoso were among the most prominent women's rights activists in the Dutch East Indies during the 1930s, where they campaigned for the rights of women to vote and to serve in the Volksraad. Khailan was a member of the Vereeniging voor Vrouwenkiesrecht in Nederlands-Indië (lit. 'Association for Women's Suffrage in the Dutch East Indies'), briefly taking on a prominent leadership role in the organisation, one of two Indonesian women to serve in such capacity among its largely Dutch membership; she was credited with maintaining the organisation's position of advocating for Indonesian women as well as Dutch women.

In 1931, Khailan became the chairperson of the newly founded Perkumpulan Pemberantasan Perdagangan Perempuan dan Anak-Anak (P4A; lit. 'Association for the Eradication of Trafficking in Women and Children'), which addressed issues of trafficking and child marriage, remaining in the role for four years. In 1932, she founded the magazine Pedoman Isteri (lit. 'Wife's Guide'), serving as its editor until 1939; in addition to reporting on politics and women's issues, the magazine also provided advice and tips on baking, ironing and washing. The magazine became the mouthpiece of the Persatuan Isteri Pegawai/Priyayi Bestuur (PIPB; lit. 'Officers/Administrative Officers' Wives Association'), of which she served as president.

=== Esperanto movement ===
Following Indonesian successfully achieving independence in 1949, Khailan travelled to Europe, where she began studying Esperanto in 1950. She began to actively participate in Esperanto movement meetings, the World Esperanto Congress, in various countries. Khailan headed the Indonesian delegation at the Internacia Somera Universitato (lit. 'International Summer University') in Oslo, Norway in 1953 and Montevideo, Uruguay, where she made speeches; she also attended the Universala Ekspozicio, an Esperanto exhibition held in Buenos Aires, Argentina.

Upon returning to Indonesia in 1952, Khailan became one of the main driving forces behind the Esperantist movement in the country, founding and serving as president of the Indonezia Esperanto-Asocio (lit. 'Indonesian Esperanto Association') that same year; the organisation by 1959 had clubs in Jakarta, Bandung, Yogyakarta, Magelang, Semarang, Surabaya, Malang, Denpasar, Waingapu, Lubuklinggau and Makassar. In 1958, Khailan became president of the Sudazia Esperanto-Federacio, covering South Asia; and, in 1959, president of the Islama Esperanto-Asocio (lit. 'Islamic Esperanto Movement').

Alongside Liem Tjong Hie, Soen Kiat Liong and Hasan Basri, Khailan was among the key figures of the Esperanto movement in Indonesia. Following her death in 1962, the movement began to fall apart, particularly following the anti-communist mass killings of the mid-1960s, due to Esperanto being perceived as linked with communism.

== Death ==
Khailan died in Jakarta on 23 September 1962 at the age of 57.
