= Hassan Wirajuda =

Indonesian politician

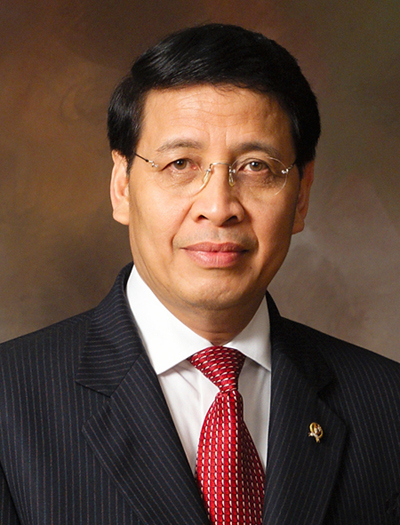
- Wirajuda as Foreign Minister, 2001

Member of the Presidential Advisory Council Foreign Relations and International Affairs
- In office 25 January 2010 – 20 October 2014
- President: Susilo Bambang Yudhoyono
- Chairperson: Emil Salim
- Preceded by: Ali Alatas

15th Minister of Foreign Affairs
- In office 9 August 2001 – 20 October 2009
- President: Megawati Sukarnoputri; Susilo Bambang Yudhoyono
- Preceded by: Alwi Shihab
- Succeeded by: Marty Natalegawa

Director General of Political Affairs
- In office 17 July 2000 – 9 August 2001
- Preceded by: Nugroho Wisnumurti
- Succeeded by: Rezlan Ishar Jenie (acting)

10th Permanent Representative of Indonesia to the United Nations in Geneva
- In office December 1998 – July 2000
- President: B. J. Habibie; Abdurrahman Wahid
- Preceded by: Agus Tarmidzi
- Succeeded by: Nugroho Wisnumurti

Ambassador of Indonesia to Egypt and Djibouti
- In office October 1997 – December 1998
- President: Suharto; B. J. Habibie
- Preceded by: Boer Mauna
- Succeeded by: Quraish Shihab

Personal details
- Born: 9 July 1948 (age 78) Tangerang, West Java (now Banten), Indonesia
- Relations: Wahidin Halim (brother)
- Children: Adhyastri Karmisanti Wirajuda-Abdullah, Tunggul Mintara Dharma Wirajuda, Adhyanti Sardanarini Wirajuda, Adhyani Noer Indrati Wirajuda
- Education: University of Virginia; Tufts University; Harvard University; University of Oxford
- Profession: Diplomat

Noer Hassan Wirajuda (born 9 July 1948) is an Indonesian politician who was the foreign minister of Indonesia from 2001 to 2009. He served during the presidencies of Megawati Sukarnoputri and Susilo Bambang Yudhoyono.

== Education ==
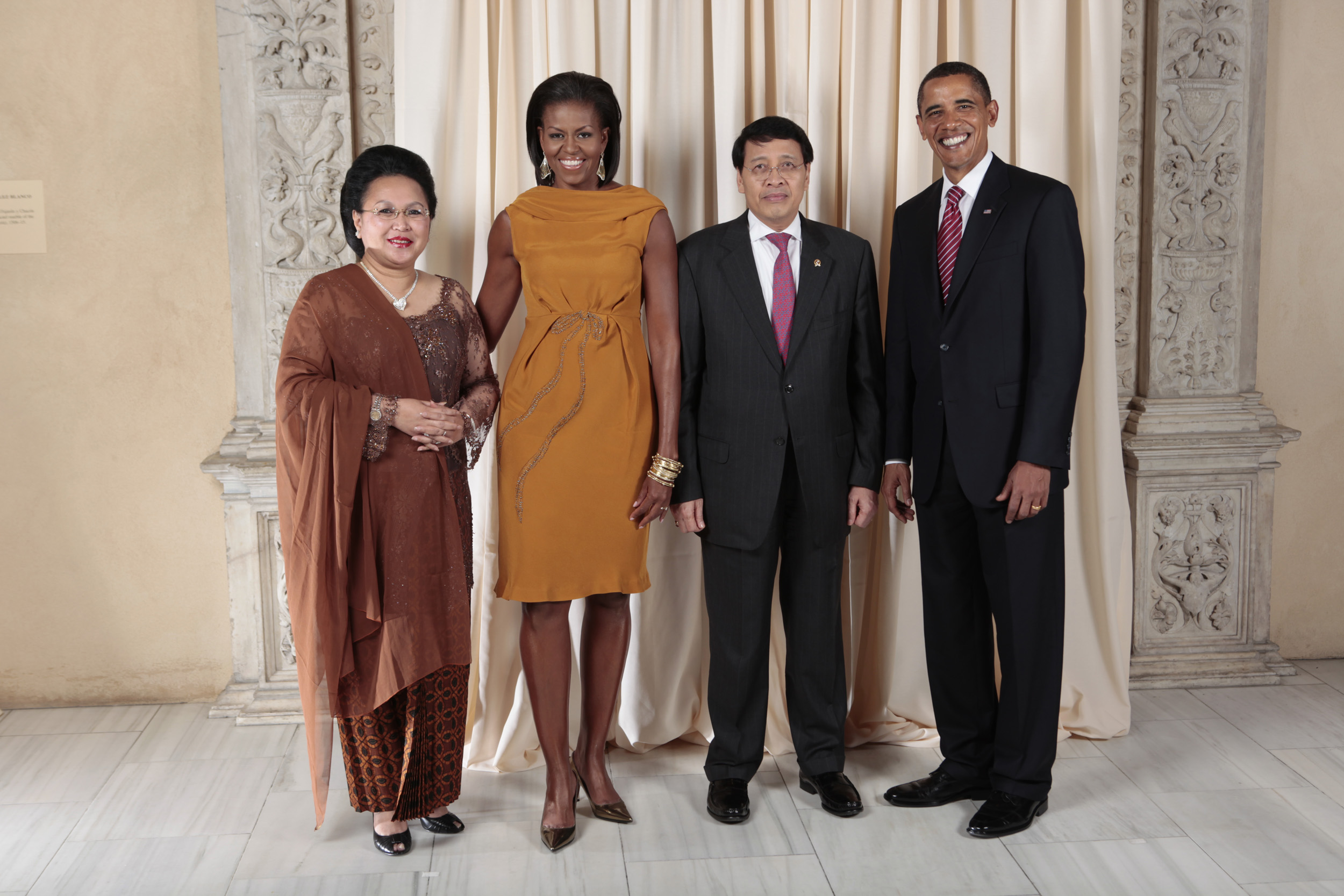
Noer Hassan Wirajuda and his wife with Michelle and Barack Obama in a reception in the Metropolitan Museum in NYC in September 2009

Wirajuda earned a Doctor of Juridical Science in international law from the University of Virginia School of Law (1981), a Master of Law (LL.M) from Harvard University School of Law (1985), and a Master of Arts in Law and Diplomacy (MALD) from the Fletcher School of Law and Diplomacy at Tufts University (1984).

In 1971, he graduated from the Faculty of Law of the University of Indonesia, and in 1976, he spent a year at Oxford University in the United Kingdom earning a Certificate in Diplomacy.

== Diplomatic career ==
A lawyer by training and a diplomat by choice, Wirajuda has held several important posts including Director-General of Political Affairs of the Ministry of Foreign Affairs (July 2000 – August 2001), Ambassador and Permanent Representative to the United Nations and other international organizations in Geneva (December 1998 – July 2000), Ambassador Extraordinary and Plenipotentiary to Egypt (October 1997 – December 1998), and Director of International Organizations of the Department of Foreign Affairs (1993–1997).

On 6 February 2009, Wirajuda criticized Myanmar for their abuse of Rohingya people, after nearly 400 Rohingya refugees were rescued off the coast of Sumatra in the first month of 2009.

In 2007 he chaired the first Indonesia-UK forum alongside British foreign minister Margaret Beckett.

Wirajuda was the proponent of the ASEAN Political and Security Community (of the three pillars of the ASEAN Community) with core values in the promotion of democracy, respect for human rights, good governance, and the establishment of an ASEAN Human Rights body which would later become the ASEAN Intergovernmental Commission on Human Rights (AICHR). He actively championed a more inclusive and balanced East Asia, as reflected by the first East Asia Summit of 16 member states in 2005.

On 22 October 2009, Marty Natalegawa was appointed foreign minister.

During his diplomatic career, Wirajuda also assisted in the establishment of the Indonesian National Commission on Human Rights (Komnas HAM).

Since 2023, Wirajuda is serving as chairman of the Study Centre on Indonesian Nationhood (PSKI) and dean at the School of Law and International Studies at Prasetiya Mulya University.

== Honours ==
=== National ===
- Indonesia
  - Star of Mahaputera, 1st Class (25 August 2025)
  - Star of Mahaputera, 2nd Class (13 August 2011)

=== Foreign honours ===
- Japan:
  - Grand Cordon of the Order of the Rising Sun (2023)
- Philippines:
  - Grand Cross (Datu) of the Order of Sikatuna (GCrS) (2008)
- Timor Leste:
  - Collar of the Order of East Timor (2026)

Political offices
Preceded by Alwi Shihab	Minister of Foreign Affairs; 2001–2009	Succeeded by Marty Natalegawa
