= Makarim Wibisono =

Indonesian diplomat and former UN expert

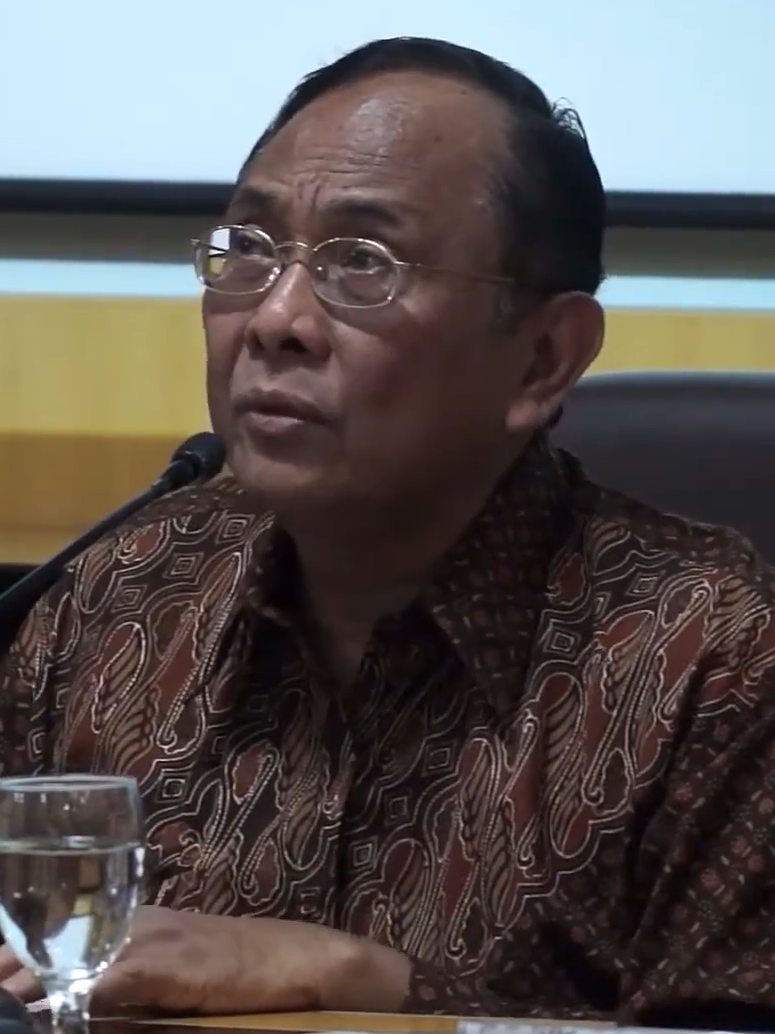
- Wibisono in 2016

United Nations Special Rapporteur on the Situation of Human Rights in the Palestinian Territories Occupied since 1967
- In office 2014–2016
- Preceded by: Richard A. Falk
- Succeeded by: Michael Lynk

Personal details
- Born: 8 May 1947 (age 79) Mataram, West Nusa Tenggara, Indonesia
- Education: Gadjah Mada University; Ohio State University

Makarim Wibisono (born 8 May 1947) is an Indonesian diplomat and the former Special Rapporteur on the situation of human rights in the Palestinian territories.

== Early life ==
Wibisono has a masters in International Political Economy from Ohio State University after which he completed his PhD in political science. He has another masters in International Relations from Johns Hopkins University.

== Career ==
From 1997 to 2000, Wibisono was the Permanent Representative of Indonesia to the United Nations in New York City. He was the Chairperson of the APEC Counter Terrorism Task Force from 2003 to 2004.

From 2004 to 2007, Wibisono was the Permanent Representative of Indonesia to the United Nations in Geneva.

Wibisono was the ASEAN Foundation Executive from 2011 to 2014. In May 2014, he was appointed the Special Rapporteur on the situation of human rights in the Palestinian. He resigned in 2016 after Israel refused him access to Gaza and the West Bank. He was replaced by Canadian Michael Lynk.

Wibisono was appointed the chairman of the National Non-Judicial Team on Solving Past Violation of Human Rights in Indonesia in 2022.
