= Triyono Wibowo =

Indonesian diplomat (born 1952)

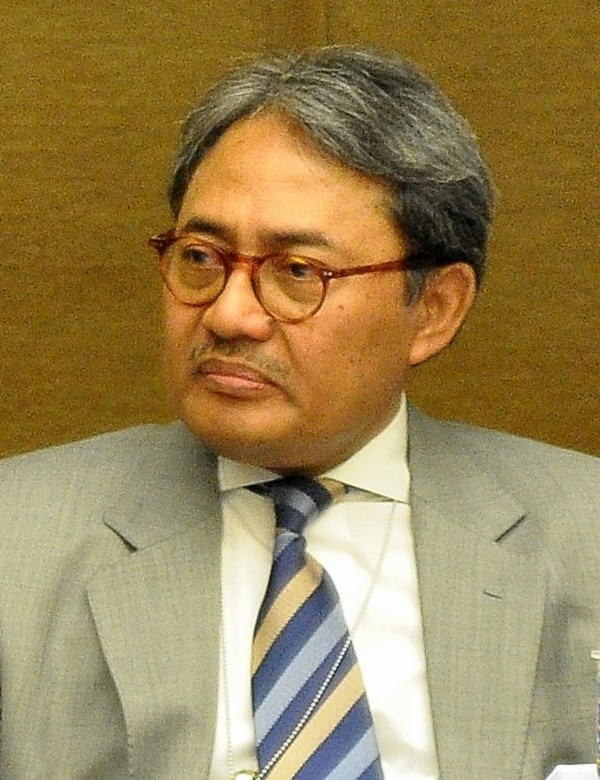

Vice Minister of Foreign Affairs
- In office 11 September 2008 – 19 October 2011
- President: Susilo Bambang Yudhoyono
- Minister: Hassan Wirajuda; Marty Natalegawa
- Preceded by: Tamzil (1948)
- Succeeded by: Wardana

Permanent Representative of Indonesia to the United Nations Office at Geneva
- In office 3 September 2012 – January 2017
- President: Susilo Bambang Yudhoyono; Joko Widodo
- Preceded by: Dian Triansyah Djani
- Succeeded by: Hasan Kleib

Ambassador of Indonesia to Austria and Slovenia
- In office 11 November 2005 – 2008
- President: Susilo Bambang Yudhoyono
- Preceded by: T. A. Samodra Sriwidjaja
- Succeeded by: I Gusti Agung Wesaka Puja

Secretary General of the Ministry of Foreign Affairs
- Acting
- In office July 2010 – 18 October 2010
- Minister: Marty Natalegawa
- Preceded by: Imron Cotan
- Succeeded by: Budi Bowoleksono

Personal details
- Born: 14 June 1952 (age 74) Kediri, East Java, Indonesia
- Relations: Jose Antonio Morato Tavares (son-in-law)
- Education: Airlangga University (Drs.)
- Occupation: Diplomat
- Awards: Star of Mahaputera (3rd Class)

Triyono Wibowo (born 14 June 1952) is an Indonesian career diplomat who was Indonesia's vice minister of foreign affairs from 2008 to 2011, becoming the first person to hold the office after more than six decades. Previously, he served as the ambassador to Austria, Slovenia, and the United Nations Office at Vienna from 2006 to 2008 and the senior advisor to the foreign minister for management affairs from 2004 to 2006. In the course of his three decades of diplomatic career, Triyono mostly held economic related positions and had been posted in Vienna, New York, and Washington.

== Early life and education ==
Triyono was born in Kediri on 14 June 1952. He began studying law at the Airlangga University in 1972 and graduated seven years later with a bachelor's degree. He joined the foreign ministry in 1980 and underwent a two-year basic diplomatic education.

== Diplomatic career ==
=== Junior diplomat ===
Triyono's initial assignment in the foreign ministry was as a desk officer for North European affairs from 1982 to 1984. He was then assigned at the political section of the Indonesian embassy in Vienna with the rank of third secretary from 1985 to 1989, serving under ambassador Artati Marzuki-Sudirdjo. After several months working in the embassy, Triyono received a satisfactory assessment for his duties and was recommended to receive dual accreditation to the permanent mission in Vienna. When Artati was elected chair of the International Atomic Energy Agency board of governors, Triyono assisted her as an alternate member within the board of governors. After his service, from 1988 to 1991 Triyono returned to Indonesia as the deputy director (chief of subdirectorate) within the directorate for multilateral economic cooperation.

Triyono underwent another posting overseas at the economic section of the permanent mission to the United Nations in New York, serving with the rank of first secretary from 1991 to 1995. He then returned to the directorate for multilateral economic cooperation, serving as the deputy director for economic relations with developing countries in 1996. During this period, Triyono took part in the establishment of the Indian Ocean Rim Association D-8 Organization for Economic Cooperation, aimed at enhancing multilateral cooperation between developing countries. After completing his duties as deputy director, in 1999 Triyono returned to the United States and headed the economic section of Indonesia's embassy in the country. He started off with the rank of counsellor before promoted to the rank of minister counsellor at the end of his tenure. Triyono was tasked to revive the trust of foreign investor in the U.S., which had been severely influenced by the financial crisis at that time.

=== Bureaucratic reform ===
From Washington, Triyono returned to the foreign ministry, which at that time was undergoing a massive reorganization. He was appointed as the secretary of the-then newly established directorate general of America and Europe on 3 May 2002 before becoming the foreign ministry's chief of personnel bureau. According to diplomat Muhammad Takdir, Triyono, alongside with secretary general Sudjadnan Parnohadiningrat and chief of planning bureau Ibnu Said, was responsible for directing administrative and organizational reformation in the foreign ministry. He was considered part of the foreign ministry's old guard, who were a group senior diplomats holding key positions within the ministry.

On 6 April 2004, Triyono was appointed by foreign minister Hassan Wirajuda as his acting senior advisor for managerial affairs. In his new position, Triyono was responsible for the ministry's organization as well as diplomatic missions abroad. He was later appointed permanently for the position and was dual-hatted to lead the foreign ministry's crisis settlement task force. He took part in handling cases of Indonesians being taken hostage in Philippines and Iraq, with the latter involving Metro TV presenter Meutya Hafid, who later became Indonesia's minister of communications and digital affairs.

=== Ambassador to Austria and Slovenia ===
Several months into his advisory duties, Triyono was nominated as ambassador to South Africa by president Susilo Bambang Yudhoyono. After undergoing an assessment by the House of Representatives first commission on 4 July 2005, the commission approved his nomination but recommended some changes on the host countries of ambassador. Triyono's host country was exchanged with career diplomat Sugeng Rahardjo, who was initially nominated for Austria. Triyono and Sugeng was sworn in as ambassador on 11 November 2005. He presented credentials to president Heinz Fischer of Austria on 9 January 2006, the Director-General of the United Nations Office at Vienna Antonio Maria Costa on 12 January, and president Janez Drnovšek of Slovenia on 9 February. As ambassador, Triyono played a role in raising funds from Austrian donors for the occasion of the 2004 Indian Ocean earthquake and tsunami and initiated a biannual interfaith and intercultural forum. On one occasion, Triyono attempted to bring komodo dragon and orangutan to Slovenia as a way to introduce Indonesia, but was halted due to a lack of special passport and presidential approval. Triyono's correspondence with the culture minister and the forestry minister was left unaddressed.

=== Vice foreign minister ===
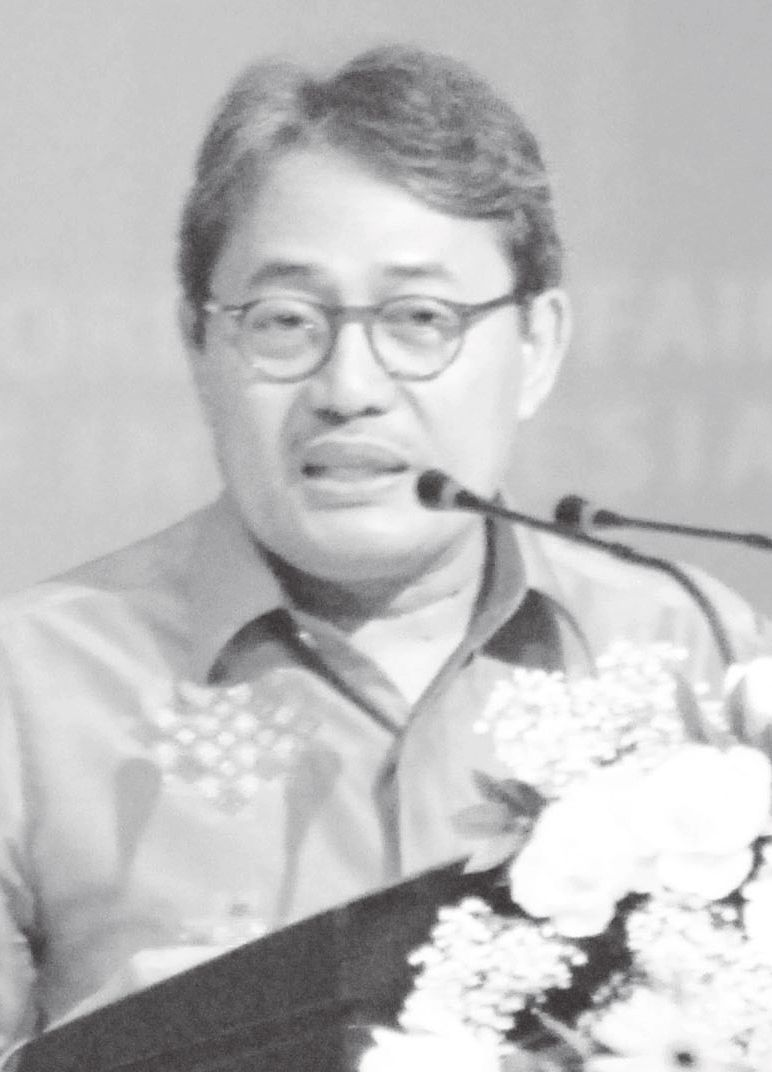
Triyono Wibowo delivering a speech at a seminar on the Gorontalo province potentials in 2012.

On 10 March 2008, president Susilo Bambang Yudhoyono signed a decree which reestablished the post of vice foreign minister, a position last occupied in 1948. The new position sparked criticism from lawmakers, with Slamet Effendi Yusuf of Golkar questioning the need for an additional assistant for the foreign minister, while Yuddy Chrisnadi questioning the vice foreign minister's job description as well as the expenditures for the new position in times of budget cuts. In response, Hassan ensured that the post is necessary to assist the foreign minister's duties in light of the president's directive to increase the intensity of diplomacy and to uphold the principle of equivalence with Indonesia's counterpart in negotiations. Meidyatama Suryodiningrat, now Indonesian ambassador to Romania, stated that establishing the post was a "sensible move" and signalled the end of "the foreign minister as a 'one man show'".

Several names were proposed to held the new position, including junior diplomats such as representative to the UN Marty Natalegawa, presidential spokesman Dino Patti Djalal, as well as senior diplomats such as former representative to UN Makarim Wibisono and director general of multilateral affairs Rezlan Ishar Jenie. However, the choice landed on Triyono, who on 8 September was summoned by foreign minister Hassan. Triyono initially thought he was summoned regarding his works as the top diplomat in Vienna, but was shocked upon learning of his appointment as the vice foreign minister as he was never mentioned as a strong candidate. Triyono was selected following a selection process.

Triyono's appointment was welcomed by politicians, with lawmakers such as Hajriyanto Y. Thohari, Theo L Sambuaga, and Andreas Pareira highlighting his experience and capability. Hajriyanto lamented the lack of political powers of the new post, as he felt that it hindered the effectiveness of the position. Other lawmakers criticized the background of Triyono, with Abdillah Toha suggesting the position should be dedicated for a political appointee, while Happy Bone Zulkarnaen expected a civil servant from outside the foreign service to occupy the post.

As the position was a bureaucrating posting and not part of the cabinet, Triyono was sworn in on 11 September by the foreign minister instead of the president. Triyono's appointment inspired the amendment to the law on state ministries, which gave way to the appointment of vice ministers on other ministries. After Triyono, all vice ministers were appointed through a presidential decree instead of a ministerial appointment, making Triyono the only vice minister not to be installed by the president.

During his tenure, Triyono visited Portugal to meet with his counterpart João Gomes Cravinho to discuss strengthening bilateral relations between the two countries. In response to Indonesia's massive amount of unpaid parking tickets in the United Nations (UN) New York City headquarters, Triyono proposed lobbying the city government, and idea which was later dismissed as nonsensical. Triyono was replaced by his underclassman Wardana on 19 October. For his role as vice foreign minister, on 13 October 2014 Triyono received Indonesia's highest award, the Star of Mahaputera, 3rd class.

=== Permanent representative to the UN ===
After the end of his term as vice foreign minister, cabinet secretary Sudi Silalahi announced Triyono's appointment to a "position of equivalent importance". He was nominated by president Susilo Bambang Yudhoyono as Indonesia's permanent representative to UN and international agencies based in Geneva, with him undergoing an assessment by the House of Representative's first commission on 12 June 2012. He was sworn in by the president on 3 September and presented his credentials to director general of the United Nations Office at Geneva Kassym-Jomart Tokayev on 25 October. During his tenure as ambassador, which saw Indonesia's chairmanship of the Group of 77 in Geneva, Triyono initiated a training program for diplomats from developing countries.

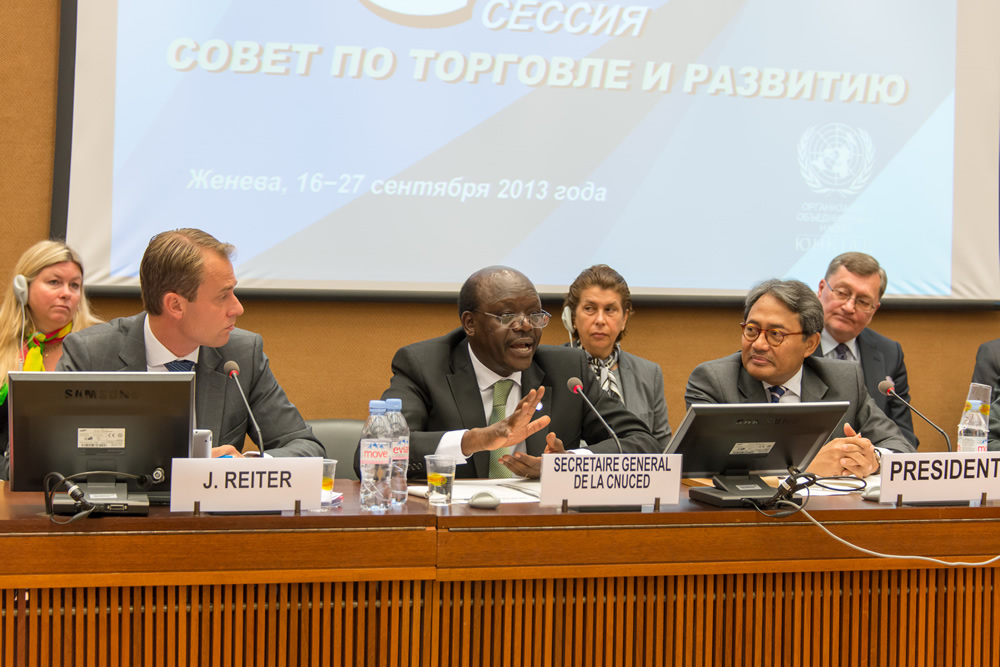
Triyono (far right) as the president of the TDB-UNCTAD in 2013.

In 2013, Triyono became the president of the Conference on Disarmament. During his tenure, Triyono conducted consultations with member states to bring the conference back to life. Despite this he stated that "there is a long way to go to reach consensus" in his farewell address. In the same year, on 16 September 2013, Triyono was unanimously elected as the president of the Trade and Development Board of the United Nations Conference on Trade and Development (TDB-UNCTAD). Throughout his one-year tenure, which lasted until the next September, Triyono presided over the 50th anniversary of the UNCTAD, reporting its activities to the United Nations General Assembly Second Committee in October, and taking part in the UN ECOSOC High Level Meeting with IMF and the World Bank in April.

== Airlangga University ==
Outside his duties as a diplomat, Triyono was a member of the board of trustees at the Airlangga University. He participated in the internal rector in 2010, but was absent at the next election in 2015. On 12 October 2013, Triyono received an honorary doctorate in law from the university, making him the university's fourth honorary doctor. According to the rector, he was conferred the title due to his rare expertise in nuclear law.

== Personal life ==
Triyono is married to Moeliek Farida and has three children. His eldest daughter Fitria A.H. Wimurti is married to Jose Antonio Morato Tavares, the current ambassador of Indonesia to Russia.
