= Winanto Adi =

Indonesian diplomat (born 1968)

Ambassador of Indonesia to Kuwait
- Incumbent
- Assumed office pending confirmation
- Preceded by: Lena Maryana

Personal details
- Born: 2 January 1968 (age 58) Surakarta, Central Java, Indonesia
- Spouse: Harini Septiana
- Children: 3
- Education: Gadjah Mada University (Drs.); London School of Economics (M.Sc.)

Winanto Adi (born 2 January 1968) is an Indonesian career diplomat who is the nominee for Indonesia's ambassador to Kuwait. He is currently Indonesia's consul general in New York, serving in the position since 2023, and previously served as the secretary of the directorate general of protocol and consular affairs and as the head of the foreign ministry's human resources bureau.

== Life and education ==
Born on 2 January 1968 in Surakarta, Central Java, Winanto graduated from the Gadjah Mada University with a bachelor's degree in international relations in 1992. After he was admitted to the foreign ministry in 1993, he attained his master's degree in European studies from the London School of Economics in 1999.

Winanto is married to Harini Septiana, who is currently working as a senior urban designer in Doha, Qatar. The couple has three children.

== Diplomatic career ==
After completing his basic diplomatic education, Winanto was assigned to the directorate general of ASEAN cooperation from 1995 to 2000. Adi's maiden assignment overseas was at Indonesia's consulate general in Frankfurt, where he served as a junior diplomat from 2001 to 2004. Following a stint in the directorate of Central and South Asia of the foreign ministry from 2004 to 2006, he returned to overseas service at the embassy in Nairobi in 2007. He was in charge of economic affairs and served under ambassadors Djismun Kasri and Budi Bowoleksono. During his tenure there, in 2009 Winanto was responsible in preparing and assisting the visit of Joko Widodo, the-then mayor of his hometown Surakarta, to attend the UN Architect Meeting. According to Winanto, Joko travelled there to promote Solo's readiness to host an Asia-Pacific ministerial-level urban conference, with Adi closely accompanying the mayoral delegation during Joko Widodo's multilateral engagements. Adi left Kenya with the diplomatic rank of counsellor and returned to Jakarta to take up office in the foreign ministry's bureau of human resources.

Winanto returned to overseas service in 2015, being posted to Indonesia's consulate general in New York as an economic consul. He was officially recognized in the position on 9 June 2015. As economic consul, Adi supported efforts for Indonesian SMEs to promote their products in Philadelphia and cities under the jurisdiction of the consulate general. Adi and other businessfigures supported visits from New York investor to Indonesia to encourage investments to lesser known regions. From New York, Adi was promoted to become the secretary (administrative head) of the directorate general of protocol and consular affairs, being inducted for the position on 22 April 2019. He was then transferred to the foreign ministry's secretariat general in November 2020, becoming the head of human resources bureau within the agency for two years. During his last year in office, Winanto was designated as the acting head of the bureau for planning and organization (January–March 2022) and acting chief of the foreign ministry's center for education and training (April–November 2022).

On 15 September 2022, Winanto was installed as Indonesia's consul general in New York. At his inauguration, the foreign minister directed him to advance economic diplomacy, with focus on trade, investment, tourism, and the creative economy, while strengthening socio-cultural relations and maintaining the national image of Indonesia abroad. He arrived in October 2022 and began his duties on 1 November 2022, a day after presenting his exequatur. Winanto was recognized for his efforts in recovering stolen Indonesian artefacts worth 7,8 billion rupiahs from art smuggler Subhash Kapoor in 2024.

On 10 August 2026, Winanto was nominated by President Prabowo Subianto as ambassador to Kuwait. He underwent a parliamentary vetting process by the House of Representative's first commission on 22 September 2026.
