= Mayerfas =

Indonesian diplomat (born 1960)

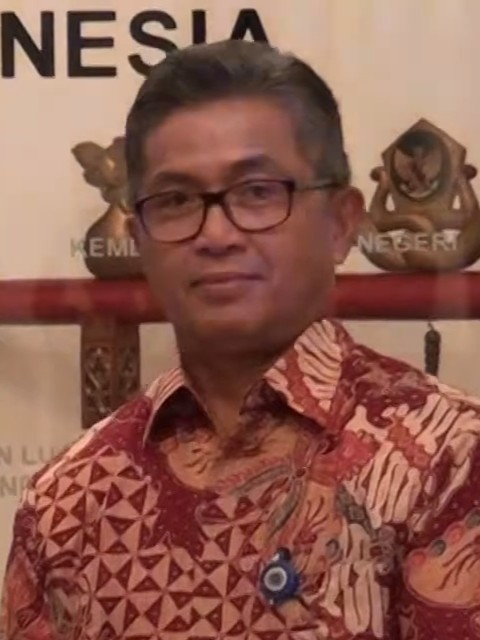

Ambassador of Indonesia to the Netherlands
- In office 14 September 2020 – December 2025
- President: Joko Widodo
- Preceded by: I Gusti Agung Wesaka Puja
- Succeeded by: Mariska Dwianti Dhanutirto (CDA); Laurentius Amrih Jinangkung

Secretary General of the Ministry of Foreign Affairs
- In office 24 May 2017 – 19 June 2020
- Minister: Retno Marsudi
- Preceded by: Kristiarto Legowo
- Succeeded by: Cecep Herawan

Inspector General of the Ministry of Foreign Affairs
- In office 18 March 2016 – 24 May 2017
- Minister: Retno Marsudi
- Preceded by: Ibnu Said; Ferry Adamhar (acting)
- Succeeded by: Rachmat Budiman

Ambassador of Indonesia to Vietnam
- In office 21 December 2011 – March 2016
- President: Susilo Bambang Yudhoyono
- Preceded by: Pitono Purnomo
- Succeeded by: Ibnu Hadi

Personal details
- Born: 10 May 1960 (age 66) Padang Panjang, West Sumatra, Indonesia
- Spouse: Virna Kirana
- Children: 2
- Education: Padjadjaran University (Drs., 1984)

Mayerfas (born 10 May 1960) is an Indonesian career diplomat who is currently serving as ambassador of Indonesia to the Netherlands. A Padjadjaran University graduate, Mayerfas previously held several high-ranking posts within the foreign ministry, including as inspector general and secretary general, and represented Indonesia as ambassador to Vietnam. Throughout his career, he mostly handled economic matters within the foreign ministry and embassies abroad.

== Early life ==
Mayerfas was born in Padang Panjang on 10 May 1960. He graduated in international relations from the Padjadjaran University in 1984.

== Career ==
Upon completing his basic diplomatic education in 1987, Mayerfas began his career within the diplomatic service. He commenced his career as acting head of financial cooperation section with the United States and the 2nd Asia Pacific region within the directorate of investment and finance in 1989. He was then posted to the embassy in Ottawa, where he handled economic matters. By 1994, he returned to Indonesia to serve as the head of UN Trade and Development section within the multilateral economic cooperation directorate.

Mayerfas received his second tour of duty abroad at the permanent mission in Geneva, where he retained his portofolio in economic affairs. He finished his mid-level diplomatic education in 1996, and by 2000 became the deputy director (chief of subdirectorate) for United Nations Economic and Social Council affairs within the multilateral economic cooperation directorate. Following reorganizations within the foreign department in 2002, Mayerfas became the deputy director for the United Nations Economic and Social Commission for Asia and the Pacific within the foreign ministry. On the same year, he completed his senior diplomatic education. He served in the post for about a year before being sent to the consulate general in New York as consul for economic affairs.

Mayerfas undertook his first posting outside of economic affairs upon his appointment as the secretary of the ASEAN cooperation directorate general in 2005. By October 2009, Mayerfas was appointed as the deputy chief of mission at the Indonesia embassy in Beijing, China. He was relieved from his post as directorate general secretary in September 2010. Within a few months after assuming duties as deputy chief of mission, by November that year Mayerfas became the chargé d'affaires ad interim of the embassy following the departure of ambassador Sudrajat. Mayerfas tenure as chargé d'affaires ad interim was extended after Sudrajat's successor, Imron Cotan, was delayed from departing to China due to the-then ongoing investigation on graft charges.

On 21 December 2011, Mayerfas was sworn in as ambassador to Vietnam by President Susilo Bambang Yudhoyono. He introduced himself to the Indonesians in Hanoi on 20 February 2012 and presented his credentials to the president of Vietnam Trương Tấn Sang on 21 February. Two days upon his presentation of credentials, he and other ambassadors to Indonesia's "strategic partner countries" was instructed by President Susilo Bambang Yudhoyono to intensify economic diplomacy and implement signed treaties and MoUs. Shortly afterwards, he met the prime minister of Vietnam Nguyễn Tấn Dũng in March and the chairman of the National Assembly of Vietnam Nguyễn Sinh Hùng in June. As ambassador, Mayerfas worked to attract Vietnamese investment in seafood processing. He also played a role in establishing strategic partnership between the two countries in June 2013 and the Indonesia-Vietnam Friendship Association in 2015. In 2015, he announced plans to export one million tonnes of rice from Vietnam in order to meet Indonesia's domestic demand. At the end of his ambassadorial term, on 25 January 2016 he received the For Peace and Friendship among Nations medal from the Vietnam Union of Friendship Organisations.

After his ambassadorial tenure in Vietnam, Mayerfas became the inspector general of the ministry on 18 March 2016. Mayerfas described the inspectorate general as an agency to resolve internal issues before problems arise and emphasized the need for the inspectorate general to move beyond a strictly consultative role toward a cooperative partnership with other work units to bridge inter-agency institutional gap. He advocated for strengthening the quality and expertise of inspectorate general auditors, particularly in handling complex, evolving problems in foreign representations and addressing technical skills. In regards to gratuity, Mayerfas urged to distinguish between gifts of national interest and personal gain.

About a year after his appointment as inspector general, Mayerfas was reassigned as the foreign ministry's secretary general on 24 May 2017, replacing Kristiarto Legowo who became ambassador to Australia. In 2018, Mayerfas signed a purchase agreement for a new consulate general building in Johor Bahru and with the state labor insurance company regarding the social security for Indonesian migrant workers abroad. During the COVID-19 pandemic in Indonesia, Mayerfas issued an work from home instruction for foreign ministry civil servants, starting 16 March 2020. Mayerfas also announced the ministry's commitment to allocate 110 billion rupiahs (US$ 7543441.57) to handle COVID-19 within the foreign ministry's central office and representatives abroad.

In May 2020, Mayerfas was nominated by President Joko Widodo as ambassador to the Netherlands and permanent representative to the Organisation for the Prohibition of Chemical Weapons. After undergoing an assessment by the House of Representative's first commission on 17 June 2020, he was installed on 14 September. He received his duties from chargé d'affaires ad interim Fikry Cassidy on 2 November and presented his credentials to the king of the Netherlands, Willem-Alexander, on 25 November, and to the Director General of the Organisation for the Prohibition of Chemical Weapons Fernando Arias the next day. At the start of his tenure, Mayerfas launched Ngobras (Ngobrol Bareng Mayerfas, Discussion with Mayerfas), a Zoom-based forum where he mandates embassy staff, including all relevant attachés, to be present to listen and respond directly to WNI's complaints, particularly regarding passport and consular issues. He also pioneered sensitive discussions through webinars on complex topics like domestic violence and immigration, partnering with Dutch legal experts to provide juridical advice to victims. He also expanded the embassy's consular and immigration services outside The Hague and conducted impromptu visits to Indonesian communities and businesses. Mayerfas also oversaw the renovation of the vacant former building of Indonesia's consulate general in Amsterdam into the Indonesia House Amsterdam, which was aimed to showcase Indonesia's cultural potentials and host Indonesian related events. The new building was inaugurated in September 2024 with the presence of foreign minister and former ambassador to the Netherlands Retno Marsudi and the Netherlands director general of culture and media Barbera Wolfensberger. Mayerfas announced his departure in November 2025 at a farewell ceremony hosted by the Dean of the Diplomatic Corps in The Hague, Sahar Ghanem of Yemen. In his farewell remarks, Mayerfas stated that with his five-year long tenure, he is the longest-serving Indonesian ambassador in the Netherlands. He completed his tenure in December 2025 and was replaced by chargé d'affaires ad interim Mariska Dwianti Dhanutirto.

== Personal life ==
Mayerfas is married to Virna Kirana and has two children.
