= Denny Abdi =

Indonesian diplomat (born 1970)

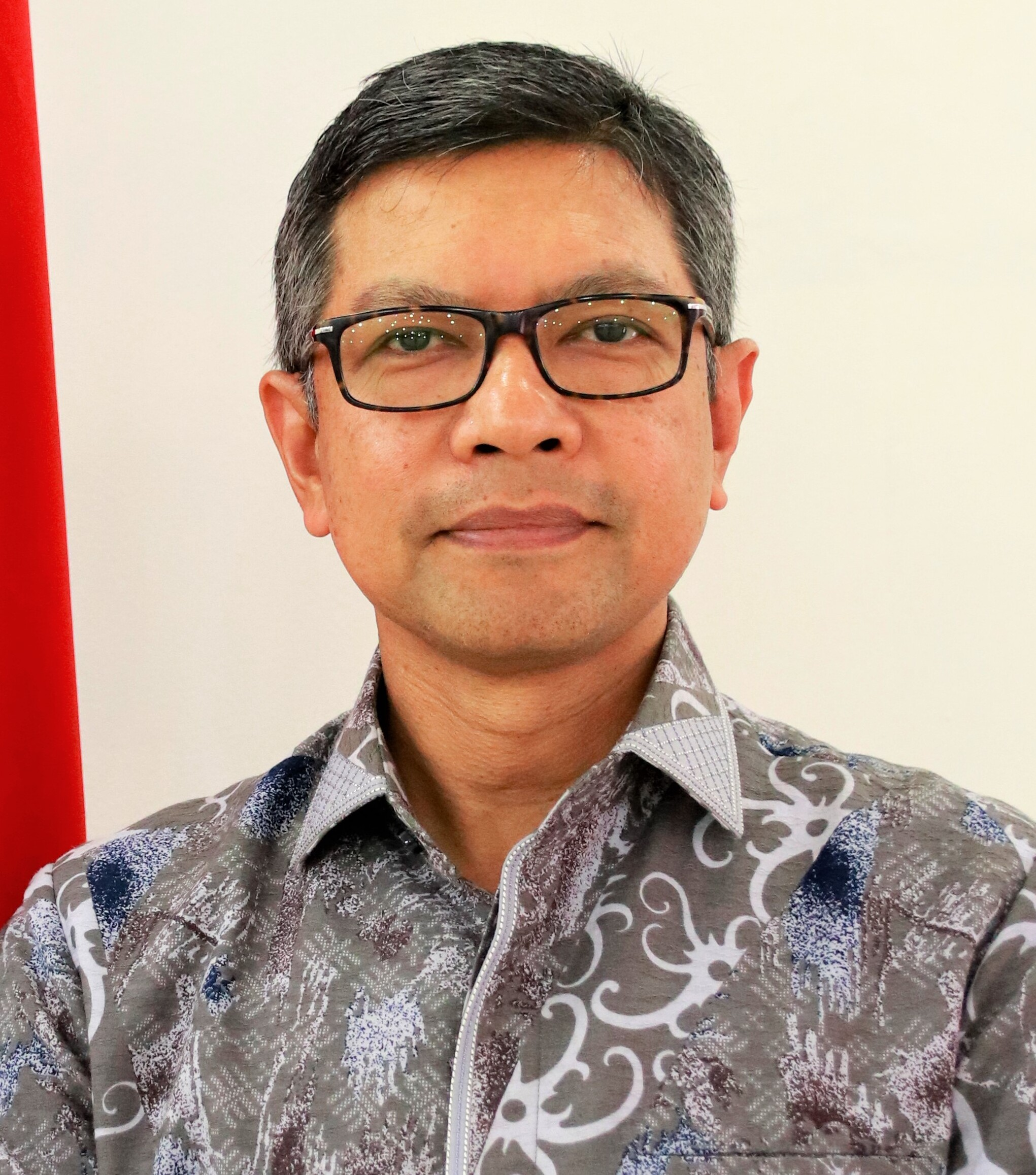

Secretary General of the Ministry of Foreign Affairs
- Incumbent
- Assumed office 17 September 2025
- Preceded by: Cecep Herawan; Heru Hartanto Subolo (acting)

Director General of Multilateral Cooperation
- Acting
- Assumed office 27 April 2026
- Preceded by: Tri Tharyat

Ambassador of Indonesia to Vietnam
- In office 14 September 2020 – November 2025
- President: Joko Widodo; Prabowo Subianto
- Preceded by: Ibnu Hadi
- Succeeded by: Jane Runkat (acting); Adam Mulawarman Tugio

Personal details
- Born: January 12, 1970 (age 56) Sungai Penuh, Jambi, Indonesia
- Spouse: Kristien Abdi
- Education: Andalas University (S.E.); University of Indonesia (M.Si.)

Denny Abdi (born 12 January 1970) is an Indonesian diplomat who is currently serving as the secretary general of the foreign ministry since 2025. Previously, he was the ambassador to Vietnam and director of Southeast Asia.

== Early life and education ==
Born in Sungai Penuh on 12 January 1970, Denny Abdi is of Minang descent. He pursued his basic education at schools held by the Prayoga foundation. He completed primary education at the Agnes Elementary School from 1976 to 1982, followed by the Maria Junior High School, from 1982 to 1985. He attended Don Bosco High School from 1985 to 1988 before studying management at the Faculty of Economics of Andalas University in Padang. During his university years, he was active in student organizations, serving as the secretary general of his faculty's student representative body and chairing his major's student association, in addition to being a member of AIESEC. He earned his bachelor's degree in 1995. Upon being accepted to the foreign department, from 1997 to 1999 Denny pursued master's degree in international relations at the University of Indonesia.

== Career ==
Denny began working on his third year in the university as an assistant site manager for the Ferrostaal Indonesia company in 1991 for two years. He then worked for the Sumatera Jaya Commodities company as an export manager for three years since 1993, representing the company in various export associations. He briefly worked for the Bank Universal in Jakarta as a direct funding officer in 1997 before applying for the foreign department on the same year. He was accepted into the foreign department as a civil servant candidate and undertook basic diplomatic education and a course in French.

Denny began his assignment as a full civil servant upon receiving his master's degree in 1999. His diplomatic postings began with his assignment to the embassy in Canberra with the rank of second secretary from 2001 to 2005. Following this, he served as assistant to the presidential spokesperson for international relations Dino Patti Djalal from 2005 to 2007 and to the foreign ministry secretary general Imron Cotan from 2007 to 2008.

Denny continued his assignment abroad at the permanent mission to the United Nations in New York from 2008 to 2012 with the rank of first secretary, and later counsellor. He was then appointed as deputy director (chief of subdirectorate) for international economic and financial affairs at the foreign ministry's directorate of economic and environmental development from 2012 to 2015 and to the permanent mission in Geneva with the rank of counsellor from 2015 to 2017.

On 26 April 2017, Denny became the inaugural Southeast Asia director in the foreign ministry. Denny managed Indonesia's bilateral relations with all ASEAN member states, Timor Leste, Palau, and the Marshall Islands. In this role, he highlighted the importance of changing the mindset from exporting raw materials to value-added products and emphasized the need for continuous innovation and investment to improve trade and reduce deficits with certain countries like Singapore and Thailand. He also pointed out the significant potential of the digital economy in Southeast Asia, with Indonesia being the largest market.

On 19 March 2020, Denny was nominated by President Joko Widodo as ambassador for Vietnam. Upon passing an assessment by the House of Representative's first commission in June, he was installed as ambassador on 14 September. He presented his credentials to the President of Vietnam Nguyễn Phú Trọng on 17 March 2021. According to Denny, he has no difficulties in adapting to his post in Vietnam due to the similarities in food, atmosphere, and weather with Indonesia. To cater Indonesian food for himself and the guests, Denny brought a cook from Indonesia. During the 2021 SEA Games in Hanoi, the embassy was involved in coordinated transportation, accommodation, meals, training facilities, and interpreters for the Indonesian team and encouraged Indonesian citizens in Hanoi to attend matches and cheer for the athletes, especially on weekends. At the end of his term, he received the Friendship Medal from deputy foreign minister Nguyễn Mạnh Cường on 31 October 2025. Denny announced his departure to the National Assembly Chairman Trần Thanh Mẫn on 30 October and Prime Minister Phạm Minh Chính on 31 October.

On 17 September 2025, Denny was installed as the foreign ministry's secretary general. On 29 November 2025, Denny was elected as the chairman of the Andalas University alumni association with endorsement from foreign minister Sugiono. In February 2026, Denny was appointed as the president of the board of commissioners of the state-owned construction company Hutama Karya. On 27 April 2026, Denny received additional duties as the foreign ministry's director general of multilateral cooperation following the retirement of Tri Tharyat.

== Personal life ==
Denny is married to Kristien Abdi.
