= Eddy Hariyadhi =

Indonesian diplomat (born 1958)

Director General of America and Europe
- In office 6 February 2006 – 24 April 2008
- Preceded by: Arizal Effendi
- Succeeded by: Retno Marsudi

Personal details
- Born: April 23, 1958 (age 68) Yogyakarta, Indonesia
- Spouse: Titimurti Wahyumurwani Hariyadhi
- Children: 3
- Education: Gadjah Mada University; Université Libre de Bruxelles
- Profession: Diplomat

Eddy Suryanto Hariyadhi Dwihardono (born 23 April 1958) is an Indonesian career diplomat who was the director general of America and Europe in the foreign ministry from 2006 to 2008. Prior to his final position in the foreign ministry, he served as the deputy head of mission at Indonesia's embassy in Singapore and at the permanent mission in Geneva.

== Life and education ==
Hariyadhi was born on 23 April 1958 in Yogyakarta, Indonesia. He completed his higher education in his home country before earning advanced credentials abroad. In 1982, he graduated from the Faculty of Social and Political Sciences at Gadjah Mada University in Indonesia. He later pursued post-graduate studies in Europe and obtained a master's degree in International Politics from the Université Libre de Bruxelles in Belgium in 1995. He is married to Titimurti Wahyumurwani Hariyadhi, and the couple has two daughters and one son.

== Diplomatic career ==
Hariyadhi joined the Department of Foreign Affairs as a career diplomat in 1983. Early in his departmental service, he worked as deputy director for ASEAN Economic Cooperation between 1989 and 1993. His first overseas assignment saw him serve as Head of the Economic Sub-Division at the Indonesian Mission to the European Union in Brussels from 1993 to 1997. Upon returning to the ministry headquarters, he was appointed deputy director for Multilateral Economic Cooperation, serving from 1997 to 1999. In addition to his responsibilities within the diplomatic service, Hariyadhi was appointed to key posts within the Office of the President, working as Deputy for Economic Affairs to the Assistant Minister and State Secretary from 1999 to 2001, and subsequently as Head of the Bureau for State Documents and Translations from 2001 to 2002. Returning to direct diplomatic missions, he served as deputy chief of mission at the embassy in Singapore from 2002 to 2003 prior to taking up his posting as deputy permanent representative in Geneva in December 2003. He was the foreign ministry's director general of America and Europe from 6 February 2006 to 24 April 2008.
