= Secretary General of the Ministry of Foreign Affairs (Indonesia) =

- Emblem of the ministry

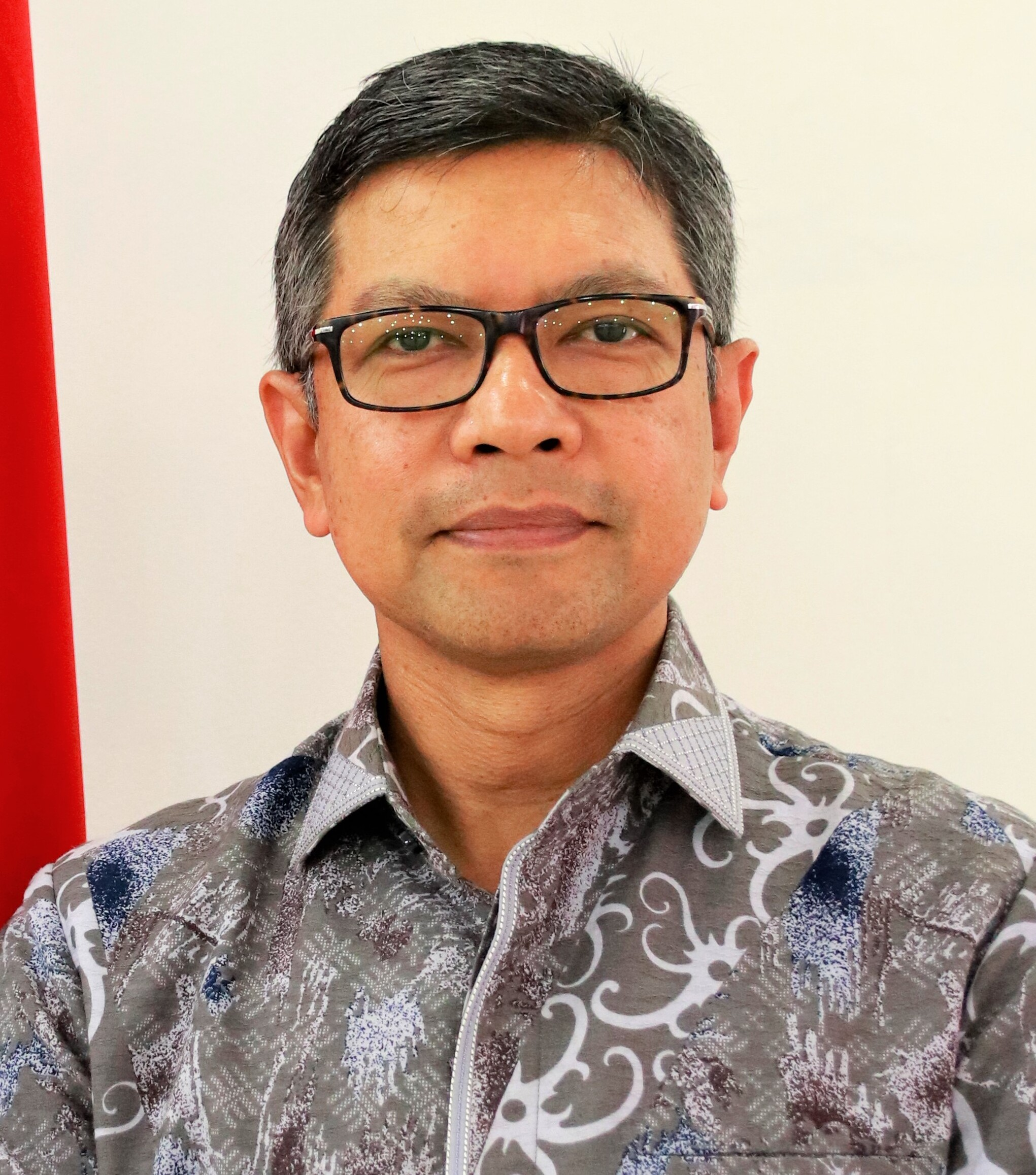
- Incumbent; Denny Abdi since 17 September 2025
- Appointer: Minister of Foreign Affairs
- Inaugural holder: Soedjono (as secretary); Oetojo Ramelan (current form)
- Formation: 8 August 1945 (as secretary); 1946 (current form)

The Secretary General of the Ministry of Foreign Affairs of Indonesia is a position within Indonesia's foreign ministry that oversees the administrative, structural, and personnel matters in the ministry. Directly responsible to the minister, the office is regarded as the most senior among other first-level echelons in the ministry. With an exception of a brief period between 1963 and 1966, the position has been in existence since 1949, making it the oldest senior position within the foreign ministry. The position is held by a career diplomat with the diplomatic rank of ambassador. The current officeholder is Denny Abdi, who has been in office since 17 September 2025.

== Powers and responsibilities ==
According to the Foreign Minister Decree No. 4 of 2025, the most recent decree which regulates the foreign ministry's organization and structure, the secretary general of the ministry of foreign affairs is responsible for coordinating the formulation of foreign policy, implementation of responsibilities, supervision, as well as providing administrative support to units and agencies within the foreign ministry.

== History ==
Two days after the proclamation of Indonesian Independence, on 19 August 1945 President Sukarno issued a decree which appointed Achmad Soebardjo as Indonesia's inaugural foreign minister, effectively forming the foreign ministry. As the ministry had no preceding structure in the prior colonial government, the ministry lacked any sort of organization, and Subardjo had to put up an advertisement to recruit staffers. The first administrative head of the ministry, Sudjono, bear the title of secretary and was appointed in a decree on 8 August 1945.

The post was upgraded to a secretary general sometime in 1946 with Utojo Ramelan being appointed for the post. He never assumed his duties in the post, as in 1947 he was sent to Singapore to head Indonesia's mission there. Pandu Suradhiningrat became the acting general secretary shortly afterwards. At the end of the Indonesian National Revolution in 1949, the Indonesian foreign ministry returned to Jakarta as part of the United States of Indonesia government. Mohammad Ichsan was appointed as the secretary general on 8 August 1949. The federal state soon dissolved and was absorbed by the unitarian Republic of Indonesia, and Ichsan retained the position.

On 12 July 1962, the post, alongside with its counterpart in other ministries, were abolished. The duties of the secretary general were transferred to the assistant foreign minister for organization and administration, with its officeholder being appointed on 1 January 1963. After the fall of Sukarno, the post of secretary general was re-established by President Suharto on 4 August 1966. The nomenclature has remained the same following consecutive reorganizations within the foreign ministry.

== List ==
With the exception of Darma Setiawan, all secretaries general have been ambassadors before or after their appointment.

No	Name	Took office	Left office	Ref.
Secretary of the Ministry of Foreign Affairs (1945–1946)
1	Soedjono	8 August 1945	1946	
Secretary General of the Ministry of Foreign Affairs (1946–1963)
2	Oetojo Ramelan	1946	1947	
act.	Pandu Suradhiningrat	1947	1949	
3	Mohammad Ichsan	8 August 1949	1 April 1951	
4	Darma Setiawan	8 May 1951	7 March 1953†	
act.	Sutan Mohammad Rasjid	27 February 1953	20 March 1954	
5	Ruslan Abdulgani	20 March 1954	24 March 1956	
act.	Subandrio	27 March 1956	10 October 1956	
6	Subandrio	10 October 1956	9 April 1957	
act.	Tamzil	12 April 1957	27 July 1957	
act.	Suwito Kusumowidagdo	27 July 1957	14 February 1958	
7	Suwito Kusumowidagdo	14 February 1958	8 January 1963	
Assistant to the Foreign Minister for Organization and Administration (1963–1966)
8	Sudjarwo Tjondronegoro	8 January 1963	31 June 1965	
9	Ganis Harsono	1 July 1965	21 March 1966	
act.	Nugroho	2 March 1966	3 August 1966	
Secretary General of the Ministry/Department of Foreign Affairs (1966–now)
10	Artati Marzuki-Sudirdjo	4 August 1966	6 March 1972	
11	Ashari Danudirdjo	6 March 1972	27 December 1977	
12	B. Sjahabuddin Arifin	27 December 1977	23 October 1981	
13	Soedarmono	23 October 1981	20 July 1988	
14	Soewarno Danoesoetedjo	20 July 1988	23 May 1995	
15	Abdul Irsan	23 May 1995	30 November 1998	
16	Rahardjo Jamtomo	30 November 1998	3 November 2000	
17	Arizal Effendi	3 November 2000	3 May 2002	
18	Sudjadnan Parnohadiningrat	3 May 2002	16 January 2006	
19	Imron Cotan	16 February 2006	July 2010	
act.	Triyono Wibowo	July 2010	18 October 2010	
20	Budi Bowoleksono	18 October 2010	23 April 2014	
21	Kristiarto Legowo	23 April 2014	24 May 2017	
22	Mayerfas	24 May 2017	19 June 2020	
23	Cecep Herawan	19 June 2020	24 July 2025	
act.	Heru Hartanto Subolo	24 July 2025	17 September 2025	
24	Denny Abdi	17 September 2025	incumbent	
