= Nugroho (diplomat) =

Indonesian diplomat (1920–1984)

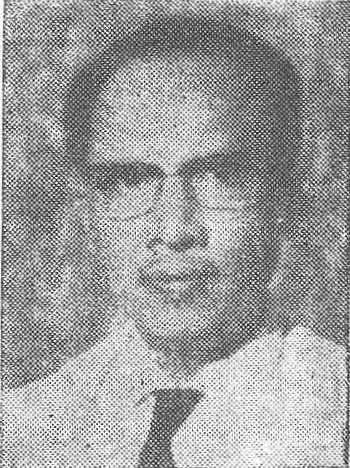

Ambassador of Indonesia to North Vietnam
- In office 13 May 1967 – March 1970
- Preceded by: Soekrisno
- Succeeded by: Usep Ranawidjaja

Assistant Foreign Minister for Organization and Administration
- Acting
- In office 2 March 1966 – 3 August 1966
- Preceded by: Ganis Harsono
- Succeeded by: Artati Marzuki-Sudirdjo (as Secretary General)

Personal details
- Born: 7 July 1920 Mojokerto, East Java, Dutch East Indies
- Died: 18 February 1984 (aged 63) Jakarta, Indonesia
- Children: 3
- Education: Rechtshoogeschool te Batavia; Leiden University

Nugroho (7 July 1920 – 18 February 1984) was an Indonesian diplomat and official who served as Indonesia's ambassador to North Vietnam from 1967 to 1970. A career foreign service officer, Nugroho had been posted both at home and overseas, including as deputy ambassador in Washington, director for UN, director for Africa and Middle East, and acting assistant foreign minister for organization and administration.

== Early life and education ==
Nugroho was born on 7 July 1920 in Mojokerto. He completed middle school (HBS, Hogere Burgerschool) in Semarang, where according to his colleague Ashari Danudirdjo he obtained full marks in Dutch language lesson. He has a degree in law from the Rechtshoogeschool te Batavia (now the University of Indonesia) and Leiden University. He was also educated at the University College London.

== Diplomatic career ==
During the Japanese occupation of the Dutch East Indies, Nugroho worked as the chief of the tax office within the finance department. After the proclamation of Indonesian Independence, Nugroho headed the foreign section of the information ministry until 1947, when he was reassigned to the cabinet's office. He joined the foreign ministry at the end of the Indonesian National Revolution and was sent to London as the Indonesian embassy's first wave of staffs alongside with ambassador Subandrio and military attaché Dahlan Djambek on 23 March 1950. Nugroho was the second most senior diplomat in the embassy for a while until counsellor Sudjarwo Tjondronegoro joined, which relegated him to third-in-line on the embassy.

Nugroho was recalled in 1953 for a posting as chief of West European section of the foreign ministry for two years. Aside from his diplomatic duties, he also taught in universities and colleges. He was also double hatted to head the Bandung Conference secretariat on his last year. Following a brief stint in the Hague with the diplomatic rank of minister counsellor from 1955 to 1956, he was reassigned to Washington, D.C. Nugroho was the embassy's second-ranked official from 1956 to 1962 with the diplomatic rank of minister counsellor, and later, minister. For a few months between 1 September 1960 and 17 April 1961, Nugroho was the embassy's chargé d'affaires ad interim.

Nugroho returned to Indonesia for his appointment as the director for United Nations affairs from 1962 to 1965. After Indonesia withdrew from the United Nations and its related agencies, the directorate was renamed to the directorate for international cooperation, and Nugroho was reassigned as director for Africa and Middle East until 1966. For a brief period between 2 March to 3 August 1966, Nugroho was the acting assistant foreign minister for organization and administration. The post was abolished in light of government reorganizations conducted by the-then new president Suharto and its functions were transferred to the secretary general of the ministry.

Nugroho became Indonesia's ambassador to North Vietnam on 13 May 1967, officially beginning his duties in August that year. At the time of his arrival, the U.S. bombardment of Hanoi was at its peak, with a few bombs exploded near the embassy. Nugroho dismissed claims that the bombings were random, explaining that the bombs veered off target due to high speeds or intense air defenses. Nugroho advised against admitting Vietnam into ASEAN, citing attacks by Vietnam against the organization and the need for an internal consolidation by its member states. He stepped down at his own behest in March 1970 and retired from the foreign ministry shortly after. Upon retiring, he worked as a corporate lawyer, and later as member of the board of directors of Coca-Cola Indonesia.

== Personal life ==
Nugroho is married, and at the time of his death had three children along four grandchildren.

Nugroho died en route to the Pelni Hospital on 18 February 1984 after suffering from a heart attack. His body was interred at the Karet Public Cemetery.
