= Kristiarto Legowo =

Indonesian diplomat

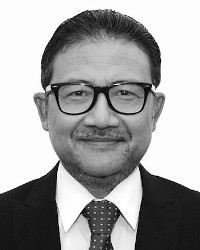

23rd Ambassador of Indonesia to Australia
- In office 27 June 2017 – October 2021
- President: Joko Widodo
- Preceded by: Nadjib Riphat Kesoema
- Succeeded by: Siswo Pramono

Secretary General of the Ministry of Foreign Affairs
- In office 23 April 2014 – 24 May 2017
- Preceded by: Budi Bowoleksono
- Succeeded by: Mayerfas

Ambassador of Indonesia to the Philippines
- In office 21 January 2010 – 14 February 2014
- President: Susilo Bambang Yudhoyono
- Preceded by: Irzan Tanjung
- Succeeded by: Johny Lumintang

Chief of Staff to the Foreign Minister
- In office 5 January 2007 – 14 April 2008
- Preceded by: Desra Percaya
- Succeeded by: Teuku Faizasyah

Personal details
- Born: Yohanes Kristiarto Soeryo Legowo; 27 December 1962 (age 63) Magelang, Central Java, Indonesia
- Spouse: Caecilia (m. 1994)
- Children: Two daughters, one son
- Education: Gadjah Mada University
- Profession: Diplomat

Yohanes Kristiarto Soeryo Legowo, commonly known as Kristiarto Legowo (born 27 December 1962 in Magelang, Central Java) is an Indonesian diplomat who served as Ambassador for the Republic of Indonesia to Australia from 2017 to 2021. During his posting, he held simultaneously the position of Indonesian Ambassador to the Republic of Vanuatu. He was succeeded as Ambassador for Indonesia to Australia by Siswo Pramono.

== Background ==
Kristiarto Legowo's father, Soeryo, was a teacher. Kristarto was the youngest child in a family of ten children. His parents included Legowo as part of his name because there were difficulties during his birth. In Javanese, a widely used language in the Magelang area, legowo describes the feeling of great relief after a difficulty has been overcome. The story that he recounts is that his mother fainted and fell in church shortly before he was born, and the accident required stitches on her neck and triggered contractions. Kristiarto was born two days later, around a week before the due date.

== Education ==
Kristarto originally hoped to become a pilot. However, he wore glasses so this was not possible. Instead, after finishing high school, he decided to continue his studies at Gadjah Mada University, one of Indonesia's leading universities, in Yogyakarta nearby to Magelang. He began his studies at Gadjah Mada University in 1981, entering the Faculty of Politics and Social Sciences majoring in international relations. He completed the full course in the Faculty, graduating with a doctorandus degree, in 1986.

== Career ==
Kristiarto was accepted as a young staffer into the Ministry of Foreign Affairs in Jakarta. He began work in the Ministry in 1987 and subsequently, to gain professional experience, moved through various positions in the Ministry. In January 2007, he was promoted to the senior rank of Echelon II. As a career diplomat, Kristiarto has held a series of positions within the Ministry:

- 2000–2004: Director for Public Diplomacy
- 2007–2008: Chief Staff and Spokesperson for Foreign Minister Hassan Wirajuda
- 2008–2010: Director for East Asian and Pacific Affairs
- 2014–2017: Secretary General of the Ministry

Before his posting as ambassador to Australia, Kristiarto's overseas assignments included positions in Europe, the United States and Asia:

- 1990–1994: Indonesian ambassador to the Holy See in the Vatican
- 1996–2000: Indonesia's Permanent Mission to the United Nations in New York
- 2004–2007: Deputy Head of Mission in Canberra, Australia
- 2010–2013: Ambassador to the Philippines.

After his return to Jakarta from the Philippines, Kristiarto was appointed to the position of Secretary-General in the Ministry of Foreign Affairs. In this position, on occasion he found it necessary to defend the processes of reform in the Ministry when criticisms appeared in the Indonesian media.

Kristiarto was nominated as a candidate for the position of Indonesian Ambassador to Australia by President Joko Widodo in late 2016. After approval of his nomination by the Foreign Affairs Committee of the Indonesian Parliament, he arrived to take up his post as Ambassador of Indonesia to Australia in early June 2017. He presented his credentials to the Australian Governor-General Sir Peter Cosgrove in Canberra on 27 June.

== Family ==
His first posting as an Indonesian diplomat was to the Vatican in Rome. During the posting, Kristiarto met an Indonesian student, Caecilia, studying at Sapienza University. They married in Indonesia in 1994 and have three children, two daughters and a son.
