= Cecep Herawan =

Indonesian diplomat (born 1966)

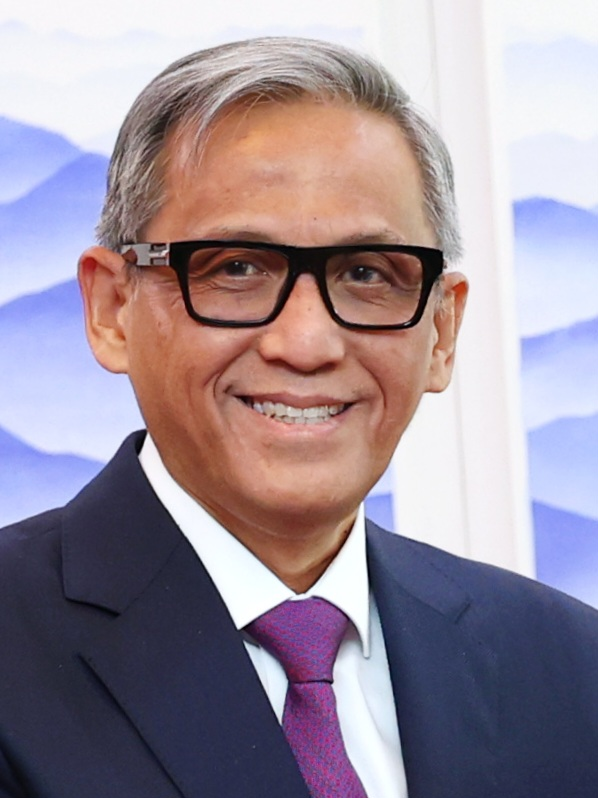
- Cecep Herawan in 2025

Ambassador of Indonesia to South Korea
- Incumbent
- Assumed office 24 March 2025
- President: Prabowo Subianto
- Preceded by: Gandi Sulistiyanto

Secretary General of the Ministry of Foreign Affairs
- In office 19 June 2020 – 24 July 2025
- Preceded by: Mayerfas
- Succeeded by: Heru Hartanto Subolo (acting); Denny Abdi

Director General for Information and Public Diplomacy
- In office 15 September 2017 – 19 June 2020
- Preceded by: Esti Andayani; Niniek Kun Naryatie (acting)
- Succeeded by: Teuku Faizasyah

Personal details
- Born: October 15, 1966 (age 59) Jakarta, Indonesia
- Education: Padjadjaran University (S.H.); University of Indonesia (M.H.)

Cecep Herawan (born 15 October 1966) is an Indonesian diplomat who is currently serving as ambassador to South Korea since 2025. Previously, Cecep was the foreign ministry's director general for information and public diplomacy from 2017 to 2020 and secretary general from 2020 to 2025.

== Early life and education ==
Born on 15 October 1966 in Jakarta, Cecep completed his law education at the Padjadjaran University, which he started in 1985. He later received a master's degree on the same subject from the University of Indonesia.

== Career ==
Cecep began his diplomatic career in March 1993. In April 1997, he was assigned to the economic section of the Indonesian embassy in New York with the rank of third secretary. He was involved in the United Nations General Assembly Fifth Committee, where he represented Indonesia and the Group of 77 and China on sessions regarding gratis personnel, code of conduct, and the United Nations Mission in East Timor. Cecep submitted a draft resolution on the financing of UNIFIL in May 1998. He left his posting in early 2001 and returned to the foreign ministry.

After several years in Indonesia, he was posted to the permanent representative in Geneva with the rank of second secretary, serving until 2008. He was promoted to first secretary after several months and represented Indonesia at the UN Trade and Development conferences. On 19 January 2008, Cecep received the Ksatria Bakti Husada Arutala award from the health minister for his role challenging the unfair virus sharing system under WHO's Global Influenza Surveillance Network (GISN), which was considered unequitable for developing nations such as Indonesia.

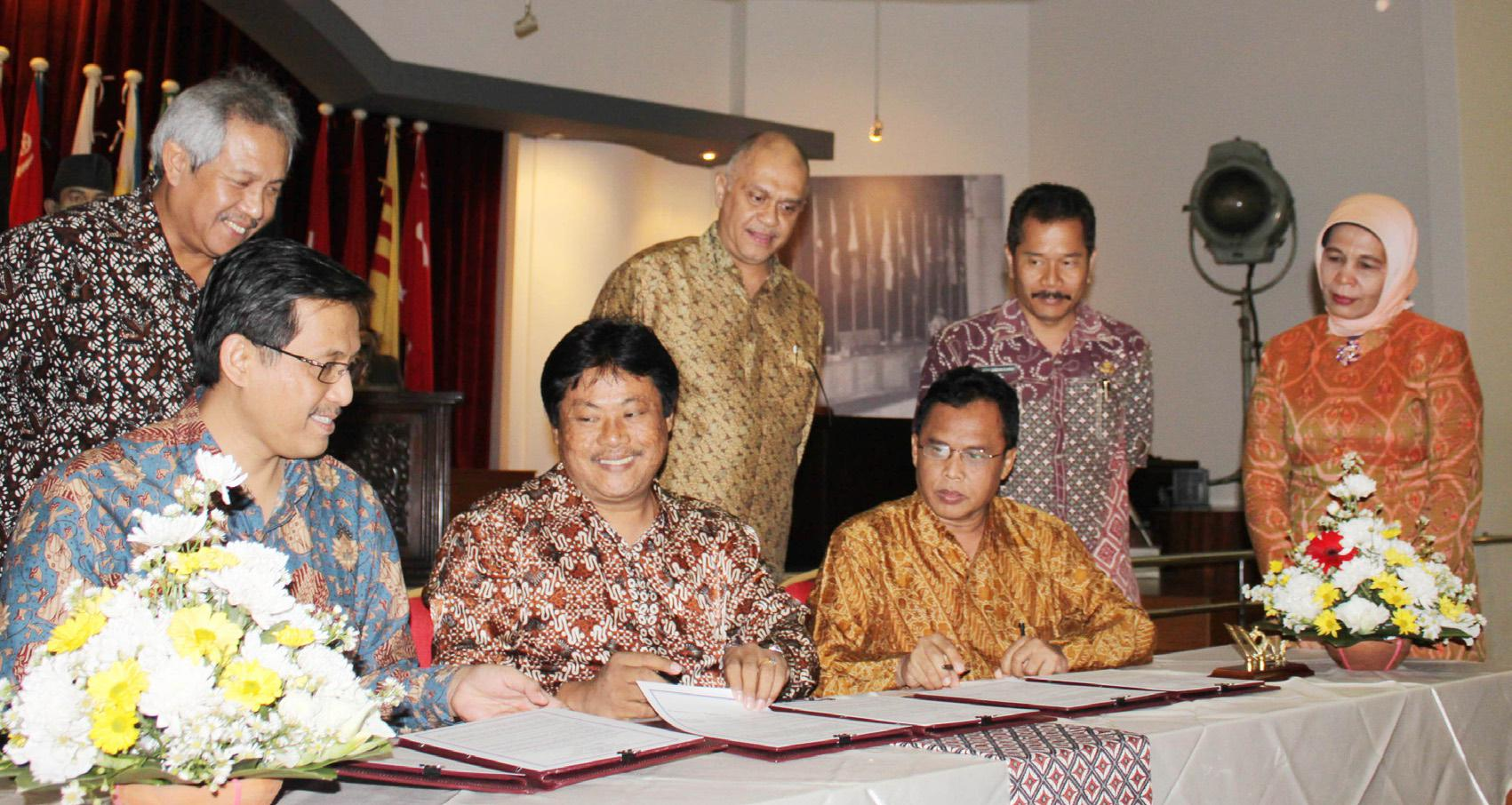
Cecep (left) at the handover of the Merdeka Building from the People's Consultative Assembly to the foreign ministry in 2011.

Afterwards, he became the deputy director (chief of subdirectorate) for environment affairs within the foreign ministry's directorate for economic and environment development and the chief of the foreign ministry's equipment bureau. During his tenure as equipment chief, in 2011 he signed the transfer of ownership of the Merdeka Building from the People's Consultative Assembly to the foreign ministry. In 2014, Cecep became the deputy chief of mission of the embassy in Seoul. During his tenure, he was involved in implementing ambassador John Prasetyo's community-based protection and service to enable Indonesian communities in South Korea to act as extensions of the embassy by providing assistance to fellow Indonesians with smaller issues.

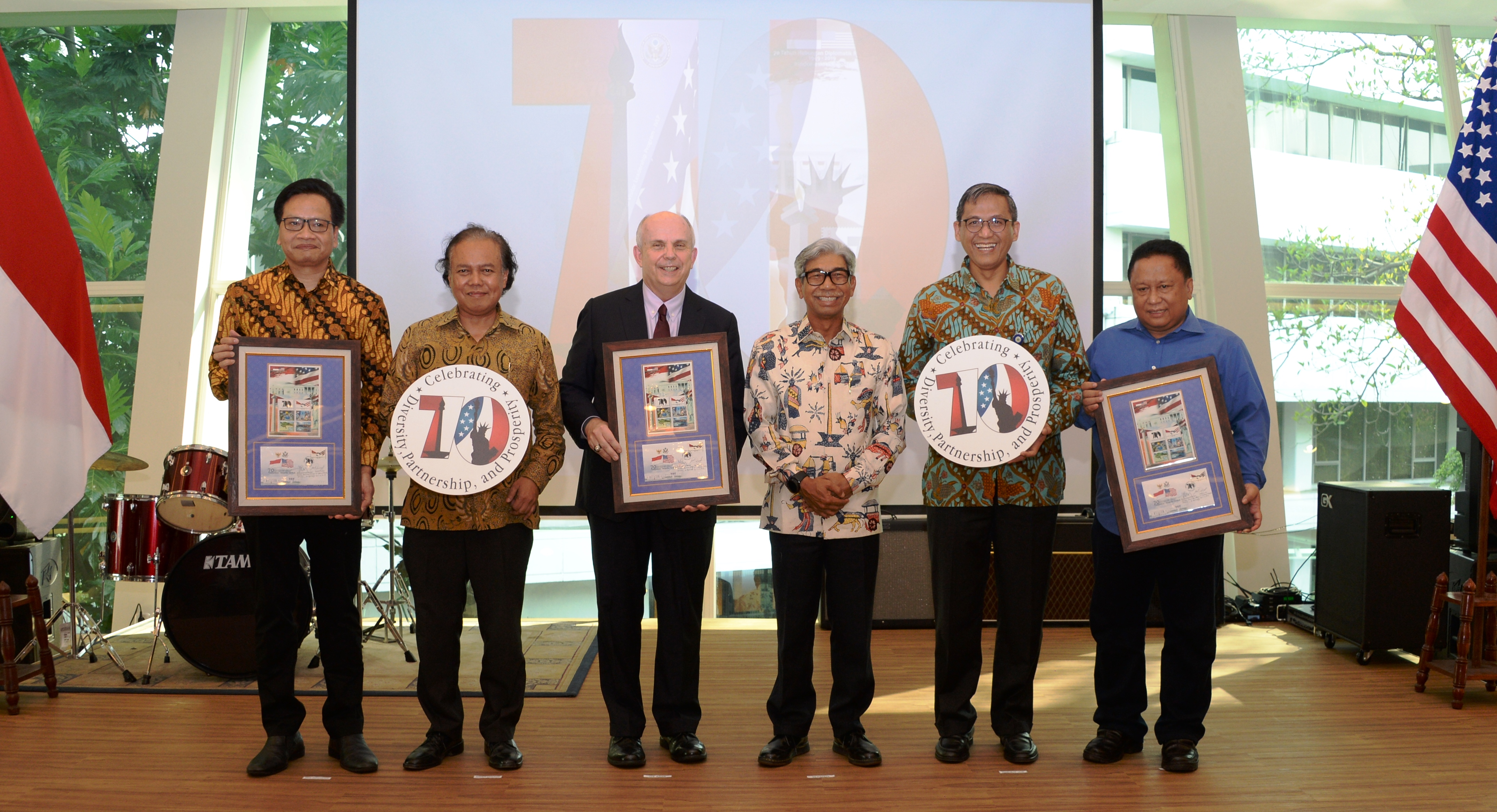
Cecep (second from right) at the launching of the 70th anniversary of Indonesia-US diplomatic relations commemorative stamp, 2019

Cecep ended his tenure in Seoul with his appointment as the director general for information and public diplomacy on 15 September 2017, replacing acting director general Niniek Kun Naryatie. During 2018 Annual Press Statement by the Foreign Minister, Cecep encouraged ministry staff to wear batik featuring one of four symbolic motifs: Parang, Truntum, Sidomukti, or Sekarjagad, which represents Indonesia's diplomatic priorities and cultural identity. The directorate general held its inaugural Regional Conference on Digital Diplomacy in 2019 and was involved in proposing Ambon, the capital of the Maluku Province, as UNESCO's World Music City. Cecep also supported gastrodiplomacy as Indonesia's soft power projection.

On 19 June 2020, Cecep became the secretary general of the foreign ministry. He was reappointed to the position on 18 August 2021 following reorganizations within its organization. During his tenure, Cecep signed an agreement deal providing US$1 million to the Coalition for Epidemic Preparedness Innovations in 2020 and with Pertamina on foreign market expansion in 2021. On 12 June 2021, Cecep became a member of the board of commissioners of the Gresik petrochemical factory.

In August 2024, President Joko Widodo nominated Cecep as Indonesia's ambassador to South Korea. He passed a fit and proper test held by the House of Representatives' first commission in September that year and was installed by President Prabowo Subianto on 24 March 2025. At his inauguration, Cecep stated his intention on resolving the alleged data theft involving Indonesian engineers working on the KF-21 fighter jet project. Cecep presented his credentials to President of South Korea Lee Jae Myung on 2 September 2025.

== Personal life ==
Cecep is married to Widiah G. R. Herawan.
