= Mahendra Siregar =

Indonesian politician

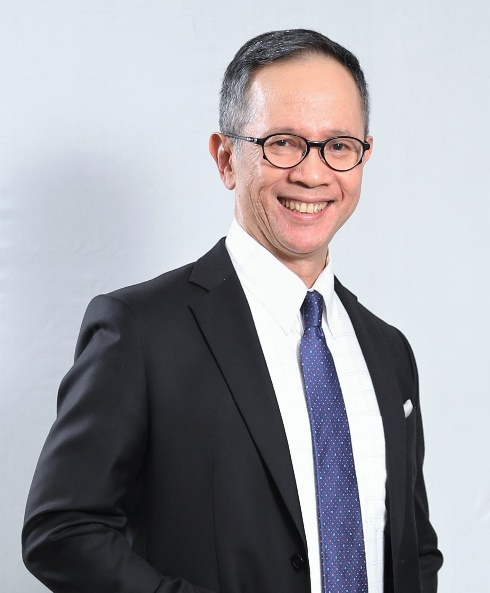

Chief of Financial Services Authority
- In office 20 July 2022 – 30 January 2026
- President: Joko Widodo
- Preceded by: Wimboh Santoso
- Succeeded by: TBD

Indonesian Ambassador to the United States
- In office 8 April 2019 – 25 October 2019
- President: Joko Widodo
- Preceded by: Budi Bowoleksono
- Succeeded by: Muhammad Lutfi

Deputy Foreign Minister of Indonesia
- In office 25 October 2019 – 19 July 2022
- President: Joko Widodo
- Preceded by: Abdurrahman Mohammad Fachir
- Succeeded by: Pahala Mansury

Personal details
- Born: 17 October 1962 (age 63) Jakarta, Indonesia
- Spouse: Ita Siregar
- Education: University of Indonesia; Monash University
- Occupation: Diplomat and economist

Mahendra Siregar (Note: It is generally the practice in Indonesia to refer to a person using their first name and the person should be referred to by the first name, Mahendra) (born 17 October 1962 in Jakarta) is an Indonesian politician and diplomat who most recently served as the chief of the Financial Services Authority (OJK) of Indonesia. Previously, he was appointed as Ambassador to the US by President Joko Widodo in 2018, serving from April to October 2019. He was then appointed as the deputy minister of foreign affairs on 25 October 2019, supporting Indonesian foreign minister Retno Marsudi in the second Jokowi cabinet. Mahendra is a respected economist in Indonesia who has held various senior positions within the Indonesian bureaucracy.

Mahendra resigned from his post at the Financial Services Authority on 30 January 2026 following significant concerns raised by MSCI regarding unclear share ownership and potential coordinated trading activity on the Indonesia Stock Exchange.

== Early life ==
Mahendra Siregar's family background is Sumatran. His parents are from the Angkola group, part of the Batak people from South Tapanuli in North Sumatra, and the Minangkabau group in West Sumatra. He is married to Ita Siregar.

Mahendra undertook tertiary education, first, at the University of Indonesia in Jakarta. He later graduated with a Masters in Economics from Monash University in Melbourne, Australia, in 1991.

== Work with government ==
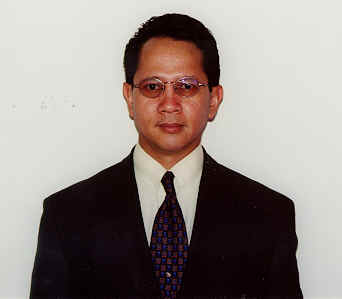
Mahendra Siregar in 2000, during his posting in Washington D.C.

A summary of Mahendra Siregar's work with the government is as follows:

- 1986: joined the Indonesian Department of Foreign Affairs as a young staff member.
- 1992–1995: Third Secretary (economic), Indonesian Embassy, London, United Kingdom.
- 1998–2001: Information Counsellor, Indonesian Embassy, Washington DC, United States.
- 2001: Staff member, Coordinating Ministry for Economic Affairs, Jakarta, including duties as a special assistant to Dorodjatun Kuntjoro-Jakti, Coordinating Minister for Economic Affairs in the Megawati administration.
- 2005–2009: Deputy Minister for international economic and financial relations, Coordinating Ministry for Economics and Finance, working successively with ministers Aburizal Bakrie (2005–2006), Boediono (2006–2008), and Sri Mulyani Indrawati (2008–2009) who were Coordinating Ministers for Economic Affairs during this period.
- 2009: Deputy Minister for Trade, working with Mari Elka Pangestu, Minister for Trade.
- 2011–2013: Deputy Minister for Finance.
- 2013–2015: Chair, Indonesian Investment Coordinating Board (Badan Koordinasi Penanaman Modal, or BKPM).
- 2018: Appointed Indonesian ambassador to the United States.
- 2019: Deputy minister of foreign affairs supporting Indonesian foreign minister Retno Marsudi.

Following Mahendra's appointment as deputy minister of foreign affairs in October 2019, it was reported that President Jokowi had indicated that he should take on two main tasks: concluding trade negotiations with the United States on specific matters and taking steps to support the Indonesian palm oil industry. Outlining his duties to the media, Mahendra noted a US review of the Generalized System of Preferences was underway and that Indonesia's involvement would need immediate attention. A successful outcome, he observed, could lead to a doubling of Indonesia's trade with the US within five years. Mahendra said that his second main task would focus on "neutralizing the EU's unfriendly position" on the palm oil industry in Indonesia. Earlier in the year, in March, the EU had decided to phase out the use of palm oil by 2030 because of deforestation concerns. Indonesia planned to engage the EU on the policy.

A short time later, in early December 2019, Mahendra took steps to voice concern on behalf of Indonesia about the way that the narrative about palm oil issues in Indonesia was presented in the international media. In response to a report aired on international CNN reports entitled "Borneo is burning: How the world's demand for palm oil is driving deforestation in Indonesia", Mahendra claimed that the report was not constructive and provided a false narrative. He noted that the Indonesian government was taking steps to address the problem and that the Indonesian government's efforts should receive international support.

On 30 January 2026, Mahendra resigned together with two other senior OJK officials days after MSCI raised concerns over "opacity in shareholding structures" and "possible co-ordinated trading behaviour" on the Indonesia Stock Exchange, warning that they might have to downgrade Indonesia to frontier market status and triggering a broad market selloff.

== Other positions ==
Other positions that have been held by Mahendra Siregar include the following:

- 2003–2008: Commissioner of the state-owned PT Dirgantara Indonesia.
- 2007–2009: Indonesian representative at the UN FCCC (UN Framework Convention on Climate Change).
- 2008–2009: Commissioner of PT Aneka Tambang, a mining company.
- 2009–2010: Chair and CEO of the newly-created Indonesia Eximbank.
- 2010: Indonesian sherpa to G20 meetings appointed by president Susilo Bambang Yudhoyono.
- 2012: President commissioner of state-owned cement firm PT Semen Gresik.
- 2016: Executive director of the council for Palm Oil Producing Countries.
- 2016: Non-executive director and chair, Bank Mandiri (Europe) Ltd
