= Wardana =

Indonesian diplomat (1954–2024)

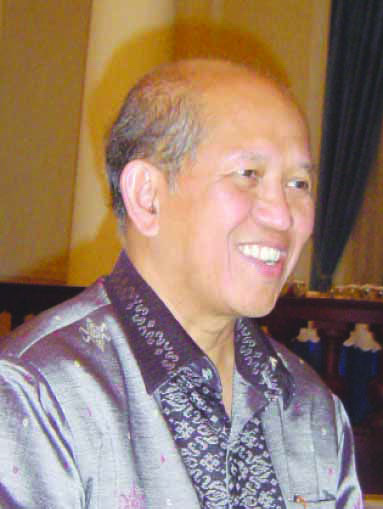
- Wardana in 2009

Vice Minister of Foreign Affairs
- In office 19 October 2011 – 14 July 2014
- President: Susilo Bambang Yudhoyono
- Minister: Marty Natalegawa
- Preceded by: Triyono Wibowo
- Succeeded by: Dino Patti Djalal

Ambassador of Indonesia to Turkey
- In office 15 October 2014 – 22 December 2018
- President: Susilo Bambang Yudhoyono; Joko Widodo
- Preceded by: Nahari Agustini
- Succeeded by: Lalu Muhamad Iqbal

Ambassador of Indonesia to Singapore
- In office 18 October 2006 – May 2011
- President: Susilo Bambang Yudhoyono
- Preceded by: Mochamad Slamet Hidayat
- Succeeded by: Andri Hadi

Chief of Foreign Ministry Policy Assessment and Development Agency
- In office 12 May 2011 – 12 April 2012
- Preceded by: Artauli Tobing; Andri Hadi (acting)
- Succeeded by: Pitono Purnomo

Personal details
- Born: Wardana; 23 June 1954 Klaten, Central Java, Indonesia
- Died: 19 November 2024 (aged 70) Jakarta, Indonesia
- Resting place: Kalibata Heroes' Cemetery
- Spouse: Masrifah
- Children: 2
- Education: Diponegoro University
- Awards: Star of Mahaputera (3rd Class)

Wardana bin Romli Hadiwijoyo (23 June 1954 – 19 November 2024) was an Indonesian diplomat who was best known for his role as Indonesia's deputy foreign minister from 2011 to 2014. Wardana served as ambassador to Singapore from 2006 to 2011 and to Turkey from 2014 to 2019.

== Early life and education ==
Wardana was born on 23 June 1954 in Klaten, a regency within the province of Central Java. Wardana pursued higher education at the social and political sciences faculty of the Central Java-based Diponegoro University, where he graduated with a doctorandus in 1980. He then successfully applied for the foreign department and completed his basic diplomatic education in 1982.

== Diplomatic career ==
=== Early assignments ===
Wardana's career in the foreign department began with an initial posting as the subsection head at the general affairs bureau of the foreign department's secretariat general in 1983. A year later, he underwent an internship program at the mission to the United Nations in New York with the rank of attaché. By 1985, he became a vice consul at the consulate general in San Francisco, with his recognition from the State Department on 13 January 1986.

After roughly four years taking on various roles at diplomatic missions in the United States, Wardana returned home with a promotion as a section chief at the directorate of foreign trade relations in 1988. Three years into the position, he was sent to the economic section of Indonesia's permanent mission in Geneva with the rank of first secretary from 1991 to 1995. After a three-year stint as the deputy director within the directorate of multilateral economic cooperation from 1995 to 1998, he was sent to head the economic section at the embassy in Tokyo with the rank of counsellor, before being promoted to the rank of minister counsellor. He completed his mid-level and advanced diplomatic education in 1997.

In 2002, foreign minister Hassan Wirajuda implemented a total reorganization of the foreign ministry's structure, with the directorate general of politics under the old structure being split into two regional-based directorate generals: America and Europe and the Asia, Pacific, and Africa. Wardana was appointed as the director of South America within the America and Europe directorate general on 3 May 2002. During his tenure, in 2003 Wardana took part in a diplomatic mission to Suriname aimed at intensifying bilateral cooperation between the two countries. Wardana's jurisdiction were later expanded to include Caribbean countries.

=== Ambassador and consul general ===
On 31 August 2004, Wardana became Indonesia's consul general in Sydney, with his exequatur (formal approval) being received on 30 September. In 2005, he participated in the commemoration of the 2002 Bali bombings as a sign of Indonesia's solidarity with the victims. His tenure as consul general ended in November 2006 and he paid a farewell call to the Governor-General of Australia Michael Jeffery on the 7th of that month.

Wardana became the ambassador to Singapore on 18 October 2006. He presented his credentials to president S. R. Nathan on 30 November. During his tenure, he paid a significant attention to the presence of Indonesian migrant workers in the country, with the embassy holding regular training and workshops for Indonesian migrant workers under his leadership. He also regularly met with Indonesian migrant workers in an informal setting every Sundays, during which he received various proposals to improve migrant worker's welfare through alternative education programs and more diverse trainings. Wardana's informal Sunday meetings also sparked the idea for the Indonesian seamen's association in Singapore, which by 2011 has more 16,000 members and received formal recognition from the Singaporean government.

On the occasion of Indonesia's 63rd independence anniversary in 2008, Wardana lauded Singapore as Indonesia's "steady partner in investment, trade and tourism". In 2007, Wardana was summoned by the foreign ministry regarding a statement fisheries minister Freddy Numberi that connected Indonesia's ban on sand exports to Singapore with territorial disputes.

=== Vice foreign minister ===
After five years of service in the country, on 12 May 2011 Wardana was sworn in as the chief of the foreign ministry's policy assessment and development agency. Six months later, on 13 October Wardana was summoned by president Susilo Bambang Yudhoyono at his residence in Cikeas. State secretary minister Sudi Silalahi later confirmed Wardana's appointment as vice foreign minister, with Wardana laying out the president's instruction on solidifying Indonesia's foreign policy profile, implementing international treaties, and promoting Indonesia's foreign economic relations. Wardana was sworn in alongside with twelve other vice ministers on 19 October. In an interview shortly afterwards, Wardana ensured that his duties do not overlap with the foreign minister and emphasized his status as the foreign minister's assistant. Foreign minister Marty Natalegawa noted Wardana's longstanding work relations with him and stated that he was the right figure for internal consolidation.

Wardana's initial assignment was assisting Marty in preparing Indonesia's 2011 chairmanship of the ASEAN. He also participated in several international conferences held in Jakarta, including the 1st session of the Organisation of Islamic Cooperation's Human Rights Commission in February 2012 and the 6th Regional Interfaith Dialogue in March 2012. In 2013, Wardana criticized the poor organization of Indonesia migrant workers recruitment, stating that it mostly happened due to a lack of interagency coordination and the lack of government involvement.

In June 2012, Wardana was questioned by the Corruption Eradication Commission for twelve hours regarding his programs as ambassador to Singapore. Tempo, who reported on the case, stated that he was questioned on the 7th floor, indicating that the case is still under preliminary investigation. Wardana denied any wrongdoings and stated there was no corruption case happening.

In 2013, Wardana represented the foreign ministry in receiving a clean audit opinion from the state audit board, which was an improvement to the 2010 qualified opinion. To retain the clean opinion, Wardana recommended strengthening internal oversight and regularly monitor the ministry's budget implementation list.

Following the Czech's government mosque raid in April 2014 which affected several diplomats in the Indonesian embassy there, Wardana lodged a protest on behalf of the Indonesian government via a diplomatic note and summoned the Czech ambassador to Indonesia. A few months later, Wardana was replaced as vice foreign minister by Dino Patti Djalal on 14 July 2014. For his role as vice foreign minister, on 13 October 2014 Wardana received Indonesia's highest award, the Star of Mahaputera, 3rd class.

=== Ambassador to Turkey ===
After his vice ministerial stint, on 15 October 2014 Wardana became Indonesia's ambassador to Turkey. He presented his credentials to president Recep Tayyip Erdoğan on 23 December that year. Wardana supported the presence of Indonesian students in Turkey and ensured them to stay calm during times of crisis in the country. Wardana also warmly welcomed Turkey's ASEAN partnership, hailing it as a "cooperation that will be mutually beneficial for both Turkey and ASEAN". Wardana's ambassadorial term ended on 22 December 2018. Throughout his term, Wardana paid visits to various Turkish officials, including the Governor of Antalya Muammer Türker and Deputy Minister of Foreign Affairs Naci Koru.

== Personal life ==
Wardana is married to Masrifah and has two children. The Quality Assurance, one of foreign ministry's internal publication, described Wardana as having a baby face.

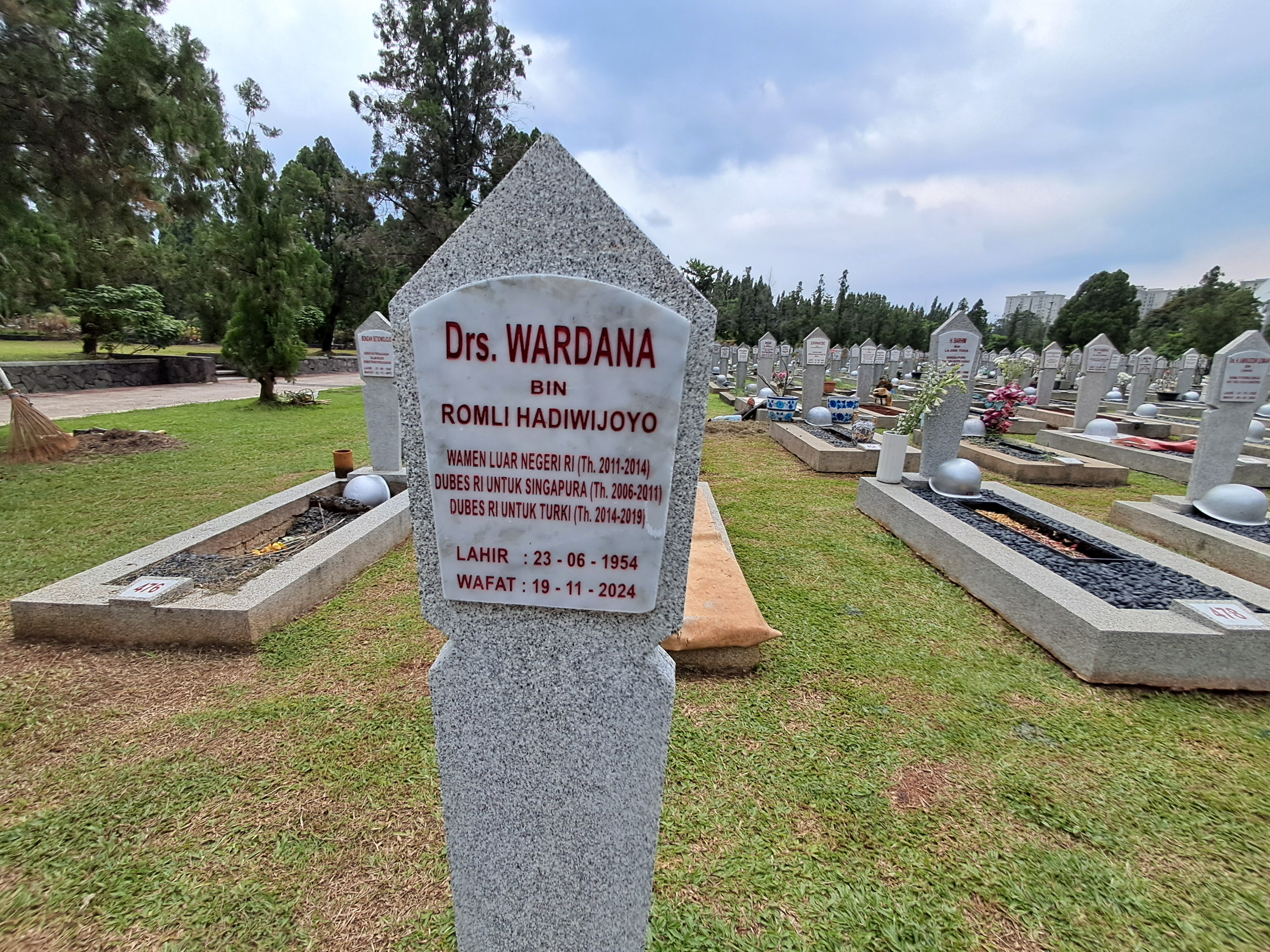
Wardana's gravestone at the Kalibata Heroes' Cemetery.

Wardana died in Jakarta on 19 November 2024 and was buried at the Kalibata Heroes' Cemetery.
