= Budi Bowoleksono =

Indonesian diplomat (born 1959)

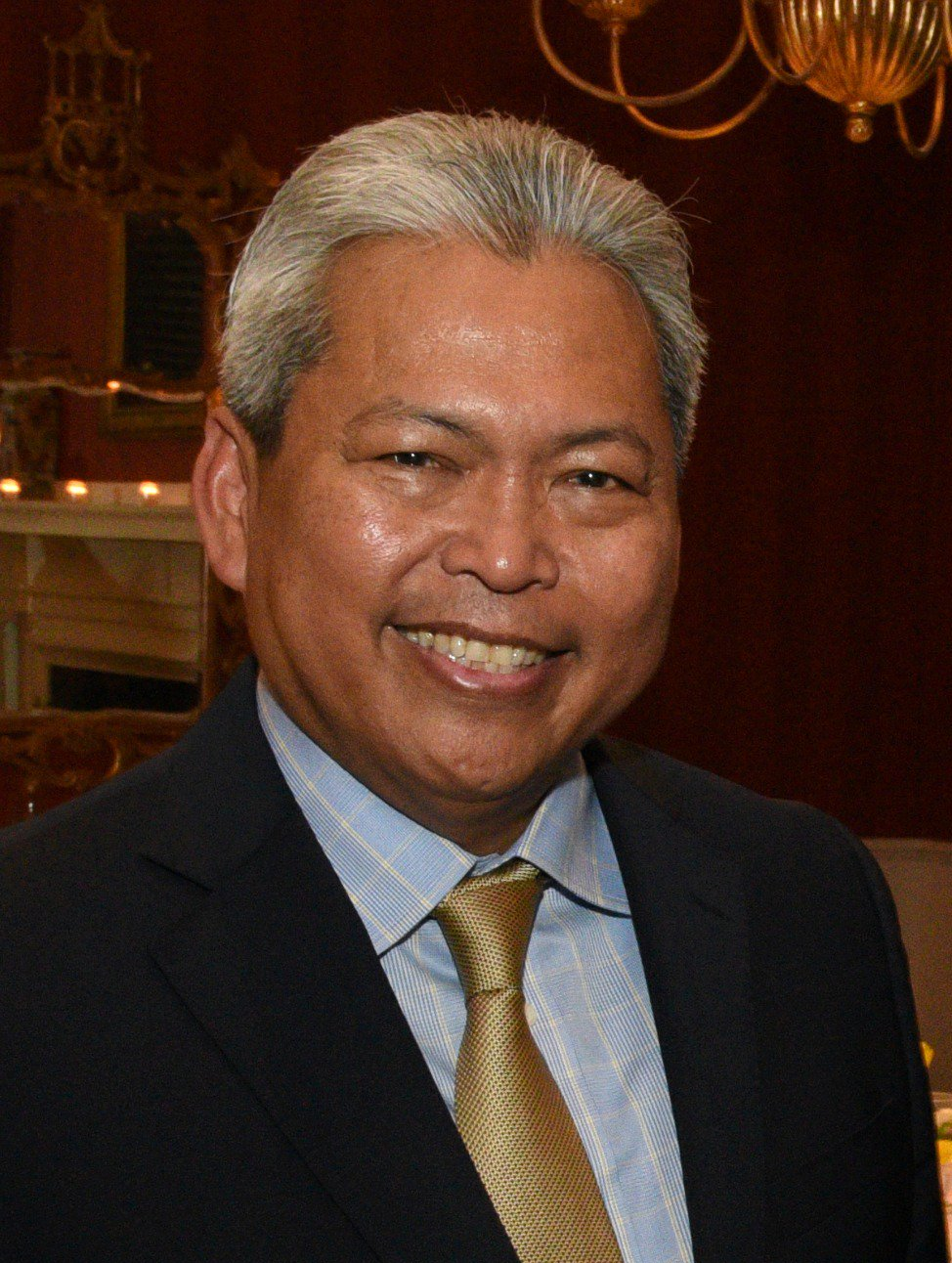
- Bowoleksono in 2019

Ambassador of Indonesia to the United States
- In office 14 February 2014 – 7 January 2019
- President: Susilo Bambang Yudhoyono; Joko Widodo
- Preceded by: Dino Patti Djalal
- Succeeded by: Mahendra Siregar

Secretary General of the Ministry of Foreign Affairs
- In office 18 October 2010 – 14 February 2014
- Preceded by: Imron Cotan; Triyono Wibowo (acting)
- Succeeded by: Kristiarto Legowo

Ambassador to Kenya, Seychelles, Uganda, Mauritius, UNEP, and UN-Habitat
- In office 8 April 2008 – 18 October 2010
- President: Susilo Bambang Yudhoyono
- Preceded by: Djismun Kasri
- Succeeded by: Sunu Mahadi Soemarmo

Personal details
- Born: 29 May 1959 (age 67) Jakarta, Indonesia
- Spouse: Reshanty Tahar
- Children: 1
- Education: Krisnadwipayana University

Budi Bowoleksono (born 29 May 1959) is an Indonesian retired diplomat who served as ambassador to the United States from 2014 to 2019. Previously, he served as ambassador to Kenya from 2008 to 2010 and the foreign ministry's secretary general from 2010 to 2013.

== Early life and education ==
Budi Bowoleksono was born in Jakarta on 29 May 1959. His parents were from Nganjuk, East Java, and his mother did not graduate from elementary school. He studied economics at the Krisnadwipayana University and graduated with a bachelor's degree in 1984. During his time at university, he took part-time jobs before and after classes. He returned home at 1am every day and was taught to cook by his mother, as there was no food for sale during that period of day. He also got inspiration for recipes from local markets. Budi's interest in diplomacy began during his university years with his admiration of foreign minister Adam Malik, which led him to apply to the foreign ministry. He turned down a permanent position at the education ministry where he had been a part-time employee.

== Diplomatic career ==
Budi began his diplomatic career in March 1985 and completed basic diplomatic training in 1986. He was appointed as the acting chief of the East Asia section in the international trade relations directorate in September 1987. After a two-year stint, he was posted at the economic section of the permanent mission to the United Nations in New York, serving with the diplomatic rank of third secretary. He returned to the foreign ministry in August 1993 to serve as the chief of ministerial administration subsection with the general bureau of the foreign ministry's secretariat general.

Budi's career shifted back to multilateral economics in September 1995 with his posting as the chief of the economic subdivision at the permanent mission in Geneva. He was promoted to the diplomatic rank of first secretary in February 1996. Following this, he returned to Jakarta in February 1998 as the chief of the trade and tourism section in the ASEAN National Secretariat's bureau of economics. During this period, he completed his mid-level and senior diplomatic training in 1999 and 2000, respectively. In October 2000, he was assigned to head the economic section of the embassy in Vienna until August 2003, and then briefly as the head of the multilateral politics section until April 2004. During this period, Budi worked to promote investment from Austrian businesspersons in Indonesia.

Budi returned to Jakarta with his appointment as the secretary of the directorate general of multilateral economy, finance, and development on 6 April 2004. About a year later, the foreign ministry underwent major restructuring, and the two multilateral directorates general were merged into a single multillateral directorate general. Budi was appointed as the new secretary of the multilateral directorate general on 26 December 2005.

=== Ambassador to Kenya ===
Budi underwent assessment by the House of Representative's first commission for his nomination as ambassador to Kenya, with concurrent accreditation to Seychelles, Uganda, Mauritius, the United Nations Environment Programme (UNEP), and the United Nations Human Settlements Programme (UN-Habitat) by the president on 26 November 2007. He was sworn in on 8 April 2008 and presented his credentials to the Executive Director of the UN-Habitat Anna Tibaijuka in June 2008, President of Uganda Yoweri Museveni on 23 April 2009, and to the President of Seychelles James Michel on 30 June 2009. During his tenure, Budi represented Indonesia in an agreement between Indonesia and Kenya on archaeological research. As Indonesia's representative to the United Nations Environment Programme, Budi was elected as vice president of the 7th meeting of the Conference of the Parties to the Vienna Convention in 2008 and rapporteur for the 25th session of the UNEP Governing Council/Global Ministerial Environment Forum in 2009.

=== Secretary general of the foreign ministry ===
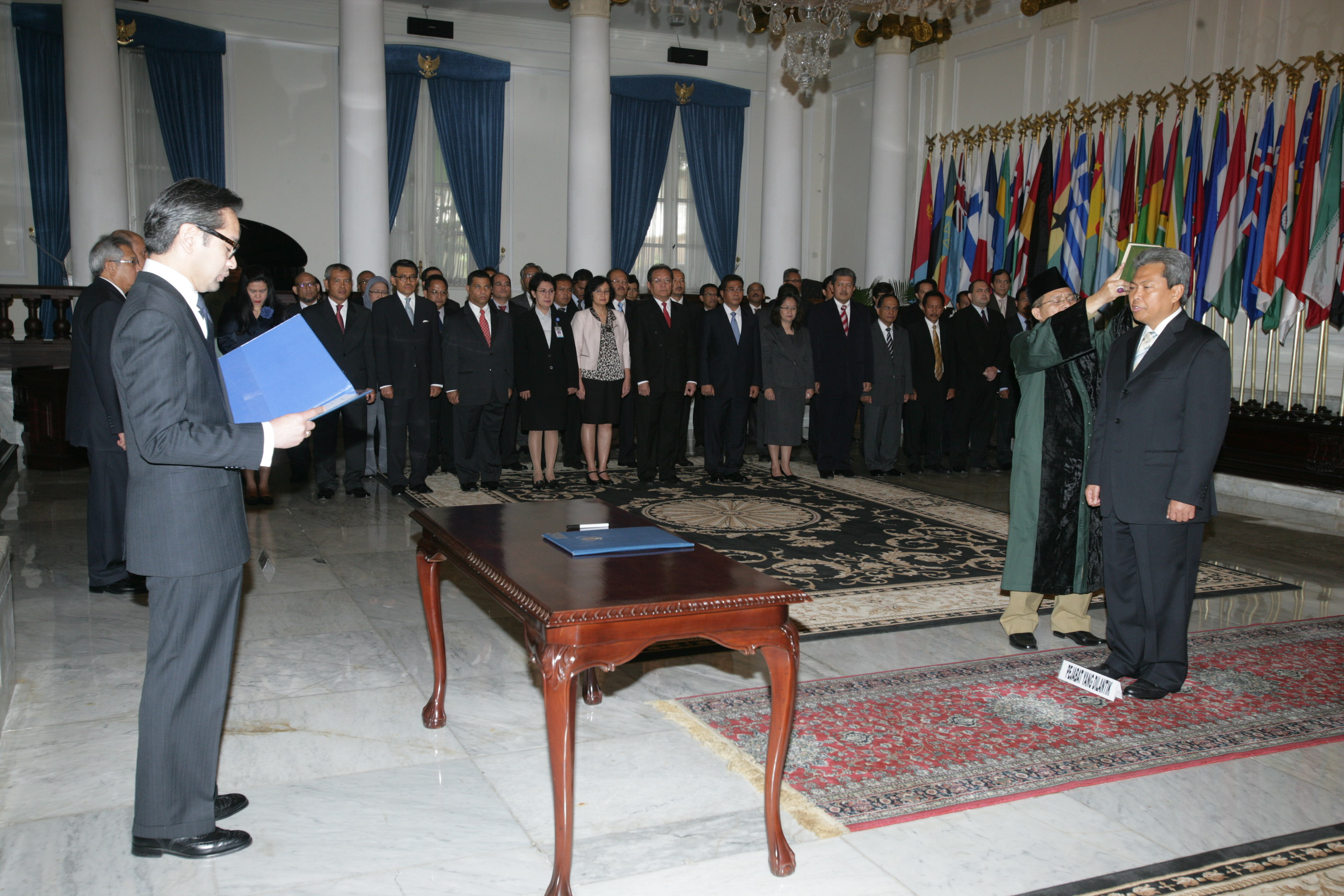
Budi being sworn in as the foreign ministry's secretary general.

After his ambassadorial tenure in Nairobi, on 18 October 2010 Budi became the foreign ministry's secretary-general. In this capacity, he was responsible for managing Indonesian representative offices in high-risk, crisis-affected countries, including Iraq, Afghanistan, Tunisia, Syria, and Libya. He instructed to close the Indonesian embassy in Tripoli and evacuate all citizens during the Libyan crisis, and visited Baghdad under a heavy armed convoy to select a safer location for the Indonesian embassy after it was hit by a suicide bomber. During his visit to Baghdad, the cars of his armed convoy frequently switched positions in order to prevent his presence being detected. Budi decided to move the embassy outside the Green Zone, near the location of an Iraqi ministry complex and other country embassies.

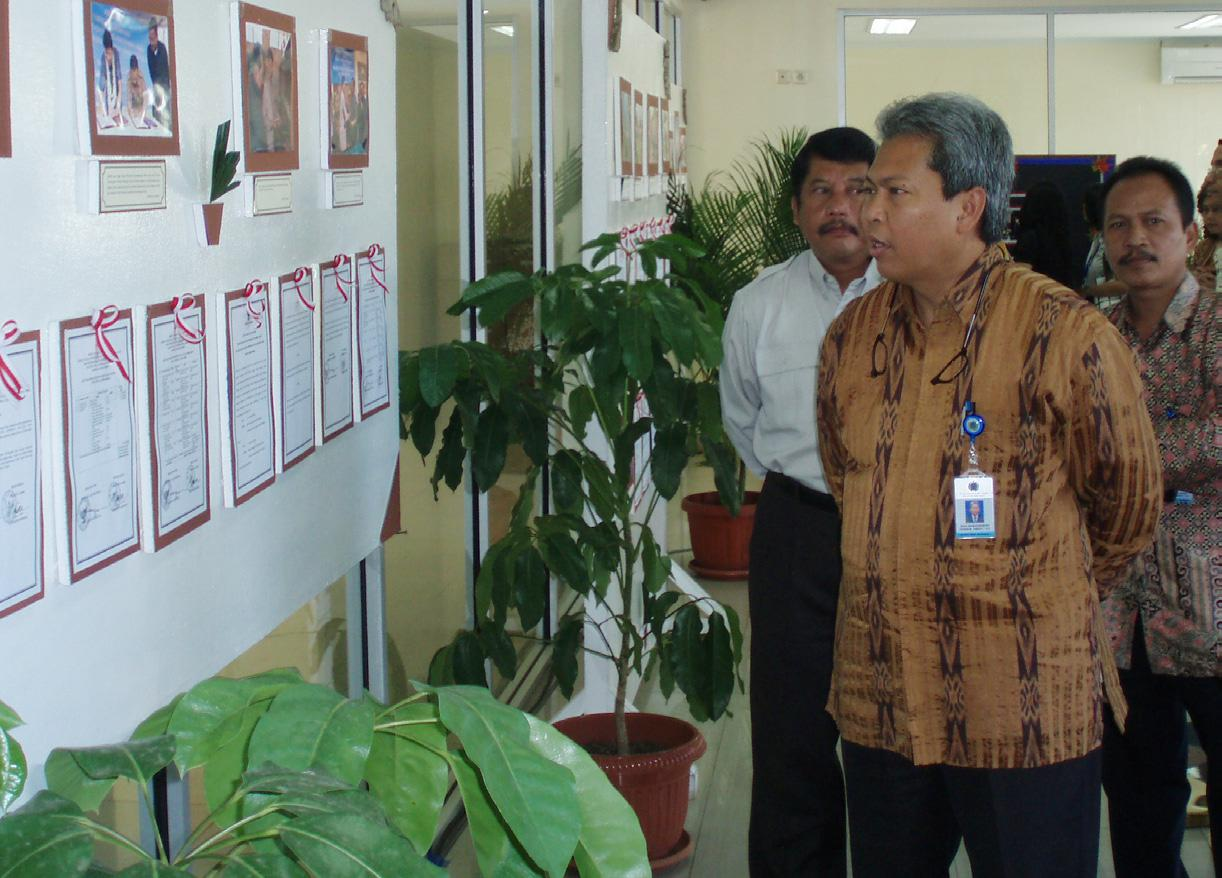
Budi Bowoleksono observing exhibitions of archives and photos of the foreign ministry in its archive building in 2011.

He also focused on internal bureaucratic reform, aiming to improve the ministry's performance evaluation score by developing better key performance indicator and establishing standard operating procedures to fix systemic inefficiencies. Budi also encouraged Indonesian diplomats abroad to promote Indonesia through what he called as "food diplomacy" by introducing Indonesia's dishes to the global audience.

In 2011, Budi was investigated by Corruption Eradication Commission for four hours as a witness to a case involving financial misappropriation and abuse of power by his predecessor as secretary general, Sudjadnan Parnohadiningrat. Two years later, in 2013 Budi was sued by Taufik Rigo, a junior diplomat at the embassy in Antananarivo who was recalled by his orders as a disciplinary punishment. Taufik stated that an anonymous report, which became the grounds for his recall, was misleading and defamed him. The court ultimately sided with Taufik, declaring his recall as invalid, and ordered the rehabilitation of Taufik's reputation and reinstatement to his post.

In 2013, Budi summoned the Australian ambassador to Indonesia Greg Moriarty following reports from the Edward Snowden files leak that the Australian embassy in Indonesia was being used as part of a surveillance network that intercepted phone calls in the country.

=== Ambassador to the United States ===
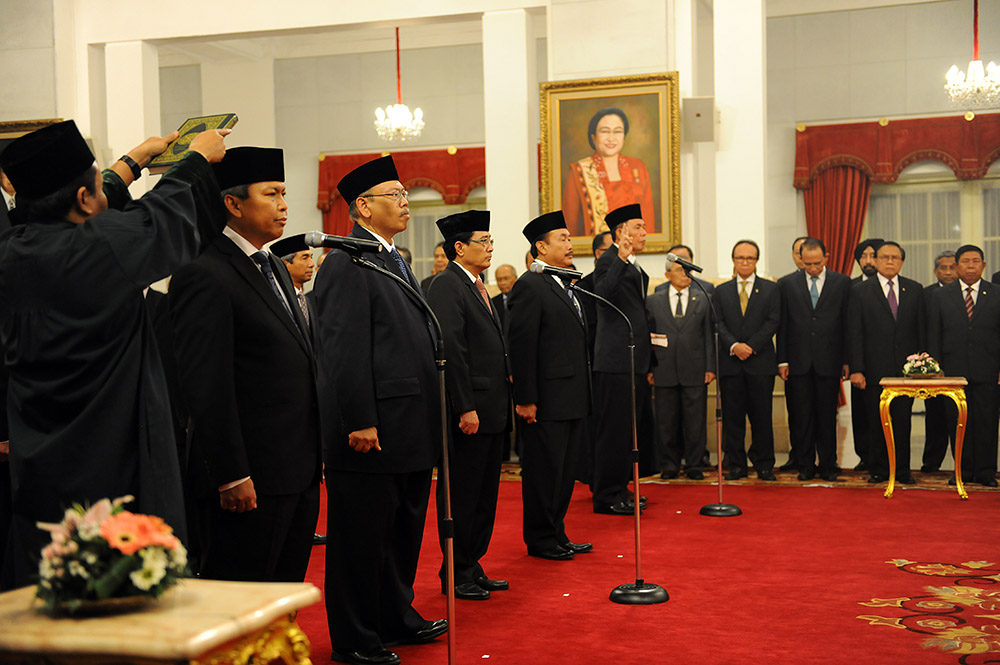
Budi (second from left) being sworn in as ambassador on 14 February 2014.

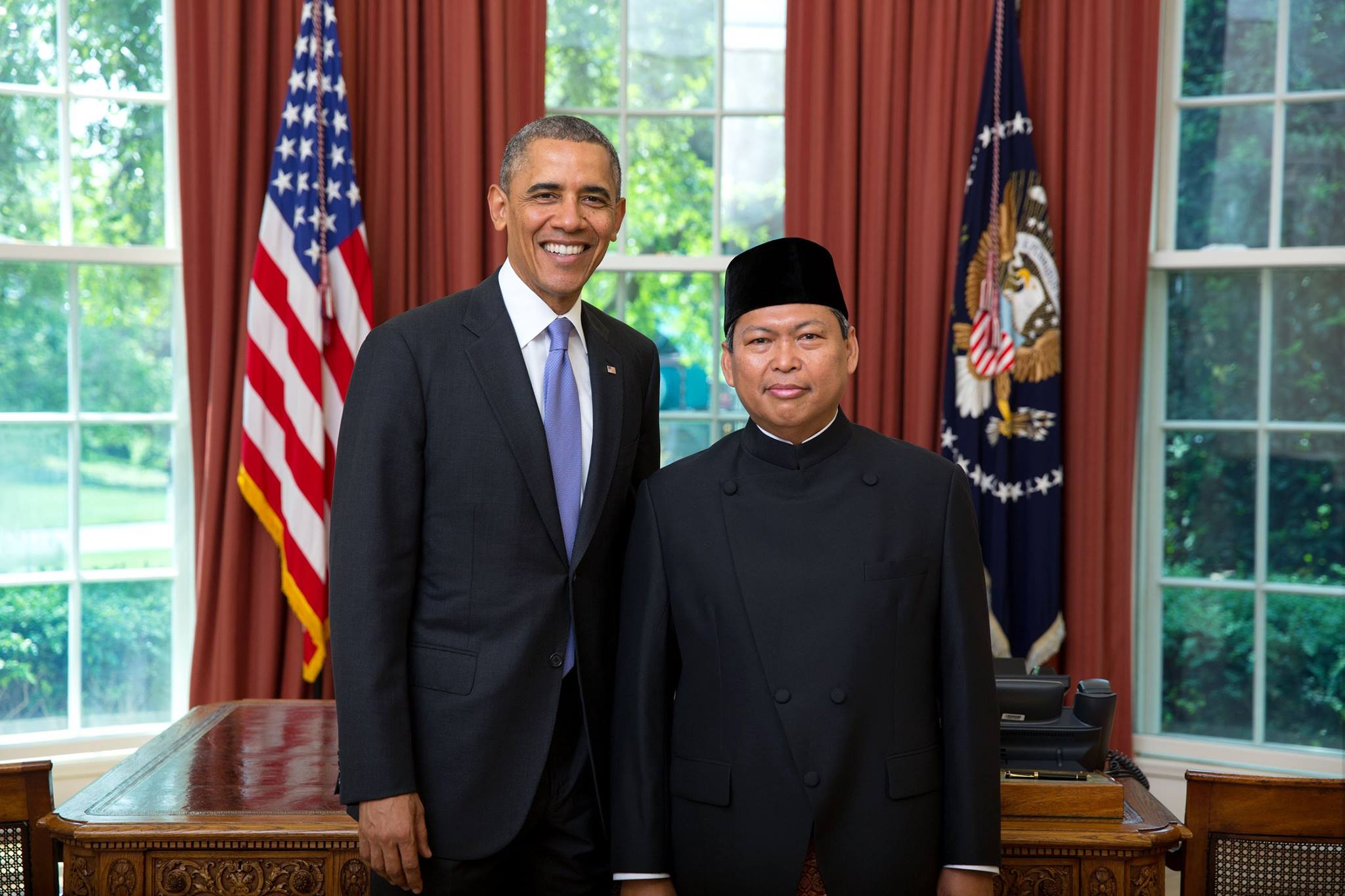
Budi at the presentation of his credentials to President Obama on 21 May 2014.

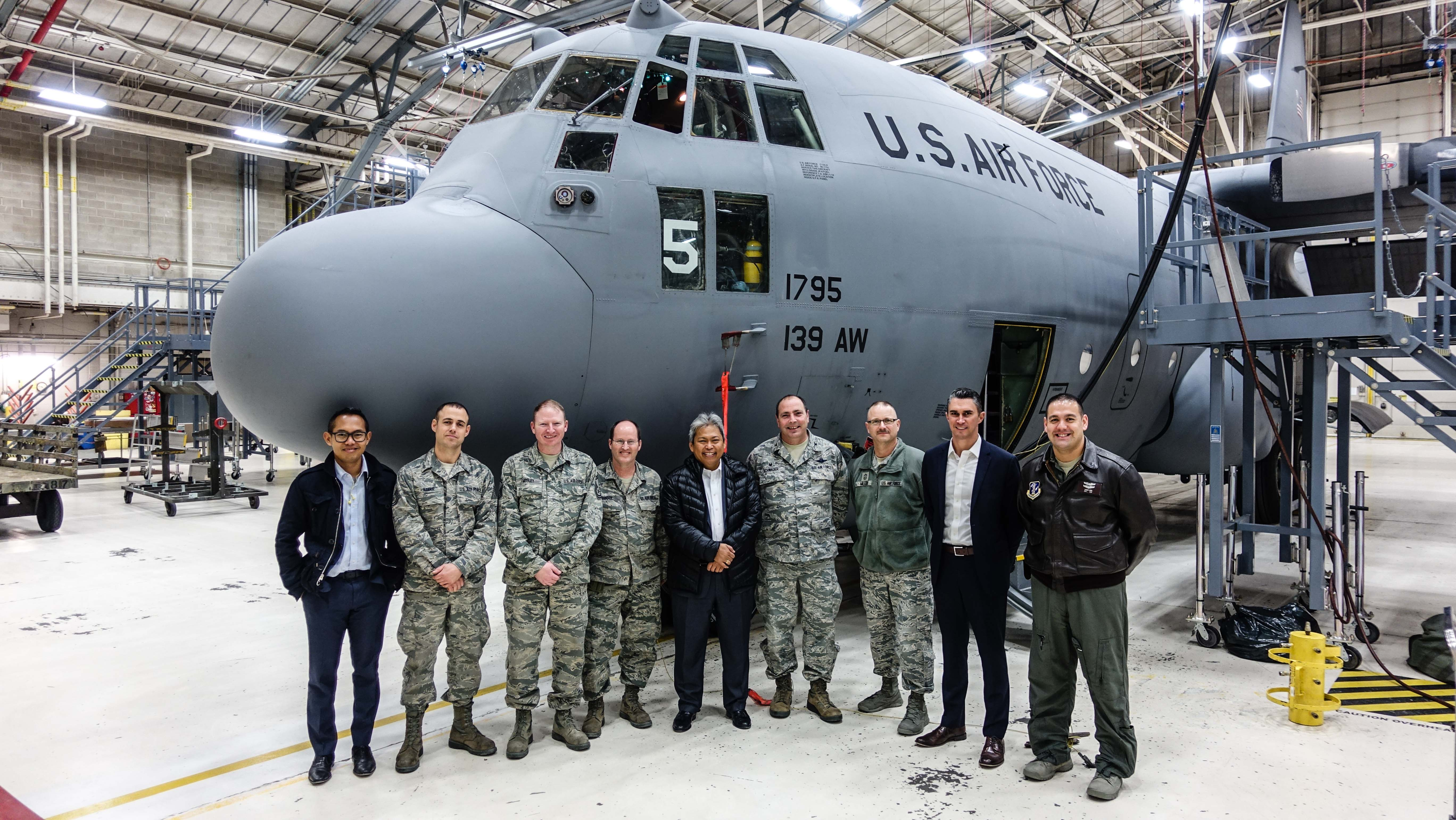
Budi (center) visiting the Rosecrans Air National Guard Base in 2017.

Budi was nominated as ambassador to the United States by President Susilo Bambang Yudhoyono on 3 September 2013. Despite initial resistance by some parliament members due to his past record of investigation by the Corruption Eradication Commission, he passed assessment by the House of Representative's first commission on 18 September 2013. Budi was sworn as ambassador to the United States on 14 February 2014 and presented his credentials to President of the United States Barack Obama on 21 May 2014. Despite being installed by Susilo Bambang Yudhoyono, Budi retained his position for the entire first term of President Joko Widodo, serving until February 2019. He served for almost five years, which was two years longer compared to the usual three-year ambassadorial term. According to Kornelius Purba from The Jakarta Post, Jokowi's decision to retain Budi during his first term was uncommon, since traditionally the president would replace the officeholder with his own appointee. As ambassador, he advocated for a "win-win" partnership, emphasizing that Indonesian commodities like palm oil and rubber are as vital to Indonesia's economy as corporations like Boeing are to the US. He also initiated the development of a smartphone-based self-report system to better connect with the large Indonesian diaspora.

Budi utilized his cooking ability to promote Indonesia through cuisine, earning him the nickname of the "culinary ambassador" from the diplomatic community and Indonesian diaspora. He supported efforts to upgrade Indonesia's cuisine by inviting Indonesian cooks such as William Wongso to cooking academies and supported Indonesian diaspora who opened Indonesian restaurants, such as a fine dining Indonesian restaurant in Houston. Budi was known for always bringing sambal chili paste in his briefcase when he traveled, and sometimes cooked for his colleagues in the diplomatic community. Mukti Romadona Setianto, a diplomat who had served in Washington, described that Budi transformed the embassy's kitchen into a "command center" for culinary diplomacy, and the embassy holds an "embassy adoption program" for schoolchildren around Washington to familiarize themselves with Indonesian culture and cookery, including tempeh.

Budi giving an interview to the Voice of America shortly after attending Trump's iftar dinner in 2018.

Representing Indonesia, a country with one of the largest Muslim populations in the world, Budi was involved in promoting moderate Islam, which he believed was facing a grave danger at that time. His wife also supported the effort by promoting the concept in diplomatic circles. Budi, along with Shaarik H. Zafar, Special Representative to Muslim Communities at the US Department of State, initiated the establishment of a Indonesia-US Muslim Advisory Council in 2016. During Trump's 2018 White House Iftar dinner, Budi sat beside Trump.

== Later life ==
After retiring from diplomatic service, from 2019 to 2021 Budi became a member of the board of commissioners of Sarana Daya Mandiri, a South Kalimantan based company responsible for management and maintenance of the Barito River channel. in January 2020 Budi became a member of the board of commissioners of the Merdeka Copper Gold, replacing Mahendra Siregar who had replaced him a year earlier as ambassador to the United States. He also became a member of the board of commissioners at Adaro Energy, an Indonesia mining and energy company. Budi also became the president commissioner of Adaro's subsidiary, Adaro Andalan, when it went public in late 2024.

== Personal life ==
Budi is married to Reshanty Tahar, a career diplomat, and has one son. According to Reshanty, she met Budi during the basic diplomatic training, and their colleagues often would matchmake for them. During her career, Reshanty took three leaves of absence: when giving birth to her baby and during Budi's assignment as ambassador in Kenya and in the United States.
