= Ibnu Said =

Indonesian diplomat (born 1955)

Ambassador of Indonesia to Denmark and Lithuania
- In office 13 January 2016 – June 2020
- President: Joko Widodo
- Preceded by: Bomer Pasaribu
- Succeeded by: Dewi Savitri Wahab

Inspector General of the Ministry of Foreign Affairs
- In office 23 April 2014 – 2015
- President: Susilo Bambang Yudhoyono; Joko Widodo
- Preceded by: Sugeng Rahardjo
- Succeeded by: Ferry Adamhar (acting); Mayerfas

Ambassador of Indonesia to Tunisia
- In office 30 January 2009 – 12 July 2012
- President: Susilo Bambang Yudhoyono
- Preceded by: Hertomo Reksodiputro
- Succeeded by: Ronny Prasetyo Yuliantoro

Personal details
- Born: 15 June 1955 (age 70) Sampang Regency, Madura, East Java, Indonesia
- Spouse: Sri Lestari Ningpuri
- Education: Airlangga University (S.H.)

Muhammad Ibnu Said (born 15 June 1955) is an Indonesian diplomat who last served as ambassador to Denmark, with concurrent accreditation to Lithuania, from 2016 to 2020. Previously, he served as ambassador to Tunisia from 2009 to 2012 and advisor (expert staff) to the minister of foreign affairs for management from 2012 to 2016. Throughout his career, he has been recognized for his contributions to strengthening bilateral relations, notably receiving the Order of the Danneborg from the Queen of Denmark and the Grand Star of Honour from Tunisia.

== Early life and education ==
Born on 15 June 1955 in Sampang, Madura, Ibnu Said began studying law at the Airlangga University with a specialization on criminal law in 1974. He graduated with a bachelor's degree in 1979. During his studies, he actively engaged in community and social activities through his participation in faculty-led research. Outside of his academic pursuits, he was a member of the student representative body and volunteered at the law faculty's legal aid institute. He was also an active member of the Muslim Students' Association.

== Career ==
Ibnu Said's diplomatic career began in 1980 when he was accepted into the foreign department. After completing basic diplomatic education, he was assigned as the chief of international taxation within the directorate of economic services in 1982. His career saw him posted to various countries, including Mexico City, Bangkok, and Ottawa. In Bangkok, he served as Indonesia's permanent representative to the United Nations Economic and Social Commission for Asia and the Pacific.

After serving in Indonesian representatives abroad, on 3 May 2002 Ibnu became the chief of planning and organization in the foreign department's secretariat general. He was then appointed as the chief of personnel bureau in the foreign ministry on 6 April 2004 before assuming duties as the advisor (expert staff) for management affairs to the foreign minister on 16 January 2006.

On 30 January 2009, Ibnu was installed as ambassador to Tunisia. He began his duties in March that year. During his tenure, he was instrumental in promoting Indonesian trade, tourism, and arts and culture across various provinces in Tunisia. He also played a key role in assisting the democratic transition in Tunisia by fostering concrete cooperation and sharing Indonesia's experiences in democratization. One of his major accomplishments was the successful evacuation of Indonesian citizens from Tunisia and Libya during the political crises of 2011. For his active role in advancing bilateral relations, he was awarded the Grand Star of Honour by Tunisian President Moncef Marzouki at the conclusion of his term. He served until 12 July 2012.

On 12 April 2012, Ibnu Said returned to his old post as advisor for management affairs to the foreign minister. Ibnu was described as the ministry's "locomotive" for bureaucratic reform, where he was involved in disseminating bureaucratic reform to Indonesian representatives abroad. Said described the foreign ministry as being ahead in terms of bureaucratic reforms and assured that foreign service officers would receive remunerations. In implementing these reforms, he worked closely with his similarly named counterpart Ibnu Wahyutomo, the chief of planning and organization of the foreign ministry's secretariat general, earning them nickname "the two Ibnus" (duo Ibnu).

Ibnu was promoted as the ministry's inspector on 23 April 2014. During his tenure, Ibnu reported the audit board's positive report on foreign ministry units, in which four units within the ministry received a satisfactory grade for delivering excellent public service. He was replaced as inspector general by Rachmat Budiman on 18 March 2016.

On 6 August 2015, President Joko Widodo nominated Ibnu Said as ambassador to Denmark, with concurrent accreditation to Lithuania, to the House of Representatives. Upon being assessed by the House of Representative's first commission on 16 September 2015, he was installed on 13 January 2016. He served until his return to Indonesia at the end of June 2020. During this period, high-level visits from top Denmark officials such as Queen Margrethe II, Prime Minister Lars Løkke Rasmussen, and Crown Princess Mary to Indonesia solidified cooperation across political, economic, security, and socio-cultural sectors. Under his ambassadorship, trade and investment, particularly in technology and shipbuilding, increased. On his 65th birthday, he was awarded the Order of the Dannebrog, Commander First Class, by Queen Margrethe II. The award was presented as a token of appreciation for his contributions to strengthening ties between the two nations.

== Personal life ==
Ibnu Said is married to Sri Lestari Ningpuri. He is proficient in English, French, Spanish, Thai, and Arabic.
