= Djismun Kasri =

Indonesian diplomat (born 1946)

Ambassador of Indonesia to Kenya
- In office 2003–2007
- Preceded by: Tupuk Sutrisno
- Succeeded by: Budi Bowoleksono

Personal details
- Born: 8 October 1946 (age 79) Pariaman, West Sumatra, Indonesia
- Spouse: Maizia Kasri
- Children: 2
- Education: University of Warsaw

Djismun Kasri (born 8 October 1946) is an Indonesian career diplomat who served as ambassador to Kenya from 2003 to 2007. He previously was the deputy permanent representative to the United Nations in Geneva and the secretary of the directorate general of foreign economic relations.

== Life and education ==
Kasri was born in Pariaman, West Sumatra, Indonesia, on 8 October 1946. His mother was Nurmali Latif, the granddaughter of Muhammad Saleh Datuk Rangkayo Basa, a wealthy Minangkabau merchant. Kasri pursued his higher education abroad, earning a master's degree from the University of Warsaw in Poland. He is married to Maizia Kasri, and the couple has two sons.

== Diplomatic career ==
Kasri joined the Department of Foreign Affairs in 1977. His early domestic and international assignments within the department included serving as Head of International Trade and Monetary Agencies Section in 1980, Head of Economic Sub-Division of the Indonesian Embassy in Bangkok from 1980 to 1984, Head of Economic Sub-Division of the Indonesian Permanent Mission in Geneva from 1984 to 1986, and Head of Trade and Development (UNCTAD) Section I from 1986 to 1989. He subsequently served as Head of Economic Division of the Indonesian Embassy in Vienna from 1989 to 1992, deputy director of Economic Cooperation among Developing Countries in 1993, and Head of Economic Division of the Indonesian Embassy in Paris from 1993 to 1996.

Continuing his international postings, Kasri served as Minister Counselor and Head of Economic Division of the Indonesian Permanent Mission in Geneva from 1996 to 1998. He then returned to Jakarta to serve as the Secretary of the Directorate General of Foreign Economic Relations at the Department of Foreign Affairs of the Republic of Indonesia from 1999 to 2001. In July 2001, he assumed his post as Deputy Permanent Representative of the Republic of Indonesia to the United Nations and Other International Organizations in Geneva. On 20 November 2003, Kasri was installed as ambassador to Kenya after being vetted by the House of Representative's first commission in September that year. Being concurrently accredited to United Nations Office at Nairobi, in February 2007 Kasri was elected to lead the Nairobi chapter of the G-77. His term ended in 2007 and after his retirement he entered the Indonesian Chamber of Commerce and Industry as the chair of the Indian committee.
