= Sugeng Rahardjo =

Indonesian diplomat (born 1954)

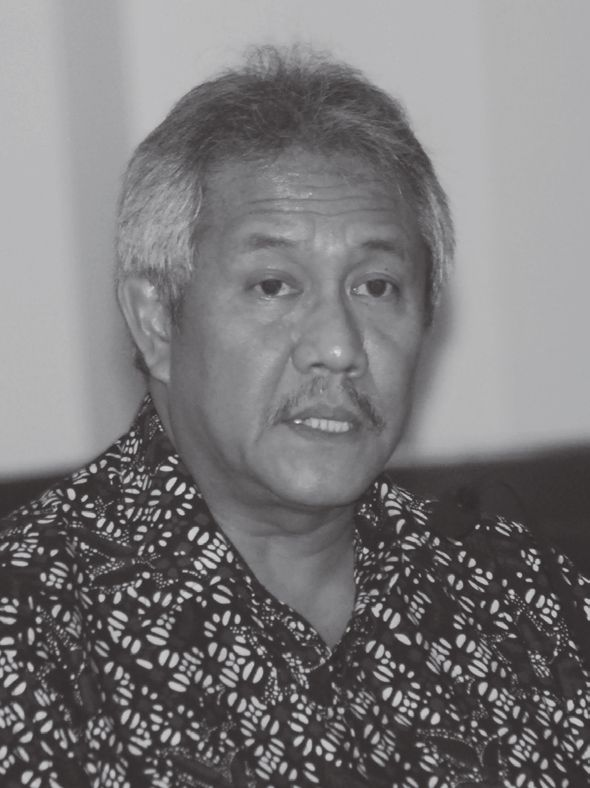
- Rahardjo in 2011

Ambassador of Indonesia to China
- In office 24 December 2013 – 1 December 2017
- President: Susilo Bambang Yudhoyono; Joko Widodo
- Preceded by: Imron Cotan
- Succeeded by: Djauhari Oratmangun

Ambassador of Indonesia to South Africa
- In office 11 November 2005 – 2009
- President: Susilo Bambang Yudhoyono
- Preceded by: Abdul Nasier
- Succeeded by: Sjahril Sabaruddin

Inspector General of the Foreign Ministry
- In office 2009 – 23 April 2014
- Minister: Marty Natalegawa
- Preceded by: Dienne Hardianti Moehario
- Succeeded by: Ibnu Said

Personal details
- Born: 18 September 1954 (age 71) Bandung, West Java, Indonesia

Sugeng Rahardjo (born 18 September 1954) is an Indonesian diplomat who served as ambassador to South Africa from 2005 to 2009 and to China from 2013 to 2017. Between his two ambassadorial terms, Sugeng was the foreign ministry's inspector general.

== Early life and education ==
Born on 18 September 1954 in Bandung, Sugeng Rahardjo completed his economics degree from an unnamed university in 1980.

== Diplomatic career ==
=== Early career ===
Sugeng Rahardjo began his career at the foreign service shortly after completing his basic diplomatic education in 1983. He started off as the chief of diplomatic mission administration and appointments record keeping in the foreign ministry's secretariat general. By 1984, he was assigned as attaché at Indonesia's diplomatic mission in New York for a year, before being reassigned to the political section of the embassy in Buenos Aires, Argentina. In Buenos Aires, Sugeng took a course on Latin America's history at the Pontifical Catholic University of Argentina.

Sugeng returned to the foreign ministry's central office as chief of Africa and Latin America section in the directorate of developing countries economic relations. Sugeng, then a junior diplomat, accompanied president Suharto as a clerk at his meeting with Nelson Mandela. Sugeng witnessed president Suharto giving Mandela a batik shirt designed by Iwan Tirta as a gift. Mandela's appreciation of Indonesia's financial assistance to the post-Apartheid South Africa led to his habit of wearing batik shirt to formal events, which played a role in popularizing batik as the Madiba shirt in South Africa.

Following his tenure in the foreign ministry, he took up another overseas posting as economic chief at the embassy in Washington until 1995. During this time, in 1991 Sugeng took a diplomatic course at the School of Advanced International Studies and on development strategies by the World Bank in 1992. At the onset of the Asian financial crisis, in 1995 Sugeng returned to Jakarta became the foreign ministry's deputy director for investment affairs. During this period, Sugeng undertook mid-level and senior diplomatic education in 1997. Around the time of the fall of Suharto in 1998, Sugeng was posted to head the economic section of Indonesia's permanent mission in Geneva. He played a role in renegotiating Indonesia's debt at the Paris Club due the financial crisis at that time.

=== Director and ambassador ===
In light of the foreign ministry's reorganization, on 1 March 2002 Sugeng was appointed to the newly established post of director of ASEAN dialogue partner and interregional cooperation. Sugeng played a role in ASEAN's cooperation on counterterrorism, with the organization involving dialogue partners to reinforce solidity on the issue.

On 11 November 2005, Sugeng was installed as ambassador to South Africa. Sugeng presented his credentials to president Thabo Mbeki on 18 January 2006. After a four-year ambassadorial stint, Sugeng became the foreign ministry's inspector general. As inspector general, he initiated regular publications by the agency: the Kaleidoskop magazine in 2012 and the Quality Asssurance magazine in 2013, which aimed to familiarize the foreign ministry with the inspectorate general.

In response to the habit of diplomats in holding unnecessary meetings outside office, in 2010 Sugeng released a memorandum aimed at tightening the oversight of official travel and external committee activities. Sugeng also rebuked the interdepartmental habit of inviting officials to share travel benefits, which caused favoritism among civil servants. Although there were critics that accused Sugeng of lowering diplomat's welfare through his note, no one officially challenged the memo in a formal discussion or debate, despite his invitation to do so. He addressed the criticisms regarding welfare as an unprofessional reaction from those already earning a decent living. The note also initial caused concerns during the launching of the Quality Asssurance magazine due to a projected lack of attendance, but this was quickly disproven with the presence of a crowd of attendees.

Sugeng was then nominated as ambassador to China, with concurrent accreditation to Mongolia, by President Susilo Bambang Yudhoyono on 3 September 2013. He passed assessment by the House of Representative's first commission on 18 September 2013 and was sworn in on 24 December 2013. Shortly following his inauguration, Sugeng pledged to "transfer" China's wealth to Indonesia through various sectors. He arrived in China in February 2014 and received his duties from charge d'affaires ad interim Wisnu Edi Pratignyo on 3 March 2014. He presented his credentials to president Tsakhiagiin Elbegdorj on 13 March 2014 and to president Xi Jinping of China on 20 March 2014.

In light of president Joko Widodo's directive to increase investments from China, in April 2015 Sugeng proposed an investment desk to attract Chinese investment. Sugeng's ambassadorial tenure saw an increase of tourism from China to Indonesia. His term ended on 1 December 2017, and he was replaced by Listyowati as chargé d'affaires ad interim. Upon retiring from the foreign service, Sugeng entered business and became the president director of Gajah Tunggal rubber tire company in June 2018. He later published a book on his diplomatic service in China, titled Unboxing China in 2021 and on his takes regarding geopolitical issues titled Healing the World – Extinguishing the Flames of the Third World War in 2023.
