= Imron Cotan =

Indonesian diplomat (born 1954)

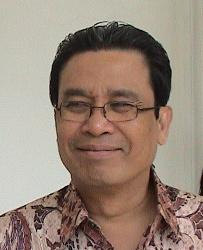

Ambassador of Indonesia to China
- In office 2010–2013
- President: Susilo Bambang Yudhoyono
- Preceded by: Sudrajat
- Succeeded by: Sugeng Rahardjo

Secretary General of the Ministry of Foreign Affairs
- In office 16 February 2006 – July 2010
- Preceded by: Sudjadnan Parnohadiningrat
- Succeeded by: Triyono Wibowo (acting); Budi Bowoleksono

Ambassador of Indonesia to Australia
- In office 20 November 2003 – 2005
- President: Megawati Sukarnoputri; Susilo Bambang Yudhoyono
- Preceded by: Sudjadnan Parnohadiningrat
- Succeeded by: Hamzah Thayeb

Personal details
- Born: 21 December 1954 (age 71) Indonesia
- Spouse: Sri Nuraeni Cotan
- Children: 3
- Education: Gadjah Mada University
- Profession: Diplomat

Imron Cotan (born 21 December 1954) is an Indonesian diplomat. He was Ambassador of Indonesia to Australia between 2003 and 2005, and Ambassador of Indonesia to China between 2010 and 2013.

== Early life ==
Imron was born on 21 December 1954. He graduated from Gadjah Mada University in 1982, majoring in international relations, before joining the Indonesian Department of Foreign Affairs on the next year. After completing the department's course for junior diplomats in 1984, he was assigned to supervise Indonesia's bilateral cooperation with friendly countries regarding environmental preservation. He was then posted to the permanent mission in Geneva in 1986 with the rank of third secretary, handling matters related to intellectual property rights. He was then instructed to participate in the UN Disarmament Fellowship Program in 1989 to familiarize himself with issues of international peace and security.

Following this, he returned to the foreign ministry as the chief of the disarmament section within the Directorate of International Organizations, Directorate General for Political Affairs, a position he held for two years. In 1992, he was again sent to Geneva to head the international peace and security affairs section, first as a second secretary and later promoted to first secretary, serving until 1997. During this period, he was intensively involved in various negotiating forums, including the Conference on Disarmament, Chemical Weapons Convention (CWC) Conferences, Biological Weapons Convention (BWC) Conferences, Non-Proliferation Treaty (NPT) Review and Extension Conferences, and the UN General Assembly. Notably, during the 1995 NPT Review and Extension Conference, Mr. Imron served as the spokesman for the Non-Aligned Movement and was Indonesia's chief negotiator in Main Committee I.

Upon returning to Jakarta in 1997, Imron briefly served as deputy director (chief of subdirectorate) for mass media, with responsibilities on monitoring and issuing permits for foreign correspondents operating in Indonesia. He became the deputy assistant for political affairs to the minister of state secretary, responsible for policy formulation on Indonesia's foreign relations. The office was reorganized into the bureau of international studies, and Imron retained the leadership of the new office. During this period, he received the Satya Wirakarya' Medal of Honor from President Megawati Soekarnoputri.

In May 2002, Imron became the deputy chief of mission at the embassy in Canberra. After ambassador Sudjadnan Parnohadiningrat departed to Jakarta to serve as the foreign ministry's secretary general on 27 April 2002, Imron became the embassy's chargé d'affaires ad interim. He was briefly recalled to Jakarta in August 2003 to be nominated as ambassador to Russia. However, the House of Representatives recommended him to be appointed as ambassador to Australia instead due to his superb performance. He was installed as ambassador on 20 November 2003 and presented his credentials to the Governor General of Australia Michael Jefferry eight days later.

In November 2003, Imron took up a post as Ambassador of Indonesia to Australia. Speaking about on his time in Australia at the end of the posting in 2005, Imron reflected that the relationship was difficult when he first came to Canberra in 2003 because of events that happened in East Timor in 1999. Imron said the aid and relief Australia's military had provided to Indonesia in the wake of the 2004 Indian Ocean earthquake and tsunami had brought the two countries closer. He said however that he was stunned at the way Australians reacted to the arrest and sentencing of Schapelle Corby for drug smuggling in 2004–05—some Australians wanted the country's tsunami aid taken into account in Corby's sentencing.

Imron became the secretary general of the foreign ministry on 16 February 2006. As secretary general, Imron served as Indonesia's senior official meeting leader for ASEAN and chairman of the Governing Board of the Indonesian Council on World Affairs (ICWA).

Imron was appointed Ambassador of Indonesia to China in 2010. In an interview in 2011, Imron said he was proud to see the relationship between the two countries reach its highest point ever. While he was ambassador, the Indonesian Government opened a consulate general in Shanghai, which was expected to enhance the ties between the two nations.

== Personal life ==
Imron is married to Sri Nuraeni Cotan, and they have two daughters and a son.

Diplomatic posts
Preceded by Sudjadnan Parnohadiningrat	Ambassador of Indonesia to Australia; 2003–2005	Succeeded by Teuku Mohammad Hamzah Thayeb
Preceded by Sudrajat	Ambassador of Indonesia to China; 2010–2013	Succeeded by Sugeng Rahardjo
