= Sudjadnan Parnohadiningrat =

Indonesian diplomat (1952–2025)

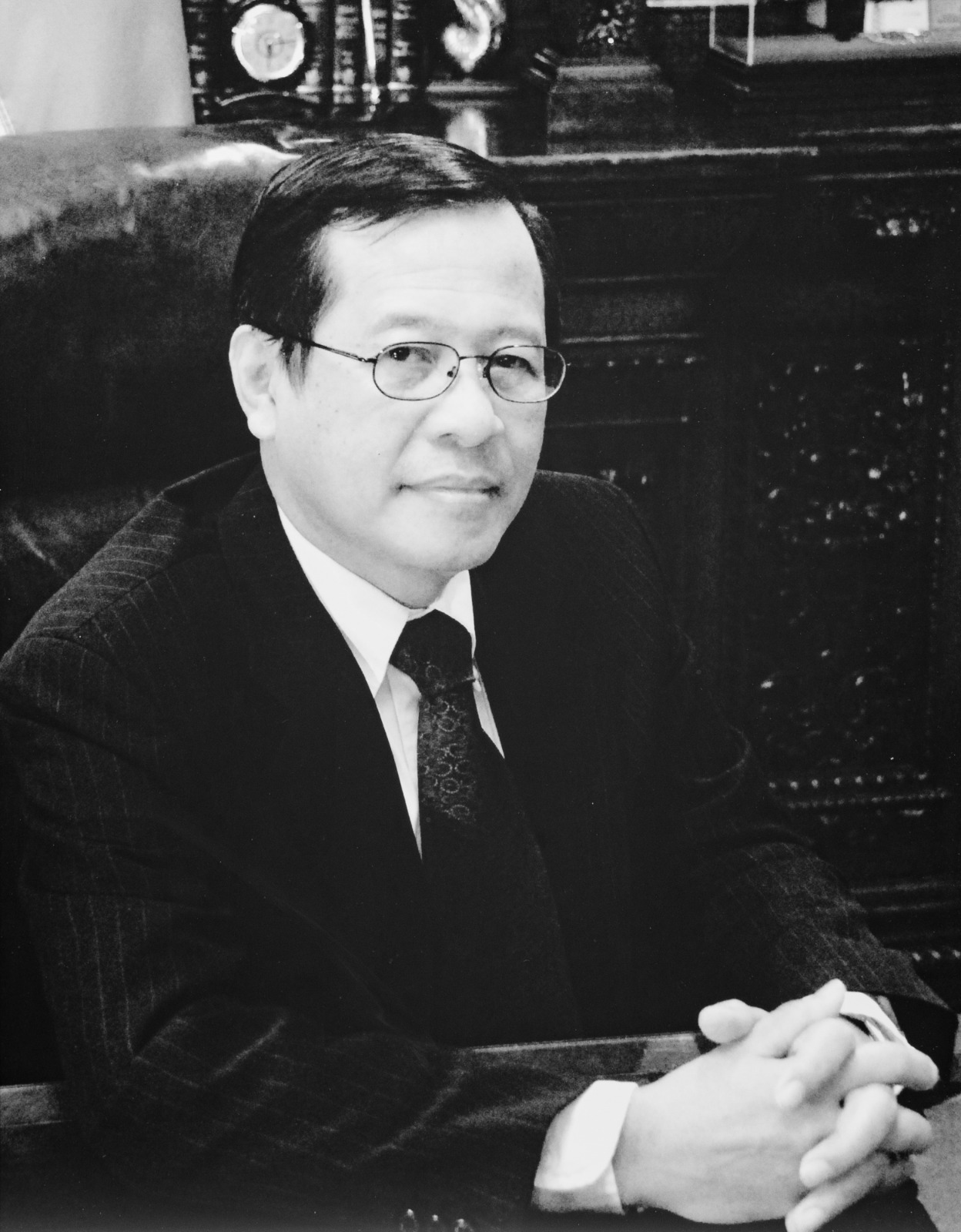
- Sudjadnan Parnohadiningrat

Secretary General of the Department of Foreign Affairs
- In office 3 May 2002 – 16 January 2006
- Preceded by: Arizal Effendi
- Succeeded by: Imron Cotan

Personal details
- Born: 21 October 1952 Yogyakarta, Indonesia
- Died: 28 June 2025 (aged 72) Canberra, Australia
- Education: Gadjah Mada University; Columbia University
- Occupation: Public servant, diplomat

Sudjadnan Parnohadiningrat (21 October 1952 – 28 June 2025) was an Indonesian diplomat. He served as an official in the Indonesian Department of Foreign Affairs for over two decades.

Sudjadnan held several high-profile positions, including Secretary General of the Ministry of Foreign Affairs (2002 to 2006), Ambassador of Indonesia to Australia (2001–2002) and Ambassador to the United States (2006–2009).

In January 2011, Sudjadnan was charged in court for unlawfully authorizing fund disbursement in 2003 to Indonesian Embassy in Singapore when he was Secretary General of the DFA. He was released in October 2011 and received another separate court verdict in 2014 for he was responsible in the DFA budget misappropriation in 2004–2005, for which he served some 20 months in Sukamiskin prison.

== Early life and education ==
Sudjadnan was born on 21 October 1952 in Yogyakarta, Indonesia. He was married with three children.

Sudjadnan graduated from Gadjah Mada University in 1978 with a degree in International Relations. He then joined the Indonesian Department of Foreign Affairs in 1981 and completed several courses with the department. In 1997 Sudjadnan attended a Master of International Affairs (MIA) Programme at Columbia University, New York City.

== Career ==
Between 1981 and 2011, Sudjadnan was employed in Indonesia’s Foreign Service.

From 1982 to 1984, Sudjadnan served as Attaché to the Indonesian Permanent Mission to Geneva; from 1984 to 1986, as Second Secretary to the Indonesian Permanent Mission in Vienna; from 1986 to 1988, as Head of Disarmament Section, Department of Foreign Affairs in Jakarta; and, from 1989 to 1992, Sudjadnan was the First Secretary in the Indonesian Permanent Mission to the UN, Geneva. In 1993, he returned to Jakarta where was appointed Head of Sub-Directorate Politics and Security in the Department of Foreign Affairs.

From 1996 until 1998, Sudjadnan served as Minister Counsellor at Indonesia’s Permanent Mission to the United Nations in New York City; in 1999 as the Secretary for the Task Force on the Implementation of the East Timor Referendum; from 1999 until 2001 as Director for International Organisations; and from 2001 to 2002 as Ambassador of Indonesia to Australia and Vanuatu. His time in Australia coincided with the Tampa affair, when the Australian Government denied permission to a Norwegian vessel to unload rescued asylum seekers at Christmas Island. Sudjadnan said that the asylum seekers should not be forced to go to Indonesia and that the Indonesian Government said they would not accept the asylum seekers.

Sudjadnan was recalled to Indonesia from Australia in April 2002, promoted to the role of Secretary General of the Department of Foreign Affairs. He served in the role for four years, until the end of 2005, and also acted as Senior Official Meeting Leader for both the Asia Africa Summit and the Association of Southeast Asian Nations (ASEAN). In addition, he chaired the Third Non-Proliferation Treaty Preparatory Committee meeting during the treaty’s 2005 review and spoke at many international seminars, workshop etc. mostly on issues relating to international security, non-proliferation and disarmament including at the Carnegie International Non-Proliferation Conference in April 2009.

On 13 January 2006, Sudjadnan was appointed Indonesian Ambassador to the United States.

== Corruption charges ==
In 2010, the Corruption Eradication Commission (KPK) implicated Sudjadnan in corruption relating to the renovation of the Indonesian Embassy in Singapore, which had taken place in 2003 while he was Secretary General of the Department of Foreign Affairs. According to Mochamad Slamet Hidayat, who was Indonesian Ambassador to Singapore in 2003, Sudjadnan was accused to have received US$200,000 of the project funds. Facing the anti-corruption court in Jakarta in January 2011, Sudjadnan denied receiving the funds and causing any losses to the State. In the court's verdict he was only found guilty of unlawfully disbursing funds to the embassy in Singapore and was sentenced to 20 months in prison. Sudjadnan's sentence was shortened and he was released from prison early, in October 2011.

In February 2012 the KPK named him a suspect in a second case, alleging that he was responsible for budget misappropriations committed by organizing committees of 16 international events organised by the Department of Foreign Affairs in 2004 and 2005, causing losses to the state of approximately US$1.2 million. In court, Sudjadnan claimed that he was acting on the instruction of President Megawati Sukarnoputri and the foreign minister, Hassan Wirajuda. He said that after the Bali bombings and several other terrorist attacks in 2002 - 2005, the Government had sought to improve the country’s image by hosting as many international conferences as possible. He took pride in putting together 16 international conferences in just two years, claiming that the events have returned far more money to the Indonesian economy than the cost to the Indonesian Government. During the court proceeding he claimed that one of the international conferences in which he proudly took leading role, was in the Tsunami Summit, January 5–6, 2005 that had yielded the sum of US$4.3 billion (approx. Rp. 46 trillion) pledges made for Aceh Tsunami rehabilitation and reconstruction, by tens of heads of state and governments and a number of heads of international financial institutions such as the World Bank, IMF, ADB etc. who attended the Tsunami Summit. The former Indonesian Vice President Jusuf Kalla who appeared during the court proceeding in April 2014 testified that Sudjadnan as Secretary General of DFA, acted under an emergency situation to approve the Summit budget that should not be charged as committing corruption. Sudjadnan also claimed that financing for all 16 conferences was approved by the Ministry of Finance. In July 2014 Sudjadnan was sentenced to 30 months in prison for graft. Sudjadnan was released after serving less than 30 months at Sukamiskin prison.

== Death ==
Sudjadnan died in Canberra, Australia on 28 June 2025, at the age of 72.

Diplomatic posts
Preceded by Arizal Effendi	Ambassador of Indonesia to Australia; 2001–2002	Succeeded by Imron Cotan
Preceded by	Ambassador of Indonesia to the United States; 2006–2008	Succeeded by
Government offices
Preceded by	Secretary General of the Department of Foreign Affairs; 2002–2006	Succeeded by
