= Arizal Effendi =

Indonesian diplomat

- Born: 23 March 1949; Medan, North Sumatra
- Died: 8 December 2008 (aged 59); Jakarta, Indonesia
- Education: University of Indonesia
- Occupation: Diplomat

Arizal Effendi (23 March 1949 – 8 December 2008) was an Indonesian diplomat.

Born in Medan, North Sumatra, Arizal Effendi was a career diplomat. As Indonesian Ambassador to Australia he and his family arrived in Australia on 7 November 1999 and delivered his credentials on 19 November 1999. Addressing the National Press Club in February 2000, he called on Australia's media to be more responsible in its coverage of Indonesia, in the hope that would help to restore bilateral relations.

Arizal Effendi died on 8 December 2008 while being ambassador to France.

Diplomatic posts
Preceded by Wiryono Sastrohandoyo	Ambassador of Indonesia to Australia; 1999 – 2001	Succeeded by Sudjadnan Parnohadiningrat
Preceded by	Ambassador of Indonesia to France; 2005 – 2008	Succeeded by
