= Mohamad Oemar =

Indonesian diplomat (born 1961)

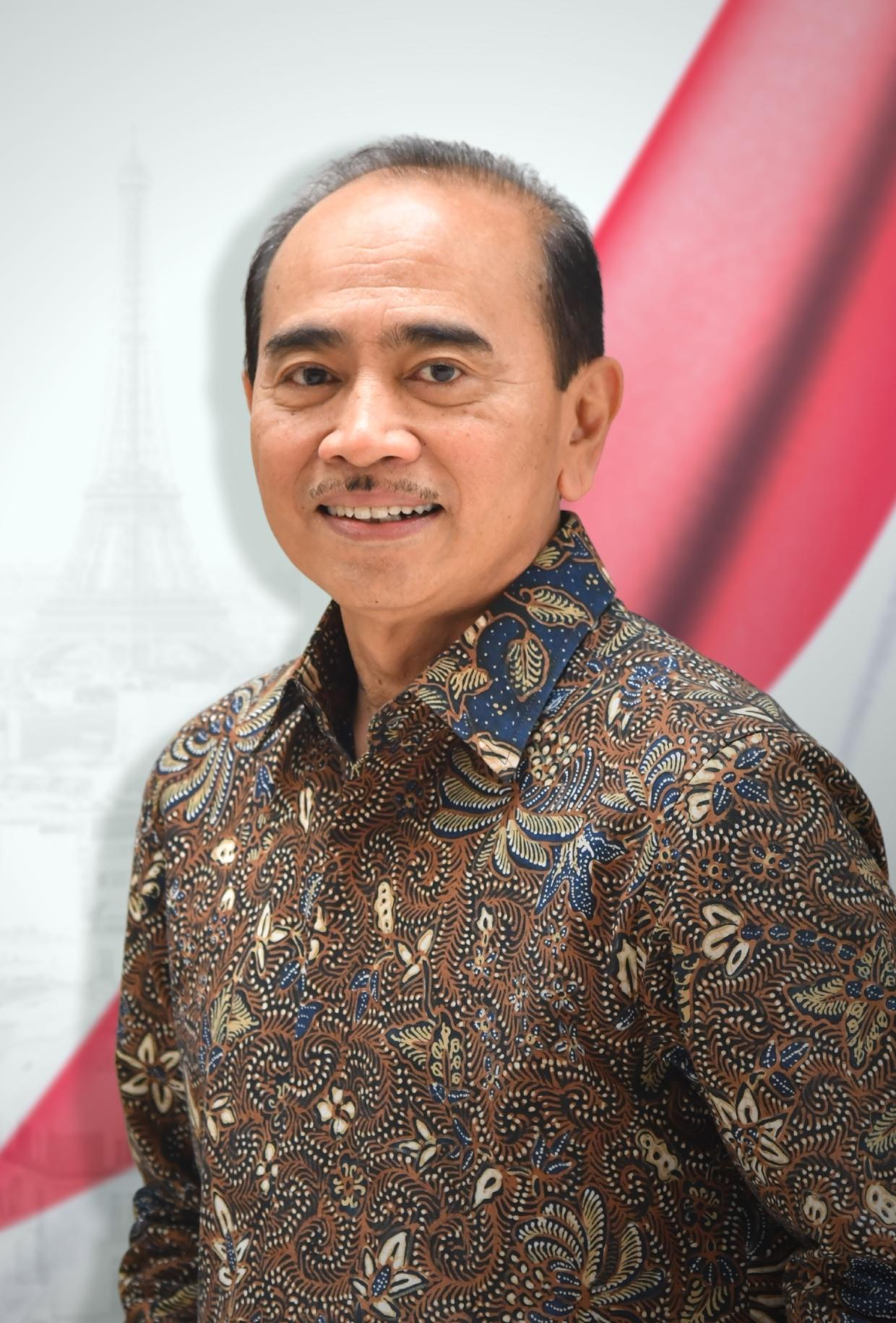

Ambassador to France, Andorra, Monaco, and UNESCO
- Incumbent
- Assumed office 25 October 2021
- President: Joko Widodo; Prabowo Subianto
- Preceded by: Arrmanatha Christiawan Nasir

Secretary to the Vice President
- In office 2 February 2011 – 25 October 2021
- Vice President: Boediono; Jusuf Kalla; Maruf Amin
- Preceded by: Tursandi Alwi
- Succeeded by: Ahmad Erani Yustika

Ambassador to Italy
- In office 30 January 2009 – 1 February 2011
- President: Susilo Bambang Yudhoyono
- Preceded by: Susanto Sutoyo
- Succeeded by: August Parengkuan

Personal details
- Born: 11 November 1961 (age 64) Semarang, Indonesia
- Spouse: Gayatri Perdana Dewi
- Children: 1
- Education: Gadjah Mada University (Drs.); Université libre de Bruxelles (M.A.)
- Profession: Diplomat

Mohamad Oemar (born 11 November 1961) is an Indonesian diplomat who is currently serving as ambassador to France since 2021. Prior to this, he served as ambassador to Italy from 2009 to 2010 and as secretary to the vice president from 2011 to 2021.

== Early life ==
Oemar was born on 11 November 1961 in Semarang. He studied international relations at the Gadjah Mada University, where he earned his Bachelor's degree in 1986. He furthered his studies in 1993, obtaining a master's degree in international relations and strategic studies from the Université libre de Bruxelles in Belgium.

== Diplomatic career ==
Oemar began his career in 1987 after completing the junior diplomatic school. From 1990 to 1994, he was posted at the embassy in Brussels as information, social, and cultural officer. Following this, he returned to Indonesia to serve as the head of section of environment within the directorate of multilateral economic cooperation from 1994 to 1995, and subsequently as the head of administration and finance section in the same directorate from 1995 to 1996.

Upon completing the mid-level diplomatic course in 1996, Oemar was posted at the permanent mission to the United Nations in Geneva, serving as second coordinator of economic affairs until 2000. He later became deputy director (chief of subdirectorate) for the United Nations Economic and Social Council within the foreign ministry, from 2000 to 2002. After attending the senior diplomatic course, from 2004 to 2006 he was director of multilateral trade and industry within the foreign ministry. He was then appointed as deputy ambassador to China from 2006 to 2009. During his tenure, the embassy strictened control of visa issuance to prevent abuse, as many Chinese citizens were found misusing their visas by working in Indonesia without proper authorization. The 17th National Congress of the Chinese Communist Party was also held during his posting there, which he lauded for laying out clear policies in economics, politics, and socio-culture of China.

After his assignment in China, on 30 January 2009 Oemar was posted to Rome as ambassador to Italy, with accreditations extending to the Malta, Cyprus, and international organizations including FAO, IFAD, UNCHS, and UNIDROIT. He presented his credentials to President Giorgio Napolitano of Italy on 10 March, president of IFAD, Kanayo F. Nwanze on 28 April, and executive director of the WFP Josette Sheeran on 7 May. As Indonesia's representative to the FAO, he was elected as the chairman of FAO's 68th Session of the Committee on Commodity Problems.

On 1 February 2011, Oemar was installed as secretary to Vice President Boediono. In 2014, Oemar was nominated to replace Arif Havas Oegroseno as ambassador to Belgium. Although his nomination was approved and he was installed by outgoing President Susilo Bambang Yudhoyono five days before his presidential term ended, the-then new President Joko Widodo cancelled his nomination, and nominated the foreign ministry's director general for Asia and Pacific region Yuri Octavian Thamrin instead. He retained his role and was installed on 26 May 2015 following organizational changes within the vice presidential secretariat.

During his second term, Oemar sparked controversy by also serving as President Commissioner of Indonesia Power, a state-owned enterprise subsidiary since March 2020, and for recommending the rector of the International Indonesian Islamic University Komaruddin Hidayat as an independent commissioner at the Indonesian Sharia Bank. There were demands for Oemar to resign following the revelation of the former, while Oemar himself denied the latter, as he stated that he has no authority to provide recommendations, approval, or any form of involvement in the selection of state-owned enterprise commissioners. He was re-appointed for a third term under vice president Ma'ruf Amin on 20 January 2021, which raised questions about bureaucratic regeneration and his supposedly “extraordinary” performance. In total, Oemar served as secretary to three different vice presidents for a decade.

In February 2021, Oemar was nominated as ambassador of Indonesia to France, with concurrent accreditation to Andorra, Monaco, and UNESCO. After passing the House of Representatives assessment in July, he was installed on 25 October 2021. He presented his credentials to Director General of UNESCO Audrey Azoulay on 7 January 2022, Co-prince of Andorra Joan Enric Vives i Sicília on 1 April 2022, Albert II, Prince of Monaco on 22 May 2022, and President of France Emmanuel Macron on 22 July 2022.

== Personal life ==
Mohamad Oemar is married to Gayatri Perdana Dewi, and together they have a child named Andayan Nandiwardhana. Mohamad Oemar is a Muslim.
