= Hari Prabowo =

Indonesian diplomat (born 1976)

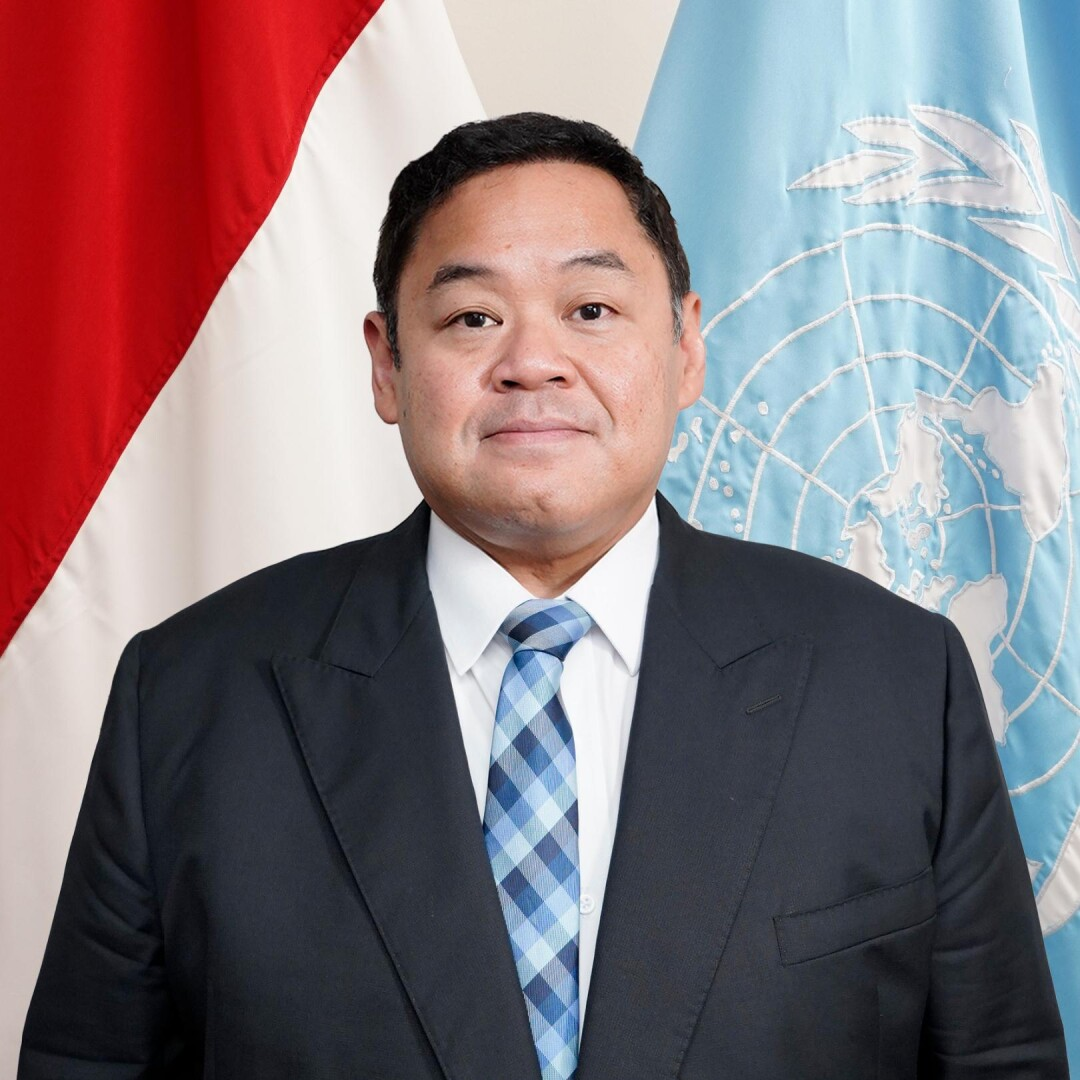

Ambassador of Indonesia to Thailand
- Incumbent
- Assumed office 19 December 2025
- Preceded by: Rachmat Budiman

Personal details
- Born: 5 July 1976 (age 49)
- Education: Gadjah Mada University (S.I.P); Monash University (MDAT)

Hari Prabowo (born 5 July 1976) is an Indonesian diplomat who is currently serving as ambassador to Thailand and UNESCAP since 2025. Before assuming his current duties, Hari was the foreign ministry's director of development, economy, and environmental affairs from 2021 to 2023 and deputy permanent representative to the United Nations from 2023 to 2025.

== Early life and education ==
Born on 5 July 1976, Hari studied international relations at the Gadjah Mada University from 1994, graduating with a bachelor's degree in 1999. During his undergraduate studies, he participated in the non-degree AIKOM exchange program at the University of Tokyo from 1997 to 1998, focusing on liberal studies. He pursued master's degree in diplomacy and trade at the Monash University from 2002 and graduated in 2003.

== Diplomatic career ==
Upon graduating, Hari briefly worked for Standard Chartered as an assistant manager for banking products development before joining the foreign ministry in December 2000. He served as a junior foreign service officer in the foreign ministry for six years. He was then assigned to the political section of the permanent mission to the United Nations in New York with the rank of third secretary, and later second secretary, from May 2006 to October 2009. During this period, he served under permanent representatives Rezlan Ishar Jenie and Marty Natalegawa. In 2007, he completed a non-degree UNITAR fellowship program in international law and legal Studies for UN diplomats, which was organized by UNITAR and Columbia Law School.

Following Marty Natalegawa's appointment as foreign minister in October 2009, Hari followed him and served as his private secretary. He served until February 2013 and was then placed overseas at the economic section of the embassy in Tokyo with the rank of first secretary, and later counsellor. He served until August 2016.

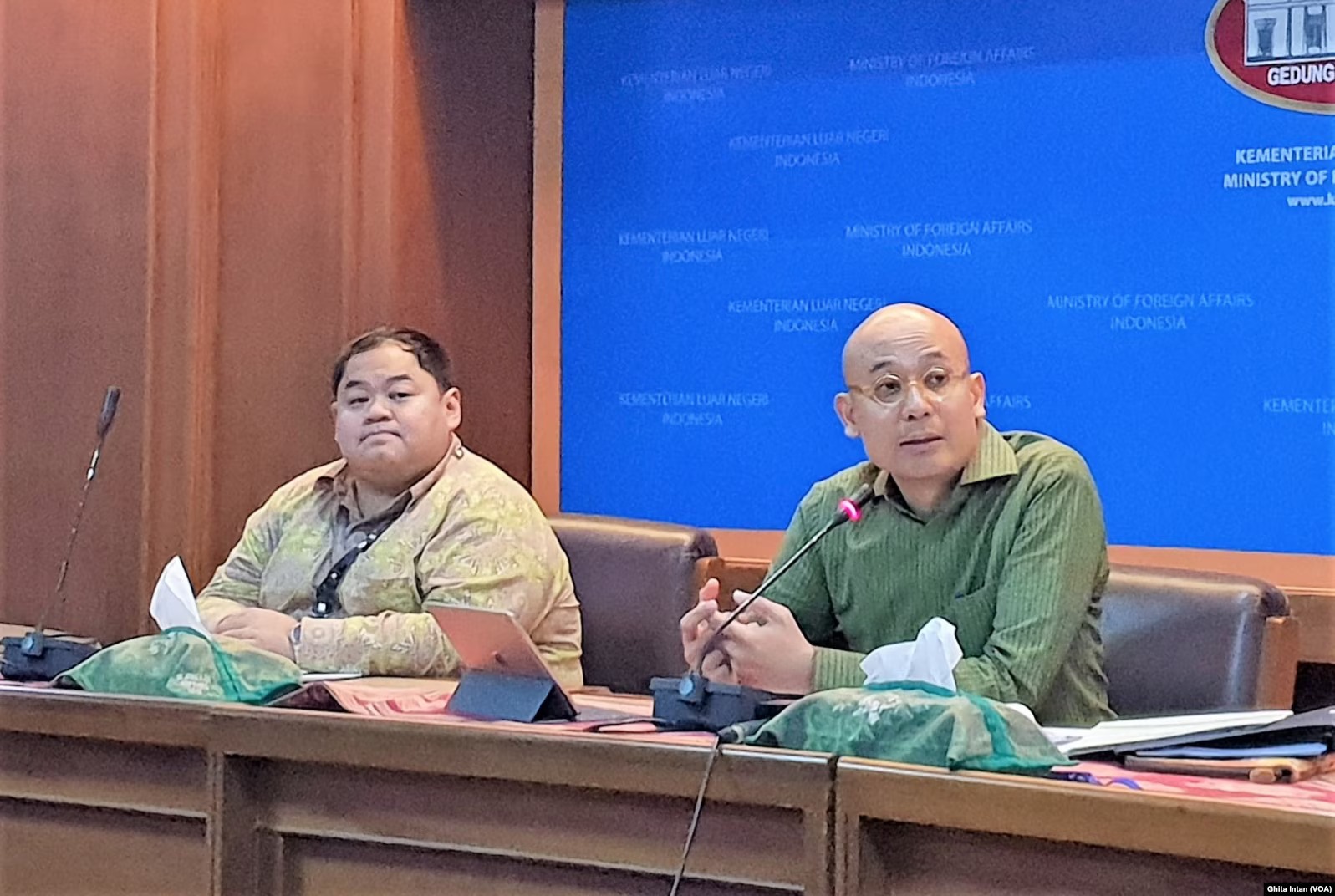
Hari Prabowo (left) as Indonesia's UNSC taskforce coordinator, 2019.

From January 2017 to September 2018, Hari served as deputy director (chief of subdirectorate) for sustainable development and climate change cooperation in the foreign ministry. During Indonesia's non-permanent membership in the United Nations Security Council from 2018 to 2019, Hari was tasked to coordinate Indonesia's UNSC task force. Hari supported efforts in reforming the UNSC's working methods.

After serving in the UNSC task force, in September 2019 Hari became the director of trade, commodities, and intellectual property in the foreign ministry. In his capacity as director, Hari was involved in efforts to counter anti-palm oil campaign. Hari sent a diplomatic note to the World Health Organization after its branch in the Eastern Mediterranean issued an infographic that advised adults to avoid food that used, among all others, palm oil. After serving for two years in the role, in February 2021 he was appointed as director of development, economy, and environmental affairs. During Indonesia's presidency of the G20 from 2021 to 2022, Hari became Indonesia's co-sous sherpa, during which he worked to introduce Indonesia's presidency of the G20 to various regions in Indonesia.

In January 2023, Hari became the deputy permanent representative to the United Nations. Upon the appointment of Arrmanatha Nasir as deputy foreign minister in October 2024, Hari became the permanent mission's chargé d'affaires ad interim until the appointment of Umar Hadi as permanent representative. Hari argued that the United Nations is facing a liquidity crisis and requires urgent reform to remain relevant and effective.

Hari was nominated as ambassador to Thailand by President Prabowo Subianto in July 2025. After undergoing an assessment by the House of Representative's first committee on 6 July, his nomination was approved two days later. He was sworn in as ambassador on 19 December 2025 and received his duties from chargé d'affaires ad interim Fuad Adriansyah on 14 March 2026. He presented his letter of introduction to the executive secretary of the United Nations Economic and Social Commission for Asia and the Pacific Armida Alisjahbana on 17 April 2026 and credentials to King Vajiralongkorn on 22 June 2026.
