= Arrmanatha Nasir =

Indonesian diplomat (born 1971)

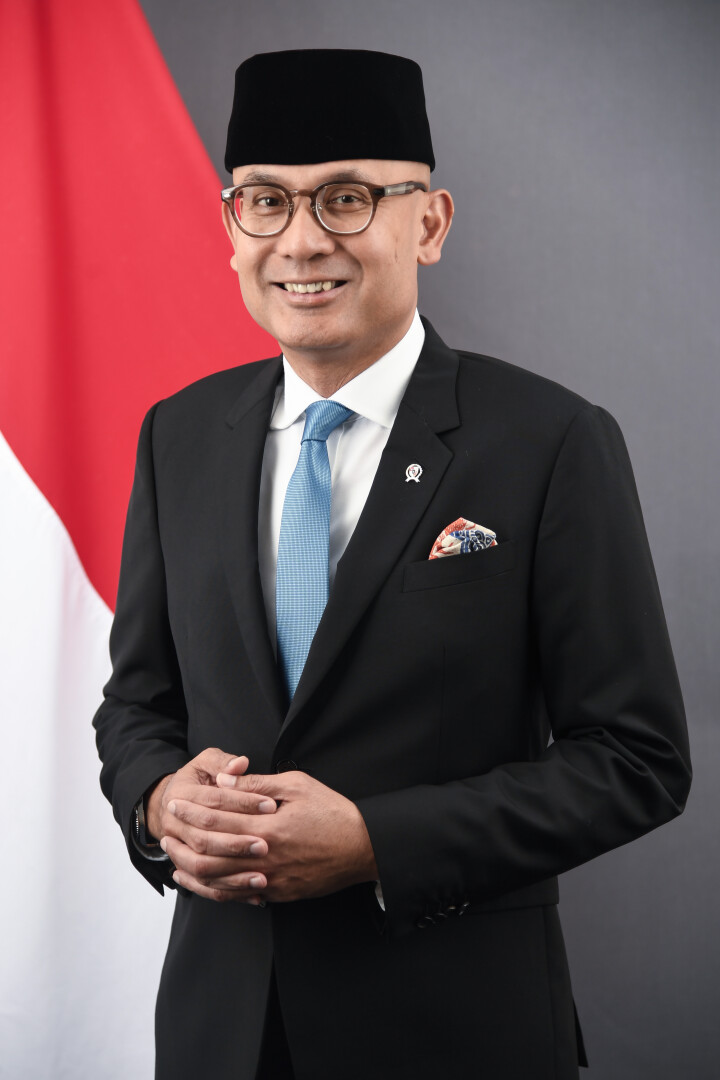
- Official portrait, 2024

Minister for Foreign Affairs
- Incumbent
- Assumed office 1 October 2026
- President: Prabowo Subianto
- Preceded by: Sugiono

Vice Minister of Foreign Affairs
- In office 21 October 2024 – 1 October 2026 Serving with Anis Matta and Arif Havas Oegroseno
- President: Prabowo Subianto
- Preceded by: Pahala Mansury

Permanent Representative of Indonesia to the United Nations
- In office 25 October 2021 – 21 October 2024
- President: Joko Widodo
- Preceded by: Dian Triansyah Djani
- Succeeded by: Hari Prabowo (acting); Umar Hadi

19th Ambassador of Indonesia to France
- In office 12 April 2019 – 24 November 2021
- President: Joko Widodo
- Preceded by: Hotmangaradja Pandjaitan
- Succeeded by: Mohamad Oemar

Chief of Staff to the Foreign Minister
- In office December 2014 – January 2019
- President: Joko Widodo
- Minister: Retno Marsudi
- Preceded by: Michael Tene
- Succeeded by: Achmad Rizal Purnama

Personal details
- Born: December 30, 1971 (age 54) Bangkok, Thailand
- Spouse: Nur Indah Sari (m. 2001)
- Children: 3
- Education: University of Buckingham (BA); Leicester University (MBA); University of Indonesia (M.Si.)
- Awards: Commander of the Legion of Honour (2021)

Arrmanatha Christiawan Nasir (born 30 December 1971) is an Indonesian career diplomat serving as Indonesia's foreign minister since 2026. Prior to his current position, Arrmanatha served in a number of diplomatic roles, including as ambassador to France from 2019 to 2021, permanent representative to the United Nations from 2021 to 2024, and most recently, deputy foreign minister from 2024 to 2026.

== Early life and education ==
Arrmanatha was born on 30 December 1971 in Bangkok, Thailand. Arrmanatha spent his early childhood up until primary school in the United States. Arrmanatha returned to Indonesia for middle school, where according to him he was often ridiculed by his peers as "geeky" and "arrogant" for his rudimentary Indonesian and his lack of understanding in informal Indonesian. After finishing middle school, Arrmanatha followed his parents to United Kingdom and attended Whitefield School in London, where he completed his GCSE and A Levels in 1989. He the continued his higher education at the University of Buckingham, where he acquired bachelor's degree in economics in 1993, and a Master of Business Administration from Leicester University in 1994.

== Diplomatic career ==
After completing his education overseas, Arrmanatha immediately returned to work in Indonesia. He began his career working for Bank Danamon as an account executive from 1995 to 1996 and for Bank Dagang Negara as correspondent banking from 1996 to 1997. He was then admitted to the foreign ministry as the 23th cohort of the basic diplomatic training in 1997. Arrmanatha was put in charge of the desk for operations of UN economic and social bodies, serving until 2001.

Arrmanatha received his first overseas posting at the permanent mission to the United Nations and the World Trade Organizations in Geneva sometime between late 2001 and early 2002. He was assigned to the permanent mission's second economic division, which was responsible for international trade matters, with the diplomatic rank of third secretary. He represented Indonesia in negotiations on agriculture related matters within the World Trade Organization, Trade-Related Aspects of Intellectual Property Rights (TRIPs), and Trade and Environment during the WTO Doha Development Agenda trade round. After four years of posting in Geneva, Arrmanatha returned to Indonesia to take up office as deputy director for agriculture and commodities within the-then newly established directorate general of multilateral affairs in 2005. Around the same period, he was also the secretary of Indonesia's G33 national task force.

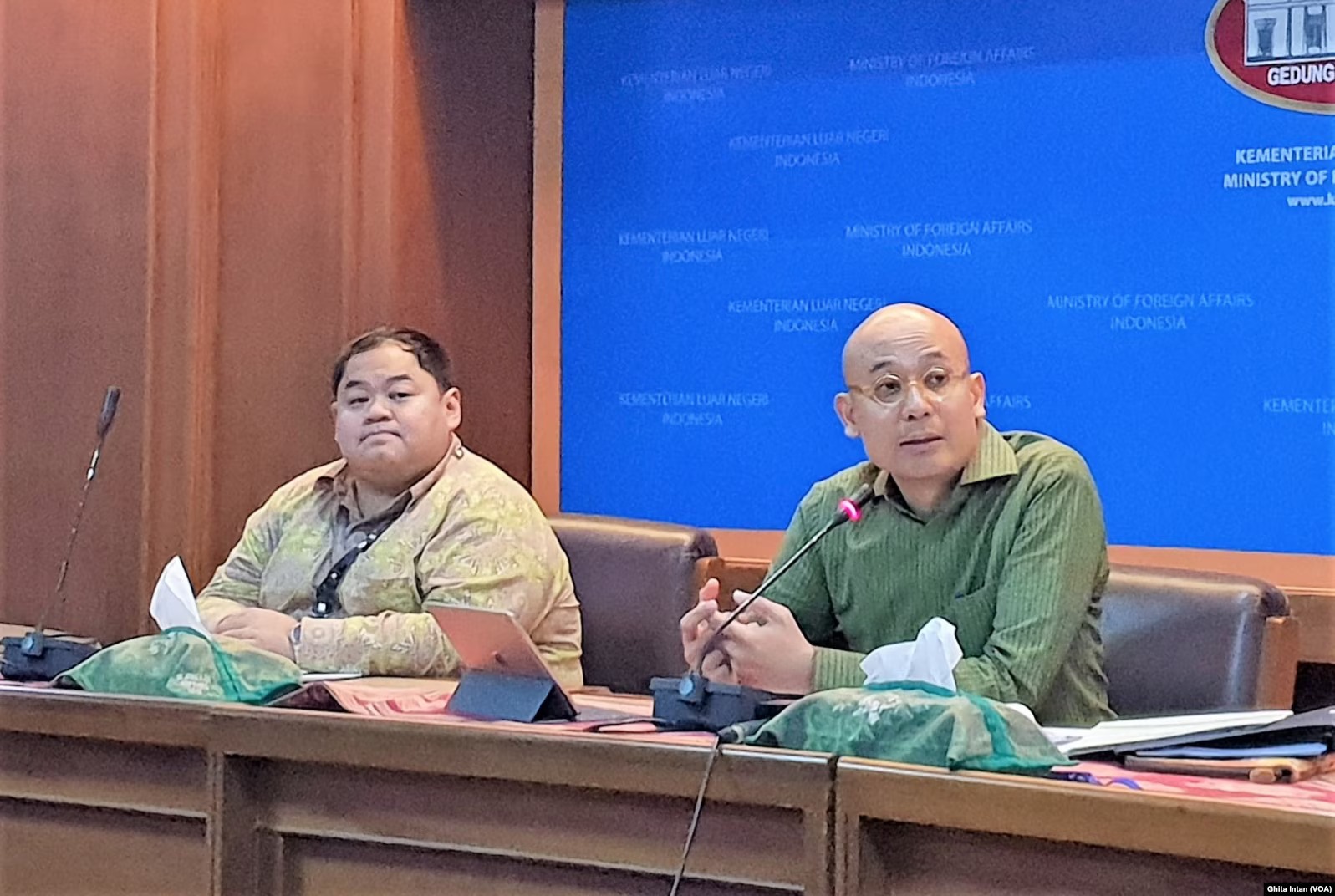
Arrmanatha (right) as the foreign ministry's spokesperson in 2019.

Following his domestic stint, in 2008 he was sent to the first economic section of the permanent mission to the United Nations in New York with the rank of first secretary. He was Indonesia's representative in the United Nations General Assembly Second Committee on economics and development issues, taking part in debates relating to Least Developed Countries. He also took part in negotiating and formulating resolutions on behalf of the Group of 77 and China within the United Nations Economic and Social Council. During the 65th session of the United Nations General Assembly from 2010 to 2011, Arrmanatha was the advisor to the General Assembly's president Joseph Deiss on economic issues and least developed countries. From New York, Arrmanatha returned to Jakarta to take up office as the officer-in-charge of economic, finance, and development matters within the office of foreign minister Marty Natalegawa in 2012. After Retno Marsudi replaced Marty, Retno appointed Arrmanatha as her chief of staff and, concurrently, the foreign ministry's spokesperson, which gained him public recognition. He served in this role until July 2019, a few months before the end of Retno's first ministerial term.

=== Ambassador to France and UNESCO ===
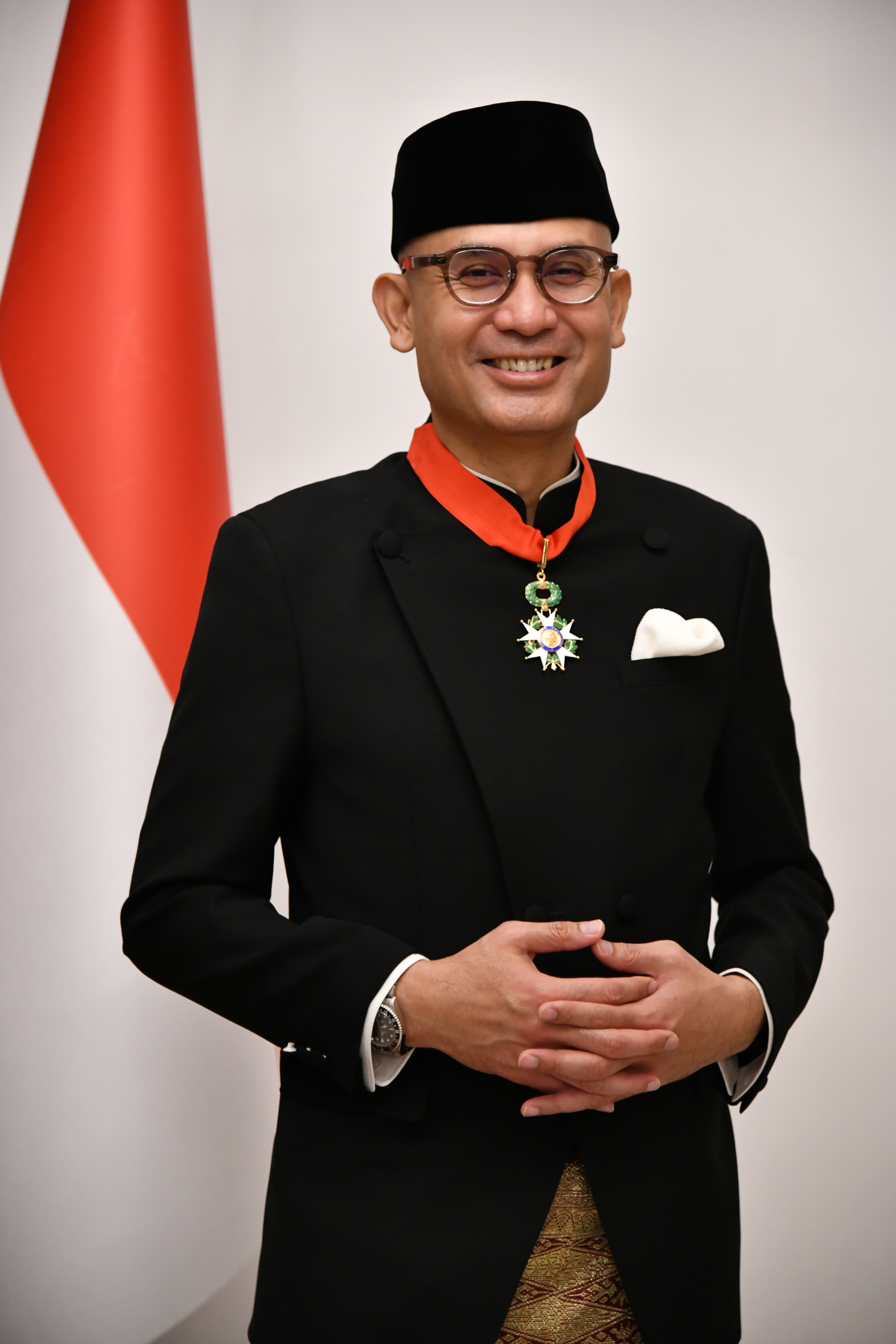
Arrmanatha Christiawan Nasir wearing his Legion of Honour cordon.

In September 2018, President Joko Widodo nominated Arrmanatha for ambassador to France, with concurrent accreditation to Andorra, Monaco, and the UNESCO. After passing an assessment held by the House of Representative's first commission in October, on 7 January 2019 he was installed as ambassador. He presented his credentials to President of France and Co-Prince of Andorra Emmanuel Macron on 12 April 2019, Director General of UNESCO Audrey Azoulay on 10 September 2019, Albert II of Monaco on 5 November 2019, and Co-prince of Andorra Joan Enric Vives i Sicília on 8 November 2019. During his tenure, Arrmanatha directed Indonesia's bid for UNESCO's Man and the Biosphere Programme council and the declaration of Lake Toba in North Sumatra as a global geopark. Arrmanatha also oversaw the strengthening of defence cooperation with France, marked by recurring visits from the-then defense minister Prabowo Subianto with his French counterpart throughout his term. At the end of his ambassadorial term, on 17 November 2021 Arrmanatha was conferred the Commander of the Legion of Honour, the highest French order.

=== Permanent Representative to the UN and ISA ===
In February 2021, Arrmanatha was nominated as Indonesia's permanent representative to the United Nations in New York. After passing the House of Representatives assessment in July, he was installed on 25 October 2021. He departed France for New York in late November 2021 and presented his credentials to the Secretary-General of the United Nations António Guterres on 4 January 2022. Arrmanatha, who was also accredited to the International Seabed Authority, became Indonesia's first ambassador for the organization upon presenting his credentials to the Secretary-General of the International Seabed Authority Michael W. Lodge on 25 July 2023. During his tenure in New York, Arrmanatha held leadership roles in a number of UN deliberative bodies, including as the vice chair of the UN Palestinian Rights Committee, vice-chair of the Special Committee on Decolonization, vice president of the United Nations Economic and Social Council, and the co-facilitator of the political declaration of the midterm review on the implementation of Sendai Framework for Disaster Risk Reduction.

=== Vice foreign minister ===
Arrmanatha meeting with Chief Adviser of Bangladesh Muhammad Yunus, 2025.

Arrmanatha (left) with UNCTAD secretary general Rebeca Grynspan at the 16th session of the United Nations Conference on Trade and Development, 2025.

Arrmanatha was installed as the vice foreign minister within President Prabowo Subianto's Red and White Cabinet on 21 October 2024, alongside with two other vice ministers Arif Havas Oegroseno and Anis Matta. Six days before his inauguration, Arrmanatha was summoned to Prabowo's residence at Hambalang, where he discussed with Prabowo on global issues, opportunities, and challenges. In a meeting with the House of Representative's first commission on December that year, Arrmanatha was assigned by foreign minister Sugiono to handle the internal management of the foreign ministry and multilateral issues. Wendy A. Prajuli, international relations lecturer at the BINUS University, viewed Arrmanatha's appointment as Prabowo's attempt at counterbalancing the bilateral tendencies in his foreign ministry, given Arrmanatha's tenure in various multilateral agencies.

Arrmanatha continued to retain some of his ad-hoc position within the United Nations, retaining the vice-chairmanship of the UN Palestinian Rights Committee until 2025. In an emergency session of the 79th session of the United Nations General Assembly in December 2024, Arrmanatha condemned the dual standards implemented throughout the resolution of Gaza war as a disruption towards the multilateral system. He emphasized Indonesia's commitment towards the two-state solution in 2025 as a form of support for a Palestine that stands "equal amongst the community of nations".

=== Foreign minister ===
On 1 October 2026, Arrmanatha was installed as the foreign minister, replacing Sugiono. According to Arrmanatha, he was informed of his appointment just two hours before the inauguration ceremony by cabinet secretary Teddy Indra Wijaya. Upon his inauguration, Arrmanatha pledged to put emphasis on Indonesia's national interests and advancing Indonesia's United Nations Security Council nonpermanent membership bid. Arrmanatha emphasized the continuation of the free and active foreign policy as well as priority programs carried out by his predecessor Sugiono. China's foreign minister Wang Yi congratulated Arrmanatha's appointment to the position a week after he was installed.

A number of international relations observers responded to Arrmanatha's appointment as foreign minister positively. Foreign Policy Community of Indonesia chair and former vice foreign minister Dino Patti Djalal viewed his appointment as a correct move, as Sugiono's position as the ruling party's secretary general made him unable to divide his schedule between managing the party and the foreign ministry, while BRIN observer Wasisto Raharjo Jati viewed Arrmanatha's appointment as a regular move and an attempt at restoring meritocracy within the diplomatic service. Radityo Dharmaputra and Mohamad Rezky Utama, observers from Airlangga University and the Universitas Islam Indonesia, respectively, was skeptical about Arrmanatha's ability in influencing Indonesia's foreign ministry given Prabowo's direct, hands-on involvement in managing foreign relations.

== Personal life ==
Arrmanatha is married to Nur Indah Sari in 2001 and has two sons and a daughters. In early 2020, amidst the lockdown measures implemented by the French government to limit the spread of COVID-19 in the country, Nur was fined 135 euro for going out with an activity permit without a definite date.
