= Roy Soemirat =

Indonesian diplomat

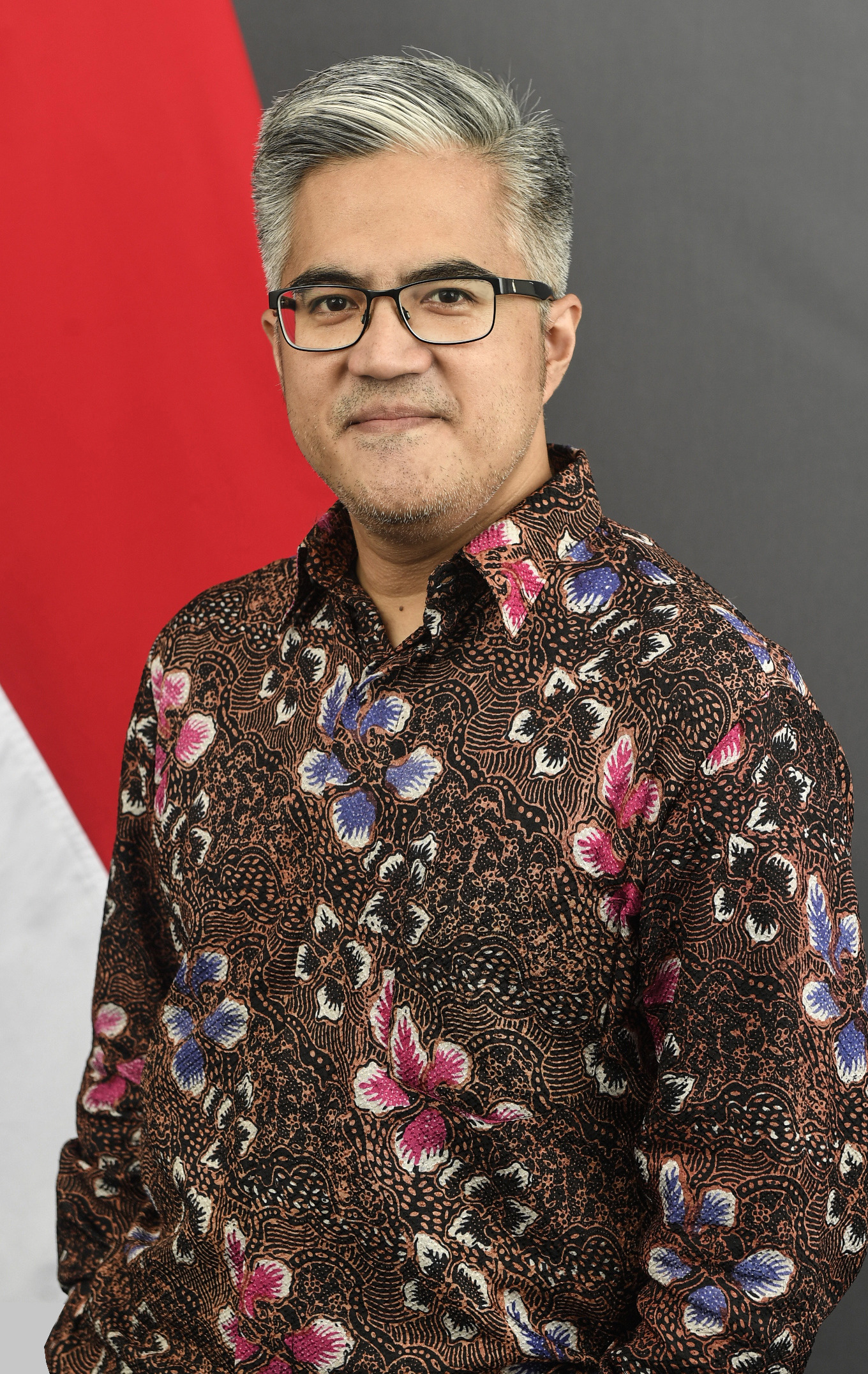

Ambassador of Indonesia to Iran
- Incumbent
- Assumed office 24 March 2025
- President: Prabowo Subianto
- Preceded by: Ronny Prasetyo Yuliantoro

Chief of Staff to the Foreign Minister
- In office 16 May 2024 – 9 September 2025
- Preceded by: Achmad Rizal Purnama
- Succeeded by: Yvonne Mewengkang

Personal details
- Education: Padjadjaran University; University of Indonesia

Rolliansyah "Roy" Soemirat is an Indonesian diplomat who is currently serving as the Ambassador of Indonesia to Iran and the spokesperson of the foreign ministry.

== Education ==
Soemirat began studying at the Padjadjaran University in 1993, later receiving his bachelor's degree in international relations. He holds a master's degree in international relations from the University of Indonesia.

== Career ==
Soemirat joined the diplomatic service in March 2000. His initial assignment was at the Directorate of International Security and Disarmament. He then served at Indonesia's permanent mission to the UN in New York as third secretary and later first secretary. During the 2008 membership of Indonesia in the UN's security council, Soemirat was appointed as alternate representative of Indonesia on the security council.

In 2012, he was investigated by the Corruption Eradication Commission as a witness in a corruption case involving foreign ministry secretary general Sudjadnan Parnohadiningrat. Soemirat's diplomatic service continued with him being the Indonesian lead negotiator for the adoption of the Sendai Framework for Disaster Risk Reduction in 2015. He later served as counsellor for political affairs at Indonesia's permanent mission to the UN.

On 6 October 2020, Soemirat assumed office as the Director for International Security and Disarmament Affairs. During his tenure, he coordinated with Indonesia's National Narcotics Agency for the United Nations Commission on Narcotic and Drugs's session in April 2021. He was transferred to the ASEAN directorate general in 2022, where he became the director for ASEAN political and security cooperation. During Indonesia's chairmanship of the G20, Soemirat became the chair of the Anti-Corruption Working Group along with Mochamad Hadiyana from the Corruption Eradication Commission.

On 16 May 2024, Soemirat became the chief of strategic support bureau to foreign minister Retno Marsudi. He was later designated as the foreign ministry's second spokesperson, serving alongside the main spokesperson Muhammad Iqbal.

In August 2024, President Joko Widodo nominated Soemirat as Indonesia's ambassador to Iran, with concurrent accreditation to Turkmenistan. He passed a fit and proper test held by the House of Representative's first commission in September that year. He was installed by President Prabowo Subianto on 24 March 2025. Following the Twelve-Day War between Iran and Israel, Soemirat directly coordinated the foreign ministry's efforts in evacuating Indonesian citizens. A total of 97 citizens were transported to the Azerbaijan–Iran border town of Astara before being flown to Baku. On 4 August 2025, he received his duties from chargé d'affaires ad interim Elbanita Ruru. Eight days later, he presented copies of his credentials to foreign minister Abbas Araghchi. He handed over his credentials to the President of Iran Masoud Pezeshkian on 7 October 2025 and Chairman of the Assembly of Turkmenistan Dünýägözel Gulmanowa on 17 February 2026.
