= Indonesia–Turkey relations =

- Indonesia: Turkey

Diplomatic mission
- Embassy of Indonesia, Ankara: Embassy of Turkey, Jakarta

Indonesia-Turkey relations refers to diplomatic relations between Turkey and Indonesia. Indonesia and Turkey established diplomatic relations in 1950. Indonesia has an embassy in Ankara and consulate-general in Istanbul. Turkey has an embassy in Jakarta, and honorary consulate in Medan since May 1996. Both countries are full members of the World Trade Organization (WTO), Organisation of Islamic Cooperation (OIC), D-8 Organization for Economic Cooperation, MIKTA and the G-20 major economies.

== History ==
=== Relations with the Sultanate of Aceh ===
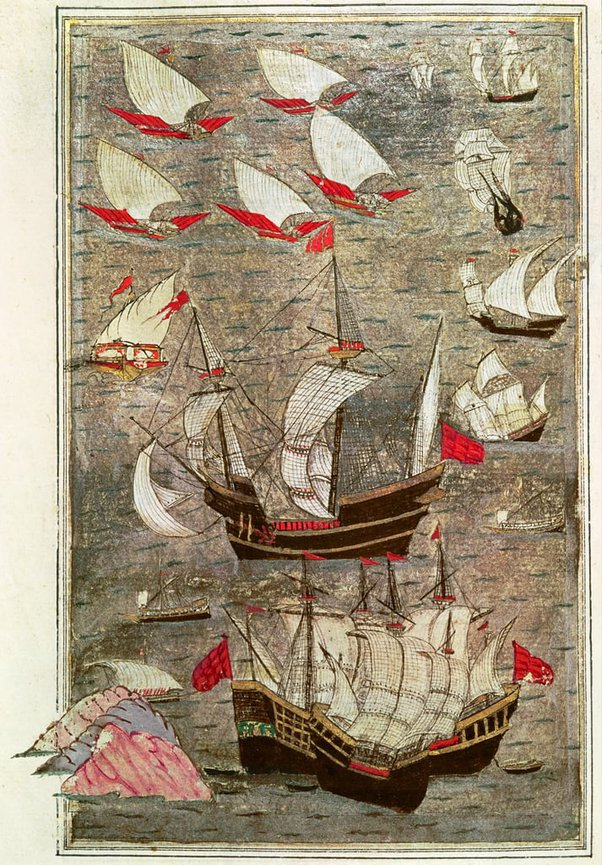
Ottoman fleet in the Indian Ocean 16th century

Relations with the Ottoman Empire (Turkey's predecessor state) began with the 16th century Ottoman expedition to Aceh, in with the response to the Aceh Sultanate's request for assistance against the Portuguese in Malacca. Ottoman's relations with the kingdoms in Indonesia archipelago formally began when the then Sultan of Aceh Alauddin Riayat Syah al-Kahhar (1539–1571) sent an envoy to sultan Suleiman the Magnificent in 1564. Sultan Alauddin wanted to develop this relationship, both for efforts expulsion of colonial powers such as the Portuguese in Malacca, as well as to expand their power in Sumatra.

After the death of Suleiman the Magnificent in 1566, his son Selim II ordered ships to be sent to Aceh. But only two ships finally arrived in Aceh in 1566–1567, but many other fleets and shipments followed. The first expedition was led by Kurtoğlu Hızır Reis. The Acehnese paid for the shipment in gold, pearls, diamonds and rubies. When the Ottomans fought against Russia in 1853, the Sultan of Aceh Alauddin Ibrahim Mansur Syah sent 10,000 Spanish dollars in war aid to the Sultan of Ottoman at that time Abdul Mejid I.

When the Aceh sultanate was attacked by the Dutch in 1873, which sparked the Aceh War, the Aceh sultanate requested protection from a previous agreement with the Ottoman Empire. Once again Aceh asked for military assistance from the Ottoman Empire, but the Ottoman fleet assigned to assist was diverted to Yemen because there was a Zaydi rebellion there.

=== Modern Era ===
Turkiye recognized Indonesia on 29 December 1949. Diplomatic relations were established in 1950. Turkish Embassy in Jakarta was opened on 10 April 1957.

In April 2011, Turkish President Abdullah Gül paid a state visit to Indonesia. The welcoming ceremony for President Abdullah Gül was carried out with a state ceremony held at the Merdeka Palace, April 5, 2011. During the visit, bilateral talks between the two countries were held. Bilateral talks between President Susilo Bambang Yudhoyono and President Abdullah Gül focused on follow-up as an effort to increase bilateral cooperation in various sectors. Two countries signed a strategic partnership, with the Turkish President declaring that "a new era is beginning with Indonesia."

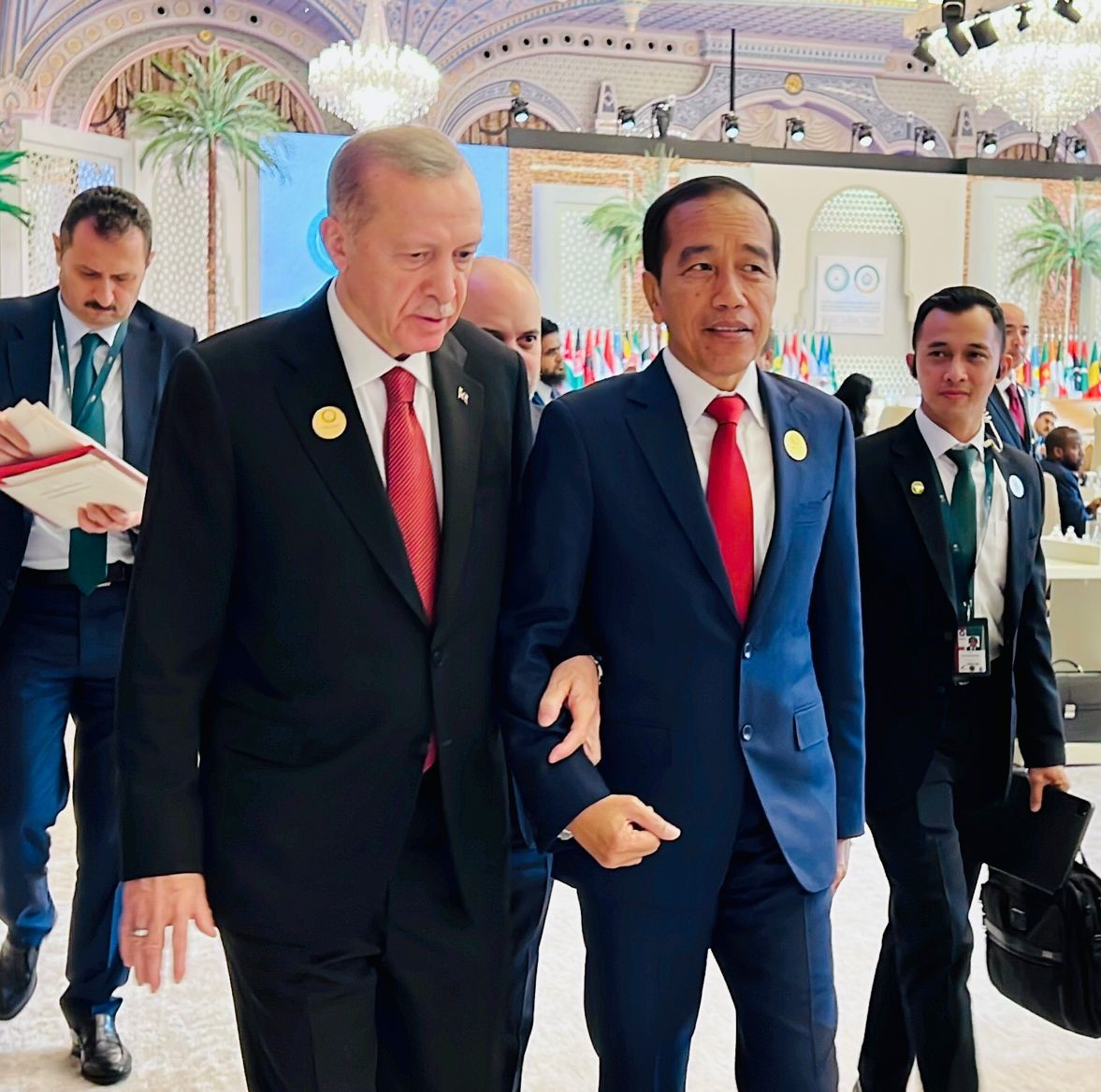
Erdoğan and Jokowi at the Extraordinary Summit of the Organization of Islamic Cooperation in Riyadh, Saudi Arabia in November 2023.

In 2017, President Joko Widodo paid a state visit to Ankara, Turkey. Indonesia and Turkey signed two agreements during President Joko Widodo's two-day visit to Turkey. The signing ceremony of the healthcare agreement and launching of economic negotiations to establish the Indonesia-Turkey Comprehensive Economic Partnership Agreement (IT-CEPA) witnessed by Jokowi and Turkish President Recep Tayyip Erdoğan. President Jokowi's visit in 2017 was also to discuss the cooperation between Indonesia and Turkey.

Entering the 2020s decade, relations between Türkiye and Indonesia are increasingly strengthening. Especially because of President Erdoğan's foreign policy towards Indonesia. The strengthening of this relationship is marked by several economic agreements such as the IT-CEPA economic agreement which has begun to be implemented. As well as increasing military and technology trade agreements between the Turkish and Indonesian governments.

On July 26, 2025 Indonesia became the first country to buy Turkey's Kaan fighter jets. The deal, according to reports is estimated at $10 billion for 48 aircraft.

== High-level Visits ==
Guest	Host	Place of visit	Date of visit
(Turkey) Deputy Prime Minister Fatin Rüştü Zorlu	(Indonesia) President Sukarno	Bandung	March–April, 1955
(Indonesia) President Sukarno	(Turkey) President Celal Bayar	Ankara and Istanbul	April 24–29, 1959
(Turkey) President Kenan Evren	(Indonesia) President Soeharto	Jakarta	September 1982
(Indonesia) President Soeharto	(Turkey) President Kenan Evren	Çankaya Köşkü, Ankara	September 14, 1985
(Turkey) Prime Minister Necmettin Erbakan	(Indonesia) President Soeharto	Jakarta and Bandung	August, 1996
(Turkey) Prime Minister Recep Tayyip Erdoğan	(Indonesia) President Susilo Bambang Yudhoyono	Jakarta and Aceh	February 6–7, 2005
(Turkey) Prime Minister Recep Tayyip Erdoğan	(Indonesia) President Susilo Bambang Yudhoyono	Bali	May 13–14, 2006
(Indonesia) President Susilo Bambang Yudhoyono	(Turkey) President Abdullah Gül	Ankara	June 28, 2010
(Turkey) President Abdullah Gül	(Indonesia) President Susilo Bambang Yudhoyono	Merdeka Palace, Jakarta	April 5, 2011
(Turkey) Prime Minister Recep Tayyip Erdoğan	(Indonesia) President Susilo Bambang Yudhoyono	Bali	November 6–9, 2012
(Turkey) President Recep Tayyip Erdoğan	(Indonesia) President Joko Widodo	Merdeka Palace, Jakarta	July 30 - August 1, 2015
(Indonesia) President Joko Widodo	(Turkey) President Recep Tayyip Erdoğan	Antalya	November 15–16, 2015
(Indonesia) President Joko Widodo	(Turkey) President Recep Tayyip Erdoğan	Presidential Complex, Ankara	July 6, 2017
(Indonesia) Vice President Jusuf Kalla	(Turkey) President Recep Tayyip Erdoğan	Istanbul	October 19–20, 2017
(Turkey) President Recep Tayyip Erdoğan	(Indonesia) President Joko Widodo	G20 Summit, Bali	November 14–16, 2022
(Turkey) President Recep Tayyip Erdoğan	(Indonesia) President Prabowo Subianto	Bogor Palace, West Java	February 11–12, 2025
(Indonesia) President Prabowo Subianto	(Turkey) President Recep Tayyip Erdoğan	Ankara and Antalya	April 9–11, 2025

== See also ==
- Ottoman expedition to Aceh
- List of diplomatic missions of Indonesia
- List of diplomatic missions in Turkey
