= Michael Tene =

Indonesian diplomat

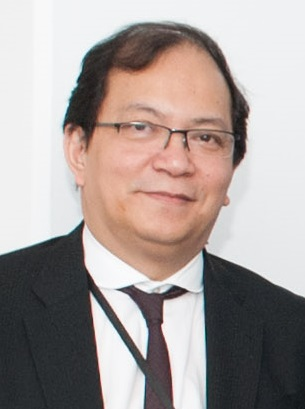

Deputy Secretary General of ASEAN for Political Security Community
- In office 15 February 2021 – 14 February 2024
- Preceded by: Hoàng Anh Tuấn
- Succeeded by: Dato’ Astanah Abdul Aziz

Deputy Secretary General of ASEAN for Community and Corporate Affairs
- In office 2 September 2019 – 15 February 2021
- Preceded by: Ahmad Kurnia Prawira Mochtan
- Succeeded by: Tran Duc Binh

Chief of Staff to the Foreign Minister
- In office August 2010 – December 2014
- Preceded by: Teuku Faizasyah
- Succeeded by: Arrmanatha Nasir

Personal details
- Education: University of Indonesia (S.E.); National Graduate Institute for Policy Studies (MA)

Robert Matheus Michael Tene is an Indonesian diplomat who served as the deputy secretary general of ASEAN for community and corporate affairs from 2019 to 2021 and for political security community from 2021 to 2024. Prior to assuming office as ASEAN's deputy secretary general, Tene served as the chief of staff to the foreign minister and deputy permanent representative to the UN, WTO, and other international organizations in Geneva.

== Education ==
Tene studied economics at the University of Indonesia. He received his undergraduate degree in 1992, with a thesis on the effect of tariff policies in developed countries to forest exploitation. His thesis examiner, the environment and population minister Emil Salim, had just finished attending a cabinet meeting but still made time to attend Tene's defense.

Tene later pursued a master's in public administration from the National Graduate Institute for Policy Studies in Tokyo, Japan, graduating in 2003 under the Young Leaders Program scholarship.

== Career ==
Tene began his career in the foreign ministry in 1994 after completing his basic diplomatic education. His diplomatic career began as a staff member at the Non-Aligned Movement (GNB) executive office, serving under ambassador Nana Sutresna. He later served at the national ASEAN secretariat as a staff at its economic bureau and later attached to its secretary from 1995 to 1997.

From 1997 to early 2001, he was posted to the embassy in London, where he acted as an observer for the referendum on East Timor in the European region, which was held in Lisbon. After his studies in Japan, he served as a staff at the directorate of ASEAN political and security affairs for a year before being appointed as the deputy director (chief of subdirectorate) of ASEAN political cooperation from 2003 to 2005.

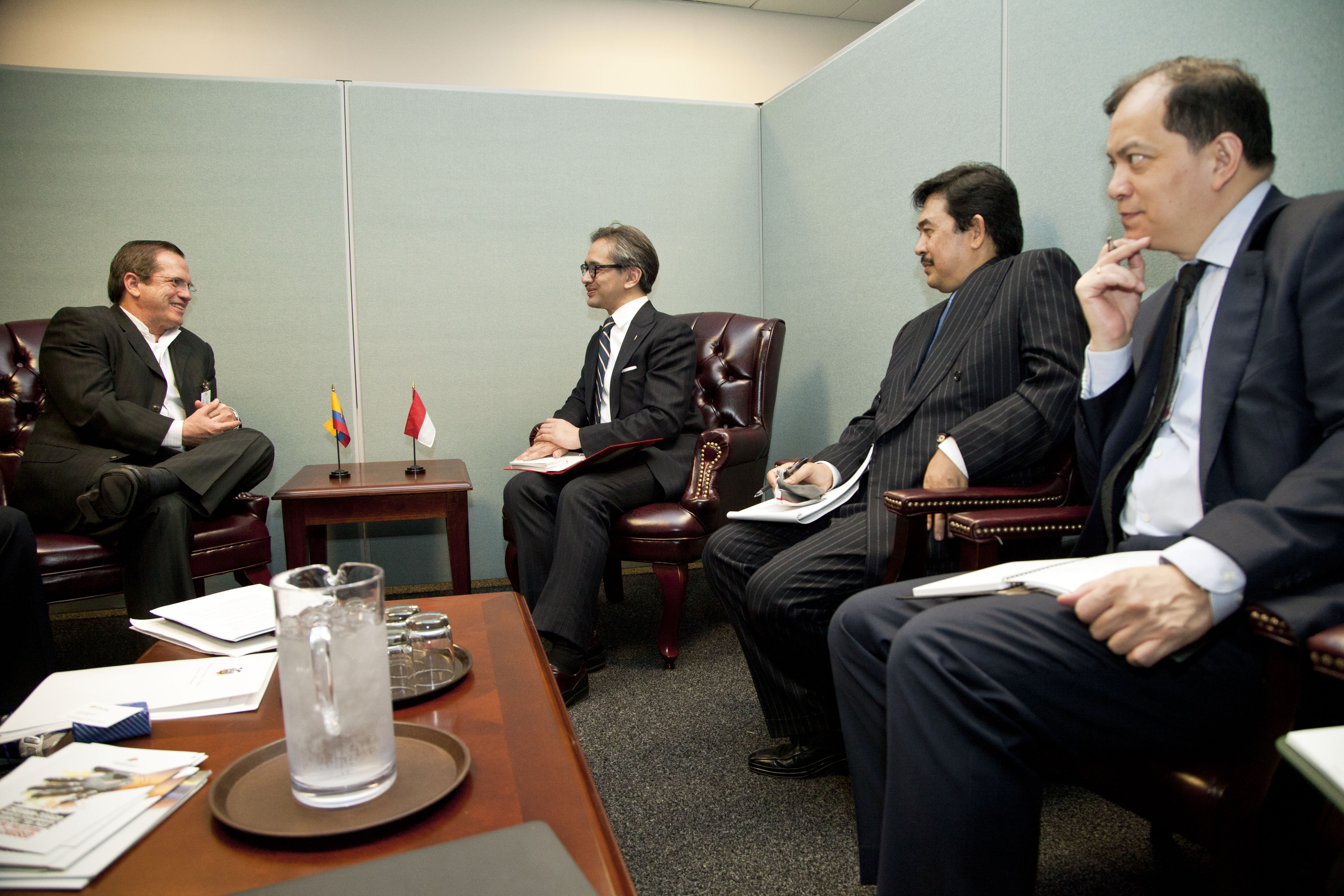
Tene (right) accompanying foreign minister Marty Natalegawa in a meeting with his Ecuadorian counterpart, 2013.

From the late 2005 to 2009, Tene was assigned to the embassy in Washington D.C., where his main task was to build relationships with the U.S. Congress. He briefly became the deputy director (chief of subdirectorate) of civil and political rights for a few months in 2010 before being appointed as chief of staff to foreign minister Marty Natalegawa in early August 2010 (his official title was as the chief of the minister administration bureau). In his role, he also acted as the foreign ministry's spokesperson. He served in this position until he was replaced by Arrmanatha Nasir in December 2014.

From 2015 to 2018, Tene served as the deputy permanent representative to the UN in Geneva with the rank of ambassador. In the mid-2017, Tene became chargé d'affaires ad interim of the mission. Upon returning to Indonesia, Tene was attached to the ASEAN cooperation directorate general.

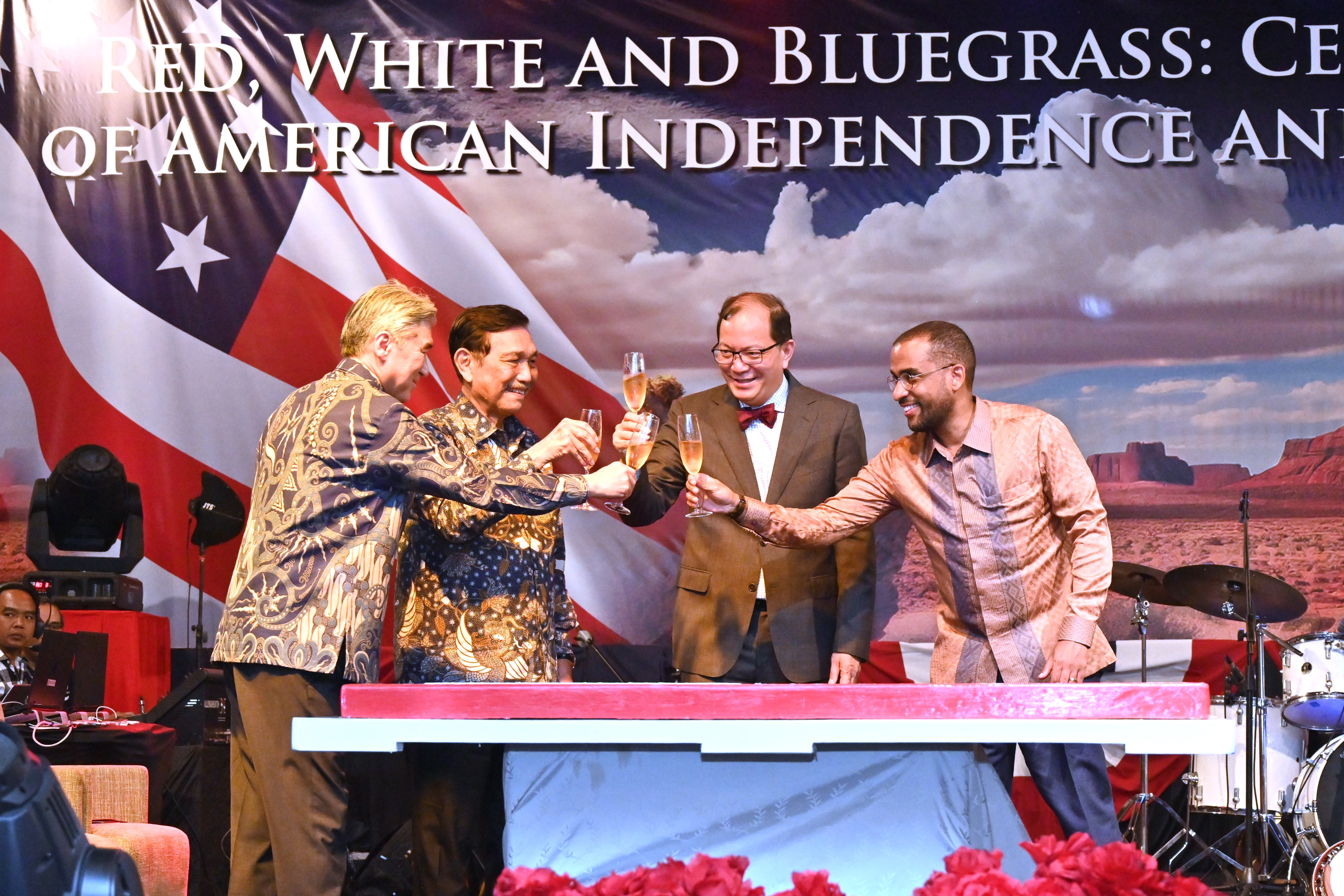
Tene (2nd from right) at the 247th anniversary of U.S. independence in Jakarta in 2023.

On 2 September 2019, Tene became the deputy secretary general of ASEAN for community and corporate affairs, replacing Ahmad Kurnia Prawira Mochtan. He served for about a year, and on 15 February 2021 his portfolio was changed to the deputy secretary general for political security community, with Vietnamese Tran Duc Binh as his replacement. As deputy secretary general, Tene is responsible for supporting implementation of the ASEAN Political Security Community Blueprint and strengthening ties with dialogue partners. Tene argued that ASEAN had progressed significantly since its establishment but needs to adapt with the global environment. Tene's tenure in ASEAN ended on 14 February 2024 and he returned to the foreign ministry as a senior advisor. He is currently an honorary member of the Romanian Institute for Europe-Asia Studies (IRSEA) and a senior fellow at the Foreign Policy Community of Indonesia (FPCI).

== Personal life ==
Tene has a hobby of swimming and jogging and enjoys reading.
