= Embassy of Indonesia, Ankara =

Embassy of the Republic of Indonesia in Ankara Kedutaan Besar Republik Indonesia di Ankara Endonezya Cumhuriyeti Ankara Büyükelçiliği

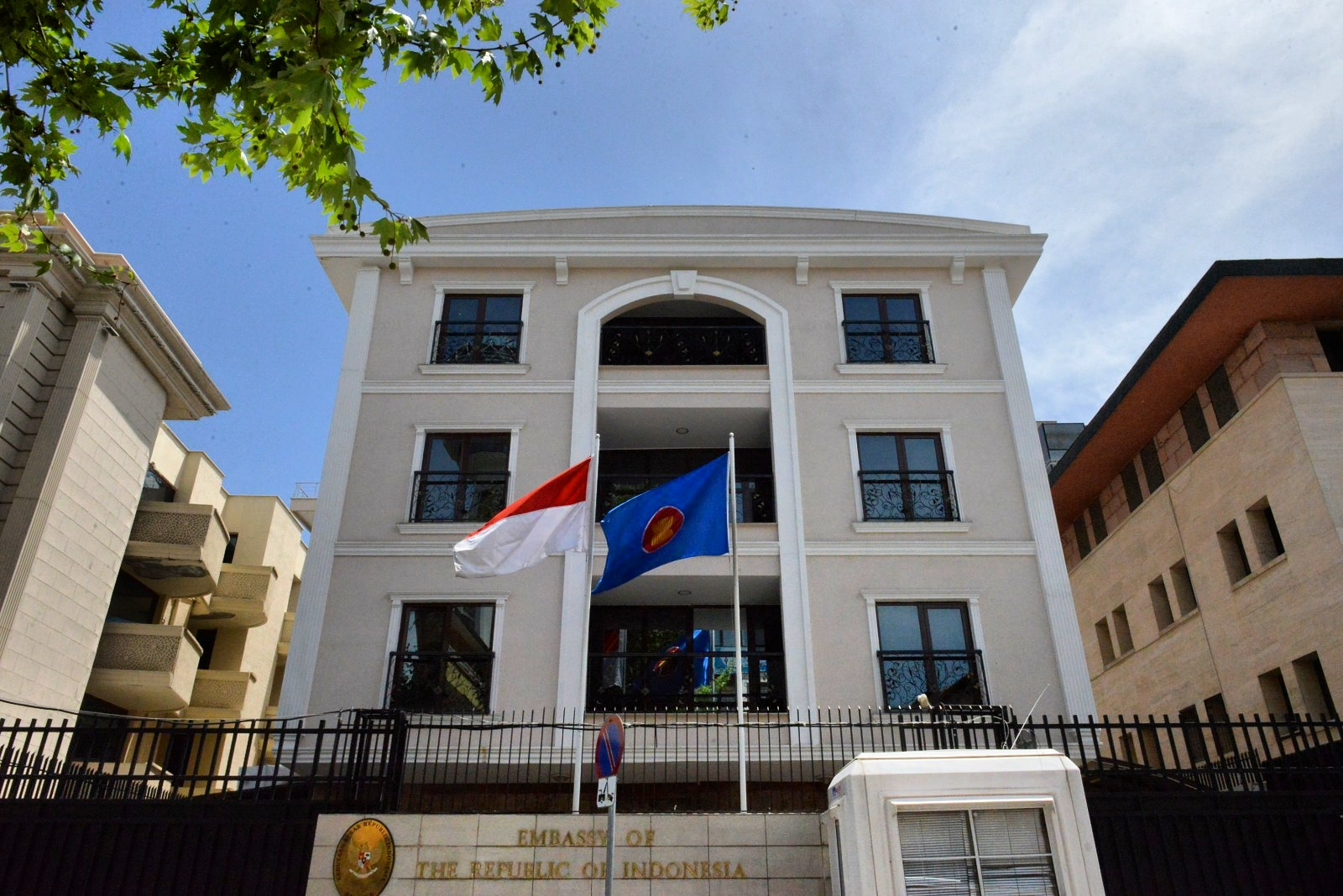
- Location: Ankara, Turkey
- Address: Sukarno Caddesi (Hollanda Caddesi), No. 24/1; Çankaya 06650 Ankara, Turkey
- Coordinates: 39.87077877200247°N 32.85600954232805°E
- Ambassador: Achmad Rizal Purnama
- Website: kemlu.go.id/ankara/en/

The Embassy of the Republic of Indonesia in Ankara (Indonesian: Kedutaan Besar Republik Indonesia di Ankara; Turkish: Endonezya Cumhuriyeti Ankara Büyükelçiliği) is the diplomatic mission of the Republic of Indonesia to the Republic of Turkey. The embassy is currently located at Hilal Mahallesi, Sukarno Caddesi. No:24 D:1. (formerly named Hollanda Street) 06550, Cankaya, Ankara. Recently, the consular services move to 10 Prof. Dr. Aziz Sancar Street (formerly named Abdullah Cevdet Street) in Çankaya, Ankara. Indonesia also has a consulate general in Istanbul.

The first Indonesian ambassador to Turkey was Subiyakto (1959–1964). The embassy opened a year earlier in 1958 with Baharsjah as Chargés d'affaires. The current ambassador, Achmad Rizal Purnama, was appointed by President Joko Widodo on 26 June 2023.

== See also ==
- Indonesia–Turkey relations
- List of diplomatic missions of Indonesia
- List of diplomatic missions in Turkey
