= Yvonne Mewengkang =

Indonesian diplomat (born 1982)

- Mewengkang in 2026

Chief of Staff to the Foreign Minister
- Incumbent
- Assumed office 9 September 2025
- Preceded by: Roy Soemirat

Personal details
- Born: 22 June 1982 (age 44) Palu, Central Sulawesi, Indonesia
- Children: 2
- Parents: Christofel Mewengkang (father); Femmy Semen (mother)
- Education: Sam Ratulangi University; American University Diplomatic education Junior (2007) • Mid-level (2016) • Senior (2024)

Yvonne Elizabeth Mewengkang (born 22 June 1982) is an Indonesian diplomat who is currently the deputy permanent representative of Indonesia to the United Nations, serving since 2026. She previously held positions in diplomatic missions and in the foreign ministry, including most recently as chief of staff to foreign minister Sugiono.

== Early life and education ==
Mewengkang was born in Palu on 22 June 1982 as the daughter of Christofel Mewengkang and Femmy Semen. Her father was a retired army colonel who was the chief of the socio-political office in Bali and the East Nusa Tenggara between 1996 and 2002. Her father's career necessitated her to move frequently during her childhood, living in different cities such as Makassar and Bandung for elementary school, and later in Denpasar for both middle and high school. After completing high school, she returned to her hometown to study communication sciences at the Sam Ratulangi University in Manado. Her studies sparked her interest in diplomacy. During her foreign service, she received a Edward E. Masters fellowship from the United States–Indonesia Society to study at the American University School of International Studies. She graduated with a master's degree in international politics in the summer of 2012.

== Career ==
Mewengkang witnessing the establishment of diplomatic relations between Barbados and Indonesia in 2019.

Mewengkang began her foreign service career when she was awarded the prestigious Lambertus Palar Award, a scholarship specifically for Sam Ratulangi University students provided by the foreign ministry. In 2006, she passed the foreign civil service selection as a representative for North Sulawesi and starting her career in Jakarta. After completing her basic diplomatic training, she was assigned to the directorate of public diplomacy. Upon receiving her master's degree, she received her first assignment as a junior diplomat at the permanent mission to the United Nations in New York, where she was involved in various important missions from 2013 to 2016.

Yvonne returned to Jakarta in 2016 and completed mid-level diplomatic course, during which she visited Bengkulu to discuss efforts to promote the province's tourism and resource potentials. She was then assigned to handle peacekeeping issues at the Directorate of International Security and Disarmament before being named as deputy director (chief of subdirectorate) for Asia-Pacific and African intra and inter-regional cooperation.

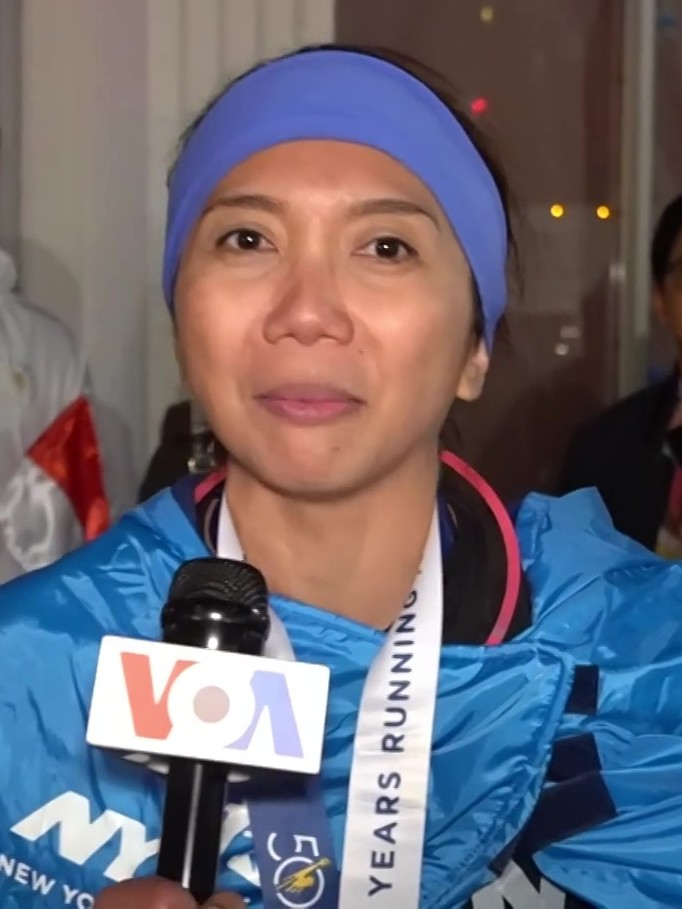
Yvonne Mewengkang taking part in the 2021 New York City Marathon.

She returned to New York from 2018 to 2022 as part of the Indonesian UN Security Council Task Force. During Indonesia's chairmanship of the United Nations Security Council in May 2019, Yvonne was involved in organizing meetings to handle international security matters. Yvonne stated that her workload would intensify dramatically during the prelude to the Syrian civil war which saw the escalation of violence in the country.

Upon serving in the permanent mission, she was recalled to Jakarta to serve as the personal secretary to foreign minister Retno Marsudi, equivalent to her deputy chief of staff. She completed her senior diplomatic education in 2024, with a final paper on Indonesia's non-permanent membership in the UN Security Council. Under foreign minister Sugiono, on 9 September 2025 Mewengkang became the chief of strategic support bureau, a position equivalent to the foreign minister's chief of staff. Shortly upon her appointment, she was designated as the foreign ministry's first spokesperson, alongside second spokesperson Vahd Mulachela. The two were introduced to the media as spokesperson on 17 September.

In a press briefing held on 17 September 2026, Yvonne claimed to have received a personal message to her WhatsApp account from an Indonesian citizen who was recruited by the Russian Army to fight in the Russo-Ukrainian war. The message was directed to foreign minister Sugiono.

On 1 October 2026, Yvonne was installed as the second deputy permanent representative of Indonesia to the United Nations with the diplomatic rank of ambassador. She remained serving as the foreign minister's chief of staff until a replacement is appointed.

== Personal life ==
Yvonne is married and has two children.
