= Achmad Rizal Purnama =

Indonesian diplomat (born 1976)

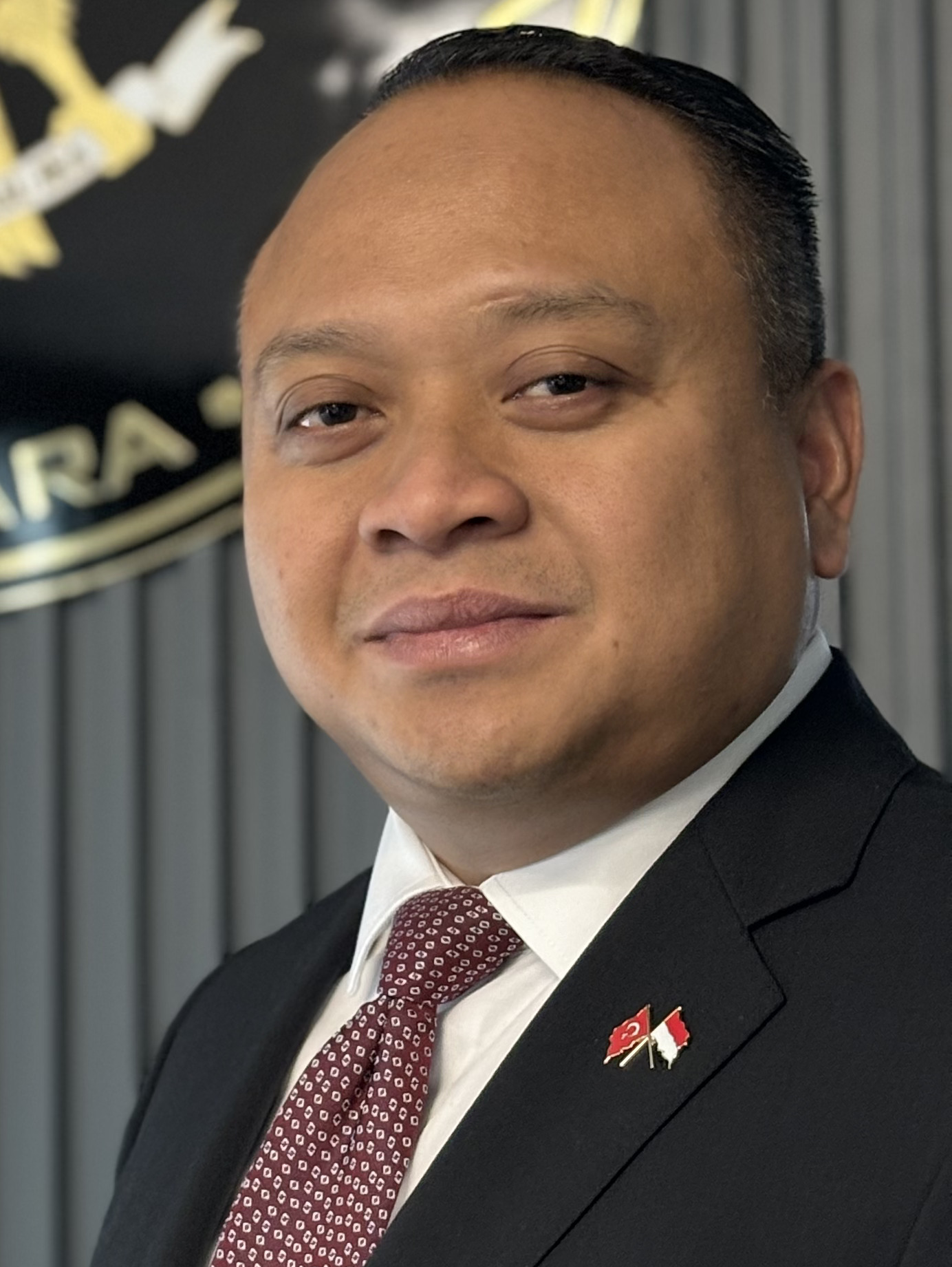

18th Ambassador of Indonesia to Turkey
- Incumbent
- Assumed office 26 June 2023
- President: Joko Widodo; Prabowo Subianto
- Preceded by: Lalu Muhamad Iqbal

Chief of Staff to the Foreign Minister
- In office 2019–2023
- Preceded by: Arrmanatha Nasir
- Succeeded by: Roy Soemirat

Personal details
- Born: 19 February 1976 (age 50) Jakarta, Indonesia
- Spouse: Elin Jumaeliah
- Children: 3
- Education: Al-Azhar University; Cairo University of Indonesia

Achmad Rizal Purnama (born 19 February 1976) is an Indonesian diplomat currently serving as the Ambassador of Indonesia to Turkey. Prior to his ambassadorship, he served as the director for Middle East and chief of staff to the foreign minister.

== Early life and education ==
Achmad was born on 19 February 1976 in Jakarta. He holds a degree in international law, which he earned in 1999 from Al-Azhar University in Cairo, Egypt. He furthered his education by obtaining a Master's degree in middle eastern studies from the University of Indonesia.

== Diplomatic career ==
Achmad began his career at the foreign ministry in 2002. His first assignment after completing his diplomatic course was at the directorate of public diplomacy, where he served from 2004 to 2006. From January 2007 to January 2010, he was posted to the economic section of the permanent mission to the United Nations in New York, where he was responsible for matters relating to economic development and environment with the rank of third secretary. During this time, he proposed the Troika+1 leadership model (Indonesia; Poland, Denmark, and the UN Secretary-General) to maintain Indonesia's leadership on climate change issues following the adoption of the 2007 Bali Roadmap. He also served as the G77+China coordinator in 2009, advocating for the interests of developing countries in agricultural matters. In response to the 2009 food crisis, Achmad guided Indonesia in proposing a high-level event at the UN General Assembly and a new agenda item on food security and sustainable development, facilitating a resolution on the matter that remains in effect today. He also facilitated the resolution mandating the UN Conference on Sustainable Development.

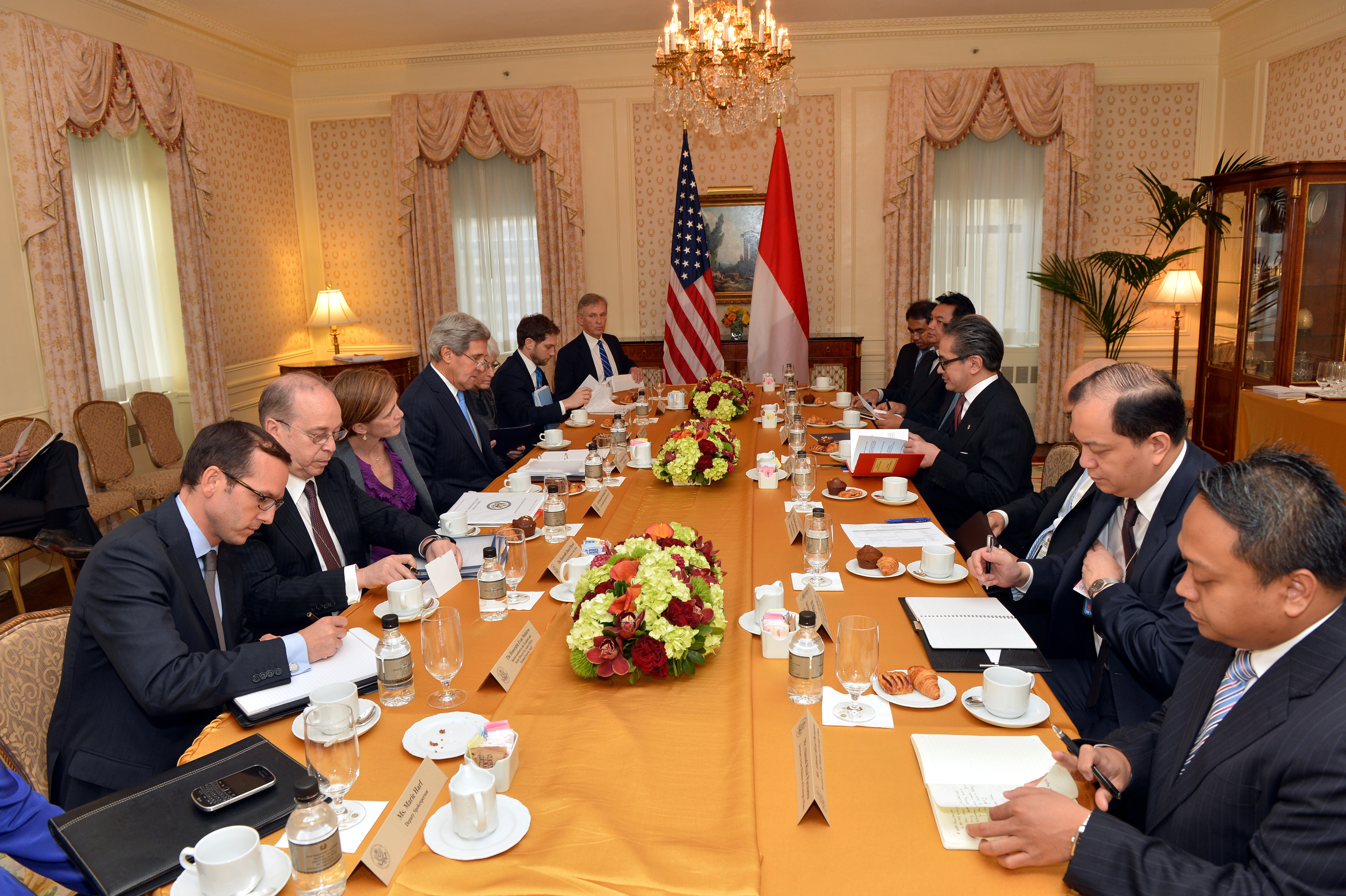
Achmad (far right) accompanying foreign minister Marty Natalegawa in a visit to the U.S., 2013.

From February 2010 to December 2013, Achmad served as the personal assistant to foreign minister Marty Natalegawa, personally accompanying the minister on all official visits. He was instrumental in facilitating the work of the foreign minister during Indonesia's Chairmanship of ASEAN in 2011 and APEC in 2013. He also played a key role in the shuttle diplomacy to ASEAN member states to solidify unity by adopting the ASEAN Six-point Principles on the South China Sea and was involved in Indonesia's efforts to address the sensitive border situation between Cambodia and Thailand.

He was posted at the embassy in Washington D.C., where he was posted to the political section of the embassy in January 2014 with the rank of first secretary. He was later promoted to counsellor in October 2015, serving until July 2017. During his posting in Washington, he played a vital role in lifting the US military embargo on the Kopassus, which was announced by US Secretary of State John F. Kerry in October 2014. He was also involved in President Joko Widodo's official visit to the US in October 2015, which resulted in the upgrade of the US-Indonesia partnership to a strategic partnership and the signing of strategic documents on defense and maritime cooperation, along with a business deal worth $21 billion.

Returning to Indonesia, Achmad was installed as the director for Middle East affairs on 22 April 2019, where he oversaw Indonesia's bilateral relations with the entire Middle East and North Africa region. Following reorganizations within the foreign ministry, Achmad took on additional role as the acting chief of staff to foreign minister Retno Marsudi, known officially as the chief of strategic support bureau. He was permanently appointed to the post in July 2020, where he provided strategic policy recommendations and was involved in policymaking. In this position, he was involved in handling Indonesia’s G20 Presidency in 2022 and its ASEAN Chairmanship in 2023, where he led the drafting of statements for the president and the foreign minister.

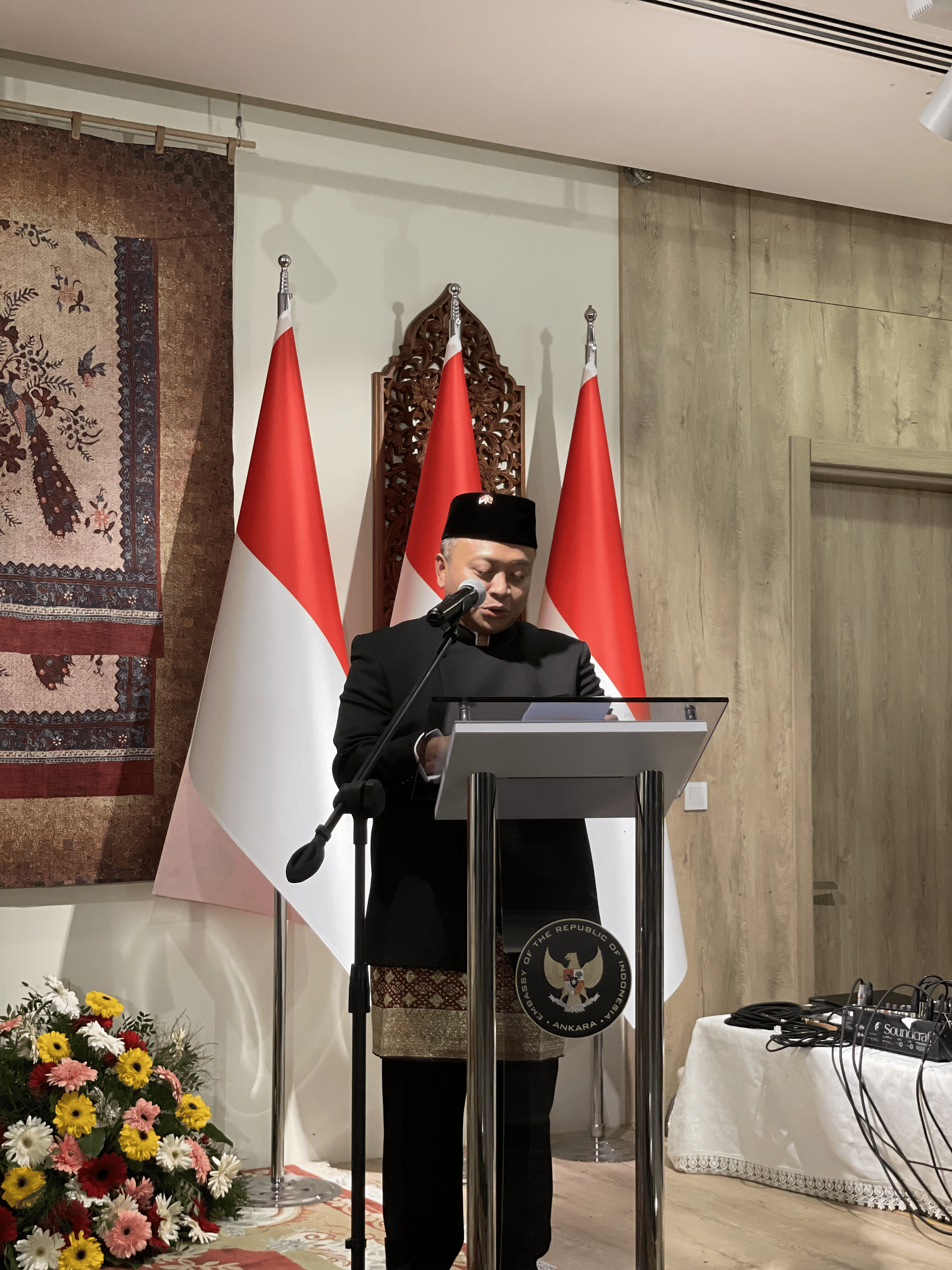
Achmad speaking as ambassador at an event.

In December 2022, Achmad was nominated as ambassador to Turkey by President Joko Widodo. After passing an assessment by the house of representative's first commission the next month, he officially assumed office on 26 June 2023. He presented his credentials to the President of Turkey Recep Tayyip Erdoğan on 17 January 2024.

== Personal life ==
Achmad Rizal Purnama is married to Elin Jumaeliah and has one daughter and two sons.
