= Ambalat =

Sea block in the Celebes Sea

- Location within Borneo
- Coordinates: 3°47′50″N 118°51′15″E

Ambalat is a sea block in the Celebes Sea located off the east coast of Borneo. It lies to the south-east of the Malaysian state of Sabah and to the east of the Indonesian province of North Kalimantan, and it is the subject of a territorial dispute between the two nations. Malaysia refers to part of the Ambalat block as Block ND6 (formerly Block Y) and part of East Ambalat Block as Block ND7 (formerly Block Z). The deep sea blocks contain an estimated 62,000,000 barrels (9,900,000 m^{3}) of oil and 348 million cubic meters of natural gas. Other estimates place it substantially higher: 764,000,000 barrels (121,500,000 m^{3}) of oil and 3.96 × 10^{10} cubic meters (1.4 trillion cubic feet) of gas, in only one of nine points in Ambalat.

== Sovereignty dispute ==
=== Territorial claims ===
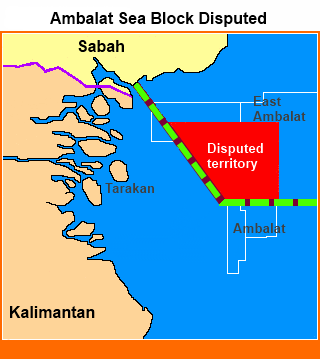
The disputed location on Ambalat sea block.

==== Malaysia ====
The dispute over the Ambalat stretch of the Celebes Sea began with the publication of a map produced by Malaysia in 1979 showing its territorial waters and continental shelf. The map drew Malaysia's maritime boundary running in a southeast direction in the Celebes Sea from the eastmost point of the Indonesia-Malaysia land border on the eastern shore of Sebatik island, thus including the Ambalat blocks, or at least a large portion of it, within Malaysian territorial waters. Indonesia has objected the map.

==== Indonesia ====
Indonesia had since 1959 claimed the islands of Sipadan and Ligitan, which in 1979 Malaysia included to be its archipelagic basepoints and again in June 2002. This effectively put the entire Ambalat area within its internal waters. During the International Court of Justice (ICJ) case over the sovereignty of Sipadan and Ligitan islands, Indonesia argued from the perspective of historic bilateral Agreements between Britain and the Netherlands over the issue of possessions. Indonesia quoted Convention between Great Britain and the Netherlands Defining the Boundaries in Borneo, 20 June 1891., Article IV:

"From 4° 10' North latitude on the east Coast the boundary-line shall be continued eastward along that parallel, across the Island of Sebittik (Sebatik): that portion of the island situated to the north of that parallel shall belong unreservedly to the British North Borneo Company, and the portion south of that parallel to the Netherlands."

and the Agreement between the United Kingdom and the Netherlands relating to the Boundary between the State of North Borneo and the Netherland Possessions in Borneo, 28 September 1915: Article 2:

"Starting from the boundary pillar on the West coast of the island of Sibetik, the boundary follows the parallel of 4° 10' North latitude westward until it reaches the middle of the channel, thence keeping a mid-channel course until it reaches the middle of the mouth of Troesan Tamboe. (3) From the mouth of Troesan Tamboe the boundary line is continued up the middle of this Troesan until it is intersected by a similar line running through the middle of Troesan Sikapal; it then follows this line through Troesan Sikapal as far as the point where the latter meets the watershed between the Simengaris and Seroedong Rivers (Sikapal hill), and is connected finally with this watershed by a line taken perpendicular to the centre line of Troesan Sikapal."

This was duplicated in the 1928 Dutch British Borneo Convention and the Dutch-British Agreement of 1930.

Indonesia maintains the argument of these historical established agreements, namely: the Indonesia-Malaysia maritime boundary continued as a straight line along the 4° 10' North after it left the eastern land boundary terminus on the eastern shore of Sebatik Island. The Dutch-British agreements effectively placed the entire Ambalat Block as within Indonesian territorial waters.
Indonesia lost the ICJ case on the issue of "effective occupancy", which was considered to over-rule the established agreements and the two islands were awarded to Malaysia. Indonesia argues Malaysian oceanic territory extends only 10 nautical miles (19 km) from Ligitan and Sipadan in accordance with UNCLOS, and that not only the 1979 Malaysian map is not only outdated and self-published, ASEAN rejects it and it severely impinges the oceanic rights of Thailand, Vietnam, China and the Philippines. Indonesia claims the Ambalat region pursuant to the 1982 UN Common Law of the Sea, under Articles 76 and 77.

Takat Unarang ("Unarang End Point/Outcrop") is the nearest to land territory at stake in the dispute, but at best, at low-tide elevation is more a rocky outcrop than a large island, but still meets the meaning of Article 121 of the Law of the Sea Convention (LOSC). Takat Unarang is 10 nautical miles (19 km) from Indonesia's low-water line or 'normal' baselines, and thus in line with Article 13 of the LOSC dealing with low-tide elevations. Takat Unarang is 12 nautical miles (22 km) from the nearest point on Malaysia's loq-water line. However, Malaysia contends on occasion Takat Unarang is no more than a submerged rock and therefore not a valid basepoint for generating maritime claims to jurisdiction.

=== Effect of ICJ ruling on Sipadan and Ligitan Islands ===
In late 2002, the ICJ awarded the two islands to Malaysia based on "effective occupation" (effectivités) rather than de jure ruling. The ICJ decision had no bearing on the issue of the Indonesia-Malaysia maritime boundary in the disputed area of the Sulawesi (Celebes) Sea.

Following the ICJ loss, Indonesia amended its baselines, removing Sipadan and Ligatan islands as basepoints. In 2008, Indonesia redrew baselines from the eastern shore of Sebatik Island to Karang Unarang and three other points to the south-east. This results in the Ambalat Block no longer being entirely inside Indonesian internal waters.

However, any determination of the ownership of Ambalat would require the maritime territorial limits of two countries to be determined via bilateral negotiation.

Furthermore, On 16 June 2008, Indonesia made a submission to the UN Commission on the Limits of the Continental Shelf (UNCLCS) regarding its claim to continental shelf rights beyond 200 nautical miles (370 km) of its coast, whereby, in accordance with Article 76 of the UN Conventions on the Law of the Sea (UNCLOS) a coastal state has the right to delineate the outer limits of its continental shelf. UNCLOS, Article 77 ensures confirming maritime territory of a coastal state secures sovereign rights for exploration and exploitation, which "do not depend on occupation, effective or notional, or on any express proclamation". Indonesia is the 12th state to submit its Extended Continental Shelf (ECS) claim, the first being the Russian Federation, which submitted one in 2001. Malaysia submitted its claims jointly with Vietnam in May 2009.

=== Petroleum concessions ===
==== Malaysia ====
On 15 February 2005, Petronas awarded two Production Sharing Contracts (PCS) to Shell and PETRONAS Carigali Sdn Bhd for the ultra-deepwater Blocks ND6 (formerly Block Y) and ND7 (formerly Block Z) off the east coast of Sabah, encroaching into Indonesian-claimed Ambalat.

The two blocks which are the main cause of the conflict are ND6 Block covers an area of about 8,700 square km, where partners will acquire and process 1,700 square km of new 3D seismic data and drill three wildcat wells with minimum financial commitment for the block at US$37 million. ND7 Block has an area of about 17,000 square km. Partners will acquire and process 800 square km of new 3D seismic data and drill one wildcat with minimum financial commitment for the block at US$13 million.

Shell and PETRONAS Carigali were to jointly operate both blocks. Shell has 50 per cent working interests; split between Sabah Shell Petroleum Co Ltd (40 per cent) and Shell Sabah Selatan Sdn Bhd (10 per cent). PETRONAS Carigali: was to own the remaining 50 per cent.

==== Indonesia ====
Indonesian awards predate the Malaysian PCS awards by at least one year. Royal Dutch Shell was awarded Ambalat Block (overlaps Malaysian ND6) in September 1999 and in October 2001 the operatorship of the block was taken over by ENI of Italy. US company Unocal was awarded the East Ambalat Block (overlaps Malaysian ND7) in 2004.

=== Incidents ===
One response prompted by the Sipadan and Ligitan case has been a lighthouse-building campaign. Indonesia has announced its intent to construct 20 lighthouses in the Ambalat area alone. Construction of a light beacon on Takat [Rock] Unarang on the fringes of the disputed zone was interrupted by Malaysian forces at the outset of the dispute on 20 February 2005, when Indonesian construction workers were arrested and later released.

The dispute between the two Southeast Asian nations amounted to a minor skirmish between the two navies several times. In March 2005, Indonesia accused the Malaysian navy vessel, KD Rencong (38), of ramming its military ship, KRI Tedong Naga (819). The incident caused minor damage to both vessels. A few days after the incident, Indonesian Defense Minister Juwono Sudarsono alleged that the Malaysian government had sent an apology regarding the incident. The Deputy Prime Minister and Defence Minister of Malaysia, Najib Razak however denied making any apology. Subsequently, Kompas agreed that their report is inaccurate and retract the story and Malaysia agreed not to take action on their misreporting.

Indonesia has submitted 36 diplomatic notes of protest to Malaysia over violations of disputed territory since 1980.

In June 2009, the dispute was reignited when Indonesian lawmakers met the Malaysian Defense Minister and accused Malaysia of violating Indonesia's maritime boundary by entering the disputed waters 19 times since the month of May 2009. On 25 May 2009, Malaysian Navy and coastguards at the Ambalat were ordered to leave Ambalat waters by the Indonesian corvette KRI Untung Surapati. Malaysian fast-attack vessel KD Yu-3508 (Malaysian navy boat) on 04.03.00 LU/118.01.70 East Longitude position, and entered Indonesia territory at 12 nautical miles (22 km), clearly violating the UNCLOS on sea border territory. Lt. Col. Toni Syaiful, commander of the Indonesian Navy Eastern Fleet stated, "[Despite] being warned twice, they just moved away several meters. Eventually, the commander of KRI Untung Surapati, Capt. Salim, made the decision to assume combat readiness. Only then did the Malaysians decide to flee." Later on the Chief of Malaysian Navy apologised for the provocation by his forces, and denied the claim that a Scorpène-class submarine of Malaysian Navy operate in the disputed territory or near the Indonesian Island of Sulawesi.

As of June 2009, Indonesia had stationed 7 of 30 warships of the Eastern Fleet Command on active notice in the area, according to Indonesian Navy Chief Adm. Tedjo Edhy Purdijatno.

== See also ==
- Indonesia-Malaysia border
- List of territorial disputes
- Ligitan
- Sipadan
