= Indonesia–Malaysia border =

International border

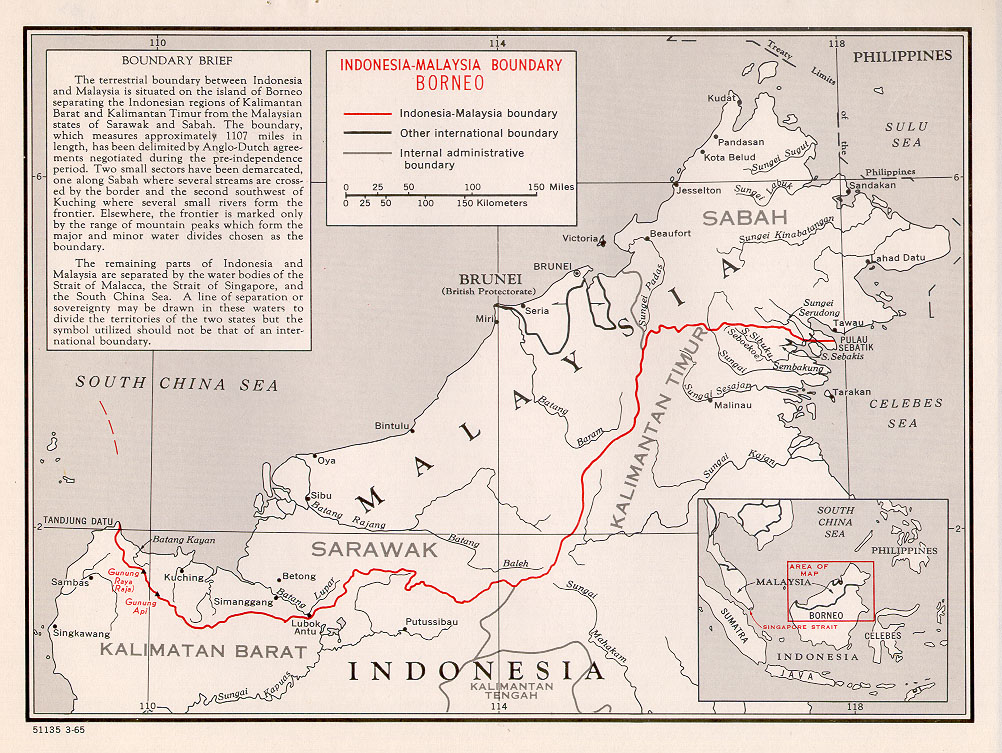
- Map of the Indonesia–Malaysia border

Characteristics
- Entities: Indonesia; Malaysia
- Length: 1,881 km (1,169 mi)

History
- Established: 1824; Treaty of London
- Current shape: 2002; Ligitan and Sipadan dispute
- Treaties: Boundary Agreement (1891; 1915; 1928)

The Indonesia–Malaysia border consists of a 1,881 km (1,169 mi) land border that divides the territory of Indonesia and Malaysia on the island of Borneo. It also includes maritime boundaries along the length of the Straits of Malacca, in the South China Sea and in the Celebes Sea.

The land boundary stretches from Tanjung Datu at the northwestern corner of Borneo through the highlands of the Borneo hinterland to the Gulf of Sebatik and the Celebes Sea in the eastern side of the island. The boundary separates the Indonesian provinces of North Kalimantan, East Kalimantan and West Kalimantan from the Malaysian states of Sabah and Sarawak.

The maritime boundary in the Straits of Malacca generally follows the median line between the baselines of Indonesia and Malaysia, running south from the tripoint with Thailand to the start of the maritime border with Singapore. Only part of this boundary has been delimited through a continental shelf boundary treaty in 1969 and a territorial sea boundary treaty in 1970. The continental shelf boundary between Indonesia and Malaysia in the South China Sea is also drawn along the equidistant line between the baselines of the two countries under the 1969 continental shelf boundary.

The border in the Celebes Sea is disputed between the two countries. Part of the dispute was settled by the judgement of the International Court of Justice in the Ligitan and Sipadan Case in 2002 and is now awaiting delimitation between the two countries. However, the two countries still have overlapping claims over the continental shelf, which Indonesia refers to as Ambalat.

There are numerous sea transport crossings between Indonesia and Malaysia, mostly between Indonesia's Sumatra island and Peninsular Malaysia but also between the Indonesian province of North Kalimantan and Malaysia's Sabah state. There are only three official land transport crossing points, all between West Kalimantan and Sarawak. Both the land and maritime borders are relatively porous; many undocumented workers have crossed from Indonesia to Malaysia.

== Land border ==
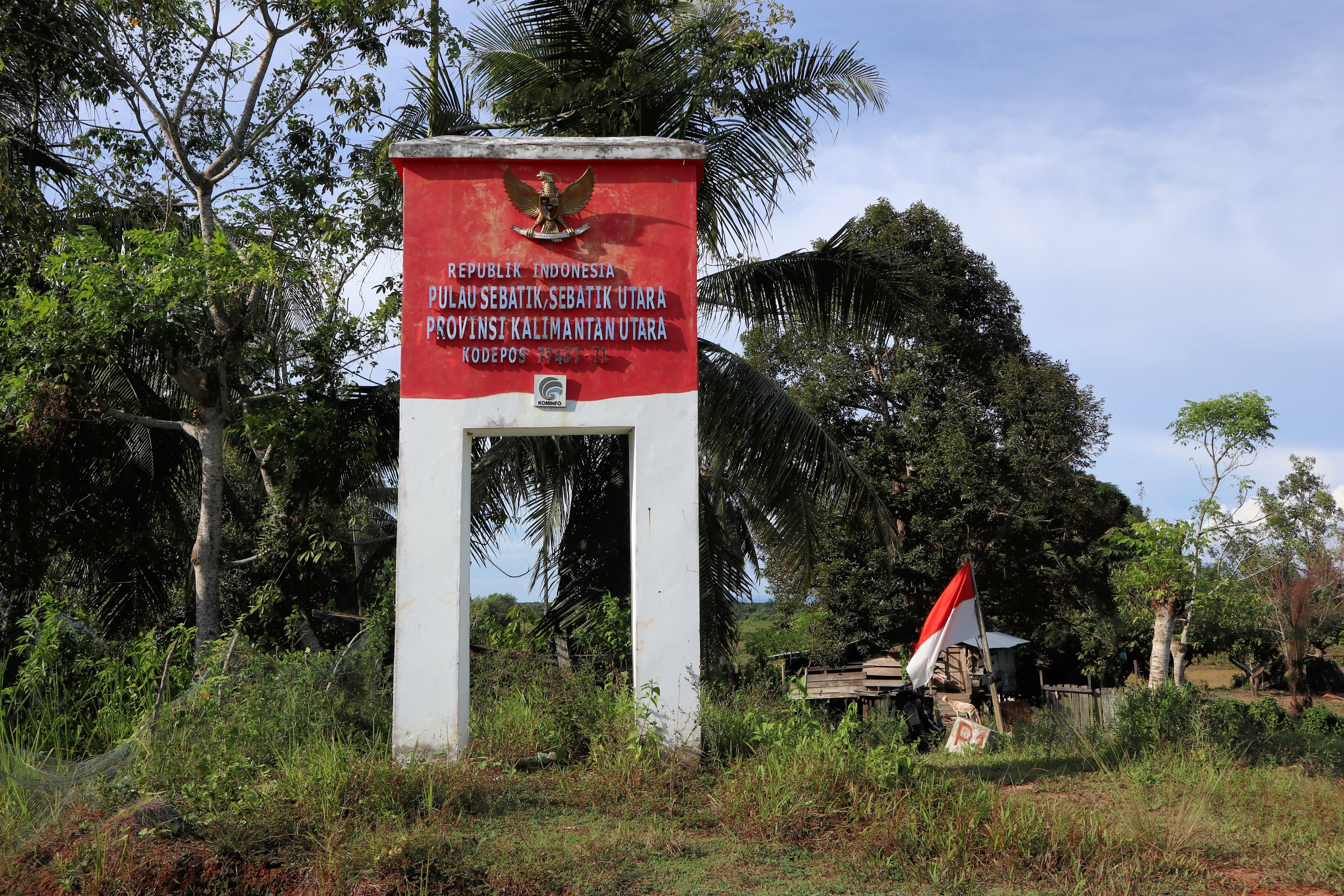
Easternmost boundary marker on the Indonesian-Malaysia border on Sebatik Island

The territorial division of Borneo gained scant Dutch attention until the arrival of British soldier James Brooke in Sarawak in 1841, which the Dutch East Indies Government in Batavia (Jakarta) sensed as a threat to their hegemonic position over Bornean coastal trade. This drove the Dutch Governor General, J.J. Rochussen, to issue a decree in February 1846 outlining Dutch terrestrial interests (as opposed to mere coastal control) over Borneo. This document provided a fait-accompli division of Borneo based on the flow of watersheds. This decree was essentially the blueprint that the Dutch subsequently negotiated with the British that resulted in the Anglo-Dutch Treaty of 1891.

The principal document determining the land border between Indonesia and Malaysia on the island of Borneo is the Border Convention or London Convention of 1891 which was signed in London between the United Kingdom and the Netherlands, the two relevant colonial powers of that time, on 20 June 1891. Subsequent agreements between the colonial powers in 1915 and 1928 fine-tuned the border further. Much of the fine-tuning of the border concerned the Jagoi - Stass region in western Borneo, which, after negotiations stalled in 1930, was not yet considered definitive. The treaty and various agreements were subsequently adopted by Indonesia and Malaysia as successor states. The unresolved status of the maritime boundary in the Celebes Sea, which has been the source of recent Malaysia-Indonesia boundary disputes over Ligitan, Sipadan and Ambalat, is partly due to the fact that most maritime boundaries were never demarcated by the colonial powers, which focused primarily on land borders.

The convention states that the eastern end of the border would start at the 4° 10' North latitude, proceeding westward across the island of Sebatik off the coast of Sabah near Tawau town, bisecting it. The border then crosses the water channel between Sebatik and the mainland and travels up along the median line of the Tambu and Sikapal channels until the hills which form the watershed between the Simengaris (in Indonesia) and Serudung (in Malaysia) rivers. The border travels generally northwestward towards the 4° 20'N, and then generally westwards but accommodating the watershed, although the Pensiangan, Agisan and Sibuda rivers are allowed to intersect the border. The border then follows the line of ridges along the watershed between major rivers following northwards into the South China Sea, and those flowing eastwards, southwards and westwards into the Celebes Sea, Java Sea and Karimata Straits until Tanjung Datu at 109° 38'.8 E 02° 05'.0 N in the western extremity of Sarawak. The watershed is however not followed in a short stretch southwest of Kuching between Gunung Api at 110° 04'E and Gunung Raja at 109° 56'E where the border follows streams, paths, crests and straight lines which are marked by boundary markers and pillars.

On 26 November 1973, a memorandum of understanding was signed between Indonesia and Malaysia for the joint survey and demarcation of their common land border. Work began on 9 September 1975 and was completed in February 2000. As of 2006, a total of 19 memoranda of understanding with 28 maps had been signed between the two countries pertaining to the survey and demarcation of the border covering a distance of 1,822.3 km of the 2,019.5 km border.

== Maritime boundaries ==
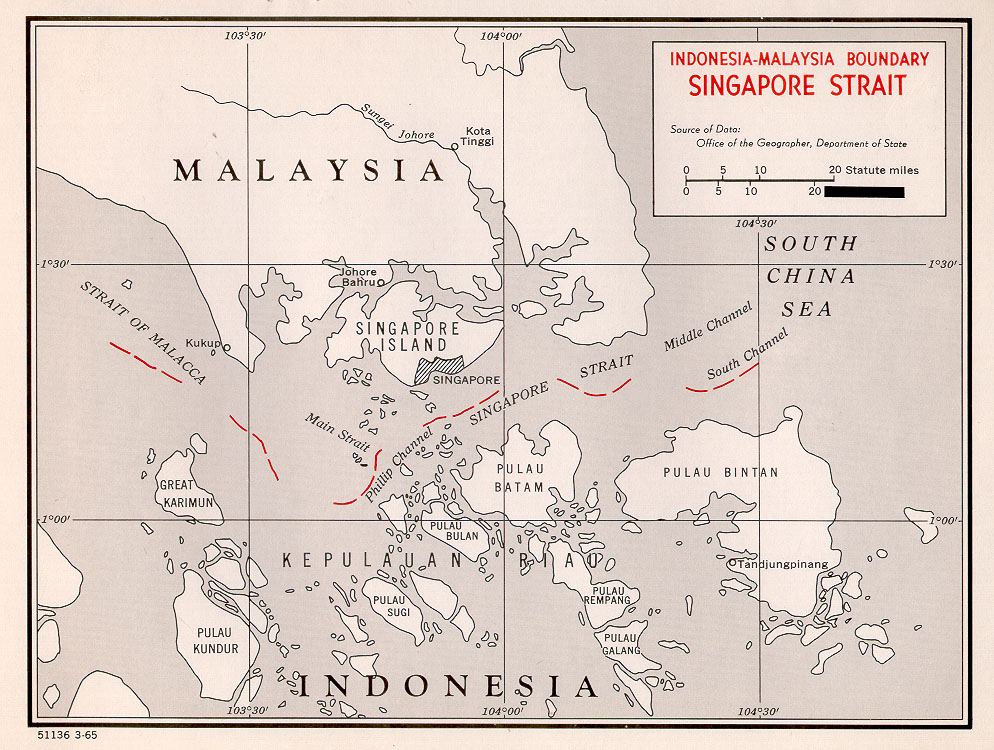
Map of the maritime border in the Singapore Strait

The maritime boundaries between Indonesia and Malaysia are located four bodies of water, namely the Strait of Malacca, Strait of Singapore, South China Sea and Celebes Sea. The territorial seas of both countries (both claim a 12-nautical-mile (22 km) territorial sea) only meet in the Straits of Malacca and Straits of Singapore. Territorial sea boundaries also exist at the continuation of both ends of the land boundary between the two countries in Borneo. Only continental shelf boundaries have been agreed to in the South China Sea while the continental shelf boundary in the Celebes Sea has not been determined at all.

=== Straits of Malacca and Straits of Singapore ===
Continental shelf and territorial sea agreements

The continental shelf and territorial sea boundaries generally runs along the median line between the baselines of the two countries. Indonesia and Malaysia both agreed to a continental shelf boundary in 1969 (signed on 27 October 1969) and a territorial sea boundary in 1970 (signed on 17 March 1970). The two countries together with Thailand entered to an agreement on 21 December 1971 established a common maritime tripoint as well as extended the continental shelf boundary between Indonesia and Malaysia from the northern terminus defined in the 1969 agreement to meet the tripoint in a straight line (see table below).

Both the continental shelf boundary and territorial sea boundary generally follow the equidistant line between the baselines of the two countries. The continental shelf and territorial sea boundaries are generally one and the same line with the same turning points except for one turning point of the territorial sea boundary known as "Turning Point 6" which does not apply to Malaysia, with the Malaysian territorial sea boundary running directly from Turning Point 5 to Turning Point 7, which coincides with the continental shelf boundary as defined by the 1969 apgreement. This phenomenon creates a small triangle of sea in the southern part of the Straits of Malacca which forms part of the Indonesian continental shelf but not part of the country's territorial sea.

Malaysia's 1979 map

The continental shelf and territorial sea boundaries beyond the southern terminus of the 1969 and 1970 agreements have not been agreed to. The 1979 territorial sea and continental shelf map published by Malaysia shows a unilaterally drawn continental shelf/territorial sea boundary connecting the southern terminus of the 1969 continental shelf and 1970 territorial sea agreement between Indonesia and Malaysia with the Malaysia-Singapore border at the western entrance of the Straits of Johor. The boundary's southernmost turning point, namely Point 17, is inside Indonesia's baseline in the Riau Islands, giving the impression that Malaysia is claiming a slice of Indonesia's internal waters as part of its territorial sea. The boundaries on the 1979 map are not recognised by Indonesia nor Singapore.

The map also does not show the western Indonesia-Malaysia-Singapore tripoint, which should be located in this area. Indonesia and Singapore signed an agreement in 2009, extending their defined common boundary to a point where the two countries claim was as far westwards as they could go bilaterally. Tri-lateral negotiations would be necessary to define the tri-point and close the undefined boundary gaps.

Point	Longitude	Latitude	Remarks
Indonesia, Malaysia and Thailand common point
CP	98° 01.5'	5° 57.0'	The 1971 agreement establishing the common point also extends the boundary from Point 1 of the continental shelf boundary to the Common Point.
Continental shelf border end and turning point coordinates
1	98° 17.5'	5° 27.0'	
2	98° 41.5'	4° 55.7'	
3	99° 43.6'	3° 59.6'	
4	99° 55.0'	3° 47.4'	
5	101° 12.1'	2° 41.5'	
6	101° 46.5'	2° 15.4'	
7	102° 13.4'	1° 55.2'	
8	102° 35.0'	1° 41.2'	
9	103° 3.9'	1° 19.5'	
10	103° 22.8'	1° 15.0'	
Territorial sea border end and turning point coordinates
1	101° 00.2'	2° 51.6'	This point is located along the continental shelf boundary between Point 4 and 5.
2	101° 12.1'	2° 41.5'	Same as Point 5 of the continental shelf boundary
3	101° 46.5	2° 15.4'	Same as Point 6 of the continental shelf boundary
4	102° 13.4'	1° 55.2'	Same as Point 7 of the continental shelf boundary
5	102° 35.0'	1° 41.2'	Same as Point 8 of the continental shelf boundary
6	103° 2.1'	1° 19.1'	This point does not apply to Malaysia
7	103° 3.9'	1° 19.5'	Same as Point 9 of the continental shelf boundary
8	103° 22.8'	1° 15.0'	Same as Point 10 of the continental shelf boundary
Turning points along the continuation of Malaysia's maritime border according to the 1979 map
15	103° 22'.8	1° 15'.0	Same as Point 10 of the continental shelf boundary and Point 8 of the territorial sea boundary
16	103° 26'.8	1° 13'.45	
17	103° 32'.5	1° 1'.45	
18	103° 34'.2	1° 11'.0	This turning point may form part of the Malaysia-Singapore border
19	103° 34'.95	1° 15'.15	This turning point may form part of the Malaysia-Singapore border
20	103° 37'.38	1° 16'.37	This turning point may form part of the Malaysia-Singapore border
21	103° 24'.1	1° 15'.85	This turning point may form part of the Malaysia-Singapore border

=== South China Sea and Straits of Singapore (Eastern portion) ===
Continental shelf agreement

Only the continental shelf boundary has been determined between the two countries for this segment of their maritime border. The border follows the equidistant line between the baselines of Indonesia and Malaysia and Point 20 is the equidistant point between Indonesia, Malaysia and Vietnam (see table below). Point 20 is the western terminus of the Indonesia-Vietnam continental shelf boundary which the two countries agreed to in 2003 and the easternmost point of the area of overlapping claims between Malaysia and Vietnam.

The southern terminus of the continental shelf boundary lies to the east of Pedra Branca which was disputed between Malaysia and Singapore and eventually awarded to Singapore by an International Court of Justice ruling.

Malaysia's 1979 map

No maritime border agreement covers the continuation of the border from the southern terminus of the continental shelf boundary to the meeting point of the territorial water of Indonesia, Malaysia and Singapore which should lie in the area. Malaysia and Singapore have also yet to determine their mutual border from the eastern terminus of the Malaysia-Singapore border which was as determined in the 1995 Malaysia-Singapore border agreement to the tripoint.

Malaysia's 1979 continental shelf and territorial sea map unilaterally connects the southern terminus of the Indonesia-Malaysia continental shelf boundary with the Malaysia-Singapore border at the eastern entrance of the Straits of Johor. The coordinates of the unilateral boundary in the chart below. The map places Pedra Branca, Middle Rocks and South Ledge inside Malaysia's territorial sea. Both Indonesia and Singapore do not recognise the borders drawn in the 1979 map.

The 2008 International Court of Justice decision on the sovereignty of Pedra Branca, Middle Rocks and South Ledge should enable the maritime borders between the three countries in this stretch of waters to be determined. Revision to the 1979 map will be needed with the awarding of Pedra Branca to Singapore and Middle Rocks to Malaysia by the ICJ. The sovereignty of South Ledge, which is submerged during high tide, will be determined later through the determination of territorial waters in which it is situated. While South Ledge lies closest to Middle Rocks and then Pedra Branca, the nearest shore to the marine feature is actually the northern shore of Indonesia's Bintan island.

Singapore has indicated that its border with Indonesia in this area will consist of two stretches - one between the main Singapore island and Indonesia's Batam island, and the other between Singapore's Pedra Branca and Indonesia's Bintan Island. A stretch of the Indonesia–Malaysia border will run in between. This will effectively establish three Indonesia-Malaysia-Singapore tripoints in the area. The determination of boundaries to fill the various gaps and defining the various tripoints would require Indonesia-Malaysia-Singapore trilateral negotiations.

Point	Longitude (E)	Latitude (N)	Remarks
Continental shelf boundary end and turning point coordinates
11	104° 29'.5	1° 23'.9	
12	104° 53'	1° 38'	
13	105° 5'.2	1° 54'.4	
14	105° 1'.2	2° 22'.5	
15	104° 51'.5	2° 55'.2	
16	104° 46'.5	3° 50'.1	
17	104° 51'.9	4° 3'	
18	105° 28'.8	5° 4'.7	
19	105° 47'.1	5° 40'.6	
20	105° 49'.2	6° 5'.8	This point is also the western terminus of the Indonesia-Vietnam continental shelf boundary; the easternmost point of the area of Malaysia-Vietnam overlapping claims.
Turning point coordinates along the continuation of Malaysia's maritime border according to the 1979 map
22	104° 7'.5	1° 17'.63	This turning point may form part of the Malaysia-Singapore border
23	104° 2'.5	1° 17'.42	This turning point may form part of the Malaysia-Singapore border
24	104° 4'.6	1° 17'.3	This turning point may form part of the Malaysia-Singapore border
25	104° 7'.1	1° 16'.2	This turning point may form part of the Malaysia-Singapore border
26	104° 7'.42	1° 15'.65	This turning point may form part of the Malaysia-Singapore border
27	104° 12'.67	1° 13'.65	This turning point may form part of the Malaysia-Singapore border
28	104° 16'.15	1° 16'.2	This turning point may form part of the Malaysia-Singapore border
29	104° 19'.8	1° 16'.5	This turning point may form part of the Malaysia-Singapore border
30	104° 29'.45	1° 15'.55	This turning point may form part of the Malaysia-Singapore border
31	104° 29'.33	1° 16'.95	This turning point may form part of the Malaysia-Singapore border
32	104° 29'.5	1° 23'.9	This point is the same as Point 11 (southern terminus) of the 1969 Indonesia-Malaysia continental shelf boundary

=== South China Sea (Off the western extremity of Sarawak) ===
Again, the only a continental shelf boundary has been agreed to in this segment of the maritime border between the two countries. The boundary begins at Point 21 with coordinates 109° 38'.8E 02° 05'.0N (109° 38' 48"E 02° 05'N) off Tanjung Datu at the western extremity of the Malaysia state of Sarawak. Incidentally, the Indonesian baseline at Tanjung Datu is located at 109° 38' 43" E 02° 05' 10" N.

From this point, the border proceeds in a general northerly direction to Point 25 at 109° 38'.6E 06° 18'.2N which is at the 100 fathom point or the edge of the continental shelf.

Point 25 is also the eastern terminus of the Indonesia-Vietnam continental shelf boundary which was agreed to by the two countries in 2003, making it the common tripoint of Indonesia, Malaysia and Vietnam. This is also the western terminus of the Malaysian continental shelf boundary in South China Sea as asserted in the country's 1979 territorial sea and continental shelf boundary map. The boundary is however not recognised by any other country.

Point	Longitude (E)	Latitude (N)	Remarks
Continental shelf boundary end and turning point coordinates
21	109° 38'.8'	2° 5'	
22	109° 54'.5	3° 0'	
23	110° 2'.0	4° 40'.0	
24	109° 59'.0	5° 31'.2	
25	109° 38'.6	6° 18'.2	This is also the eastern terminus of the Indonesia-Vietnam continental shelf boundary agreed to in 2003; western terminus of Malaysia's continental shelf boundary (South China Sea segment off the coast of Borneo) as in its 1979 map

=== Celebes Sea ===
There is no agreement over the maritime boundary in this segment. The 1979 continental shelf and territorial sea map by Malaysia depicts Malaysia's territorial sea and continental shelf border running southeast from the easternmost point of the land boundary between the two countries at 4° 10' North. Indonesia does not recognise the borders of the map and claims part of the continental shelf, calling it Ambalat (see below).

The map also puts the islands of Sipadan and Ligitan within Malaysian territorial waters. Indonesia initially rejected the assertion that the islands belonged to Malaysia and both countries brought the dispute to the International Court of Justice. In 2002, the court decided that the sovereignty of the two islands belonged to Malaysia. The court however did not determine the maritime boundary in the surrounding waters and specifically decided that the 4° 10' North parallel which marked the easternmost portion of the Indonesia-Malaysia land border in Sebatik island did not extend to sea to form either the territorial sea or continental shelf border.

Point	Longitude (E)	Latitude (N)	Remarks
Malaysia's continental shelf claim according to the 1979 map
76	120° 00'	4° 23'	This point is deemed to be the tri-point of Indonesia, Malaysia and the Philippines
77	120° 15'.75	3° 02'.75	
78	119° 53'	3° 01'.5	
79	118° 57'.5	3° 06'	
80	118° 46'.17	3° 08'.67	
81	118° 22'	3° 39'	
82	118° 01'.1	4° 03'.65	
83	117° 56'.95	4° 08'	
84	117° 53'.97	4° 10'	This point is on the eastern terminus of the land boundary

== History ==
The birth of the Indonesia–Malaysia border, or at least the portion for what is today Peninsula Malaysia, can be attributed to the 1824 treaty between Great Britain and the Netherlands which was signed in London on 17 March 1824. The treaty determined the spheres of influence in the Malay archipelago between the two colonial powers - Great Britain and the Netherlands. Great Britain was allowed to establish colonies to the north of the Straits of Malacca and Straits of Singapore while the Dutch were allowed to colonise areas to the south of the bodies of water. This line of separation between the spheres of influence became the basis of the border between British Malaya and the Dutch East Indies and ultimately, their successor states Malaysia and Indonesia.

On Borneo, the expansion of British and Dutch interests and influence over local sultanates and kingdoms occurred gradually throughout the 19th century. The northern shore of Borneo saw the British adventurer James Brooke become the Rajah of Sarawak in 1842 and gradually expanded his kingdom to its present shape and size in 1905. The Sultan of Brunei's territories in today's Sabah were initially ceded to Austrian interests, which ultimately fell into the hands of the British, which later formed the British North Borneo Company. The Sultan of Sulu also ceded its territories on the east coast of today's Sabah to the British in 1878. In the southern part of Borneo, the Dutch were negotiating treaties with various sultanates, allowing it to be the dominant colonial power in that portion of the island. In 1889, as the acquired territories of the two powers started to get closer, a commission was created to recommend a boundary. The recommendations were legalised in the Boundary Convention of 1891 which was signed in London on 20 June 1891. The boundary was updated in the Boundary Agreement of 1915 which was signed in London on 28 September 1915, and again in another Boundary Convention which was signed in The Hague, the Netherlands, on 26 March 1928.

== Disputes ==
=== Land boundary disputes ===
Despite the 1915 boundary agreement, there are at least nine areas where the two countries have outstanding disputes over the location of the land boundary. The comprise five locations along the boundary between Indonesia's North Kalimantan province and Malaysia's Sabah state, and four locations between Indonesia's West Kalimantan province and Malaysia's Sarawak state.

The locations along the Sabah-North Kalimantan boundary that are being disputed are at Sungai Sinapat, Sungai Sesai, Sungai Simantipal, B2700-B3100 (near Sungai Sinapat and Sungai Sesai) and C200-C700 on Pulau Sebatik.

On the Sarawak-West Kalimantan boundary, the four locations with outstanding boundary problems are named as Batu Aum, Sungai Buan, Gunung Raya and D400.

Certain parties regard Tanjung Datu as a fifth location of dispute. At the location, 1,400 hectare area known as Camar Bulan was recognised to be Malaysian territory after a survey done in 1976 to determine the location of the watershed, resulting in a memorandum of understanding in 1978. This decision however, had not gone down well with certain quarters in Indonesia. Nevertheless, there is a dispute of maritime territory off the coast of Tanjung Datu (see below).

=== Maritime boundary disputes ===
The main maritime disputes between Indonesia and Malaysia have occurred in the Celebes Sea. Both countries previously claimed sovereignty over the Ligitan and Sipadan islands. The dispute over the Ambalat block of the Celebes Sea seabed, believed to be rich in mineral resources, continues. There is also a section of the maritime boundary off Tanjung Datu at the western end of the land boundary which is being disputed between the two countries.

==== Ligitan and Sipadan ====
Ligitan and Sipadan are two small islands just off the east coast of Borneo which were claimed by Indonesia and Malaysia. The dispute originated in 1969 when the two countries negotiated to delimit the common border of their continental shelf. As the two countries could not agree on the sovereignty of the two islands, the continental shelf border was left off the 1969 agreement between the two countries.

Indonesia claimed that the islands were theirs by virtue of the fact that they were located south of 4° 10" North which it said formed the maritime border between it and Malaysia by virtue of a straight line extension of the land border which ended on the east coast Sebatik island. Malaysia however, claimed a stretch of territorial waters and the continental shelf south of the latitude which included the two islands. The claim was confirmed through its map which it published in 1979. Indonesia protested the delimitation on the map.

The dispute was brought before the International Court of Justice and on 17 December 2002, decided that sovereignty of Sipadan and Ligitan belonged to Malaysia on the basis of effectivités. It however did not decide on the question of territorial waters and maritime borders. This allowed the dispute over territorial waters and continental shelf to remain unresolved. The dispute over the Ambalat block (see below) can be seen to be part of this dispute over territorial waters and continental shelf.

==== Ambalat ====
Ambalat is an area of the seabed or continental shelf in the Celebes Sea off the east coast of Borneo which is claimed by Indonesia and Malaysia. The seabed is believed to be rich in crude oil. Contrary to popular belief, the International Court of Justice decision over the sovereignty of Sipadan and Ligitan did not solve the dispute over Ambalat as it did not include issues concerning the demarcation of the territorial sea and continental shelf boundaries of the two countries in the area.

The dispute started with Malaysia issuing a map in 1979 of its territorial sea and continental shelf which included the Ambalat block. The map drew Malaysia's maritime boundary in a southeast direction into the Celebes Sea after it leaves the eastmost point on land on Sebatik island. This would include the Ambalat block, or a large part of it, within the Malaysian continental shelf. Indonesia has, like the other neighbours of Malaysia, objected to the map. Indonesia has never officially announced the exact locations of its maritime boundaries but claimed during its arguments in the Sipadan Case that it continued in a straight line along the 4° 10' North latitude after it leaves Sebatik.

Both countries have also awarded exploration contracts to oil companies for the area. Indonesia has awarded concessions to ENI of Italy for what it called the Ambalat Block in 1999 and US company Unocal for East Ambalat in 2004. Petronas, the Malaysian petroleum company, meanwhile awarded a concession over what Malaysia called Block ND 6 and ND 7 in February 2005. A large part of Ambalat overlaps with Block ND 6 while a huge portion of East Ambalat overlaps with Block ND 7.

The dispute has created considerable tension between the two countries, with several facing-off incidents between the navy ships of both countries. The latest round of tension occurred at the end of May 2009 when Indonesian media reports stated that Indonesian navy ships were close to firing shots at a Malaysian navy vessel which it claimed had encroached deep into Indonesian territorial waters.

Negotiations are currently on-going to resolve the dispute, although media reports say no talks have been held since April 2008.

=== Incidents ===
==== Tanjung Berakit maritime officers arrest ====
On 13 August 2010, three Indonesian maritime officers were arrested and detained by the Malaysian Maritime Enforcement Agency in what Indonesia claimed were Indonesian territorial waters off Tanjung Berakit in the Indonesian island of Bintan while Malaysia claimed that based on GPS reading, they were waters of Kota Tinggi in Johor. The three were part of a team of five officers whose vessel (with non-functioning GPS) confronted five Malaysian fishing boats fishing in the area. The three boarded one of the Malaysian fishing boats and were then arrested by the Malaysian authorities. Their two colleagues boarded another fishing vessel and arrested seven fishermen and detained them. It was reported that the Malaysian authorities fired some warning shots during the incident. All detainees were released by 17 August 2010 but the incident unleashed a wave of anti-Malaysia sentiments in Indonesia.

Both Indonesia and Malaysia agreed that the maritime border between the two countries in the area has not been determined. Indonesia claimed that it was ready to begin negotiations to determine the border but said that the Malaysians, which relies on its 1979 territorial waters and continental shelf limit map as the basis for its claim in the area, were not ready as they wanted to settle its maritime border with Singapore adjacent to the area first following the International Court of Justice's award of the sovereignty of Pedra Branca to Singapore.

==== Indonesian authorities intrusion on Sabah ====
On 13 March 2015, around 17 Indonesians, comprising 10 policemen, four soldiers and three civilians were caught in Malaysia with 12 firearms (eight pistols and four .38 Smith & Wesson revolvers with bullets) was seized from them after they were intruding past and attacked a Malaysian police station on Sebatik Island, Sabah to get a suspected killer whom they alleged have hiding in the police station on the Malaysian side of Sebatik Island. Initial investigation found all of the Indonesians were found to be acting on their own without instructions from their authorities. The group had crossed the Malaysian border using motorcycles and speedboats. Of which seven of them arrived in a speedboat while the rest were on motorcycles. The suspect who was apparently wanted by Indonesian police was then arrested by the Malaysian police.

== Border crossings ==
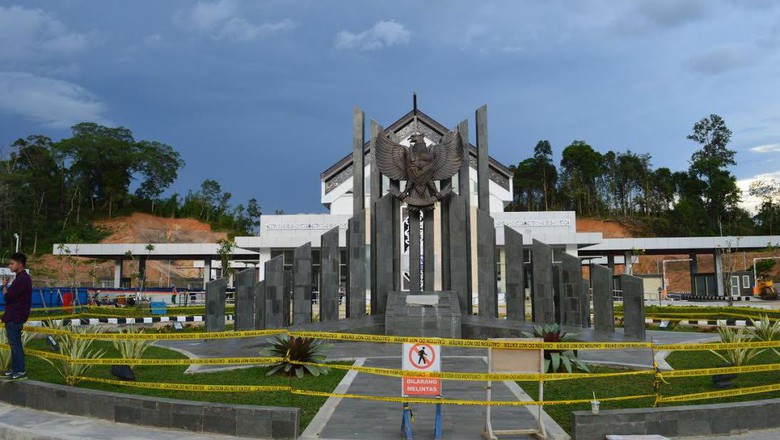
Entikong border checkpoint in Sanggau, West Kalimantan

=== Land crossings ===
There are four official land border crossings, all of them located between Sarawak and West Kalimantan:

- Between Tebedu, Sarawak and Entikong, West Kalimantan. The crossing is along the main route between Kuching, the capital of Sarawak, and Pontianak, the capital of West Kalimantan.
- Between Biawak, Sarawak and Aruk, West Kalimantan.
- Between Lubok Antu, Sarawak and Nanga Badau, West Kalimantan
- Between Serikin, Sarawak and Jagoi Babang, West Kalimantan

There are numerous other informal crossings between Indonesia and Malaysia along the length of the land border, such as:

- Between Telok Melano, Sarawak and Temajuk, West Kalimantan
- Between Bakelalan, Sarawak and Long Bawan, North Kalimantan

These crossing are mostly used by the local population and a certain amount of cross-border trading and smuggling goes on at these and other illegal crossings. Illegal immigrants are also known to use such crossings.

=== Sea crossings ===
There are numerous scheduled sea crossings between Indonesia and Malaysia, mostly between ports in the former's island of Sumatra and Peninsula Malaysia. Here is a list of ports (Indonesian port followed by the Malaysian port) where scheduled boat services operate as of April 2008:

Sumatra–Peninsula Malaysia

- Batam – Stulang
- Batam – Pasir Gudang
- Batam – Iskandar Puteri
- Aceh – Penang
- Bengkalis – Malacca
- Bengkalis – Muar
- Dumai – Malacca
- Dumai – Muar
- Dumai – Port Klang
- Dumai – Port Dickson
- Selat Panjang – Batu Pahat
- Tanjungbalai – Port Klang
- Tanjung Balai Karimun – Kukup
- Karimun – Iskandar Puteri
- Tanjung Pinang – Stulang

North Kalimantan–Sabah

- Nunukan – Tawau
- Tarakan – Tawau
- Sungai Nyamuk – Tawau

== See also ==
- Indonesia–Malaysia relations
- Konfrontasi
