= Tawau Airport =

Airport in Sabah, Malaysia

Tawau Airport Lapangan Terbang Tawau
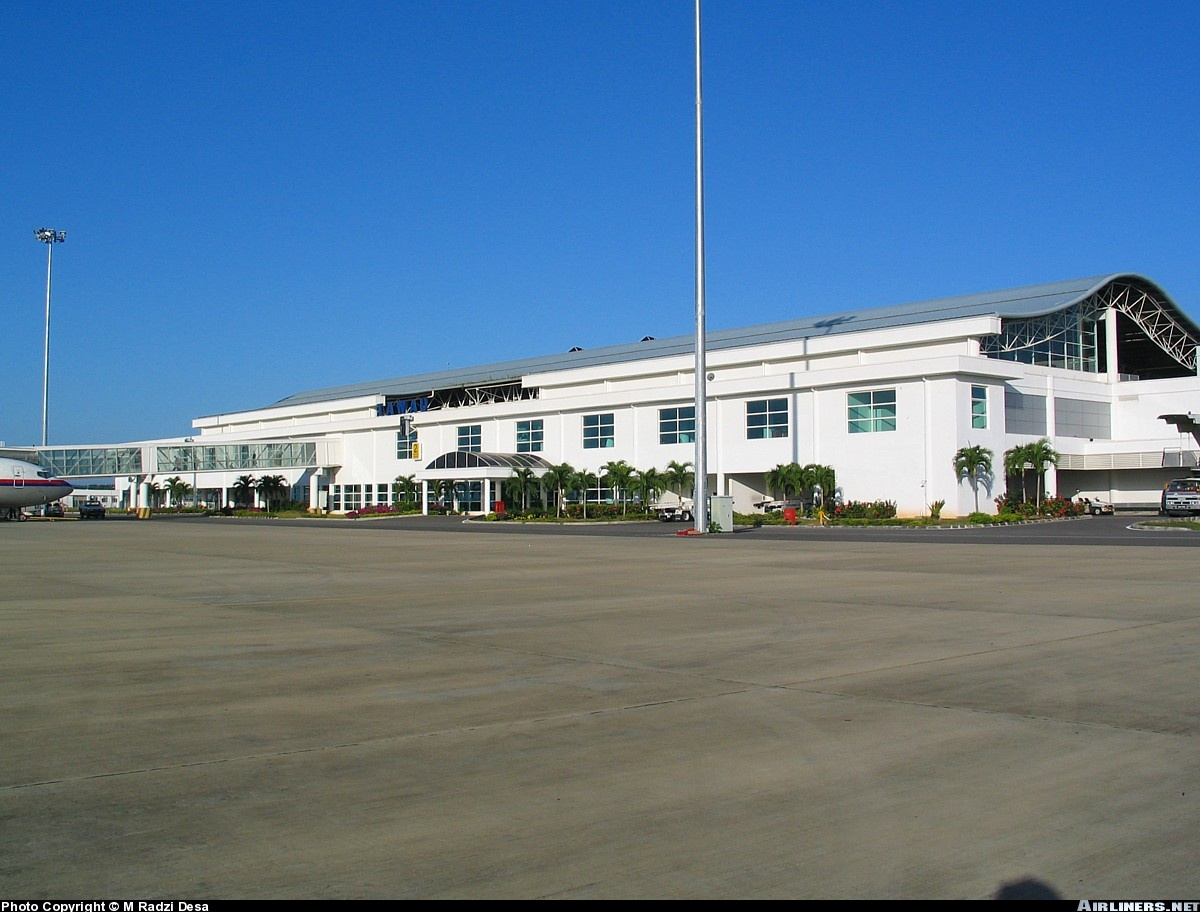
- The main terminal of Tawau Airport as seen from the tarmac
- IATA: TWU; ICAO: WBKW

Summary
- Airport type: Public
- Owner: Government of Malaysia
- Operator: Malaysia Airports Holdings Berhad
- Serves: Tawau Division
- Location: Tawau, Sabah, Malaysia
- Time zone: MST (UTC+08:00)
- Elevation AMSL: 57 ft (17 m)
- Coordinates: 04°18′48″N 118°07′19″E

Map
- Location in Sabah state Location in East Malaysia Location in Borneo Location in Malaysia Location in Southeast Asia

Runways
Direction	Length		Surface
Direction	m	ft	Surface
06/24	2,686	8,812	Asphalt

Statistics (2020)
- Passenger: 572,365 (▼68.8%)
- Airfreight (tonnes): 5,071 (▲30.3%)
- Aircraft movements: 7,022 (▼55.8%)
- Sources: official web site

Tawau Airport (Malay: Lapangan Terbang Tawau) (IATA: TWU, ICAO: WBKW) is an airport located 15 nautical miles (28 km; 17 mi) north east of Tawau, Sabah, Malaysia. With increasing international connectivity, Tawau Airport has risen as a significant international gateway for the east coast of Sabah, complementing the role of Kota Kinabalu International Airport.

Tawau Airport serves the districts of Tawau, Kunak and Semporna. Is the nearest airport to the diving islands of Sipadan, Mabul, Kapalai and Tun Sakaran Marine Park, all of which are located in Semporna. The airport also serves as a gateway to Maliau Basin and Danum Valley, both significant conservation areas in the region.

In 2023, Tawau Airport recorded 1,710,472 passenger movements, ranking as the 8th busiest airport in Malaysia.

== Old Airport (1953-2001) ==
=== Old Terminal ===
In 1951, the British North Borneo government approved plans to construct an aerodrome in Tawau. The Tawau Airstrip opened in 1953, located on Jalan Utara (Northern Road), about 3.2 km from the town center. The first flight took place on September 24, 1953, with Sabah Airways Limited operating twice-weekly flights from Sandakan using a de Havilland Dragon Rapide aircraft. By 1954, the route included an intermediate stop in Lahad Datu following the completion of the Lahad Datu airstrip.

By the end of the 1950s, Borneo Airways served the airport with a Scottish Aviation Twin Pioneer aircraft, connecting Tawau to Lahad Datu, Sandakan and Jesselton. In the early 1960s, in response to increased air travel demand, the runway was extended from 2,400 feet of coral to 4,500 feet of gravel, allowing daily scheduled flights to Jesselton with a Douglas DC-3 by August 1962.

=== New Terminal ===
A new terminal, capable of accommodating regional aircraft such as the Fokker 27, was officially opened in 1968 by Malaysia's then Transport Minister, Tan Sri Haji Sardon. During this period, the route leading to the original terminal was renamed as Jalan Airport Lama (Old Airport Road), while the road leading to the compound of new terminal was named Jalan Airport Baru (New Airport Road).

In the 1970s, the airport began offering international flights to Balikpapan and Tarakan via Bouraq Indonesian Airlines, with services operating three times a week. In October 1981, following the extension of the runway to 5,600 feet and upgrades to the parking apron and terminal, Malaysia Airlines introduced Boeing 737-200 services. Additionally, in 1995, Merpati Nusantara Airlines began direct flights from Sultan Hasanuddin International Airport in Makassar, Indonesia, highlighting the strong socio-economic ties between Tawau and Makassar.

=== Accidents and incidents ===
On September 15, 1995, Malaysia Airlines Flight 2133, operated by a Fokker 50 aircraft from Kota Kinabalu, landed approximately 500 meters (1,600 feet) short of the 1,700-meter (5,577 feet) runway at Tawau Airport. While attempting a go-around, the aircraft crashed into an informal settlement in Kampung Seri Menanti, resulting in 34 fatalities, including two crew members.

Earlier incidents at the airport included a crash on March 20, 1995, when a Cessna Caravan cargo plane crashed into residential houses due to a failed take-off. In October 2001, a Boeing 737 went off the runway, but there were no injuries reported.

=== Planning and development for a new airport ===
A survey revealed that the old Tawau Airport possessed one of the shortest runways in Malaysia. This limitation necessitated either an extension of the existing runway or the construction of a new airport to safely accommodate larger aircraft.

In response to this need, the government announced plans to develop a new airport situated near the Balung area, approximately 4 km from the current Tawau Airport terminal building. The proposed location is about 30 km (19 mi) east of downtown Tawau along the Tawau - Lahad Datu Highway.

== New Airport ==
=== Inauguration and initial progress ===
The new Tawau Airport began operations in December 2001. Direct flights to Kuala Lumpur were introduced in 2002, followed by services to Johor Bahru in 2006. The airport was officially inaugurated by Malaysia's then Transport Minister, Tun Dr. Ling Liong Sik, in 2003.

With an annual capacity exceeding 1.4 million passengers, it is the second-largest airport in Sabah, after Kota Kinabalu International Airport. In its first year of operation in 2002, the airport handled 495,462 passengers and recorded 6,928 aircraft movements.

=== Facilities ===
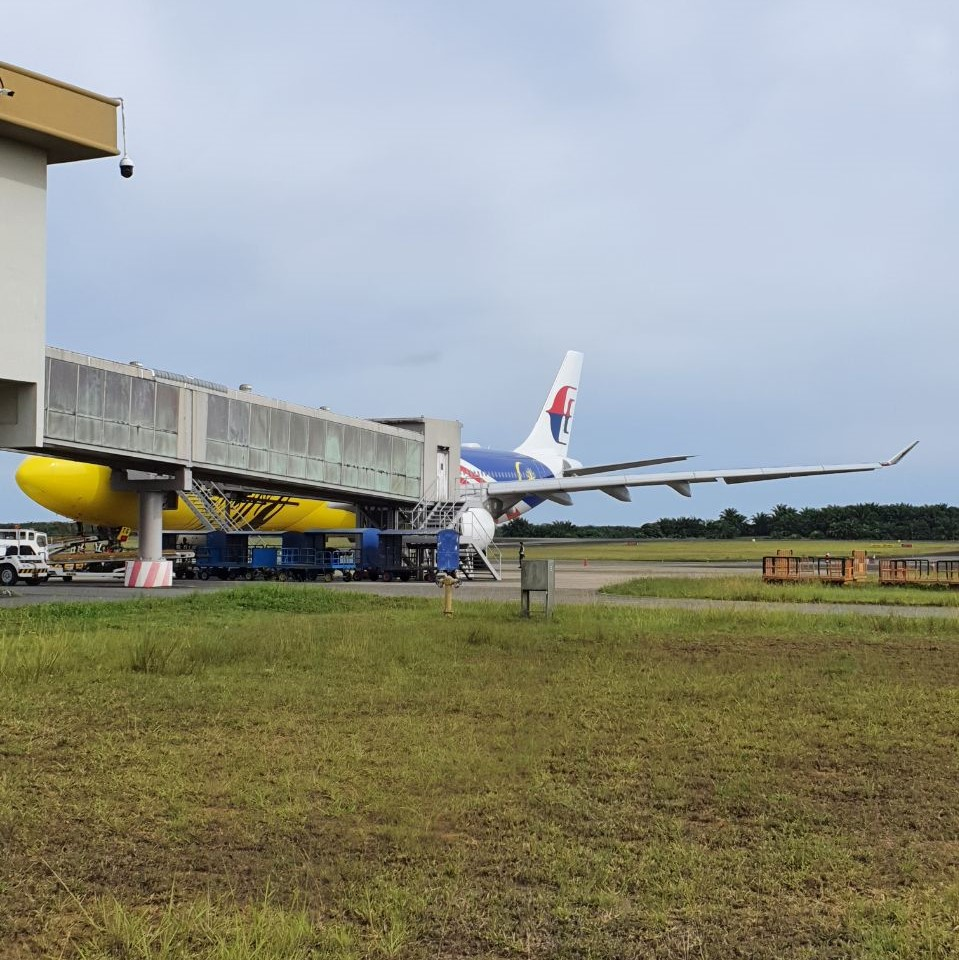
Malaysia Airlines briefly operated A330-300 for its cargo operations in Tawau utilizing the airports gate 1 Jetway.

Tawau Airport features a 2,685-meter by 47-meter (8,809-foot by 154-foot) runway, designated as Runway 06/24, with Runway 24 equipped with an Instrument Landing System (ILS). The terminal building, which has one and a half stories, includes two aerobridges and can accommodate up to eight aircraft simultaneously.

The parking lot has space for 500 vehicles. Additionally, a police station is situated across from the terminal. The upgraded facilities support night operations, a significant improvement over the limited capabilities of the previous airport.

=== Regional connectivity ===
In 2012, MASwings planned to expand its network from Tawau to two new destinations, including Makassar in Indonesia and Davao in the Philippines, with flights to Makassar and Davao routed through Tawau. These plans were part of broader efforts to enhance cross-border regional connectivity under the Brunei-Indonesia-Malaysia-Philippines East ASEAN Growth Area (BIMP-EAGA).

Before the COVID-19 pandemic, Tawau Airport provided international flights to Tarakan, Indonesia and Bandar Seri Begawan, Brunei. These routes were operated by MASWings and RB Link, facilitating travel between Tawau and these locations. Additionally, AirAsia had initiated flights to Singapore in 2010 and to Kuching in 2018, but both routes were subsequently discontinued due to insufficient passenger demand at those times.

In 2018, Wings Air's Operations Director, Captain Redi Irawan, stated that the airline was considering the introduction of a Balikpapan–Tawau route. This consideration was based on a review which identified strong demand for the service.

The following year, Tony Fernandes, CEO of AirAsia Group, announced plans for AirAsia to commence direct flights from Tawau to various cities in China, Korea, Japan and other ASEAN destinations by 2020. This expansion was motivated by Tawau's proximity to major ecotourism attractions such as Tun Sakaran Marine Park, Mabul, Sipadan Island, Maliau Basin and Danum Valley in southeast Sabah. Additionally, Assafal P. Alian, the Ministry of Tourism, Culture and Environment of Sabah, proposed reinstating flights between Tawau and Makassar due to strong demand.

Furthermore, the Deputy for Infrastructure in Nunukan, Indonesia, requested a direct air link to Tawau. He cited significant passenger and cargo traffic, with approximately 30,000 passengers traveling between the two locations each month.

In 2021, amid disruptions in supply chains caused by the pandemic, MASkargo began operating twice-weekly flights to Hong Kong. These flights utilized a converted Airbus A330-300 from Malaysia Airlines, which was specially configured for cargo operations. This service aimed to address the increased demand for air freight during this period.

=== Expansion and capacity issues ===
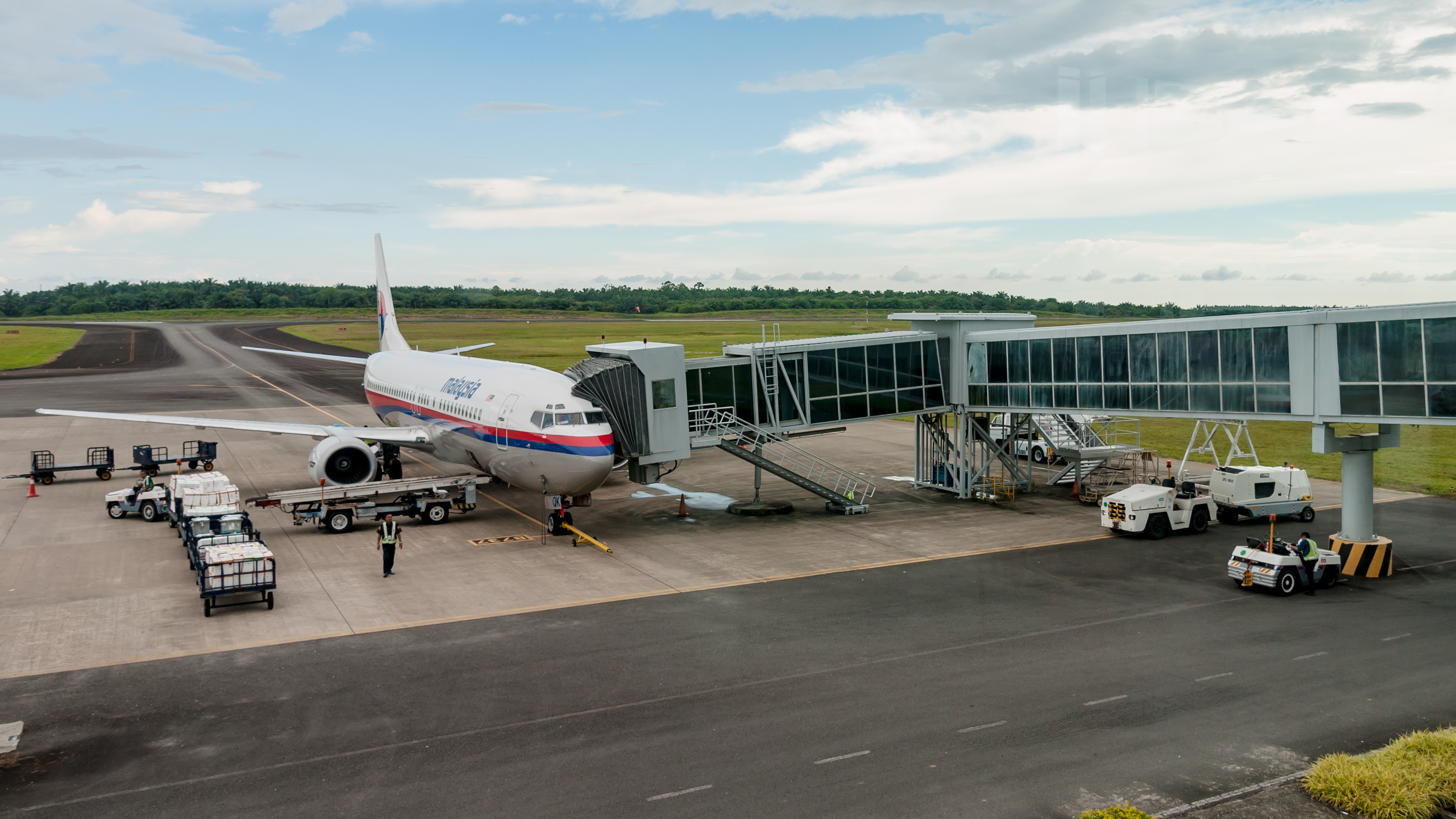
One of Tawau Airport's two aerobridges, mainly used by Malaysia Airlines and Batik Air Malaysia

The airport was slated for expansion following a record of 1.64 million passengers in 2018, exceeding its original capacity of 1.4 million. With a 19.4% increase in passenger numbers that year, it ranked fourth in the country for passenger growth, behind Kuala Lumpur, Kota Kinabalu and Penang International Airports. By 2019, the number of passengers grew further to 1,833,540, marking an additional 11.8% increase.

The expansion project, initially anticipated to commence by late 2019, was designed to address the increasing passenger traffic and enhance the overall airport experience. This included upgrading facilities and enhancing the shopping experience. The primary goal of this project was to increase the airport's capacity to accommodate up to 2.5 million passengers annually.

As of 2022, Tawau Airport continued to face capacity issues. Problems included insufficient immigration lanes, limited seating in the terminal, and inadequate aircraft bays during peak times, leading to congestion. Despite efforts by local politicians and Malaysian Airports to advocate for expansion, no plans had been approved by the Ministry of Transport. A 2019 study by the Malaysian Aviation Commission (MAVCOM) revealed that the airport was operating at 130% of its capacity, driven by a surge in domestic travel and its role as the main gateway for tourists to Semporna, without corresponding capacity adjustments to accommodate the increased demand.

In July 2023, Malaysia Airports Sdn Bhd (MASB) allocated RM11 million for a facelift improvement program. This upgrade includes additional toilets, an enhanced check-in area, an expanded departure lounge, more retail spaces and the installation of additional air-conditioning in the hall.

The Malaysian Government is also considering further expansion of Tawau Airport as part of the Twelfth Malaysia Plan, through its Rolling Plan (RP4). This proposed expansion aims to increase the terminal's passenger capacity from 1.5 million to 2.5 million annually.

=== Route proposals and new international destinations ===
In 2023, the state Minister of Tourism, YB Datuk Christina Liew said there's also proposal to have charter flights from Seoul in South Korea and Shanghai in China to Tawau. This initiative was in response to the significant demand for such connections. Previously, in June 2022, then-Sabah Tourism, Culture, and Environment Minister Datuk Jafry Ariffin suggested expanding direct flights between Changi Airport and Sabah's east coast towns, including Sandakan and Tawau, to Singapore's Senior Minister of State for National Development and Foreign Affairs, Sim Ann. This initiative aimed to enhance tourism by promoting attractions such as Pulau Sipadan and the Sepilok Orang Utan Rehabilitation Centre. Additionally, Philippines AirAsia and Shanghai Airlines are also considering launching direct flights from Manila and Shanghai to Tawau in order to meet travel demands.

On 23 January 2024, new overseas services were introduced, beginning with charter flights to Nanjing, which take approximately five hours, marking the first medium-haul flight to the east coast of Sabah. This reestablished international connections at Tawau Airport, which previously operated international flights to Tarakan, Indonesia and Bandar Seri Begawan, Brunei, both of which were discontinued during the pandemic.

In October 2024, AirAsia announced plans to establish Tawau as its newest hub in Sabah, aiming to enhance direct international connectivity to North Asia with potential routes to Shanghai, Guangzhou and Taipei. This initiative aligns with AirAsia's broader strategy to increase passenger capacity in Sabah. In the same month, Aris Heru Utomo, the Consul of the Republic of Indonesia in Tawau, proposed reinstating the Makassar-Tawau flight route, noting the significant number of people from South Sulawesi residing in Tawau.

By 2024, Tawau Airport hosted both chartered and seasonal scheduled flights to Chengdu–Tianfu, Nanjing, Guangzhou and Macau, operated by Firefly and Batik Air. In 2025, AirAsia operated seasonal flights from Singapore for Chinese New Year, catering to peak travel demands.

Late 2025 and early 2026 saw further expansion as new international carriers commenced operations at Tawau Airport. Loong Air commenced seasonal flights to Shenzhen from 6 to 18 December 2025, followed by Juneyao Air and Greater Bay Airlines, which are scheduled to launch routes to Shanghai–Pudong and Hong Kong on 15 and 20 January 2026, respectively. Meanwhile, AirAsia has introduced charter flights to Macau, as well as scheduled services to Guangzhou and, from 22 December 2025, Shanghai.

=== Future development ===
Plans for major upgrades at Tawau Airport were announced in October 2024 by Transport Minister, Anthony Loke, who revealed a RM130 million expansion project aimed at addressing overcrowding caused by rising passenger numbers. Scheduled to begin in early 2025 and finish within three years, the works will increase the terminal's floor area from 15,800 m^{2} to 23,500 m^{2}, expand check-in counters from 12 to 20 and fully equip the facility with air conditioning. Upon completion, the airport's annual passenger capacity is expected to rise from 1.5 million to 2.5 million. The project also includes improvements to interior landscaping, multilingual signage and the deployment of customer service staff fluent in multiple languages.

In August 2025, the Ministry of Transport awarded a RM120.9 million design-and-build contract to Pembinaan Azam Jaya Sdn Bhd, a wholly owned subsidiary of Azam Jaya Bhd, for upgrading works at the airport. The project is scheduled to run from 22 August 2024 to 21 August 2028, with expected completion on 17 August 2028 and aims to further enhance the airport's facilities as part of broader infrastructure development efforts in Sabah.

== Airlines and destinations ==
=== Passenger ===
Airlines	Destinations
AirAsia	Guangzhou, Johor Bahru, Kota Kinabalu, Kuala Lumpur–International; Charter: Macau, Shanghai–Pudong
AirBorneo	Sandakan
Batik Air Malaysia	Kota Kinabalu, Kuala Lumpur–International; Seasonal: Guangzhou
Firefly	Kuala Lumpur–International
Greater Bay Airlines	Charter: Hong Kong
Juneyao Air	Shanghai–Pudong
Malaysia Airlines	Kuala Lumpur–International

== Traffic and statistics ==
=== Traffic ===
Annual passenger numbers and aircraft statistics
Year	Passengers handled	Passenger % Change	Cargo (tonnes)	Cargo % Change	Aircraft Movements	Aircraft % Change
2003	551,168	Steady	2,701	Steady	8,368	Steady
2004	620,847	▲12.6	2,968	▲9.9	8,900	▼6.4
2005	680,901	▲9.7	3,885	▲30.9	9,814	▲10.3
2006	660,331	▼3.0	3,030	▼22.0	9,215	▼6.1
2007	736,646	▲11.6	2,134	▼29.6	7,992	▼13.3
2008	768,967	▲4.4	1,262	▼40.9	8,546	▲6.9
2009	866,601	▲12.7	1,951	▲54.6	9,876	▲15.6
2010	897,848	▲3.6	3,045	▲56.1	10,845	▲9.8
2011	922,452	▲2.7	3,198	▲5.0	10,186	▼6.1
2012	982,153	▲6.5	2,489	▼22.2	11,087	▲8.8
2013	1,202,344	▲22.4	2,844	▲14.3	13,896	▲26.5
2014	1,218,616	▲1.4	3,265	▲14.8	14,396	▲3.6
2015	1,203,792	▼1.2	3,910	▲19.8	14,007	▼2.7
2016	1,271,915	▲5.7	3,570	▼8.7	13,280	▼5.2
2017	1,374,893	▲8.1	3,884	▲8.8	12,949	▼2.5
2018	1,642,171	▲19.4	4,060	▲4.5	15,579	▲20.3
2019	1,833,540	▲11.7	3,893	▼4.1	15,871	▲1.9
2020	572,365	▼68.8	5,071	▲30.3	7,022	▼55.8
^{Source: Malaysia Airports Holdings Berhad}

=== Statistics ===
Busiest Flights Out of Tawau Airport by Frequency as of July 2023
Rank	Destination	Frequency (Weekly)	Airlines
1	Kota Kinabalu, Sabah	53	AK, MH, OD
2	Kuala Lumpur	52	AK, MH
3	Sandakan, Sabah	7	MH
4	Johor Bahru, Johor	4	AK

== Incidents and accidents ==
- On 18 April 2024, over 2,000 passengers were left stranded at Tawau Airport due to flight cancellations resulting from the volcanic eruption of Gunung Ruang in North Sulawesi, Indonesia.

== See also ==
- Far East Air Force (Royal Air Force)
- List of former Royal Air Force stations
