= Territorial waters of Indonesia =

Territorial waters and claimed exclusive economic zone of Indonesia

The Indonesian archipelagic baselines pursuant to article 47, paragraph 9, of the UNCLOS

The territorial waters of Indonesia are defined according to the principles set out in Article 46 of the United Nations Convention on the Law of the Sea. Their boundary consists of straight lines ("baselines") linking 195 coordinate points located at the outer edge of the archipelago ("basepoints").

== Baselines legislation ==
The current baselines were established by Government Regulation 38 of 2002 which defined by 183 coordinate points as basepoints. The baselines were modified by Government Regulation No 37 of 2008 which changed as well as added basepoints to take into account the International Court of Justice decision on the sovereignty of Sipadan and Ligitan islands and the independence of East Timor. No additional points were established for the area around Sipadan and Ligitan where the baselines was redrawn, while 10 new basepoints were added for the baseline to run around East Timor. Adjustments with two additional points were also made for the southern Java coast.

== History ==
Indonesia's first piece of legislation pertaining to baselines and territorial waters was its Act No. 4 of 1960 which was decreed on 18 February 1960. The act established the country's baselines based on the "archipelago theory" which was not recognized by international law at that time. The baselines consisted of straight lines joining 201 basepoints at the edge of the archipelago.

In 1996, Indonesia enacted Law No 6 on the Indonesian Territorial Waters using the principles embodied in the UNCLOS 1982 which Indonesia ratified in 1985. The new law revoked the baselines established by the 1960 act and enabled a new set of baselines to be drawn up through the 2002 Government Regulation.

== List of basepoints ==
=== South China Sea ===
Point	Latitude	Longitude	Remarks
South China Sea
1	1° 14' 27" N	104° 34' 32" E	Tanjung Berakit Bintan Island, Riau Islands province
2	1° 02' 52" N	104° 49' 50" E	Sentut Island, Bintan, Riau Islands
3	2° 18' 00" N	105° 35' 47" E	Tokong Malang Biru Island, Anambas, Riau Islands
4	2° 44' 29" N	105° 22' 46" E	Damar Island, Anambas, Riau Islands
5	3° 05' 32"N	105° 35' 00" E	Mangkai Island, Anambas, Riau Islands
6	3° 19' 52" N	105° 57' 04" E	Tokong Nanas Island, Anambas, Riau Islands
7	3° 27' 04" N	106° 16' 08" E	Tokong Belayar Island, Anambas, Riau Islands
8	4° 04' 01" N	107° 26' 09" E	Tokong Boro Island, Natuna, Riau Islands
9	4° 31' 09" N	107° 43' 17" E	Semiun Island, Natuna, Riau Islands
10	4° 42' 25" N	107° 54' 20" E	Sebetul Island, Natuna, Riau Islands
11	4° 47' 38" N	108° 00' 39" E	Sekatung Island, Natuna, Riau Islands
12	4° 47' 45" N	108° 01' 19" E	Sekatung Island, Natuna, Riau Islands
13	4° 00' 48" N	108° 25' 04" E	Senua Island, Natuna, Riau Islands
14	3° 01' 51" N	108° 54' 52" E	Subi Kecil Island, Natuna, Riau Islands
15	2° 38' 43" N	109° 10' 04" E	Kepala Island, Natuna, Riau Islands
16	2° 05' 10" N	109° 38' 43" E	Tanjung Datu, West Kalimantan; westernmost terminus of Indonesia-Malaysia land border

=== Celebes Sea, Philippine Sea and the Pacific Ocean ===
Point	Latitude	Longitude	Remarks
Celebes (Sulawesi) Sea
17♦	4° 10' 10" N	117° 54' 29" E	Sebatik Island, Nunukan Regency. East Kalimantan; Easternmost point of Indonesia-Malaysia land border
18♦	4° 09' 58" N	117° 55' 44" E	Sebatik Island, Nunukan, East Kalimantan
19♦	4° 09' 34" N	117° 56' 27" E	Sebatik Island, Nunukan, East Kalimantan
20♦	4° 00' 38" N	118° 04' 58" E	Karang Unarang, Nunukan, East Kalimantan
21	2° 15' 12" N	118° 38' 41" E	Maratua Island, Berau, East Kalimantan
22	1° 46' 53" N	119° 02' 26" E	Sambit Island, Berau, East Kalimantan
23	00° 59' 55" N	120° 12' 50" E	Lingian Island, Tolitoli, Central Sulawesi
24	1° 20' 16" N	120° 47' 31" E	Salando Island, Tolitoli, Central Sulawesi
25	1° 22' 40" N	120° 53' 04" E	Dolangan Island, Tolitoli, Central Sulawesi
26	1° 22' 41" N	120° 53' 07" E	Dolangan Island, Tolitoli, Central Sulawesi
27	1° 18' 48" N	121° 26' 36" E	Tanjung Kramat,
28	1° 08' 17" N	122° 25' 47" E	Karang Boliogut,
29	1° 02' 52" N	123° 06' 45" E	Bangkit Island, Bolaang Mongondow, North Sulawesi
30	1° 09' 29" N	124° 20' 38" E	Laimpangi, North Sulawesi
31	1° 45' 47" N	124° 43' 51" E	Manterawu Island, Bolaang Mongondow, North Sulawesi
32	2° 44' 15" N	125° 09' 28" E	Makalehi, Sangihe, North Sulawesi
33	4° 14' 06" N	125° 18' 59" E	Kawalusu, Sangihe, North Sulawesi
34	4° 40' 16" N	125° 25' 41" E	Kawio Island, Sangihe, North Sulawesi
35	4° 44' 14" N	125° 28' 42" E	Marore Island, Sangihe, North Sulawesi
36	4° 44' 25" N	125° 28' 56" E	Marore Island, Sangihe, North Sulawesi
37	4° 44' 46" N	125° 29' 24" E	Batubawaikang Island, Sangihe, North Sulawesi
Philippine Sea
38	5° 34' 02" N	126° 34' 54" E	Miangas Island, Talaud Regency, North Sulawesi
39	5° 33' 57" N	126° 35' 29" E	Miangas Island, Talaud, North Sulawesi
40	4° 46' 18" N	127° 08' 32" E	Marampit Island, Talaud, North Sulawesi
41	4° 45' 39" N	127° 08' 44" E	Marampit Island, Talaud, North Sulawesi
42	4° 38' 38" N	127° 09' 49" E	Intata Island, Talaud, North Sulawesi
43	4° 37' 36" N	127° 09' 53" E	Kakarutan Island, North Sulawesi
Halmahera Sea
44	3° 45' 13" N	126° 51' 06" E	Tampida Island
45	2° 38' 44" N	128° 34' 27" E	Sopi Island
46	2° 25' 39" N	128° 41' 57" E	Tanjung Gorua
47	1° 34' 44" N	128° 44' 14" E	Tanjung Lelai
48	00° 43' 39" N	129° 08' 30" E	Jiew Island, Central Halmahera, North Maluku
Pacific Ocean
49	00° 32' 08" N	130° 43' 52" E	Budd Island, Raja Ampat regency, West Papua province
50	1° 05' 20" N	131° 15' 35" E	Fani Island, Raja Ampat, West Papua
51	1° 04' 28" N	131° 16' 49" E	Fani Island, Raja Ampat, West Papua
52	00° 20' 16" S	132° 09' 34" E	Miossu Island, Sorong, West Papua
53	00° 20' 34" S	132° 25' 20" E	Tanjung Yamursba, Papua
54	00° 21' 42" S	132° 43' 01" E	Tanjung Wasio, Papua
55	00° 56' 22" N	134° 17' 44" E	Fanildo Island, Biak Numfor Regency, Papua
56	00° 55' 57"	134° 20' 30" E	Bras Island, Biak Numfor, Papua
57	00° 23' 38" S	135° 16' 27" E	Bepondi Island, Supiori Regency, Papua
58	00° 41' 56" S	135° 51' 21" E	Tanjung Wasanbari
59	01° 04' 13" S	136° 23' 14" E	Tanjung Basari
60	01° 27' 23" S	137° 55' 51" E	Tanjung Narwaku
61	01° 34' 26" S	138° 42' 57" E	Liki Island, Sarmi Regency, Papua
62	2° 19' 12" S	140° 09' 07" E	Tanjung Kamdara
63	2° 26' 22" S	140° 36' 47" E	Tanjung Kelapa
64	2° 36' 16" S	141° 00' 00" E	Tanjung Oinake, Jayapura Regency, Papua; Northern terminus of the Indonesia-Papua New Guinea land border

♦ Basepoints modified by 2008 Government Regulation to take into account the International Court of Justice decision on the sovereignty of Sipadan and Ligitan Islands.

=== Arafura and Timor Seas ===
Point	Latitude	Longitude	Remarks
Arafura Sea
65	9° 07' 40" S	141° 01' 10" E	Torasi, Papua; Southern terminus of the Indonesia-Papua New Guinea land border
66	9° 10' 53" S	140° 59' 07" E	Torasi
67	9° 12' 13" S	140° 57' 27" E	Torasi
68	9° 12' 00" S	140° 56' 08" E	Torasi
69	9° 05' 42" S	140° 50' 58" E	Blatar
70	8° 16' 11" S	139° 26' 11" E	Karang Sametinke
71	8° 26' 09" S	138° 54' 23" E	Komoran
72	8° 26' 44" S	137° 39' 28" E	Salah
73	8° 12' 49" S	137° 41' 24" E	Kolepon Island
74	7° 49' 28" S	137° 50' 50" E	Korima
75	6° 21' 31" S	138° 23' 59" E	Cook
76	5° 58' 45" S	138° 03' 22" E	Gosong Triton
77	5° 23' 14" S	137° 43' 07" E	Laag Island
78	4° 54' 24" S	136° 45' 35" E	Tanjung Pohonbatu
79	4° 38' 41" S	136° 07' 14" E	Amarapya
80	5° 35' 42" S	134° 49' 05" E	Ararkula Island, Aru Islands Regency, Maluku
81	6° 00' 09" S	134° 54' 26" E	Karaweira Barat Island, Aru Islands Regency, Maluku
82	6° 19' 26" S	134° 54' 53" E	Panambulai Island, Aru Islands Regency, Maluku
83	6° 38' 50" S	134° 50' 12" E	Kultubai Utara Island, Aru Islands Regency, Maluku
84	6° 49' 54" S	134° 47' 14" E	Kultubai Selatan Island, Aru Islands Regency, Maluku
85	7° 01' 08" S	134° 41' 26" E	Karang Island, Aru Islands Regency, Maluku
86	7° 01' 48" S	134° 40' 38" E	Karang Island, Aru Islands Regency, Maluku
87	7° 06' 14" S	134° 31' 19" E	Enu Island, Aru Islands Regency, Maluku
88	7° 05' 23" S	134° 28' 18" E	Enu Island, Aru Islands Regency, Maluku
89	6° 57' 01" S	134° 11' 38" E	Batugoyang Island, Aru Islands Regency, Maluku
90	6° 00' 25"	S 132° 50' 42" E	Tanjung Weduar
91	7° 14' 26" S	131° 58' 49" E	Larat Island, Tanimbar Islands, Maluku Tenggara Barat Regency, Maluku
92	7° 39' 49" S	131° 43' 33" E	Karang Sarikilmasa
Timor Sea
93	8° 03' 07" S	131° 18' 02" E	Asutuban Island, Tanimbar Islands, Maluku Tenggara Barat Regency, Maluku
94	8° 03' 57" S	131° 16' 55" E	Asutuban Island, Tanimbar, Maluku Tenggara Barat Regency, Maluku
95	8° 10' 17" S	131° 07' 31" E	Selaru Timur Island, Tanimbar Islands, Maluku Tenggara Barat Regency, Maluku
96	8° 18' 27" S	130° 53' 20" E	Selaru Barat Island, Tanimbar, Maluku Tenggara Barat Regency, Maluku
97	8° 20' 30" S	130° 49' 16" E	Batarkusu Island, Maluku Tenggara Barat Regency, Maluku
98	8° 20' 41" S	130° 48' 47" E	Fursey,
99	8° 20' 54" S	130° 45' 21" E	Tanjung Arousu
100	8° 13' 29" S	129° 49' 32" E	Marsela Island, Babar Islands, Maluku Barat Daya Regency, Maluku
101	8° 21' 09" S	128° 30' 52" E	Meatimiarang Island, Maluku Barat Daya Regency, Maluku
101A♦	8° 14' 20" S	127° 38' 34" E	Tanjung Karang, Leti Island, Maluku Barat Daya Regency, Maluku
101B♦	8° 14' 17" S	127° 38' 04" E	Tanjung Kesioh, Leti Island, Maluku Barat Daya Regency, Maluku
Wetar Strait
101C♦	8° 06' 07" S	127° 08' 52" E	Tutun Yen, Kisar Island, Maluku Barat Daya Regency, Maluku
101D♦	7° 58' 31" S	126° 27' 59" E	Tutun Eden, Wetar Island, Maluku Barat Daya Regency, Maluku
101E♦	8° 03' 44" S	125° 44' 06" E	Lirang Island, Barat Daya Islands, Maluku Barat Daya Regency, Maluku
Ombai Strait
101F♦	8° 19' 04" S	125° 08' 25" E	Tanjung Lisomu, Alor Island, East Nusa Tenggara Province
101G♦	8° 21' 26" S	125° 03' 37" E	Tanjung Seromu, Alor Island
Sawu Sea
101H♦	8° 23’ 58" S	124° 47’ 10" E	Tanjung Sibera, Alor Island
101I♦	8° 57’ 26" S	124° 56’ 57" E	Mota Biku, Betun Regency on Timor Island, East Nusa Tenggara Province; Northern terminus of Indonesia-East Timor land border
Timor Sea
101J♦	9° 27’ 37" S	125° 05’ 20" E	Mota Talas, Betun Regency on Timor Island; Southern terminus of Indonesia-East Timor land border
102	9° 38' 09" S	124° 59' 39" E	Tanjung Wetoh, Timor Island
103	9° 52' 58" S	124° 45' 00" E	Tanjung Batu Merah, Timor
104	10° 07' 14" S	124° 28' 59" E	Tanjung Haikmeo, Timor
105	10° 10' 19" S	124° 23' 44" E	Tanjung Tunfano, Timor
106	10° 49' 47" S	123° 13' 22" E	Tanjung Puleh, Rote Island
107	11° 00' 36" S	122° 52' 37" E	Ndana Island, off Rote Island

♦ Additional basepoints added in 2008 to modify baselines after the independence of East Timor.

=== Indian Ocean ===
Point	Latitude	Longitude	Remarks
Indian Ocean
107	11° 00' 36" S	122° 52' 37" E	Ndana Island, off Rote Island, East Nusa Tenggara
108	10° 37' 37" S	121° 50' 15" E	Tanjung Merebu, Sawu Island, East Nusa Tenggara
109	10° 50' 00" S	121° 16' 57" E	Dana Island, Sumba Timur Regency, Sumba Island, East Nusa Tenggara
110	10° 49' 54" S	121° 16' 38" E	Dana Island, Sumba Timur Regency, Sumba
111	10° 19' 02" S	120° 27' 13" E	Tanjung Ngunju, Sumba Timur Regency, Sumba
112	10° 20' 22" S	120° 07' 02" E	Mangudu Island, Sumba Timur Regency, Sumba
113	10° 20' 08" S	120° 05' 56" E	Mangudu Island, Sumba Timur Regency, Sumba
114	9° 41' 55" S	119° 03' 27" E	Tanjung Merapu
115	9° 33' 46" S	118° 55' 29" E	Tanjung Karoso
116	8° 53' 22" S	118° 28' 02" E	Toro Doro
117	9° 06' 15" S	117° 03' 25" E	Tanjung Talonan
118	9° 06' 37" S	117° 00' 46" E	Tanjung Talonan
119	8° 55' 20" S	116° 00' 08" E	Sophialouisa Island
120	8° 49' 11" S	115° 35' 13" E	Tanjung Sedihing
121	8° 51' 06" S	115° 10' 32" E	Tanjung Ungasan
122	8° 50' 56" S	115° 06' 31" E	Tanjung Mebulu
123	8° 47' 14" S	114° 31' 33" E	Tanjung Bantenan
124	8° 30' 30" S	113° 17' 37" E	Barung Island
125	8° 24' 24" S	111° 42' 31" E	Sekel Island
126	8° 22' 17" S	111° 30' 41" E	Panehan Island
127	8° 12' 03" S	110° 42' 31" E	Tanjung Batur
127A♦	8° 06' 05"S	110° 26' 20" E	Tanjung Ngeres Langu
127B♦	7° 46' 39" S	109° 25' 52" E	Batu Tugur
128	7° 47' 05" S	109° 02' 34" E	Nusakambangan Island
129	7° 49' 17" S	108° 25' 57" E	Tanjung Legokjawa
130	7° 49' 11" S	108° 19' 18" E	Manuk Island
131	7° 49' 03" S	108° 17' 55" E	Tanjung Tawulan
132	7° 44' 32" S	107° 50' 32" E	Tanjung Gedeh
133	7° 23' 20" S	106° 24' 14" E	Ujung Genteng
134	7° 01' 00" S	105° 31' 25" E	Tanjung Deli
135	6° 51' 17" S	105° 15' 44" E	Karang Pabayang
136	6° 50' 22" S	105° 14' 20" E	Tanjung Guhakolak
137	5° 53' 45" S	104° 26' 26" E	Batukecil Island
138	5° 14' 22" S	103° 54' 57" E	Ujung Walor
139	5° 30' 50" S	102° 21' 11" E	Tanjung Kahoabi
140	5° 31' 13" S	102° 16' 00" E	Tanjung Labuho
141	5° 30' 30" S	102° 14' 42" E	Tanjung Labuho
142	5° 21' 35" S	102° 05' 04" E	Tanjung Kooma
143	4° 01' 12" S	101° 01' 49" E	Mega Island
144	3° 17' 48" S	100° 19' 47" E	Sibarubaru Island
145	2° 50' 14" S	99° 59' 55" E	Tanjung Betumonga
146	1° 51' 58" S	99° 04' 34" E	Sinyaunyau Island
147	1° 40' 43" S	98° 52' 35" E	Tanjung Simansih
148	1° 13' 32" S	98° 36' 07" E	Tanjung Sakaladat
149	00° 05' 33" S	97° 51' 14" E	Simuk Island
150	00° 04' 05" S	97° 50' 07" E	Simuk Island
151	1° 12' 47" N	97° 04' 48" E	Wunga Island
152	1° 24' 19" N	97° 03' 38" E	Tanjung Toyolawa, Nias Island, North Sumatra
153	2° 31' 47" N	95° 55' 05" E	Simeulucut Island, Aceh Province
154	2° 57' 51" N	95° 23' 34" E	Salaut Besar Island, Aceh
155	2° 58' 57" N	95° 23' 06" E	Salaut Besar Island, Aceh
156	4° 52' 33" N	95° 21' 46" E	Raya Island, Aceh
157	5° 16' 34" N	95° 12' 07" E	Rusa Island, Aceh
158	5° 47' 34" N	94° 58' 21" E	Benggala Island, Aceh
159	6° 04' 30" N	95° 06' 45" E	Rondo Island, Aceh
160	6° 04' 30" N	95° 07' 11" E	Rondo Island, Aceh

♦ Basepoints added in 2008.

=== Straits of Malacca ===
Point	Latitude	Longitude	Remarks
Straits of Malacca
160	6° 04' 30" N	95° 07' 11" E	Rondo Island, Aceh Province
161	5° 53' 50" N	95° 20' 03" E	Ujung Le Meule, Aceh
162	5° 30' 12" N	95° 53' 16" E	Ujung Pidie, Aceh
163	5° 16' 31" N	96° 49' 57" E	Ujung Peusangan, Aceh
164	5° 15' 04" N	97° 29' 40" E	Tanjung Jamboaye, Aceh
165	5° 13' 01" N	97° 32' 54" E	Paru Buso Island, Aceh
166	4° 53' 38" N	97° 54' 49" E	Ujung Peureula, Aceh
167	4° 25' 36" N	98° 17' 15" E	Ujung Tamiang, Aceh
168	3° 46' 38" N	99° 30' 03" E	Berhala Island, North Sumatra Province
169	2° 52' 10" N	100° 41' 05" E	Batu Mandi Island, North Sumatra
170	2° 05' 42" N	101° 42' 30" E	Tanjung Punah, Rupat Island, Riau Province
171	1° 31' 29" N	102° 28' 13" E	Tanjung Parit, Bengkalis Island, Riau
172	1° 06' 04" N	102° 58' 11" E	Tanjung Kedabu, Rangsang Island, Riau
173	1° 11' 30" N	103° 21' 08" E	Iyu Kecil Island, Karimun Regency, Riau Islands Province
174	1° 09' 59" N	103° 23' 20" E	Karimun Kecil Island, Karimun, Riau Islands
Singapore Straits
175	1° 09' 13" N	103° 39' 11" E	Nipah Island, Batam, Riau Islands Province
176	1° 09' 12" N	103° 39' 21" E	Nipah Island, Batam
177	1° 07' 44" N	103° 41' 58" E	Pelampong Island, Batam
178	1° 07' 27" N	103° 46' 30" E	Karang Helen Mars, Batam
179	1° 09' 26" N	103° 48' 50" E	Karang Benteng, Batam
180	1° 11' 06" N	103° 52' 57" E	Batu Berhanti, Batam
181	1° 12' 29" N	104° 04' 47" E	Nongsa Island, Batam
182	1° 12' 16" N	104° 23' 37" E	Tanjung Sading, Bintan Island, Riau Islands Province
183	1° 14' 35" N	104° 33' 22" E	Tanjung Berakit, Bintan
1	1° 14' 27" N	104° 34' 32" E	Tanjung Berakit, Bintan

== See also ==
- Exclusive economic zone of Indonesia
