= Ceratodoris nakamotoensis =

Scientific classification
- Kingdom: Animalia
- Phylum: Mollusca
- Class: Gastropoda
- Order: Nudibranchia
- Family: Goniodorididae
- Genus: Ceratodoris
- Species: C. nakamotoensis

Binomial name
- Ceratodoris nakamotoensis (Hamatani, 2001)

Synonyms
- Hopkinsia nakamotoensis Hamatani, 2001; Okenia nakamotoensis (Hamatani, 2001)

Species of gastropod

Okenia nakamotoensis is a species of sea slug, specifically a dorid nudibranch, a marine gastropod mollusc in the subfamily Goniodoridinae in the family Goniodorididae.

== Distribution ==
This species was described from Japan. It is known from Bohol and Cebu Islands, Philippines, Indonesia and the Marshall Islands. It has also been reported from Mabul, Malaysia and Mayotte, Indian Ocean.

== Description ==
This Ceratodoris has a narrow, almost cylindrical, body and long lateral papillae. There is one mid-dorsal papilla in front of the gills. The body is bright pink and just the bases of the mantle processes are white. In animals from the Philippines and the Marshall Islands the white pigment extends onto the body as a broken line joining the bases of the papillae and as spots and streaks.

== Ecology ==
The diet of this species is the bryozoan Tropidozoum cellariforme Harmer, 1957. This sea slug is very similar to Ceratodoris kondoi and can be found with that species on the same food. There are two other species from northern Australia, which are also similar to this species, and those are Ceratodoris stellata and Ceratodoris hallucigenia.
