= Ceratodoris hallucigenia =

Scientific classification
- Kingdom: Animalia
- Phylum: Mollusca
- Class: Gastropoda
- Order: Nudibranchia
- Family: Goniodorididae
- Genus: Ceratodoris
- Species: C. hallucigenia

Binomial name
- Ceratodoris hallucigenia (Rudman, 2004)

Synonyms
- Okenia hallucigenia Rudman, 2004

Species of gastropod

Ceratodoris hallucigenia is a species of sea slug, specifically a dorid nudibranch, a marine gastropod mollusc in the subfamily Goniodoridinae in the family Goniodorididae.

== Etymology ==
This species was named because of its resemblance to the shape of the Cambrian fossil Hallucigenia.

== Distribution ==
This species was described from Australia. It is known from central New South Wales north to Northern Australia and on the west coast south to Kimberley in Western Australia.

== Description ==
This Ceratodoris has a narrow body and long lateral papillae. The body is bright pink and just the tips of the mantle processes, the gills and the rhinophores are a deeper pink.

== Ecology ==
The diet of this species is the bryozoan Pleurotoichus clathratus. This sea slug is very similar to Okenia stellata, and can be found with that species on the same food. There are two other species from southern Japan, the Marshall Islands, the Philippines and Indonesia which are also similar to this species, and those are Ceratodoris nakamotoensis and Ceratodoris kondoi.
