= Ceratodoris stellata =

Scientific classification
- Kingdom: Animalia
- Phylum: Mollusca
- Class: Gastropoda
- Order: Nudibranchia
- Family: Goniodorididae
- Genus: Ceratodoris
- Species: C. stellata

Binomial name
- Ceratodoris stellata (Rudman, 2004)

Synonyms
- Okenia stellata Rudman, 2004

Species of gastropod

Ceratodoris stellata is a species of sea slug, specifically a dorid nudibranch, a marine gastropod mollusc in the subfamily Goniodoridinae in the family Goniodorididae.

== Distribution ==
This species was described from Australia. It is known from central New South Wales north to Northern Australia and on the west coast south to Kimberley in Western Australia.

== Description ==
This Ceratodoris has an ovate body and long lateral papillae held in a radiating pattern. The body is bright pink and just the tips of the mantle processes, the gills and the rhinophores are a deeper pink. There is a pattern of thin red lines on the back.

== Ecology ==
The diet of this species is the bryozoan Pleurotoichus clathratus. It is very similar to Ceratodoris hallucigenia and can be found with this species on the same food. Ceratodoris nakamotoensis and Ceratodoris kondoi are a pair of species from southern Japan, the Marshall Islands, the Philippines and Indonesia which are also similar to this species.
