= Ceratodoris kondoi =

Scientific classification
- Kingdom: Animalia
- Phylum: Mollusca
- Class: Gastropoda
- Order: Nudibranchia
- Family: Goniodorididae
- Genus: Ceratodoris
- Species: C. kondoi

Binomial name
- Ceratodoris kondoi (Hamatani, 2001)

Synonyms
- Okenia kondoi (Hamatani, 2001); Sakishimaia kondoi Hamatani, 2001

Species of gastropod

Ceratodoris kondoi is a species of sea slug, specifically a dorid nudibranch, a marine gastropod mollusc in the subfamily Goniodoridinae in the family Goniodorididae.

== Distribution ==
This species was described from Japan. It is known from Bohol and Cebu Islands, Philippines and the Marshall Islands.

== Description ==
This Ceratodoris has a narrow, almost cylindrical, body and long lateral papillae. There is one mid-dorsal papilla in front of the gills. The body is bright pink and just the bases of the mantle processes are white. In animals from the Philippines and the Marshall Islands the white pigment extends onto the body as a broken line joining the bases of the papillae and as spots and streaks.

== Ecology ==
The diet of this species is the bryozoan Tropidozoum cellariforme Harmer, 1957. This sea slug is very similar to Ceratodoris nakamotoensis and can be found with that species on the same food. There are two other species from northern Australia, which are also similar to this species, and those are Ceratodoris stellata and Ceratodoris hallucigenia.
