= Sebatik Island =

Island in Indonesia and Malaysia

Native name: Pulau Sebatik
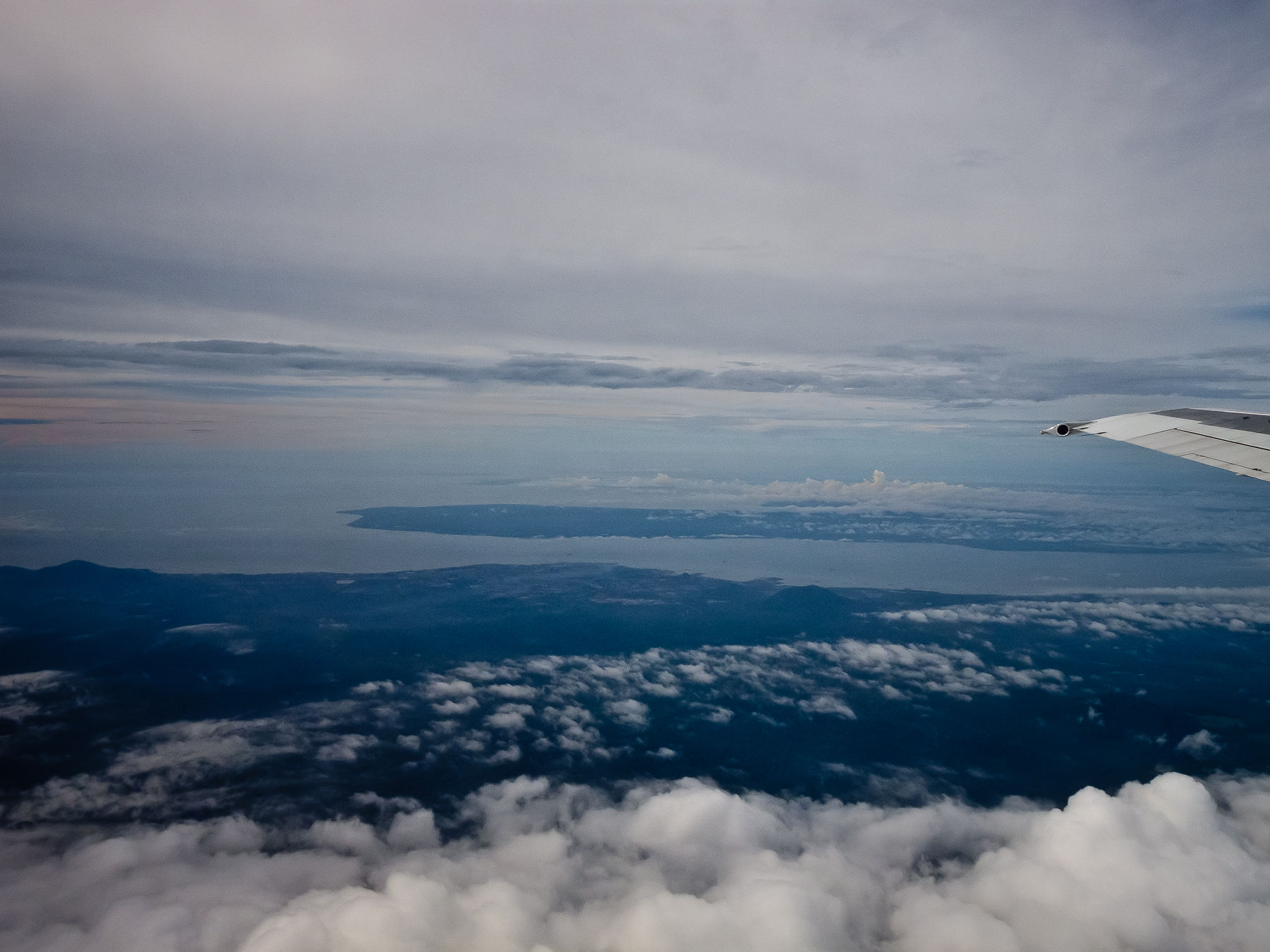
- Aerial view of the entrance to Cowie Bay. In the background Sebatik Island. In the foreground, next to the sea, Tawau Town. Taken from an aeroplane, heading west.

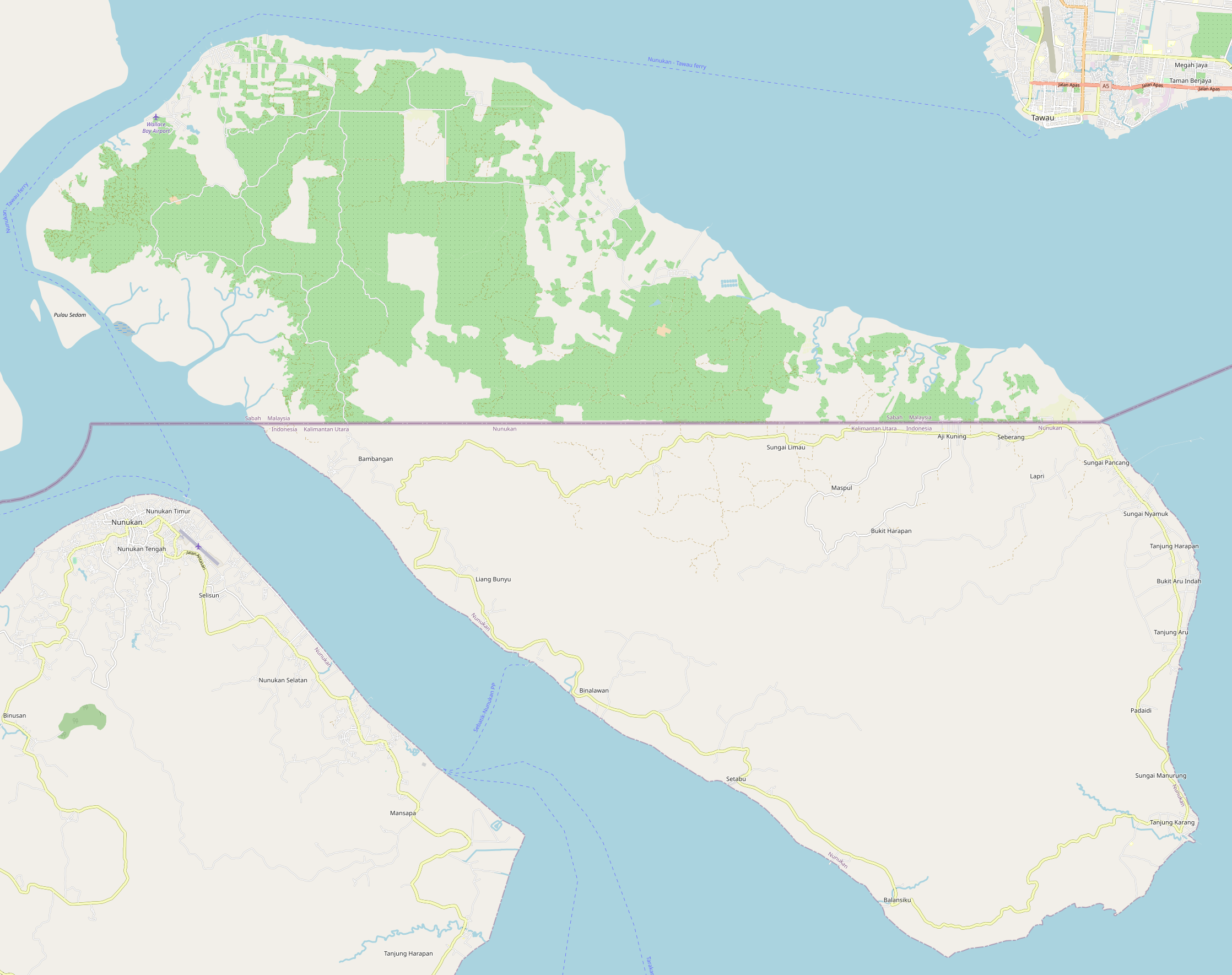
- Map showing Sebatik Island and the Indonesia–Malaysia border that cuts across it.

Geography
- Location: Celebes Sea
- Coordinates: 4°10′02″N 117°47′02″E
- Archipelago: Malay Archipelago
- Area: 452.2 km^{2} (174.6 sq mi)

Administration
- Malaysia
- State: Sabah
- Division: Tawau
- District: Tawau
- Indonesia
- Province: North Kalimantan
- Regency: Nunukan
- District: Central Sebatik, East Sebatik, North Sebatik, Sebatik, West Sebatik

Demographics
- Population: 25,000 (Malaysian side); 57,597 (Indonesian side)
- Languages: Indonesian; Malay; Nunukan Tidung; Buginese; Javanese; Buton
- Ethnic groups: Bugis; Javanese; Tidung

Additional information
- Time zone: Malaysian Standard Time/Central Indonesian Time (UTC+8)

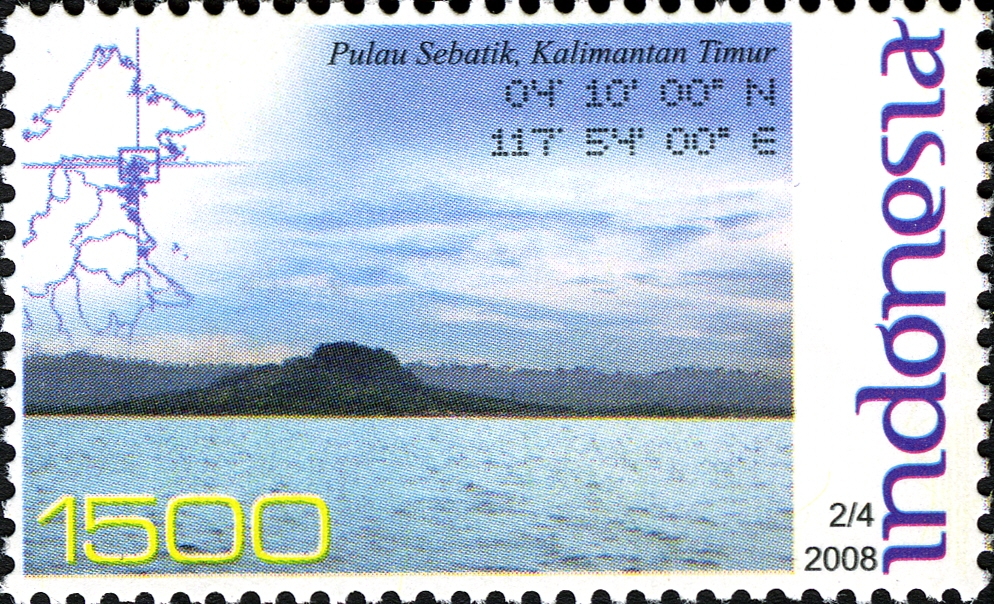
2008 Indonesian stamp featuring Sebatik Island

Sebatik Island (Indonesian: Pulau Sebatik; Malay: Pulau Sebatik) is an island off the eastern coast of Borneo, split between Indonesia and Malaysia. It is one of the 92 officially listed outlying islands of Indonesia.

== Geography ==
Sebatik has an area of approximately 452.2 square kilometres (174.6 sq mi). The minimum distance between Sebatik Island and Borneo is about 1 kilometre (0.62 mi).

Sebatik Island lies between Cowie Bay (also known as Teluk Tawau) to the north and Sibuku Bay (Teluk Sibuku) to the south. The town of Tawau, Sabah, is just to the north. The island is bisected at roughly 4° 10' north by the Indonesia–Malaysia border – the northern part belongs to Sabah, Malaysia (Sebatik Malaysia) while the southern part belongs to North Kalimantan (previously East Kalimantan), Indonesia (Sebatik Indonesia).

The Malaysia side of Sebatik had a population of approximately 25,000 as of 2008; while there were 47,571 people in Indonesian side of Sebatik as of the 2020 census. The population of the Indonesian part had an estimated population of 57,597 as of 2025.

=== Political divisions ===
Indonesian Sebatik consists of 5 districts belonging to the Nunukan Regency of North Kalimantan.

== History ==
The demarcated international border between Malaysia and Indonesia stops at the eastern edge of Sebatik Island, so that the ownership of Unarang Rock and the maritime area located to the east of Sebatik is unclear. This is one of the reasons why the Ambalat region waters and crude oil deposits east of Sebatik Island have been the centre of an active maritime dispute between Indonesia and Malaysia since March 2005. The ambiguity of the border at the eastern edge also caused a dispute over two nearby islands of Sipadan and Ligitan, both south of 4° 10' N but administered by Malaysia. The territorial dispute was resolved by the International Court of Justice in 2002 which awarded the islands to Malaysia. While there were still outstanding border issues on Sebatik Island that remained unresolved, negotiations from April 2026 formally gave Indonesia 127.3 hectares of land previously alloted to Malaysia following the completion of a bilateral land boundary demarcation. However, the Malaysian side later clarified based on the boundary agreement that Indonesia had obtained 123 hectares, while Malaysia gained 5 hectares.

While there are border guards on the island, there is no immigration office, no customs house, no barbed-wire fence and no walls demarcating the border. Instead, the only evidence of a border are the concrete piles buried every kilometre from east to west.

When the Indonesia–Malaysia confrontation happened between 1963 and 1966, the island was heavily contested between Indonesian troops, and Malaysian and her Commonwealth allies. Naval ships, such as HMS Manxman, were sent to take part in the defence of Malaysian territories and waters.

The North Borneo Timbers company operated a logging concession on the island until the 1980s and its mostly expatriate employees lived in a self-contained community in Wallace Bay. Sebatik Malaysia is within the administrative division of Tawau. For electoral purposes, Sebatik falls within the parliamentary constituency of Kalabakan and the state assembly district of Sebatik.

Sitangkai Indonesia (at its closest points) is approximately 175 kilometres (109 mi) to Sitangkai, Tawi-Tawi, Philippines, the second-closest point between the two countries after the Miangas island in North Sulawesi.

== Economy ==
Small holder agriculture on the Indonesian side produces cocoa, which is sold to Malaysia.

== Attractions ==
In the village of Sungai Haji Kuning, there is a house known as the "Two Country House Tour" that is divided by the Malaysian-Indonesian border. Further along the border, within Pancang as well, a public swimming pool known as "North Sebatik Swimming Pool" bisects the international border.

== See also ==
- List of divided islands
- List of islands of Malaysia
- List of islands of Indonesia
- Line house
