= Baseline (sea) =

Line from which the limits of a state's territorial sea are measured;

A baseline, as defined by the United Nations Convention on the Law of the Sea, is the line along the coast from which the outer limits of a state's territorial sea and certain other maritime zones of jurisdiction are measured, such as a state's exclusive economic zone.

Maritime Zones under International Law

== Measurement of baseline ==
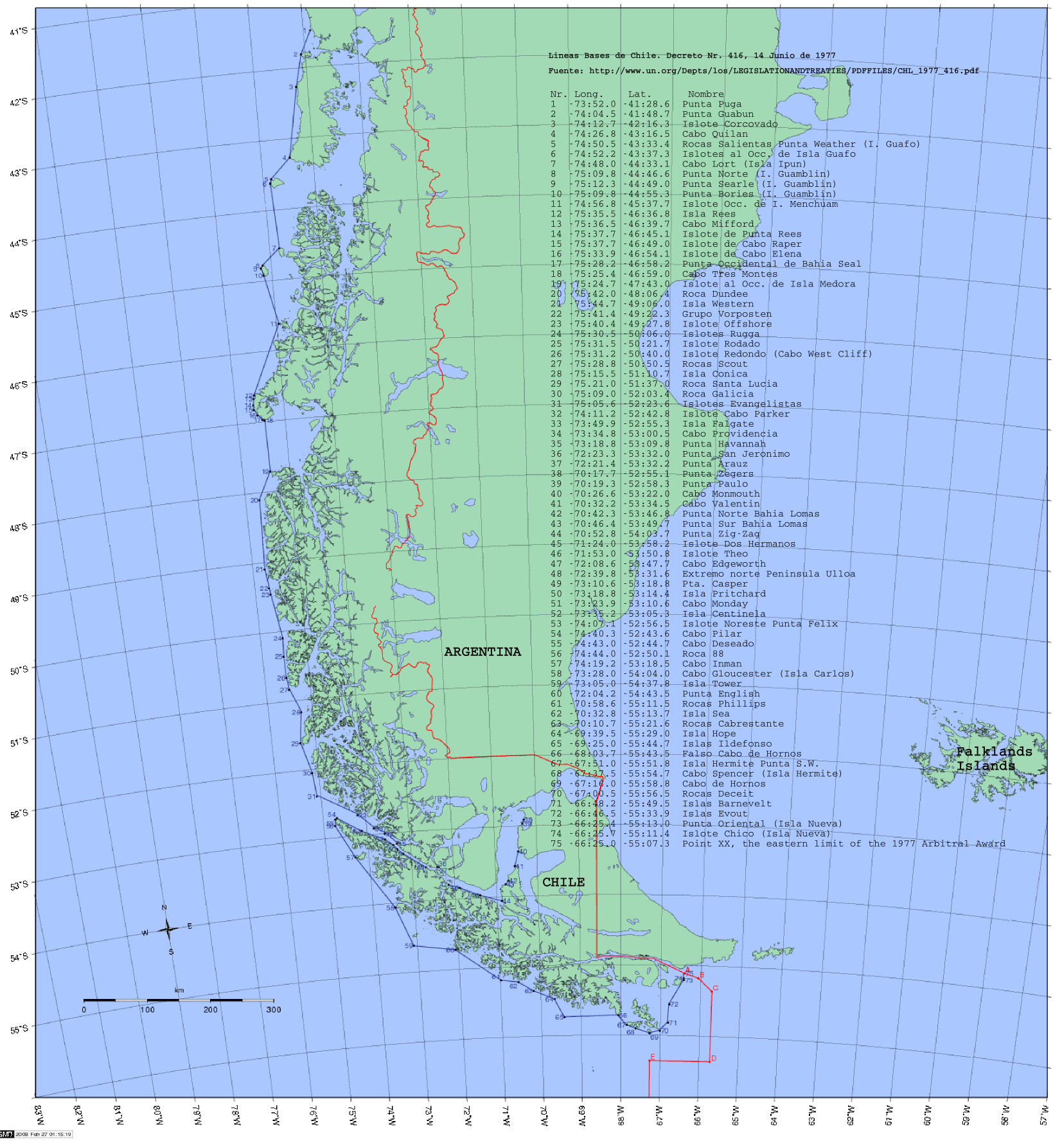
Chilean Baseline, an example of straight baseline use

The following methods are used to measure a baseline under the Law of the Sea Convention. In all cases, the baseline is drawn according to the state's own charts.

=== Normal baseline ===
In most cases, the baseline follows the low-water line of the coastal state. There are a variety of special rules and exceptions for a range of geological features, including bays, ports, rocks, artificial structures and reefs.

=== Straight baselines ===
The UN Convention allows for straight baselines to be drawn where deeply indented coastline and fringes of islands are closely connected to the coastline. Straight baselines must be drawn between the features and the coastline, in the general direction of the coast, and cannot be drawn across low-tide elevations. The Convention also prohibits straight baselines that would cut off another state's access to territorial sea or Exclusive Economic Zone. Since their introduction, countries including Canada and China have used straight baselines to extend their maritime borders.

== Particular baselines ==
- Baselines of the Chinese territorial sea
- Baselines of Indonesia
- Baselines of the Philippines

== See also ==
- International waters
