= Mabul Island =

Island in Malaysia

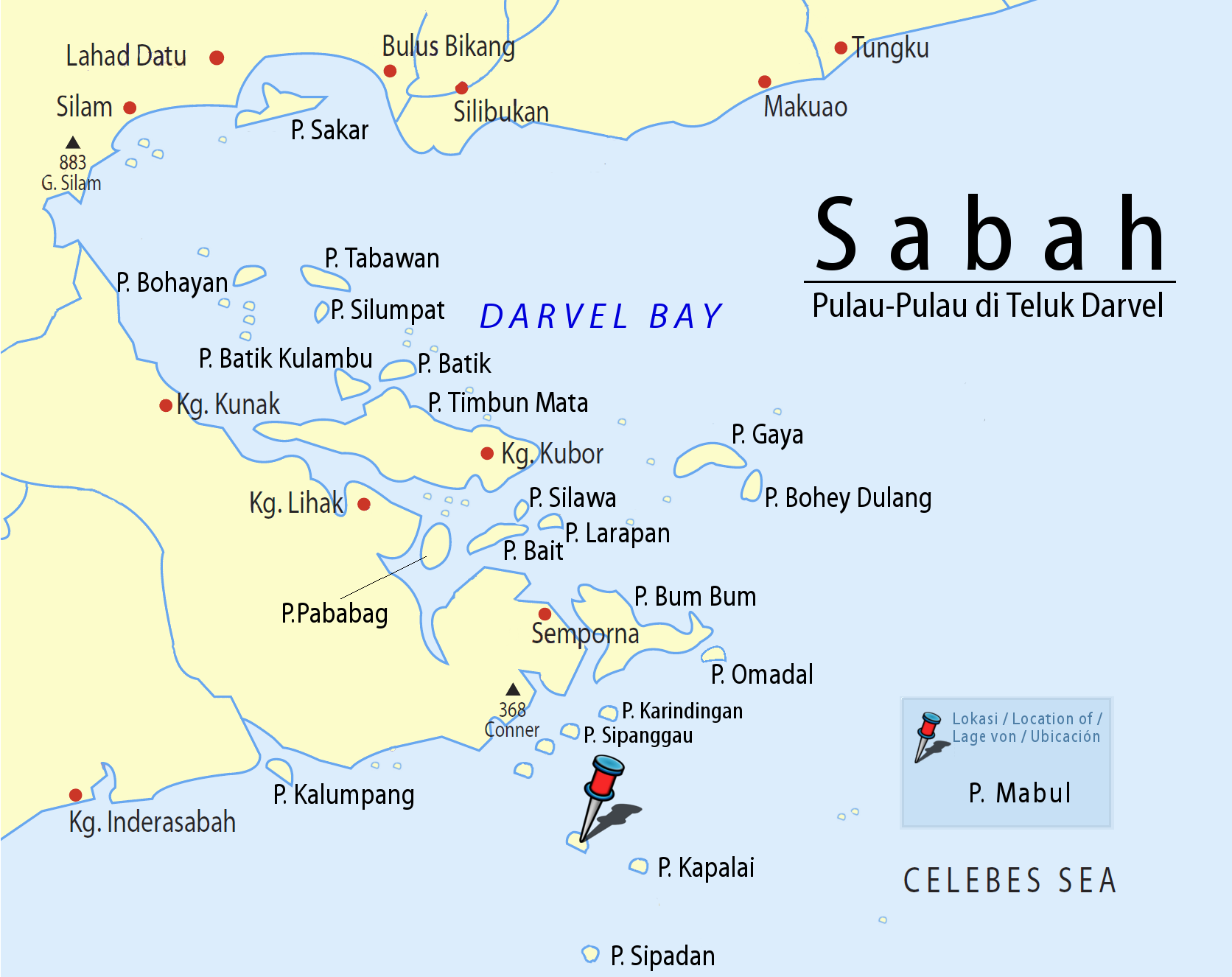
- Location of Mabul Island in Darvel Bay
- Interactive map of Mabul Island

Geography
- Coordinates: 4°14′45″N 118°37′52″E

Administration
- Malaysia
- State: Sabah
- Division: Tawau
- District: Semporna

Additional information
- Official website: https://www.mabul.com

Mabul (Malay: Pulau Mabul) is a small island near the southeastern coast of Sabah in Malaysia. The island has been a fishing village since the 1970s. After the 1990s, Mabul gained popularity with scuba divers due to its proximity to Sipadan island.

The island is roughly 15 km north of Sipadan, 0.2km^{2} in size, and around 2–3m above sea level. It is located on the northwest of a reef that is ~2 km long.

Mabul island is administered as a part of the Semporna, Tawau district.

== Etymology ==
According to Mr. Jamaluddin Supu (the village chief of Mabul island), the name "Mabul" originated from Arabic word called "makbul" which meant "good".

== History ==
The history of Mabul island is still unclear and only based on oral stories and various events in Sabah history. Mabul Island used to be under the influence of the Brunei Sultanate before the island, along with some part of North Borneo, was supposedly transferred to the Sulu Sultanate after the kingdom assisted the former during the Chermin War. Under the Sulu Sultanate, followers of Sulu Datu like the Bajau start to settle on the island to exploit the marine resources of the island. This island also became a stopping point for fisherman who harvest turtle eggs in Sipadan island. The island later on was controlled by the British North Borneo Chartered Company (BNBCC) which had a territorial dispute with the Dutch East Indies. The British argue that they gain control of this island through the 1878 Cession/Permanent Lease Agreement with the Sulu Sultanate, while the Dutch state that Mabul, along with the islands around it, are under the control of the Bulungan Sultanate (which was under the control of the Dutch). To settle this, the British and the Dutch signed the 1891 Anglo-Dutch Convention where Mabul became under British control. Under the British, not much importance was given to Mabul island due to the colonial policy of that time which favoured land-based economy compared to maritime-based economy.

After Sabah achieved its independence through the formation of Malaysia in 1963, this island became the attention of the local inhabitants where Bajau from mainland Sabah started to resettle on this island and also the arrival of Suluk and Bajau Laut immigrants from the Philippines due to the Moro Conflict. Moreover, the island began to receive global attention after it ,along with Sipadan island and Kapalai Reef, was designated as the world's greatest diving destination. The island play a role in marine-based eco-tourism industry development of Sabah especially after the tour operators of Sipadan island was ordered to move their business to Mabul during 2004.

== Native settlements ==
The two main settlements on the island are Kampung Mabul and Kampung Musu. The 1999 census recorded approximately 2,000 villagers living in Mabul; half of their children are under 14 years of age. The majority are immigrants from a chain of islands in the southern Philippines. These residents are mainly Bajau Laut and Suluk Muslims who live a nomadic lifestyle.

Basic amenities include a mosque, schools, community and fishermen's hall. The main transportation mode between places is via boat.

As most residents mainly work as fishermen, the village's source of income depends on ocean-based products such as squid and fish. Traditional fishing methods are called "Payau" and "Sangkaliya". Mabul fishers prefer fishing close to the Malaysia–Philippine border, perhaps due to the abundance of fish stocks. An average fishing trip will take 3 to 5 days out at sea. When they return, their catches are sold at Semporna on the mainland.

As of 2020, the population of Mabul is around 2,000.

== Sea life and the reef ==
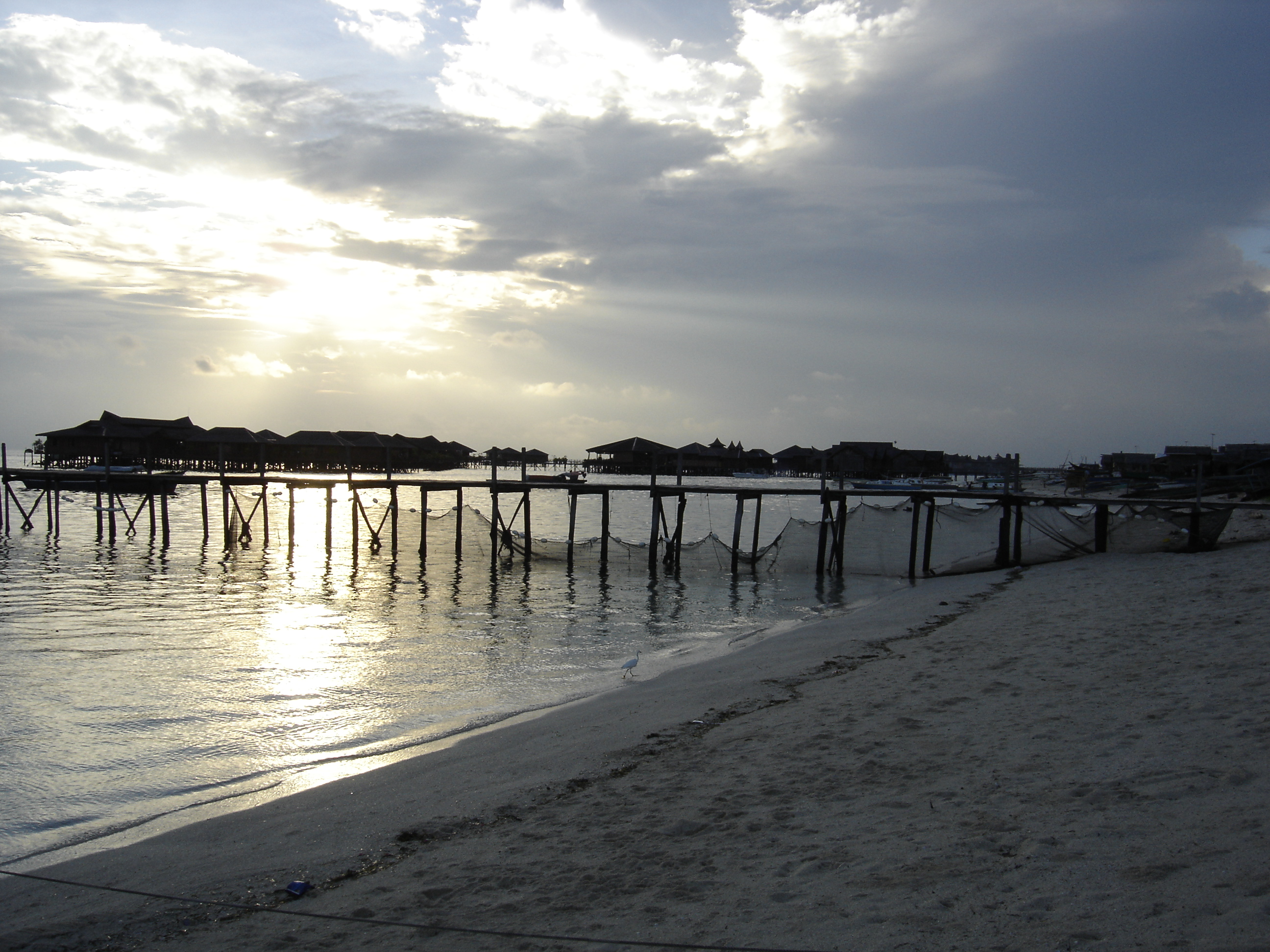
Mabul Island

Mabul's reef is on the edge of the continental shelf, and the seabed surrounding the reef slopes out to a depth of 25–30m.

Flamboyant cuttlefish, blue-ringed octopus, mimic octopus, and bobtail squids are common cephalopods found in the Mabul reef. Frogfish are prevalent; giant, painted, and clown frogfish are regularly seen along with most of the scorpion fish family.

== See also ==
- List of islands of Malaysia
