= Ligitan =

Island in Malaysia

Ligitan Island
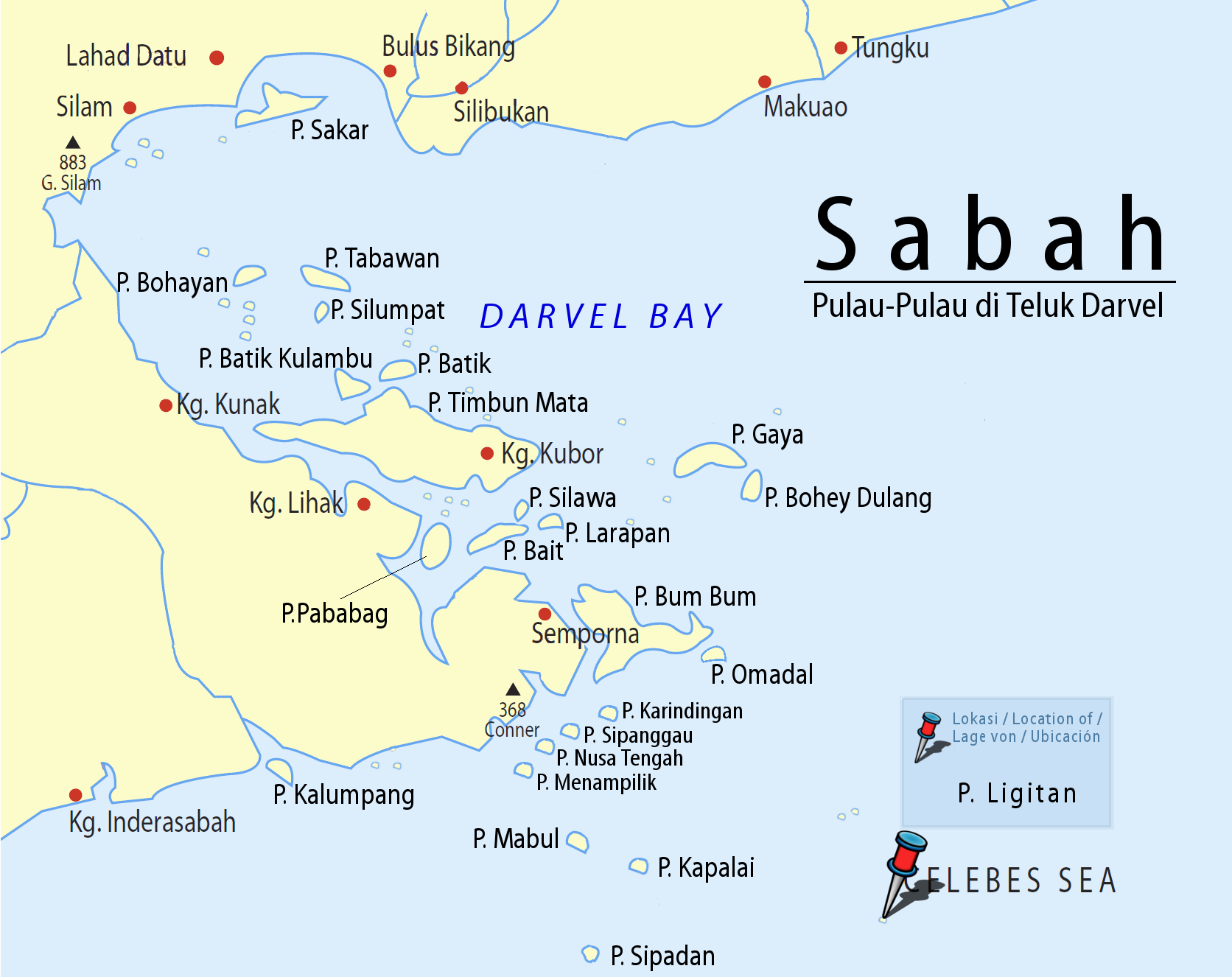
- Location of Ligitan Island in Darvel Bay of Celebes Sea
- Interactive map of Ligitan Island

Geography
- Coordinates: 4°9′0″N 118°53′0″E

Administration
- Malaysia
- State: Sabah
- Division: Tawau
- District: Semporna

Ligitan (Malay: Pulau Ligitan) is a small island in Tawau, Sabah, located east of the island of Borneo, in the Celebes Sea. In the past, the island was at the centre of a territorial dispute between Malaysia and Indonesia. The matter was brought for adjudication before the International Court of Justice and, at the end of 2002, the Court awarded the island along with the island of Sipadan to Malaysia, on the basis of the "effective occupation" displayed by the latter's predecessor (Malaysia's former colonial power, Great Britain) and the absence of any other superior title. The Philippines had applied to intervene in the proceedings on the basis of its claim to Northern Borneo, but its request was turned down by the Court early in 2001.

As a result of Filipino militant intrusion in 2000, the island management together with Sipadan was put under the Malaysian National Security Council (NSC). On 8 July 2019, Prime Minister Mahathir Mohamad has agreed in principle to return the management of both islands from the NSC back to the Sabah government under Sabah Tourism, Culture and Environment Ministry with the takeover will be done once the federal Cabinet approving the request.

== See also ==
- List of islands of Malaysia
