= Sipadan =

Oceanic island in Malaysia

Sipadan Island
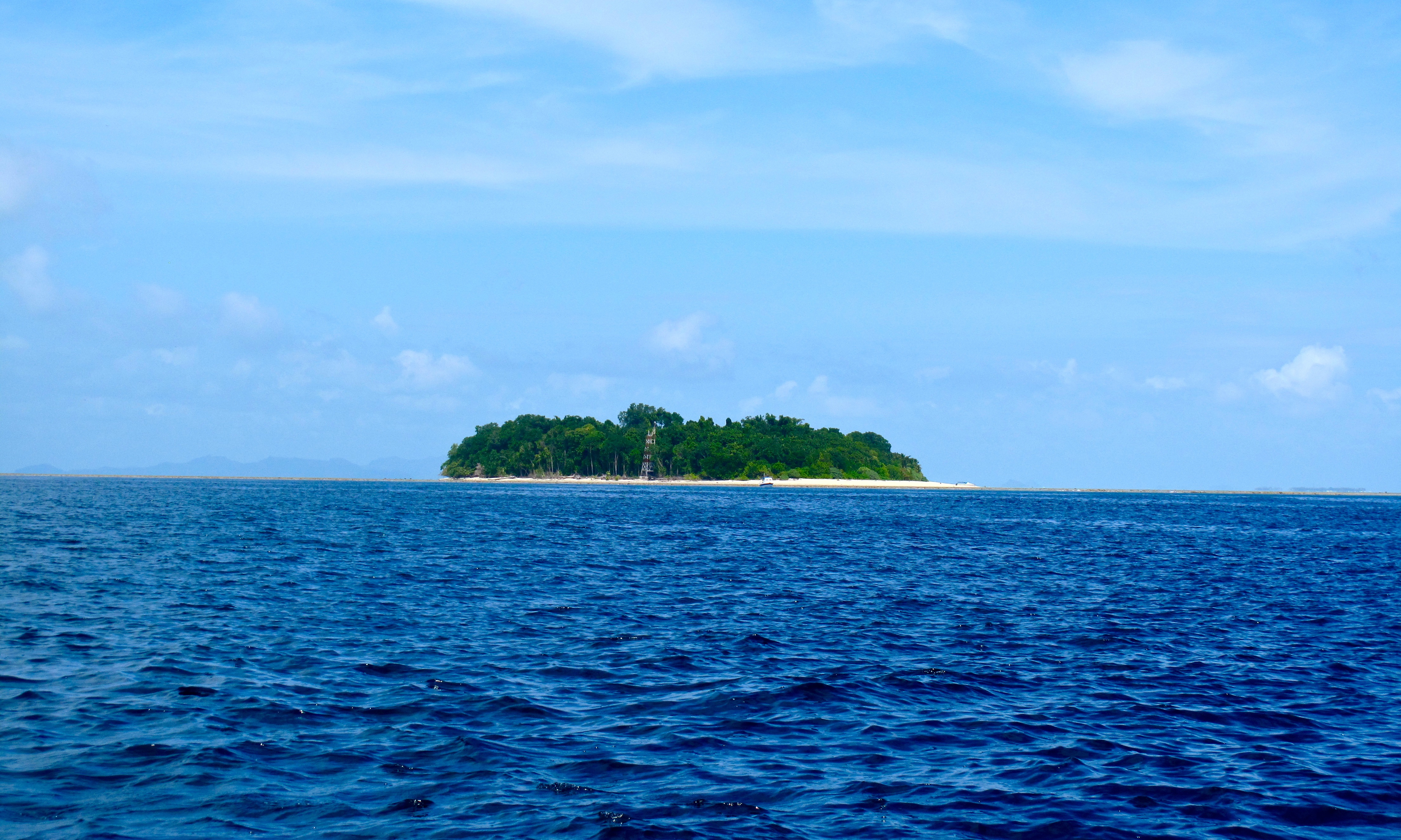
- Sipadan Island
- Interactive map of Sipadan Island

Geography
- Coordinates: 4°6′52.86″N 118°37′43.52″E

Administration
- Malaysia
- State: Sabah
- Division: Tawau
- District: Semporna

Sipadan (Malay: Pulau Sipadan) is the only oceanic island in Malaysia, rising 600 metres (2,000 ft) from the seabed. It is located in the Celebes Sea off the east coast of Sabah, Malaysia. It was formed by living corals growing on top of an extinct volcanic cone that took thousands of years to develop. Sipadan is located at the heart of the Indo-Pacific basin, the centre of one of the richest marine habitats in the world. More than 400 species of fish and hundreds of coral species have been classified in this ecosystem. The island sits within Sipadan Island Park, a marine park encompassing 16,860 hectares and managed by Sabah Parks.

== Political history ==
In the past, the island was at the centre of a territorial dispute between Malaysia and Indonesia. The matter was brought for adjudication before the International Court of Justice and, at the end of 2002, the Court awarded the island along with the island of Ligitan to Malaysia, on the basis of the "effective occupation" displayed by the latter's predecessor (Malaysia's former colonial power, the United Kingdom) and the absence of any other superior title. The Philippines had applied to intervene in the proceedings on the basis of their claim to Northern Borneo, but their request was turned down by the Court early in 2001.

=== Filipino militant attacks ===
On 23 April 2000, 21 people were kidnapped by the Filipino Moro pirate group Abu Sayyaf. The armed terrorists arrived by boat, forcing 10 tourists and 11 resort workers to board the vessels at gunpoint, after which they brought the victims to Jolo. All of the victims were eventually released. As a result of the attacks, the island management together with Ligitan was put under the Malaysian National Security Council (NSC). The perpetrators were jailed in 2024.

On 8 July 2019, Prime Minister Mahathir Mohamad has agreed in principle to return the management of both islands from the NSC back to the Sabah government under Sabah Tourism, Culture and Environment Ministry with the takeover will be done once the federal Cabinet approving the request.

== Biodiversity and conservation ==
The island was declared a bird sanctuary in 1933 by the colonial government of North Borneo and re-gazetted in 1963 by the Malaysian government. The coral reef ecosystems of Sipadan and nearby Mabul Island later received recognition as scuba diving destinations during the 1980s, with the first resort opening on Sipadan in 1984. In 2004, the island was declared a marine park by Sabah Parks and 6 hotel and resort facilities on the island were closed by authorities due to their impacts on the ecosystems. The area of protection was expanded by 6,846 hectares in 2015, bringing total area within Sipadan Island Park to 16,860 hectares.

The island's coral reefs have led to its international recognition as a scuba diving destination. In the film Borneo: The Ghost of the Sea Turtle (1989) Jacques Cousteau said: "I have seen other places like Sipadan, 45 years ago, but now no more. Now we have found an untouched piece of art". Visiting Sipadan Island requires a permit issued by Sabah Parks. Since 2019, there are 176 permits available each day, which are divided between the dive resorts and the dive centres. In 2016, four dive marshals were also appointed to monitor scuba diving activities on the island. The island was closed for 1 month in November 2023 in an effort to allow the ecosystem to recover from human disturbance.

Frequently seen in the waters around Sipadan are green and hawksbill turtles (which mate and nest there), enormous schools of barracuda in tornado-like formations as well as large schools of big-eye trevally and bumphead parrotfish. Pelagic species such as manta rays, eagle rays, scalloped hammerhead sharks and whale sharks also visit Sipadan. A turtle tomb lies underneath the column of the island, formed by an underwater limestone cave with a labyrinth of tunnels and chambers that contain many skeletal remains of turtles that become lost and drown before finding the surface. Killer whales have also been sighted around the island.

== Gallery ==
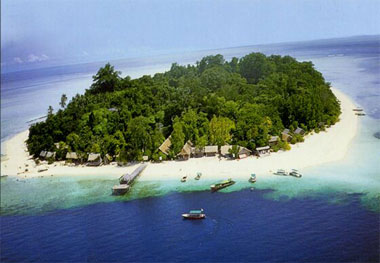
The island

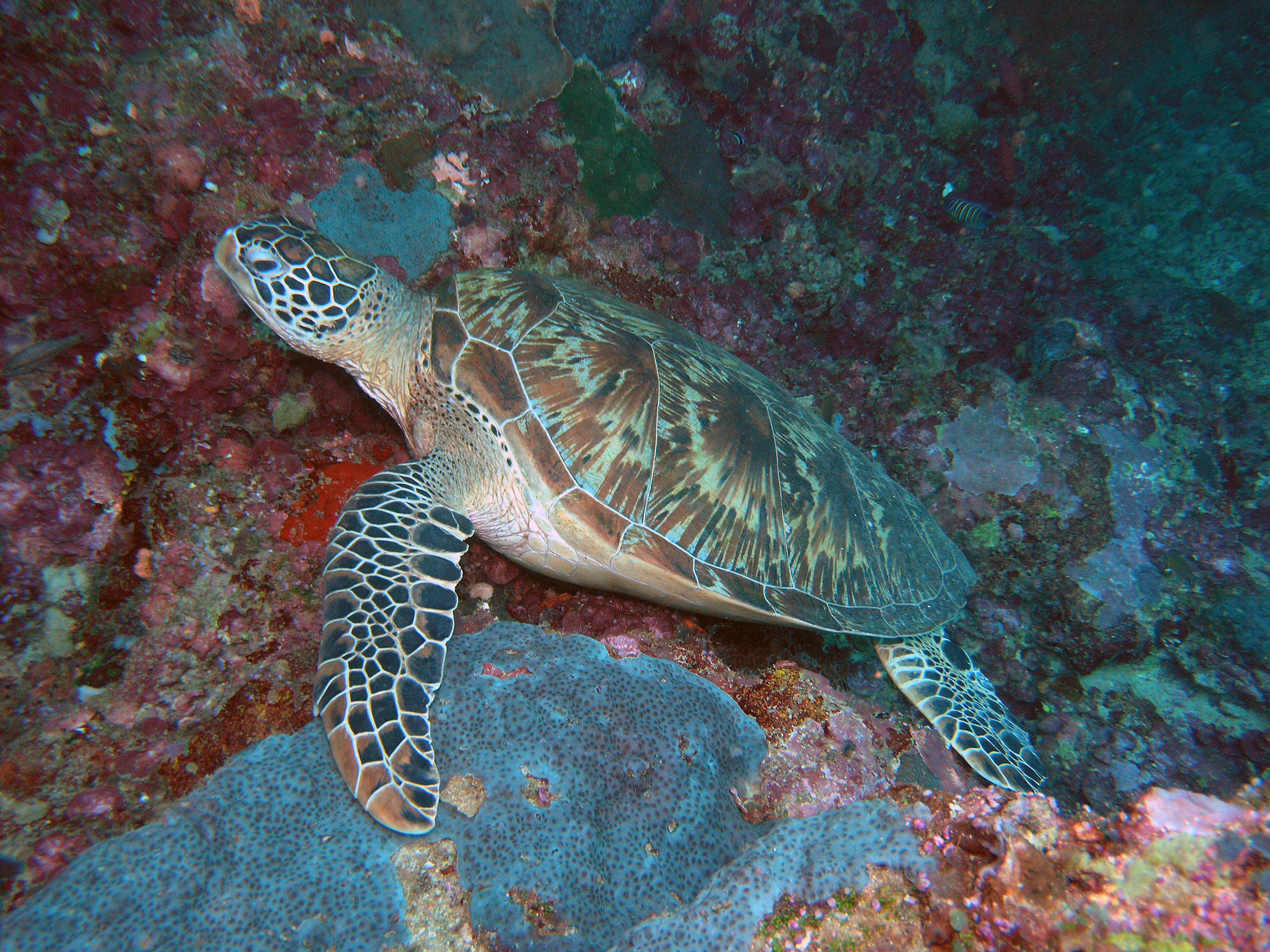
Green sea turtle

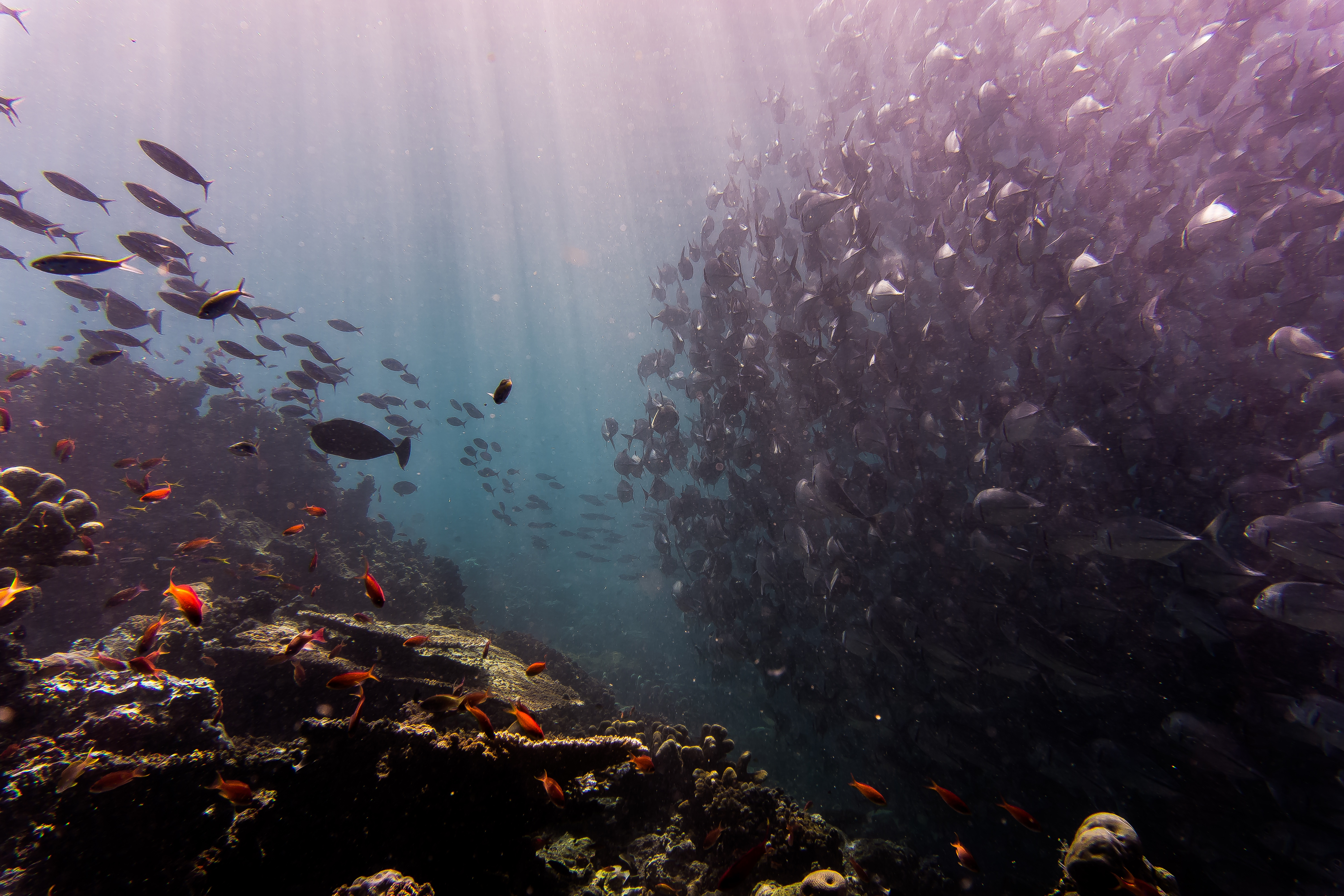
Beneath the island

== See also ==
- Mabul Island
