= Al-Kauthar Mosque =

Mosque in Tawau, Sabah, Malaysia

- Masjid Al-Kauthar
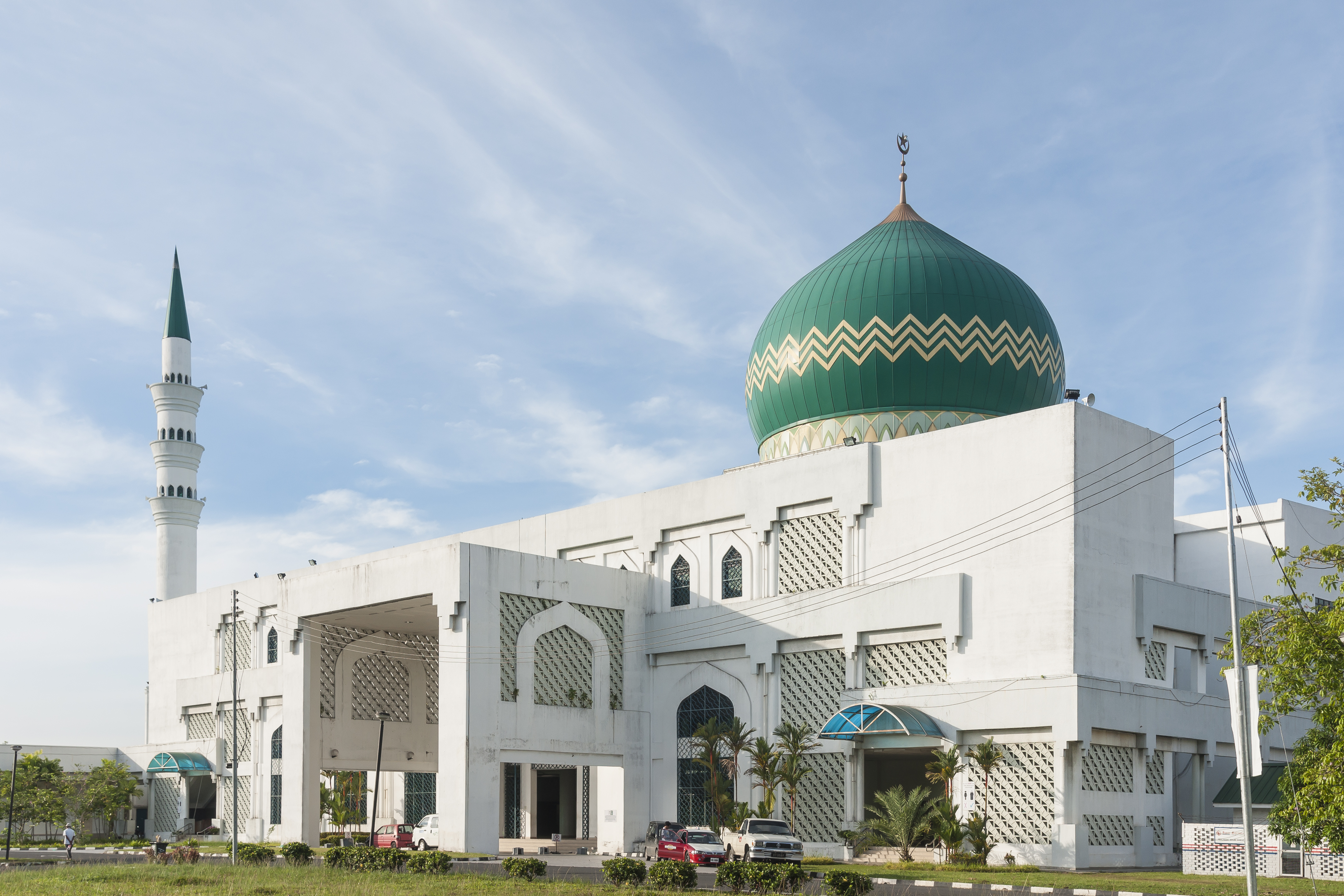

- Location of the mosque in Sabah

Religion
- Affiliation: Sunni Islam
- Ecclesiastical or organizational status: Mosque
- Status: Active

Location
- Location: Tawau, Sabah
- Country: Malaysia
- Interactive map of Al-Kauthar Mosque
- Coordinates: 4°14′N 117°53′E

Architecture
- Type: Mosque architecture
- Groundbreaking: 1997
- Completed: 2002
- Construction cost: RM31.5 million

Specifications
- Capacity: 17,000 worshippers
- Dome: One
- Minaret: One
- Minaret height: 58 m (190 ft)

The Al-Kauthar Mosque (Malay: Masjid Al-Kauthar), also known as Masjid Besar Tawau, is a Sunni mosque, located in Tawau, Sabah, Malaysia.

== Overview ==
Built in 1997 and completed in 2002, it is the largest mosque in the state of Sabah, with a capacity that can accommodate from 16,000 to 17,000 worshippers. The mosque was opened in 2004, officiated by the Yang di-Pertuan Agong at the time, Syed Sirajuddin Tuanku Syed Putra Jamalullail.

== See also ==
- Islam in Malaysia
- List of mosques in Malaysia
