= Malaysians of Indian descent in Sabah =

Malaysians of Indian descent in Sabah சபா இந்தியர்கள் Kaum India di Sabah
Total population
- 5,962; 2.5% of Sabah total population (2015)

Regions with significant populations
- Malaysia (Kota Kinabalu, Labuan, Lahad Datu, Sandakan and Tawau)

Languages
- Tamil (Malaysian Tamil) majority/dominant, Malaysian (Sabah Malay dialect) and English (Tanglish and Manglish); Other Indian languages: Telugu, Punjabi, Malayalam

Religion
- Hinduism (predominantly), Christianity, Sikhism, Islam, Buddhism, Baháʼí Faith

Related ethnic groups
- Other Malaysian Indians (Chitty, Malaysian Tamils, Malaysian Malayalis, Telugu Malaysians, Malaysian Punjabis), Chindian

Sabahan Indian (Tamil: சபா இந்தியர்கள்; Malay: Kaum India di Sabah), are a subset of Malaysian Indians that live primarily in the state of Sabah, Malaysia and the island territory of Labuan. Unlike Peninsular Malaysia, the Indian population in Sabah is very small. It consists mainly professionals from Peninsular Malaysia who have migrated or been transferred to Sabah and the neighbouring island territory of Labuan for work-related reasons (including their Sabah as well as Labuan-born descendants, plus those of mixed ancestry via means of intermarriage). However, there is also a small minority descended from immigrants who served in the British colonial military or police forces (which also exists until today albeit in smaller numbers).

The historical Indian population in Sabah largely consists of Sikh Punjabis (mostly widespread in the island federal territory of Labuan as well as the state capital of Kota Kinabalu) and Syrian Malabar Nasrani Christian Malayalees (scattered in some urban areas such as Kota Kinabalu, Penampang, Beaufort, Papar, etc.) who settled during the colonial era. In contrast, recent migrants, especially those who own and operate Mamak stalls, are nowadays mostly Tamil Muslims and Mappila Malayalees. Indians in Sabah form a significant portion of the state's professional community particularly in the areas of business, commerce, education and healthcare.

== History ==
The first Indians arrived in Sabah in the late 19th century, primarily as indentured labourers on British rubber plantations. After the completion of their indentureship, many Indians chose to remain in Sabah, establishing themselves as traders, merchants and artisans.

In the early 20th century, the Indian community in Sabah grew significantly with the arrival of professionals such as teachers, doctors, clerks and engineers. These individuals played a crucial role in the development of Sabah's education, socioeconomic and healthcare systems.

== Culture ==
=== Religion ===
Malaysian Indians in Sabah are predominantly Tamil, followed by smaller groups of Malayalees, Telugus, and Punjabis. They practice a variety of religions including Hinduism, Islam, Christianity, Buddhism, Baha'i and Sikhism.

=== Festival ===
Indian festivals such as Deepavali, Pongal, Vaisakhi and Thaipusam are celebrated with great enthusiasm by the Indian community in Sabah. Deepavali is also observed as a state public holiday in Sabah.

== Bibliography ==
- "The Indian Community in Sabah, Malaysia: A Historical Perspective" by K.S. Nathan (2010)
- "The Socioeconomic Status of Indians in Sabah, Malaysia" by S. Sothi and S. Singh (2005)
- "The Cultural Contributions of Indians to Sabah, Malaysia" by S. Arasaratnam (2008)
- "The Challenges Faced by Indians in Sabah, Malaysia" by P. Ramasamy (2007)
