= Cowie Bay =

Bay in the south of Sabah, Malaysia, Borneo

- Malay: Teluk Cowie
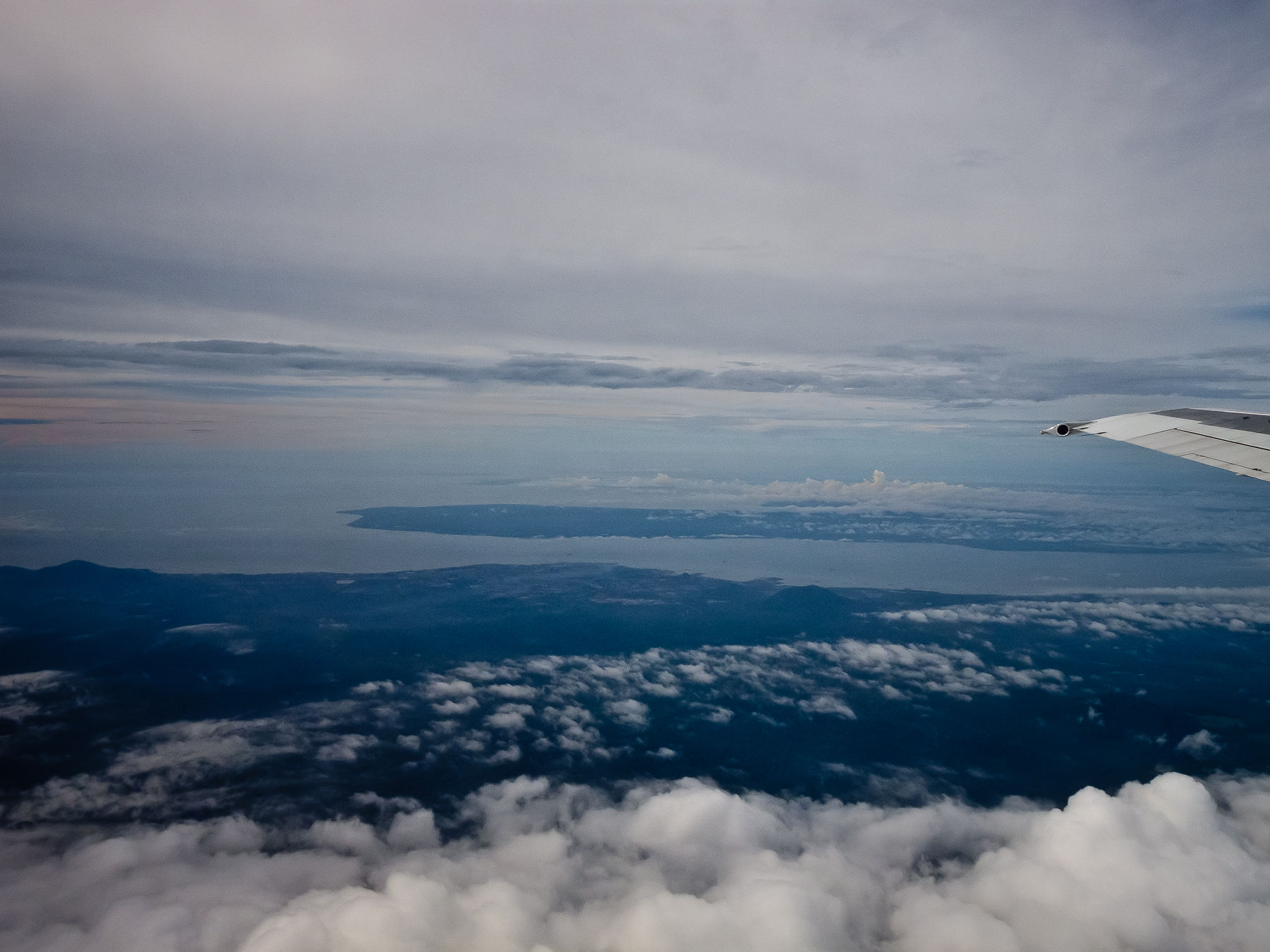
- Aerial View of the entrance to Cowie Bay. In the background is Sebatik Island. In the foreground, next to the sea, Tawau City.

- Location within Malaysia Cowie Bay (Malaysia)
- Location: Tawau District, Tawau Division, Sabah, Malaysia
- Coordinates: 4°16′30.73″N 117°47′30.7″E
- Type: Bay
- Part of: Celebes Sea
- River sources: Sungai Merutai, Sungai Kalabakan, Sungai Umas Umas, Sungai Brantian, Sungai Merutai Besar, Sungei Merutai Besar, Sungei Serudong
- Max. length: 50 kilometres (31 mi)
- Max. width: 10 kilometres (6.2 mi)
- Surface area: 120 square kilometres (46 sq mi)
- Average depth: 15 metres (49 ft)
- Islands: Sebatik Island
- Settlements: Tawau

Cowie Bay (Malay: Teluk Cowie) is a bay on the east coast of the island of Borneo. It is a part of the Malaysian state of Sabah and flows into the Celebes Sea. Administratively, it belongs to the Tawau District in the Tawau Division.

== Geography ==
The bay covers an area of approximately 120 km^{2}. At the end of the bay, there is an extensive shallow water area that is densely forested with mangrove swamps. The south side of the bay is bordered by Sebatik Island.

== History ==
The bay was named after William Clarke Cowie, who was an engineer, mariner, and businessman who helped establish British North Borneo and was Chairman of the British North Borneo Company.
