= Tawau =

- Town and district capital
- Bandar Tawau
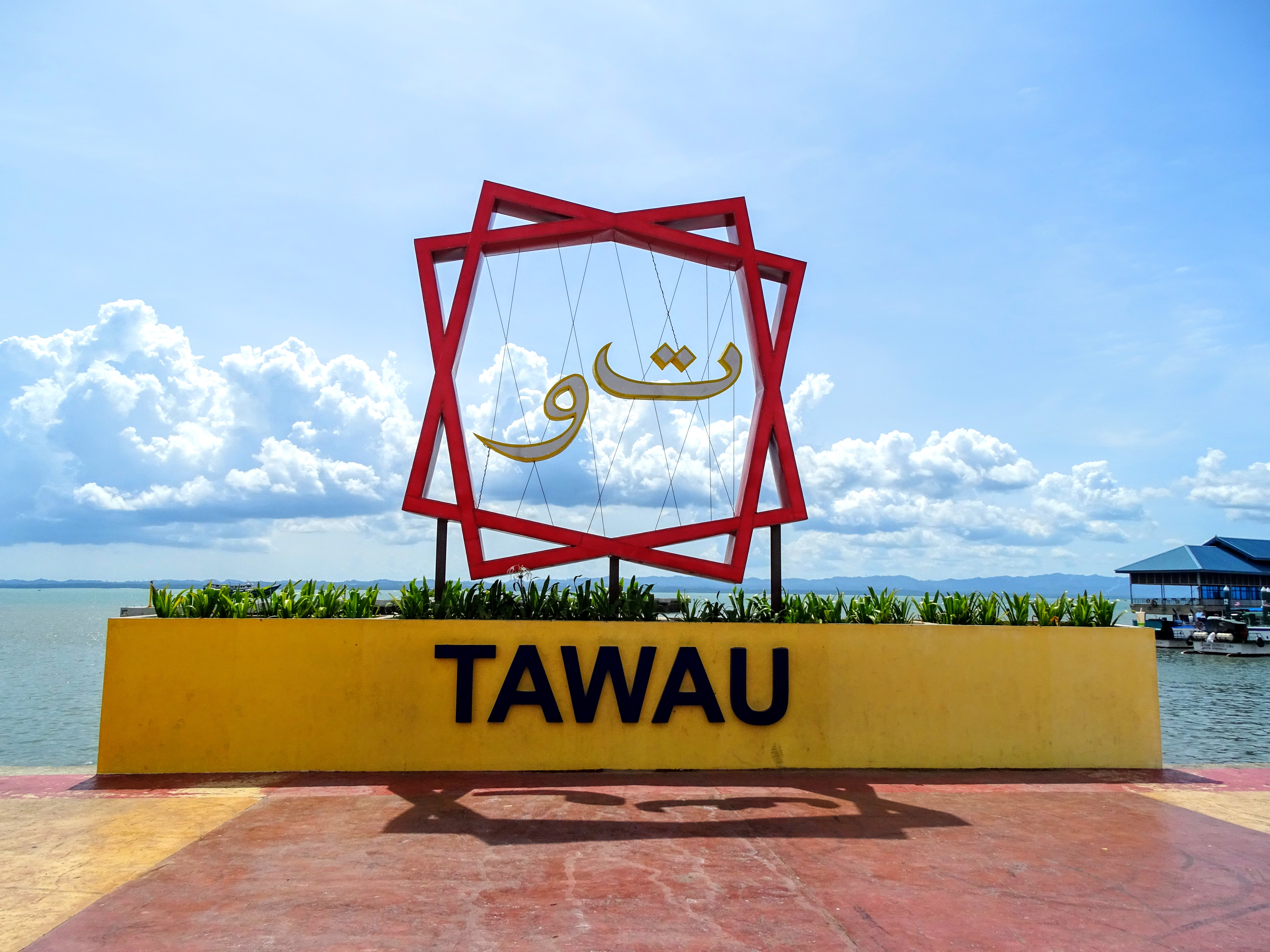
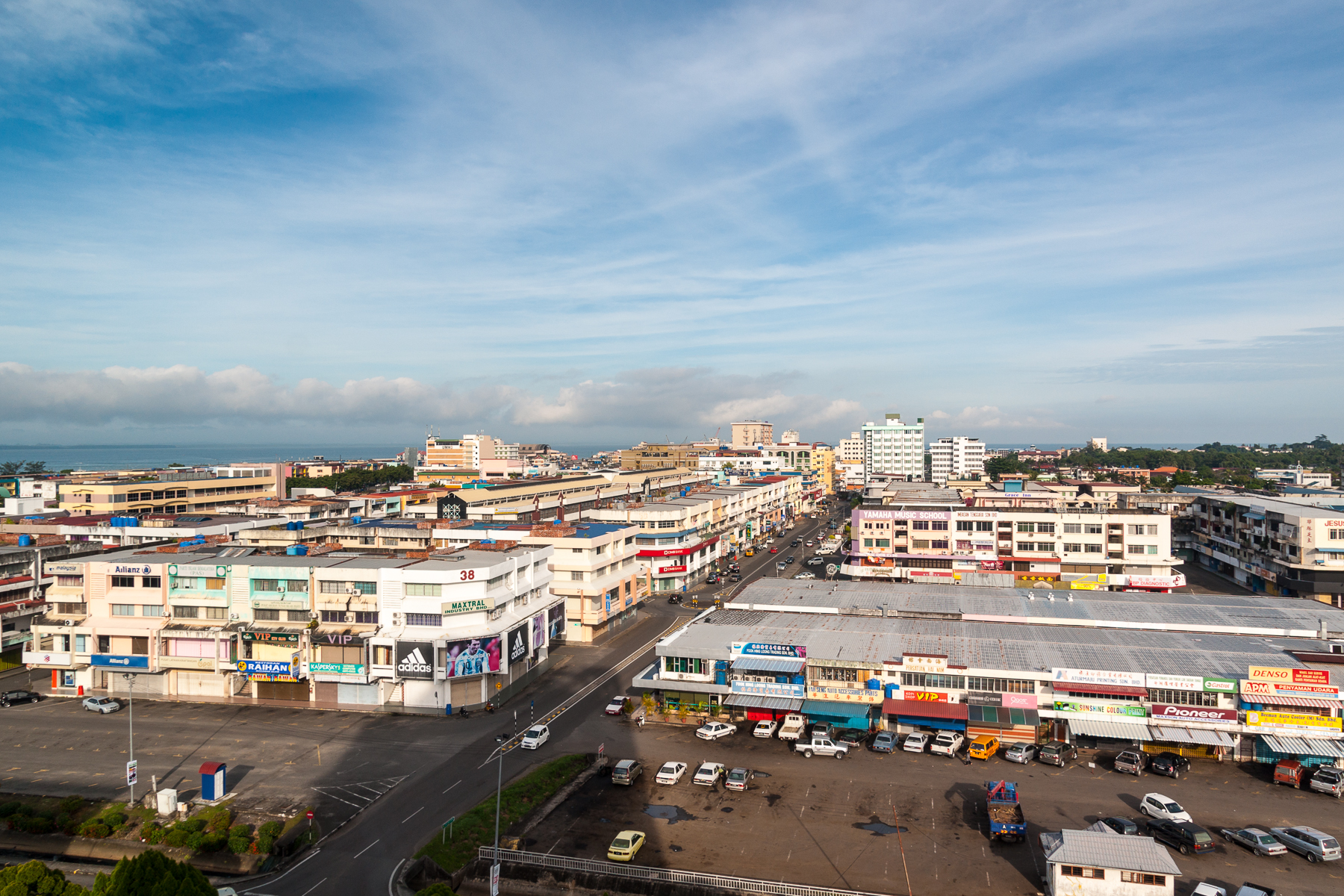
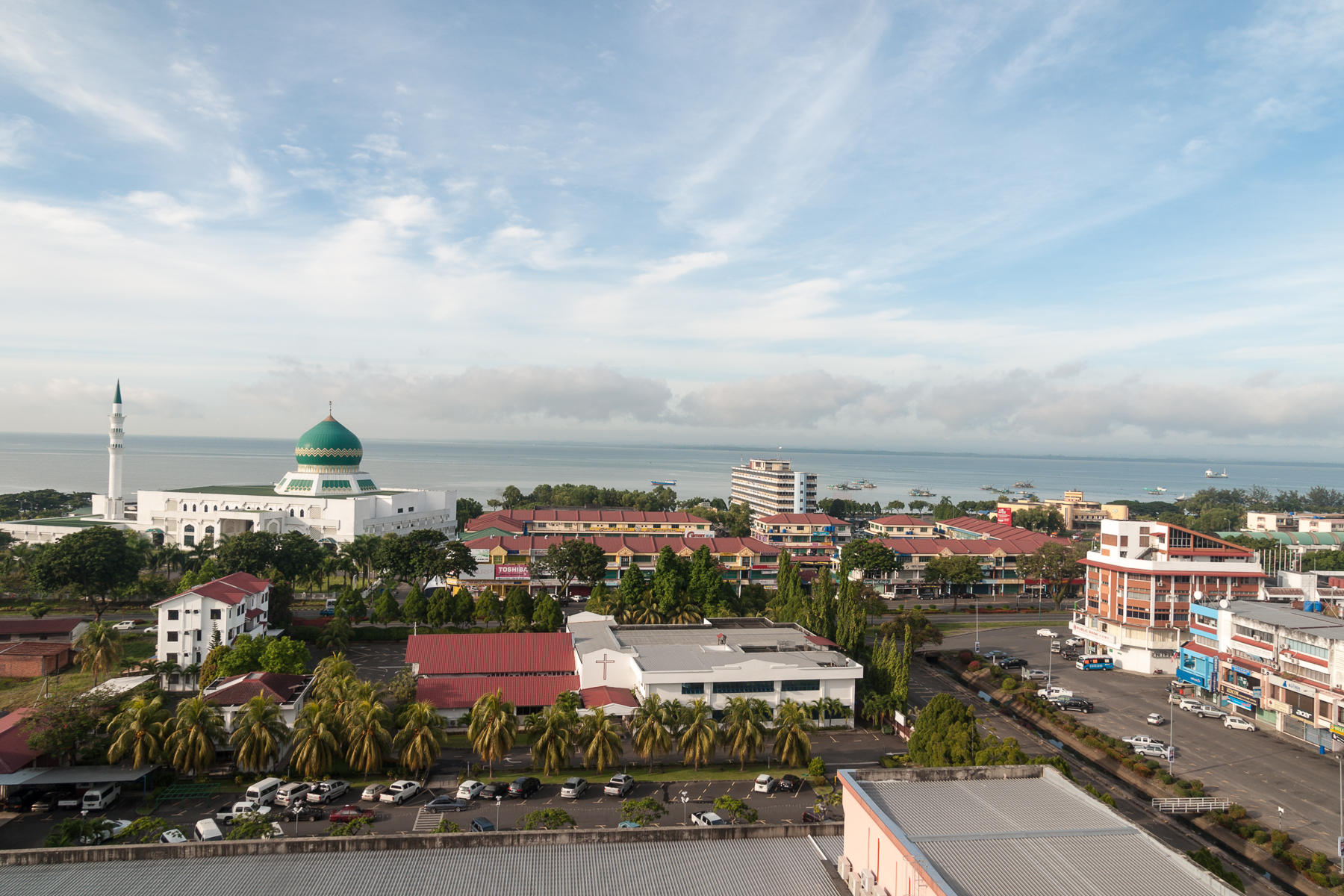
- From top, left to right: City sign, aerial view towards the town centre, and aerial view towards Cowie Bay

- Seal
- Motto: Bumi Peladang
- Location of Tawau in Sabah
- Tawau in Sabah Tawau in Malaysia Tawau (Asia) Tawau (Earth)
- Coordinates: 04°15′30″N 117°53′40″E
- Country: Malaysia
- State: Sabah
- Division: Tawau
- District: Tawau
- Bruneian Empire: 15th century–1658
- Sultanate of Sulu: 1658–1882
- Sultanate of Bulungan: 1750
- Founded: 1893
- Settled by North Borneo Chartered Company: 1898
- Municipality: 1 January 1982

Government
  - Council President: Pang Pick Lim Joseph

Area
  - Town: 55.9 km^{2} (21.6 sq mi)
  - Municipality: 2,240 km^{2} (860 sq mi)
- Elevation: 8 m (26 ft)

Population (2020 Census)
  - Municipality: 372,615
- Time zone: UTC+8 (MST)
  - Summer (DST): Not observed
- Postal code: 91000
- Area code(s): 089
- Vehicle registration: ET (1967-1980), ST (1980-2018), SW (2019-Present)
- Website: mpt.sabah.gov.my

Tawau (Malaysian: [ˈta wau]) is the capital of the Tawau District in Sabah, Malaysia. It is the third-largest city (or town) (Note: While Tawau have a population of more than 100,000 of which is considered city elsewhere in the world it is officially referred as "bandar" (town) in Malay language due to Malaysian law have multiple criteria for a town to be considered a city including a population of more than 500,000 (such as George Town, Penang), administrative centre of a state (such as Kuching, a state capital of Sarawak despite its smaller 300,000 population) and income of RM100 million.) in Sabah, after Kota Kinabalu and Sandakan. It is located on the Semporna Peninsula in the southeast coast of the state in the administrative centre of Tawau Division, which is bordered by the Sulu Sea to the east, the Celebes Sea to the south at Cowie Bay (Note: Cowie Bay in the early 19th century was known as Kalabakong Bay. It is also known as Sibuco Bay.) and shares a border with North Kalimantan, Indonesia. The town had an estimated population as of 2010, of 113,809, while the whole municipality area had a population of 397,673 (including 47,466 in Kalabakan, subsequently split off to form a separate district). (Note: Above the official figures of the 2010 Census, there are a large number of illegal immigrants from Indonesia and the Philippines.(Goodlet, page 248 and page 299)) The municipal area had a population of 372,615 at the 2020 Census.

Before the founding of Tawau, the region around it was the subject of dispute between the British and Dutch spheres of influence. In 1893, the first British merchant vessel sailed into Tawau, marking the opening of the town's seaport. In 1898, the British set up a settlement in Tawau. The North Borneo Chartered Company (NBCC) accelerated growth of the settlement's population by encouraging the immigration of Chinese. Consequent to the Japanese occupation of North Borneo, the Allied forces bombed the town in mid-1944, razing it to the ground. After the Japanese surrender in 1945, 2,900 Japanese soldiers in Tawau became prisoners of war and were transferred to Jesselton. Tawau was rebuilt after the war, and by the end of 1947, the economy was restored to its pre-war status. Tawau was also the main point of conflict during the Indonesia–Malaysia confrontation from 1963 to 1966. During that period, it was garrisoned by the British Special Boat Section, and guarded by Australian Destroyers and combat aircraft. In December 1963, Tawau was bombed twice by Indonesia and shootings occurred across the Tawau-Sebatik Island international border. Indonesians were found trying to poison the town's water supply. In January 1965, a curfew was imposed to prevent Indonesian attackers from making contact with Indonesians living in the town. While in June 1965, another attempted invasion by the Indonesian forces was repelled by bombardment by an Australian destroyer. Military conflict finally ended in December 1966.

Among the tourist attractions in Tawau are: the Tawau International Cultural Festival, Tawau Bell Tower, Japanese War Cemetery, Confrontation Memorial, Teck Guan Cocoa Museum, Tawau Hills National Park, Bukit Gemok, and Tawau Tanjung Markets. The main economic activities of the town are: timber, cocoa, oil palm plantations, and prawn farming.

== History ==
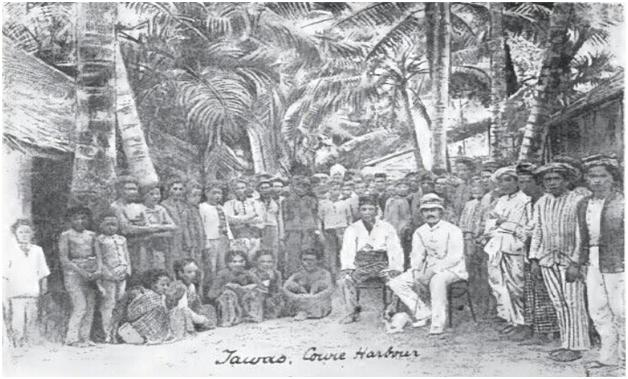
Tawau residents and their community chief with Alexander Rankin Dunlop (sitting right) in the Cowie Harbour of Tawau, circa 1885.

Like most of this part of Borneo, this area was once under the control of the Bruneian Empire in the 15th century before being ceded to the Sultanate of Sulu between the 17th and 18th centuries as a gift for helping the Bruneian forces during a civil war in Brunei. The name Tawao was used on nautical charts by 1857, and there is evidence of a settlement by 1879. The East India Company had established a trading post in Borneo, though there was no significant activity by the Dutch on the east coast. In 1846, Netherlands signed a treaty with the Sultan of Bulungan, where the latter assured the Dutch control of the area. When the Dutch began to operate in 1867, the Sultan married his son to the daughter of the Sultan of Tarakan. Around this time, the Dutch sphere of influence reached Tawao. They controlled the area north of Tawao, overlapping an area controlled by the Sultan of Sulu.

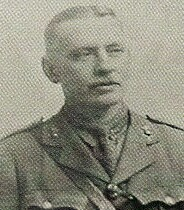
Alexander R. Dunlop is the first British resident of Tawau.

In 1878, Sultanate of Sulu sold the southern part of his land bounded by the Sibuco River to an Austro-Hungarian consul Baron von Overbeck, who later tried to sell the territory to the German Empire, Austria-Hungary and the Kingdom of Italy for use as a penal colony but failed, leaving Alfred Dent to manage and establish the North Borneo Provisional Association Ltd. The Provisional Association negotiated in the 1880s with the Dutch for a definition of a boundary between the area conferred by the Sultan of Sulu and the area that the Dutch claimed from Sultan of Bulungan to settle a dispute that arose from the unknown exact location of the real border between the territory that was held by the Sultanate of Sulu and the Sultanate of Bulungan. Alexander Rankin Dunlop became the first Resident for the settlement of Tawau. On 20 January 1891, a final agreement was reached on a line along 4° 10' north latitude – on the central division of the Sebatik Island. (Note: The final contractual limit was indeed confirmed in 1912 by the joint boundary commission, and on 17 February 1913 by Dutch and British negotiators.) In the early 1890s, approximately 200 people lived in the Tawao settlement, mostly immigrants from Bulungan in Kalimantan, and some from Tawi-Tawi who had fled from Dutch and Spanish rule. The settlement was renamed from Tawao to Tawau. Most of those who fled from the Dutch colonisation continued trading with the Dutch. In 1893, a British vessel S.S. Normanhurst sailed into Tawau with a cargo to trade. In 1898, the British built a settlement which later grew rapidly when the North Borneo Chartered Company (NBCC) sponsored the migration of Chinese to Tawau.

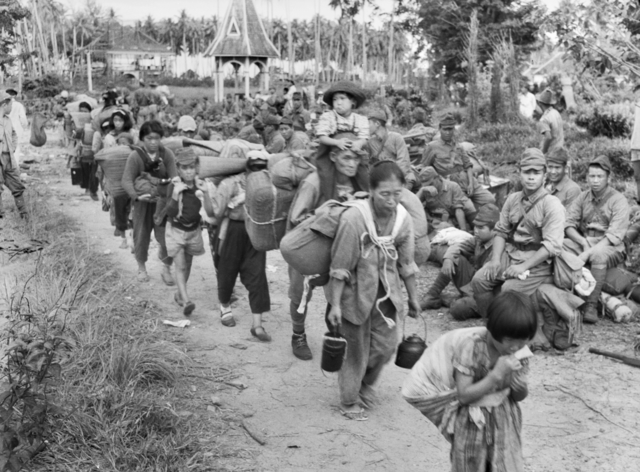
Japanese civilians and soldiers prior to their embarkation to Jesselton, the bell tower can be seen behind.

On 16 December 1941, during World War II, the Japanese invasion of Borneo began. After the first landing in Miri, the Japanese moved along the coastline of Borneo from the oil fields of Kuching and towards Jesselton. Life in Tawau continued as usual until 24 January 1942 when the Japanese were sighted off Batu Tinagat. The district officer Cole Adams and his assistant were expecting an attack at the shipyard but were instead arrested by the Japanese. (Note: Cole Adams spent 44 months in Japanese POW camps – first on the Berhala Island in Sandakan, later in Batu Lintang camp near Kuching – and died on the day of his liberation by the 9th Division of the Australian armed forces in September 1945.) The Allies began counterattacking the Japanese in mid-1944 with the bombing of Tawau. From 13 April 1945, six massive air strikes were made on town, concentrating on the port facilities. The last and largest of these attacks was on 1 May 1945 when 19 Liberator bombers bombed Tawau until it was completely razed to the ground. After an unconditional surrender of the 37th Japanese Army under Lieutenant General Masao Baba in mid-September at Labuan, 1,100 Australian soldiers in Sandakan under the command of Lt. Col. JA England marched into the Japanese bases at Tawau. A total of 2,900 Japanese soldiers of the 370th battalion under Major Sugasaki Moriyuki were taken as prisoners of war and transferred to Jesselton.

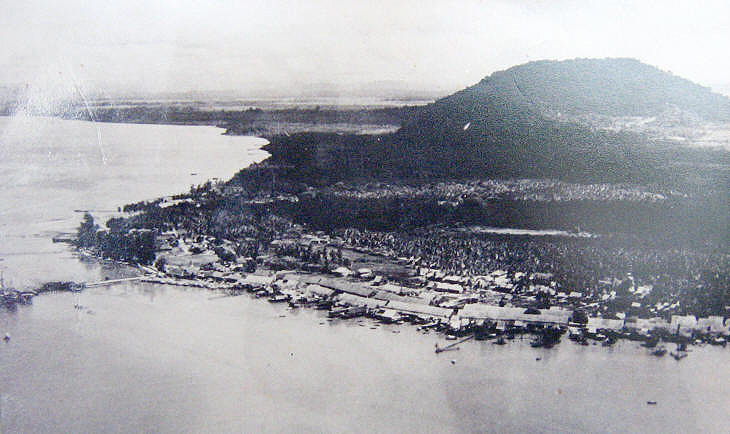
An aerial view of Tawau town in 1947.

At the end of the war, the town had been largely destroyed by bombing and fire; the Bell tower was the only intact pre-war structure. Tawau quickly recovered. Though almost all the shops were destroyed, a report by The British North Borneo Annual Report in 1947 wrote that "the pre-war economy was largely made towards the end of 1947". In the first six months post-war, the British rebuilt 170 shops and commercial buildings. By 1 July 1947, subsidies for the purchase of rice and flour were introduced.

=== Indonesian confrontation ===
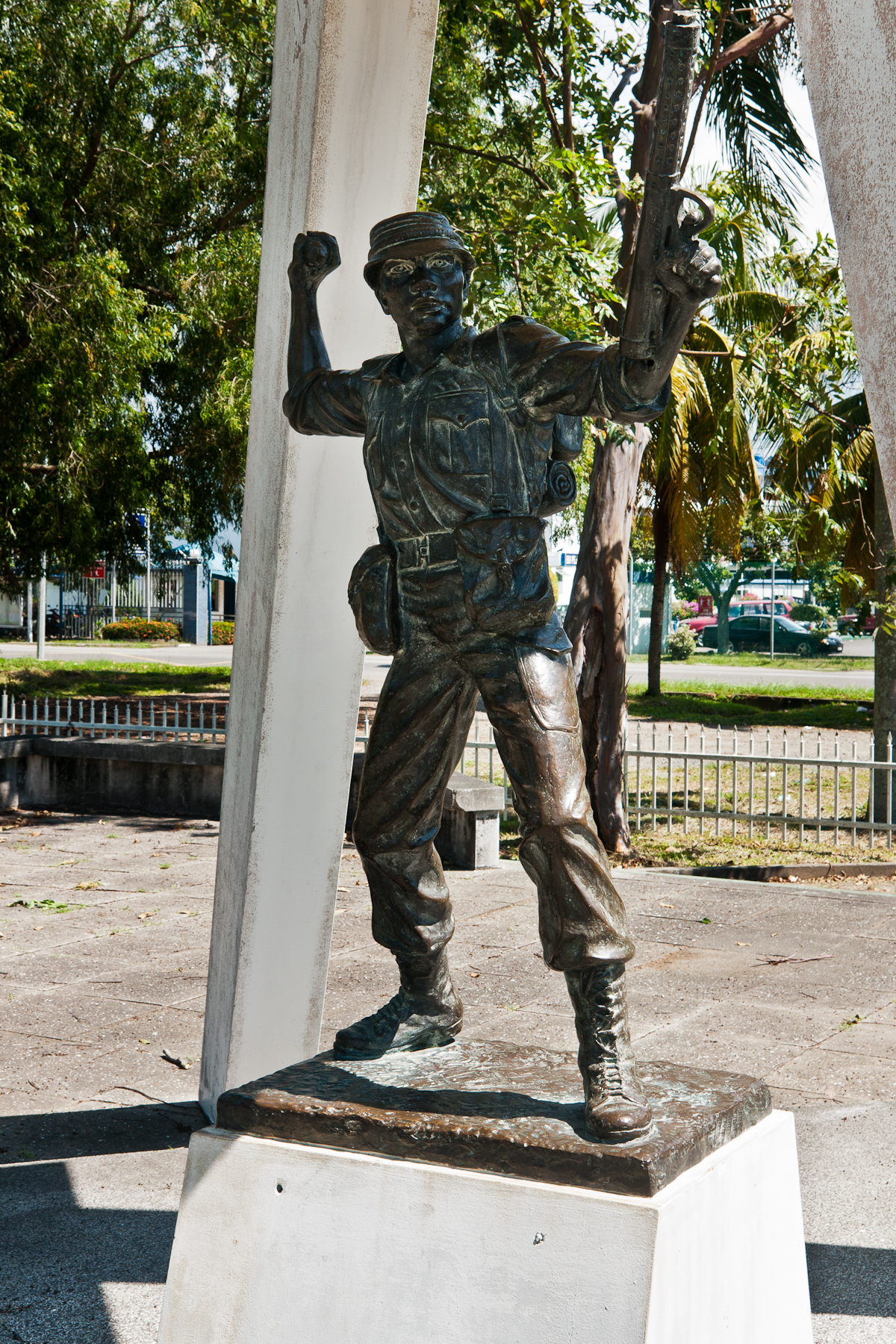
The Tawau Konfrontasi Memorial.

Due to its exposed location near the international border with Indonesia, Tawau became the main point of the conflict during the confrontation. In preparation for the impending conflict, Gurkhas were stationed in the town with other units including the "British No. 2 Special Boat Section" under Captain DW Mitchell. Australian River-class destroyer escorts were stationed in Cowie Bay and a squadron of F-86 Sabre aircraft flew over Tawau daily from Labuan.

In October 1963, Indonesia moved their first battalion of the Korps Komando Operasi (KKO) from Surabaya to Sebatik and opened several training camps near the border in eastern Kalimantan (now North Kalimantan). From 1 October to 16 December 1963, there were at least seven shootings along the border resulting in three Indonesians' deaths. On 7 December 1963, an Indonesian Tupolev Tu-16 bomber flew over Tawau bay and bombed the town twice.

By mid-December 1963, Indonesian had sent a commando unit consisting of 128 volunteers and 35 regular soldiers to Sebatik. Their aim was to take Kalabakan, then invade Tawau and Sandakan. On 29 December 1963, the Indonesian unit attacked the 3rd Royal Malay Regiment unit. The Indonesians managed to throw several grenades into the totally unprepared Malay Regiment's sleeping quarters. The attack resulted in eight Malay soldiers being killed and nineteen wounded. Malaysian armed police eventually drove the attackers north after a two-hour battle.

In 1964, the situation remained tense in Tawau. A group of eight Indonesians were detained while trying to poison the water supply of the town. On 12 May 1964, there was a bombing attempt on the Kong Fah cinema. At the end of January 1965, a night time curfew was imposed in Tawau to prevent attackers from contacting the approximate 16,000 Indonesians living there. By the end of February 1965, 96 of the 128 Indonesian volunteers had been killed or captured, around 20 successfully retreated to Indonesia, and 12 remained at large. On 28 June 1965, an attempt by Indonesian troops to invade eastern Sebatik was repelled by a heavy bombardment by Australian destroyer HMAS Yarra. In August 1965, an unknown assailant made an attempt to blow up a high-tension electricity pylon while in September 1965, a logging truck was destroyed by a land mine. The confrontation largely ended 12 August 1966, and in December there was a complete ceasefire in Tawau.

== Government and international relations ==
Indonesia has a consulate in Tawau and the town has twin town arrangements with Zhangping, China and Pare-Pare, Indonesia.

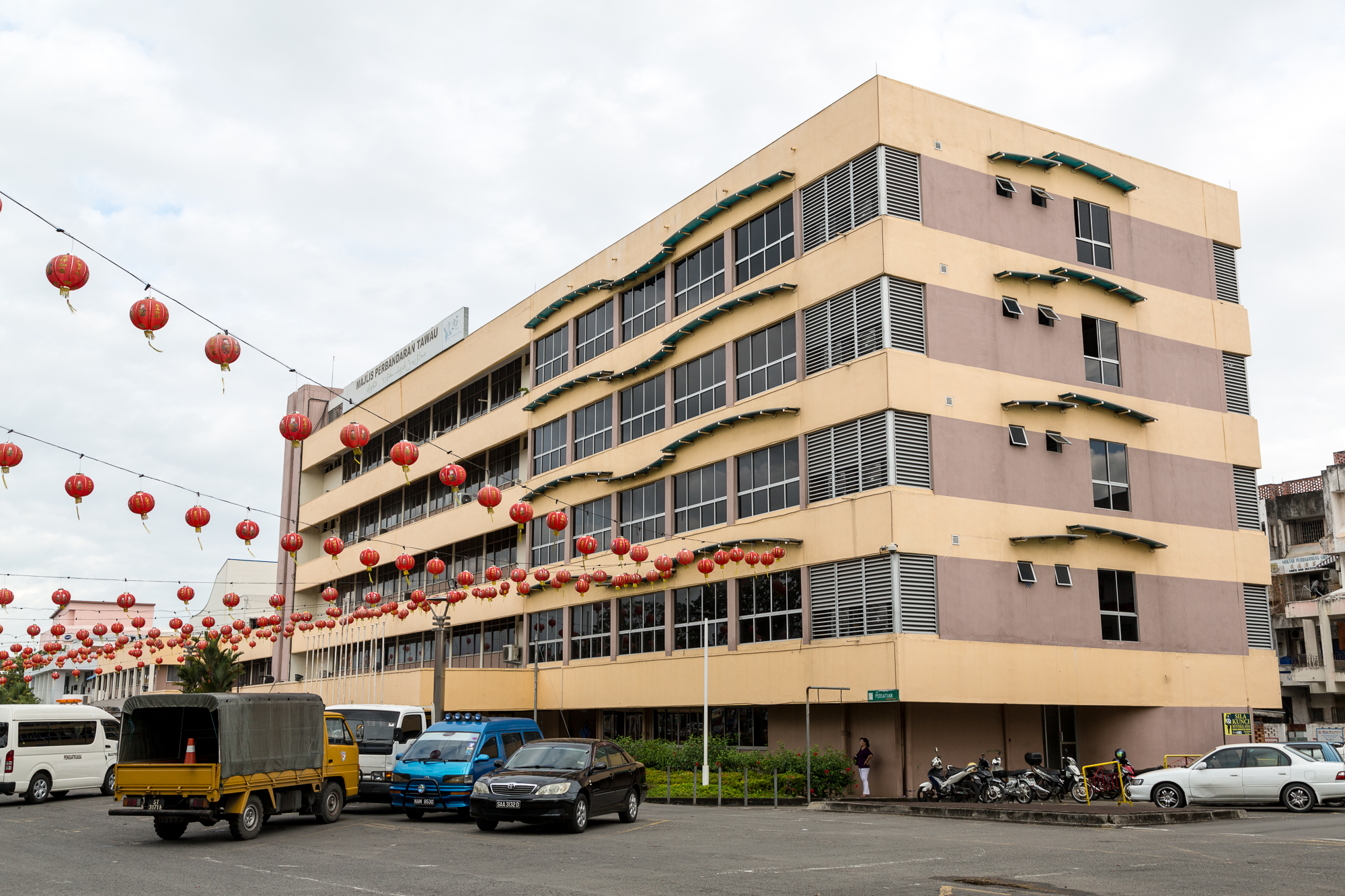
Tawau Municipal Council building.

There are two members of parliament (MPs) representing the two parliamentary constituencies in the district: Tawau (P.190) and Kalabakan (P.191). The area is represented by six members of the Sabah State Legislative Assembly representing the districts of: Balung; Apas; Sri Tanjung; Merotai; Tanjung Batu; and Sebatik.

The town is administered by the Tawau Municipal Council (Majlis Perbandaran Tawau). As of 2021, the President of Tawau Municipal Council is Pang Pick Lim or also known as Joseph Pang. The area under the jurisdiction of the Tawau District is the 2,510-hectare (25.1 km^{2}) town area, 3,075-hectare (30.75 km^{2}) surrounding populated area, 568,515 hectares (5,685.15 km^{2}) of rural land and 38,406 hectares (384.06 km^{2}) of adjacent sea area.

=== Security ===
Today, Tawau is one of the six districts involved in the eastern Sabah sea curfew that has been enforced since 19 July 2014 by the Malaysian government to repel attacks from militant groups in southern Philippines.

== Geography ==
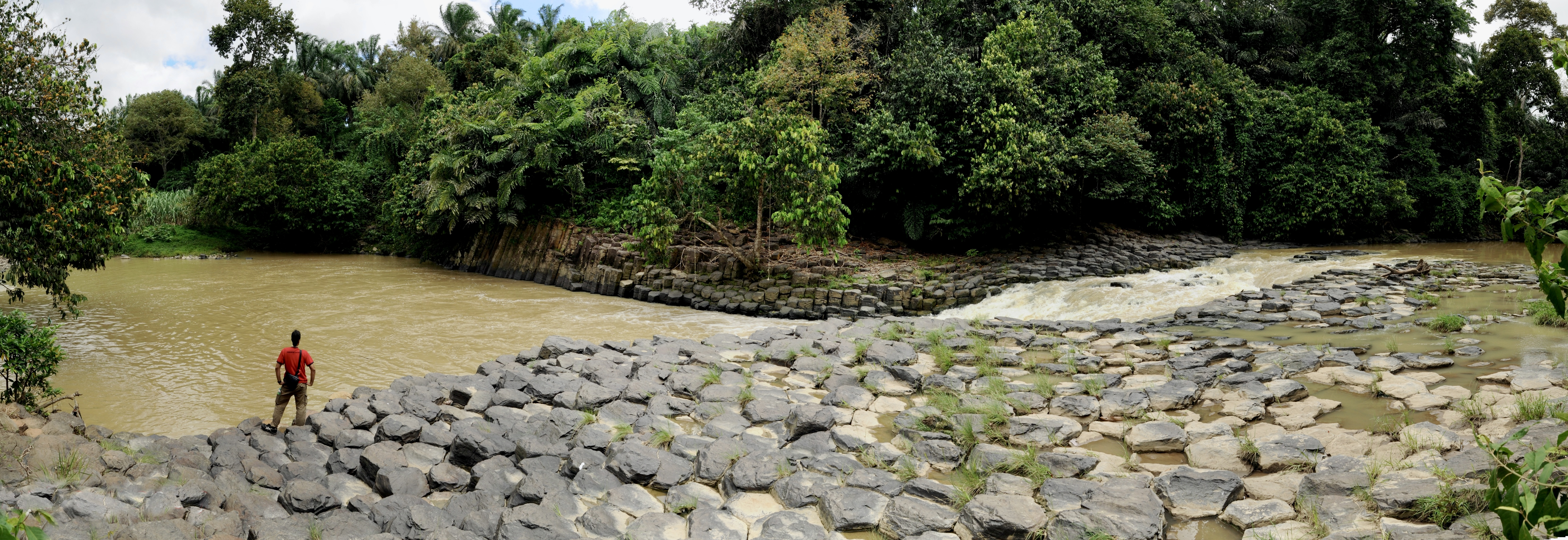
Basalt columns formed by volcanic lava in Kampung Balung Cocos

Tawau is on the south-east coast of Sabah surround by the Sulu Sea in the east, Celebes Sea to the south and shares a border with East Kalimantan (now North Kalimantan). The town is approximately 1,904 kilometres from the Malaysian capital, Kuala Lumpur and is 540 kilometres south-east of Kota Kinabalu. The main town area is divided into three sections named Sabindo, Fajar and Tawau Lama (Old Tawau). Sabindo and Fajar are the main commercial areas while Tawau Lama is the original part of Tawau.

Almost 70% of the area surrounding Tawau is either high hills or mountainous. Among the major peaks surrounding the Tawau includes Mount Maria (1,067 metres), Mount Magdalena (1,310 metres) and Mount Lucia (1,201 metres).

The town is bordered by Cowie Bay towards the south. The bay is recorded as a home for several species of dolphin, including Indo-Pacific humpback dolphin and Irrawaddy dolphin.

The only volcano in Malaysia is located in Tawau. The Bombalai Volcano contains a 300-meter crater that straddles to the south.

=== Climate ===
Tawau has a tropical rainforest climate under the Köppen climate classification. The climate is relatively hot and wet with average shade temperature about 26 °C (79 °F), with 29 °C (84 °F) at noon and falling to around 23 °C (73 °F) at night. The town sees precipitation throughout the year, with a tendency for November, December and January to be the wettest months, while February and March are the driest months. Tawau's mean rainfall varies from 1800 mm to 2500 mm.

Climate data for Tawau (1991–2020 normals)
Month	Jan	Feb	Mar	Apr	May	Jun	Jul	Aug	Sep	Oct	Nov	Dec	Year
Record high °C (°F)	34.4 (93.9)	35.1 (95.2)	35.5 (95.9)	35.2 (95.4)	35.2 (95.4)	34.4 (93.9)	33.6 (92.5)	33.9 (93.0)	34.4 (93.9)	34.5 (94.1)	34.8 (94.6)	35.4 (95.7)	35.5 (95.9)
Mean daily maximum °C (°F)	31.1 (88.0)	31.5 (88.7)	31.8 (89.2)	31.9 (89.4)	31.8 (89.2)	31.4 (88.5)	31.1 (88.0)	31.2 (88.2)	31.5 (88.7)	31.7 (89.1)	31.7 (89.1)	31.3 (88.3)	31.5 (88.7)
Daily mean °C (°F)	26.4 (79.5)	26.6 (79.9)	26.9 (80.4)	27.2 (81.0)	27.3 (81.1)	26.9 (80.4)	26.7 (80.1)	26.8 (80.2)	26.9 (80.4)	26.8 (80.2)	26.8 (80.2)	26.6 (79.9)	26.8 (80.2)
Mean daily minimum °C (°F)	23.1 (73.6)	23.1 (73.6)	23.3 (73.9)	23.7 (74.7)	23.9 (75.0)	23.6 (74.5)	23.3 (73.9)	23.3 (73.9)	23.3 (73.9)	23.4 (74.1)	23.5 (74.3)	23.4 (74.1)	23.4 (74.1)
Record low °C (°F)	18.2 (64.8)	18.7 (65.7)	20.2 (68.4)	21.8 (71.2)	20.6 (69.1)	20.9 (69.6)	21.0 (69.8)	21.0 (69.8)	21.2 (70.2)	19.9 (67.8)	21.2 (70.2)	18.2 (64.8)	18.2 (64.8)
Average precipitation mm (inches)	143.2 (5.64)	106.0 (4.17)	126.6 (4.98)	123.4 (4.86)	164.0 (6.46)	174.9 (6.89)	192.1 (7.56)	209.6 (8.25)	135.4 (5.33)	169.8 (6.69)	172.1 (6.78)	213.5 (8.41)	1,930.6 (76.01)
Average precipitation days (≥ 1.0 mm)	11.3	9.0	10.3	9.4	11.5	12.4	12.5	11.4	10.4	12.7	13.2	14.8	138.9
Mean monthly sunshine hours	182.5	183.8	216.5	222.6	231.1	191.6	216.2	218.9	198.3	198.1	193.3	194.0	2,446.9
Source 1: World Meteorological Organization
Source 2: NOAA

== Demography ==
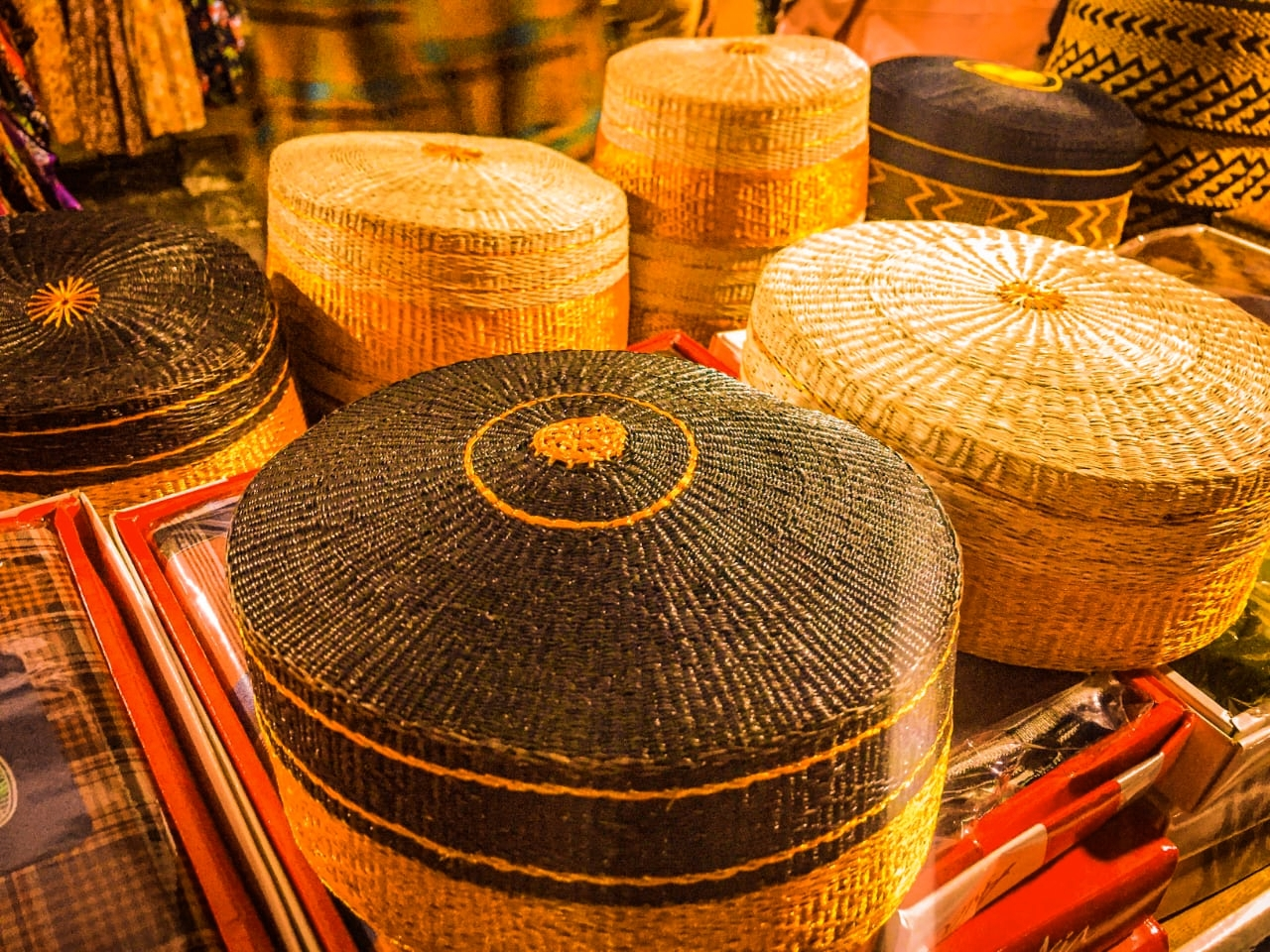
Traditional Bugis-headgear (Songkok Recca) in Tawau. The Bugis in Sabah predominantly concentrated in the eastern corridor of the state, with its main population centre located in Tawau

The demographic landscape of Tawau, as highlighted in the Malaysian Census 2010 Report, portrays a rich tapestry of cultures and ethnicities. Initially boasting a population of 397,673, with a subsequent adjustment excluding 57,466 individuals in the Kalabakan District, the municipality is a bustling port town situated in Malaysian Borneo. Its proximity to Indonesia and the Philippines has significantly influenced its demographic makeup, setting it apart from other areas in Sabah.

The population of Tawau is notably diverse, resembling major urban centres in the eastern coast of Kalimantan, such as Tarakan, Samarinda, and Balikpapan. The census reveals a melting pot of races and ethnicities, characterised by intermarriages among various groups and nationalities.

=== Nationality ===
Non-Malaysian citizens constitute a majority in the town, numbering at 164,729 individuals. The non-Malaysian populace predominantly hails from Indonesia and the Philippines, originating from Sulawesi, Kalimantan, the Sulu Archipelago, Mindanao, and the Visayas. Additionally, a small Pakistani community, primarily engaged in business ventures. Many non-citizen residents work and reside in plantations, with some having obtained Malaysian citizenship through naturalisation. However, a significant portion continues to live without proper documentation, residing in illegal settlements within the town.

=== Ethnicities ===
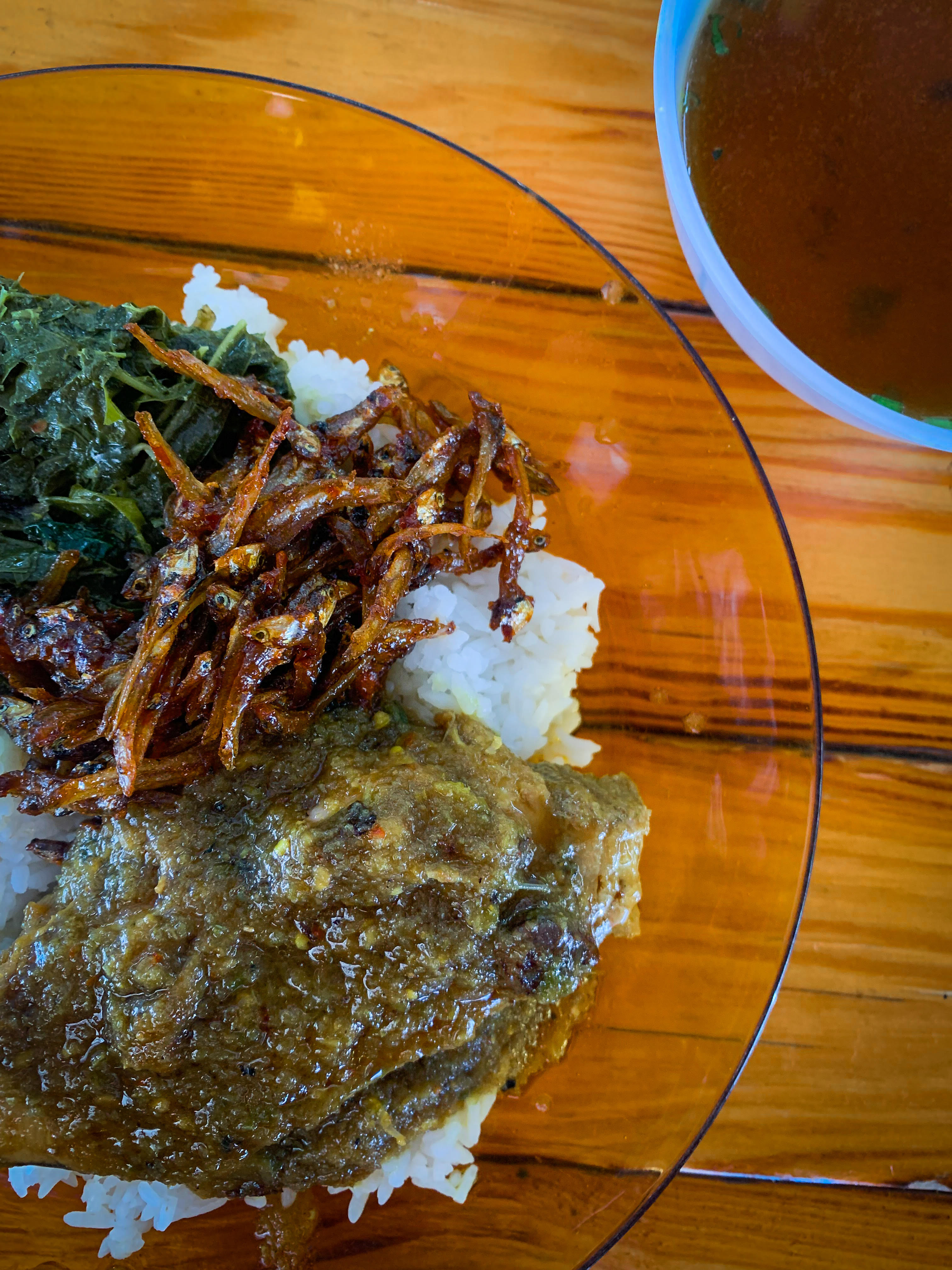
A plate of Nasi Bambong, a type of nasi campur from Tawau; the term bambong denotes 'unemployed' in the local Malay dialect, reflecting its origin as a simple, affordable meal

Among Malaysian citizens, Bumiputras represent a significant portion, including Bugis, Bajau, Banjar, Javanese, Suluk, Tidung, Bulungan, alongside smaller communities of Kadazan-Dusun, Murut, Lun Bawang/Lundayeh, Bruneian Malays, Cocos Malays, Kedayan, Peninsula Malays, Indians, Iban and other smaller Bumiputera groups. The Bugis community formed as the largest ethnolinguistic group in Tawau.

In Tawau, the Malaysian Chinese community shares a historical narrative akin to their counterparts in other regions of Sabah. These are predominantly Hakkas, and their migration traces back to the British colonial era, settling originally in agricultural zones around Apas Road. Notably, intermarriages between Chinese and Kadazan-Dusun Muruts have fostered a distinctive Sino-Native community. Additionally, marriages between Chinese individuals and Torajans from Indonesia, as well as Filipinos, are prevalent. Beyond the Sabahan Chinese, Tawau also attracts Chinese immigrants from Peninsula Malaysia, Sarawak, Indonesia and the Philippines.

=== Religion ===
Religiously, most Bumiputera populations in Tawau are Muslims, with exceptions among the Kadazan-Dusuns, Lundayeh, and Muruts who mainly practice Christianity. Malaysian Chinese are predominantly Buddhists, with some practising Taoism or Christianity. Other religious groups, including Hindus, Sikhs, Animists, and secularists, also coexist within the town.

The majority of non-citizen inhabitants in Tawau adhere to Islam, with a significant minority belonging to the Christian faith. Among the Christian community, a sizeable proportion originates from Indonesia, mainly comprising ethnic Toraja, Florenese, Timorese, Chinese Indonesians, Dayaks Indonesian, and Filipinos of Visayan and Zamboangueño descent.

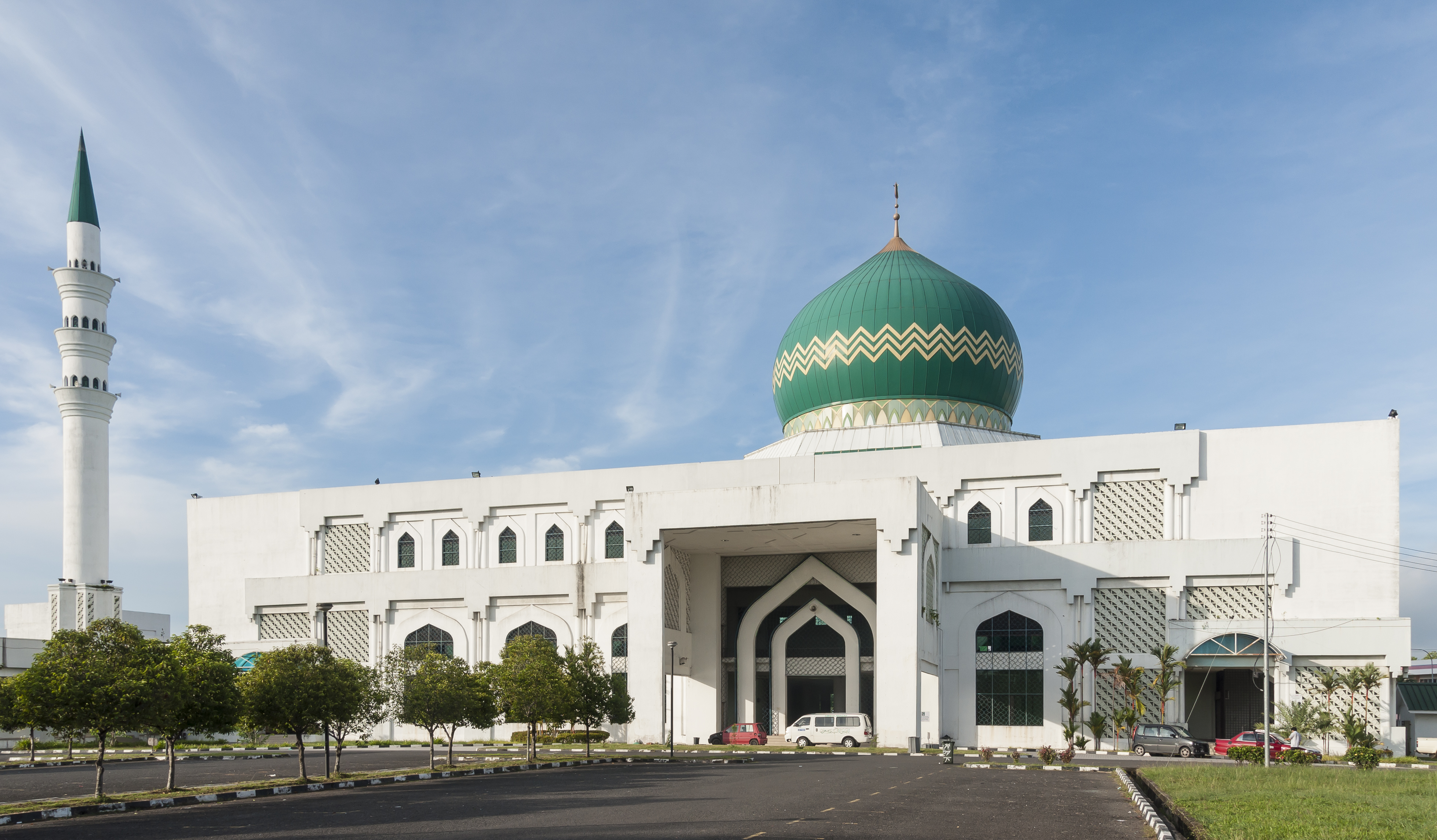
Al-Kauthar Mosque, the largest mosque in Sabah.

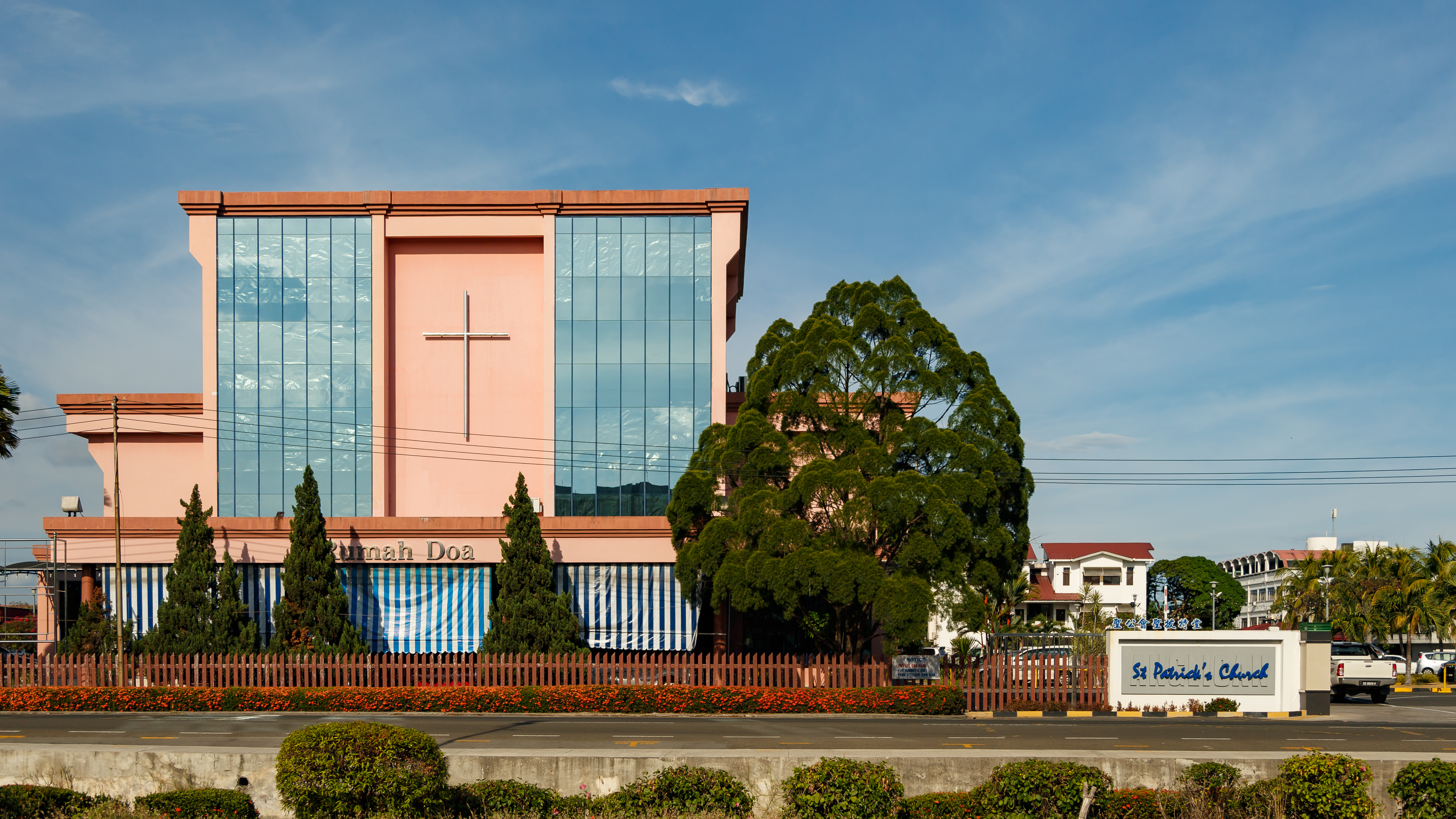
St. Patrick's, the Anglican Church of Tawau

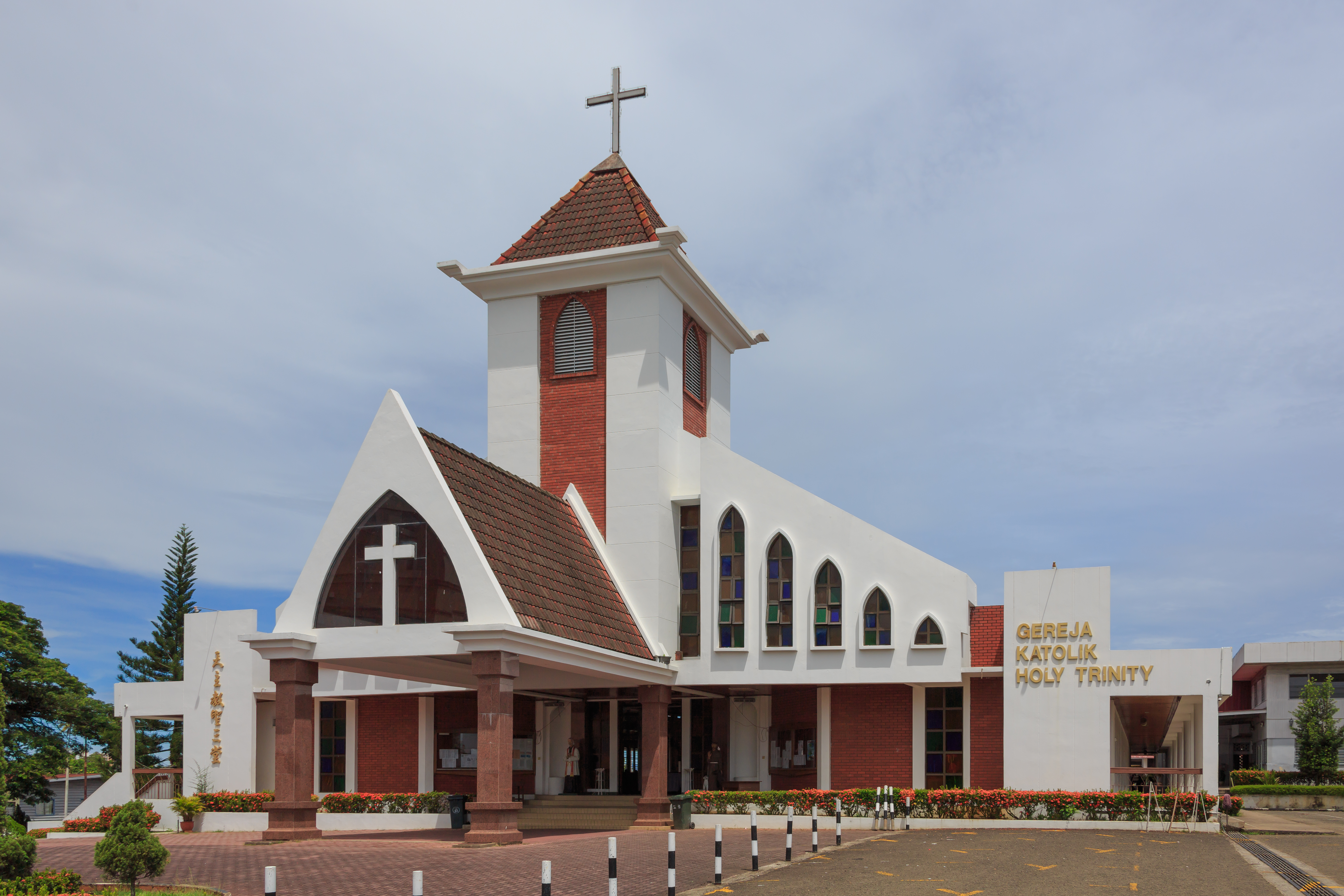
The Holy Trinity Church, a Catholic church in Tawau.

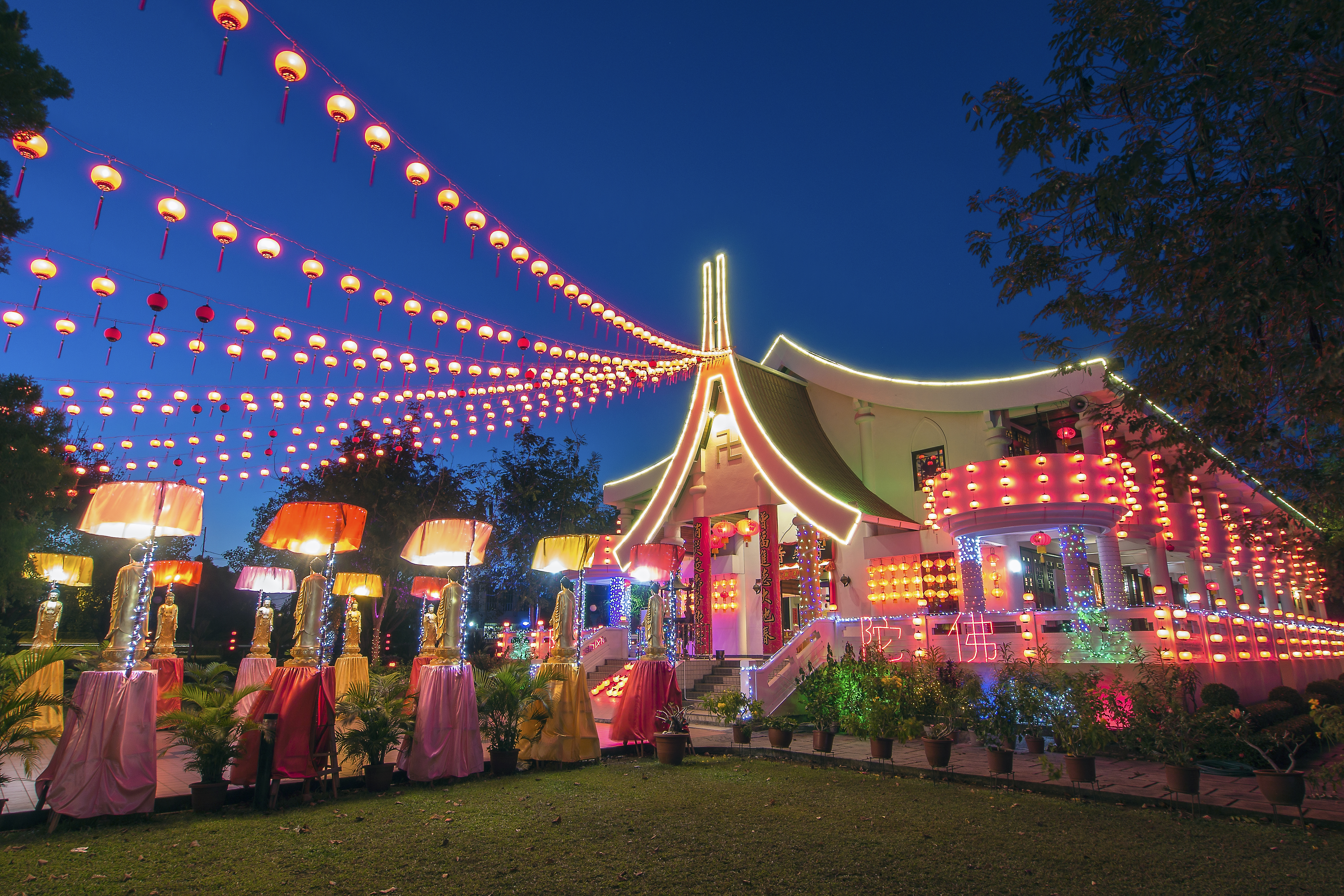
Pu Zhao Temple, a Buddhist lodge temple in Tawau.

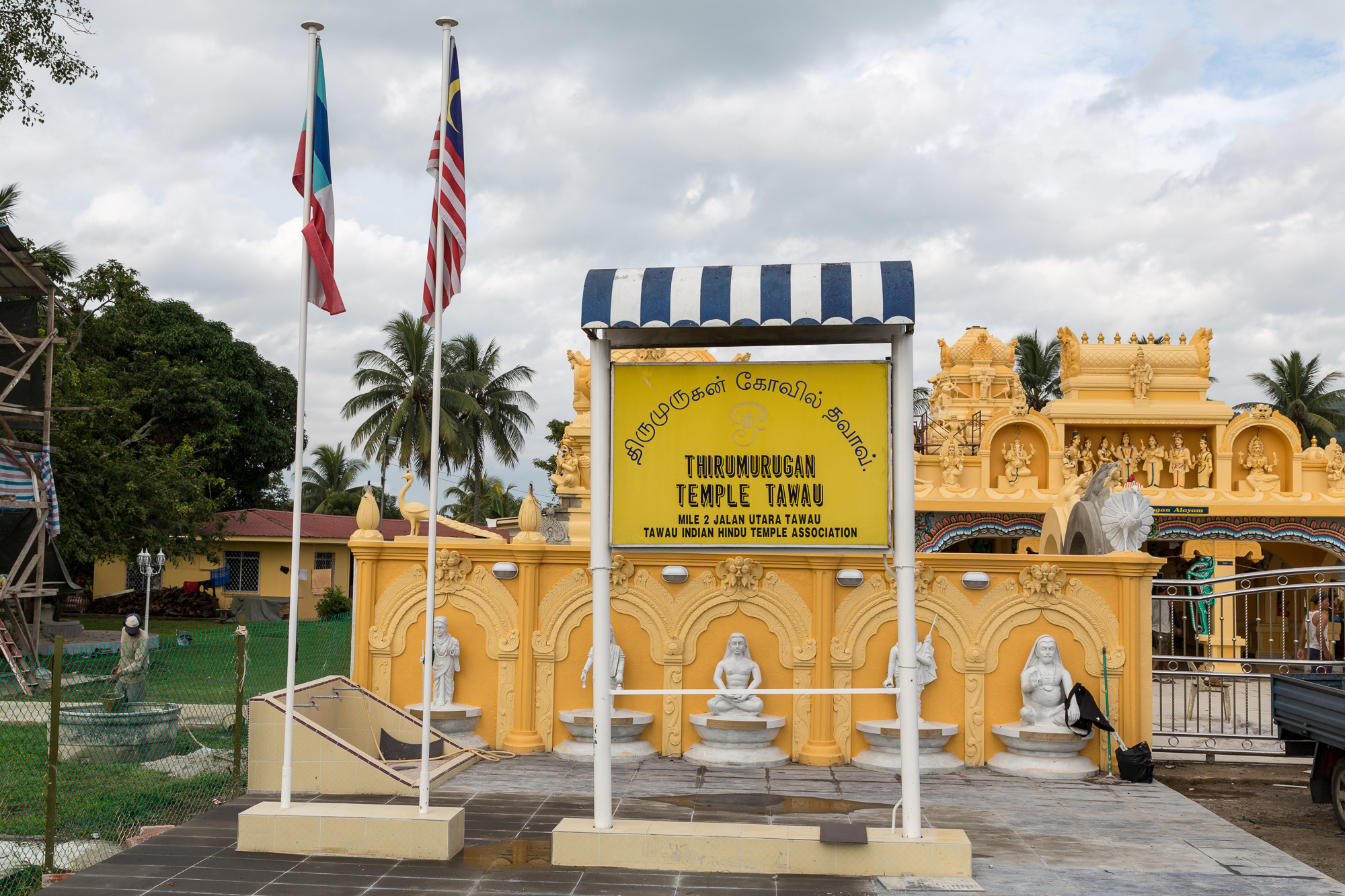
Thirumurugan Temple, a Hindu temple in Tawau.

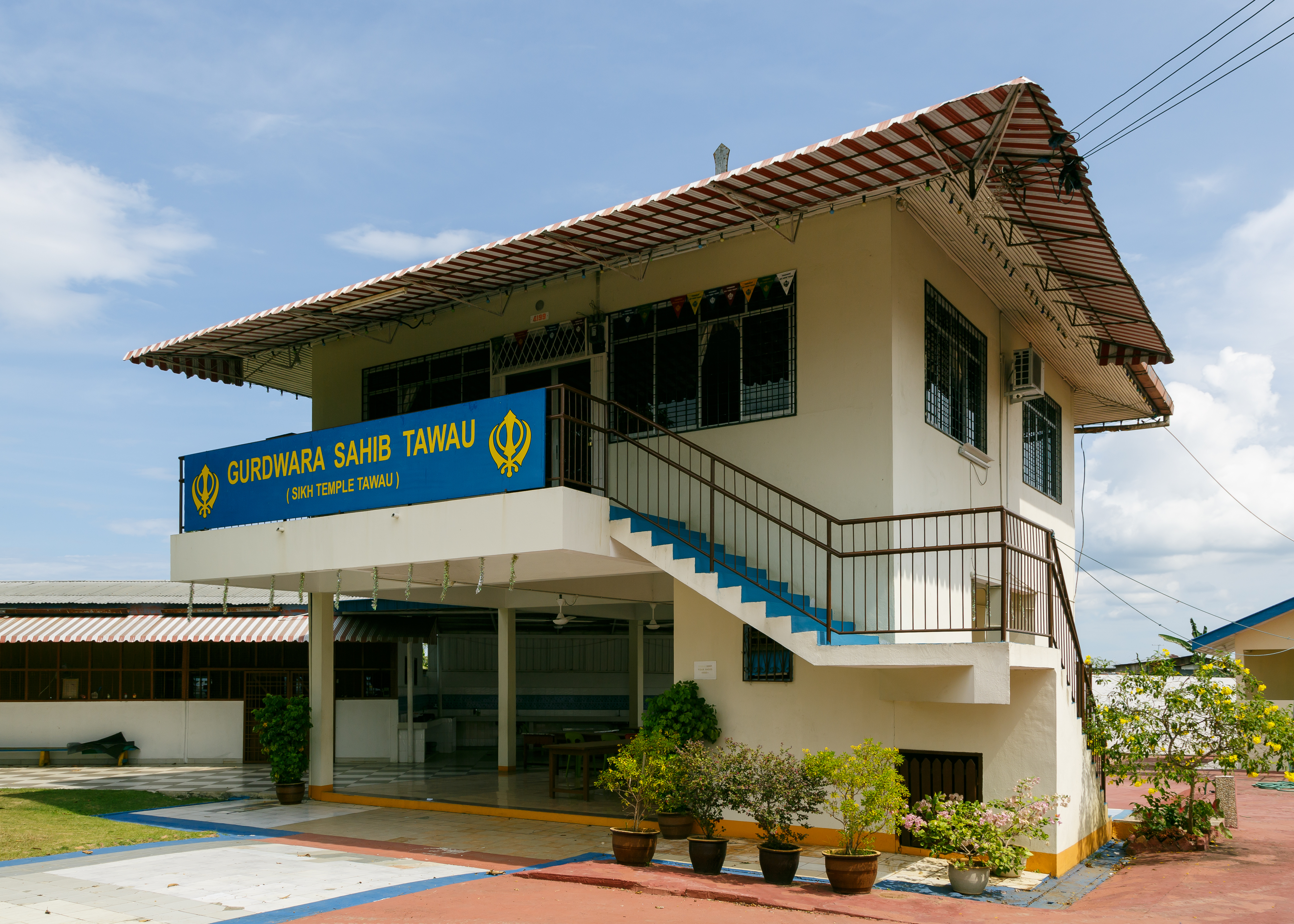
Gurdwara Sahib Tawau, a Sikh temple in Tawau.

=== Languages ===
The residents of Tawau primarily communicate in Malay, often with a distinct Sabahan creole. The Tawau version of Sabahan creole shares many similarities with the East Coast Sabahan Dialect and Bahasa Indonesia spoken in North Kalimantan across the border. Among the younger generation, there's a noticeable language shift towards speaking Sabahan Malay over their ancestral language.

The Bugis language is also prevalent in Tawau due to a considerable population with Bugis ancestry. The main Bugis dialect spoken in the town is Bone, followed closely by Enrekang-Duri and other Bugis dialects.

Given that a significant portion of Tawau's Chinese population is Hakka Chinese, Hakka Chinese is commonly spoken. Additionally, Tawau Chinese also utilise other Chinese dialects such as Cantonese, Hokkien, Teochew, Hainan and other minority dialects.

The language of the east coast Bajau community bears resemblance to the Sama language in the Philippines and Kalimantan, with borrowed words from the Suluk language. Notably, the Bajau language on the east coast differs from the west coast Bajau, which has been influenced by Malayic languages from Brunei Malay.

== Economy ==
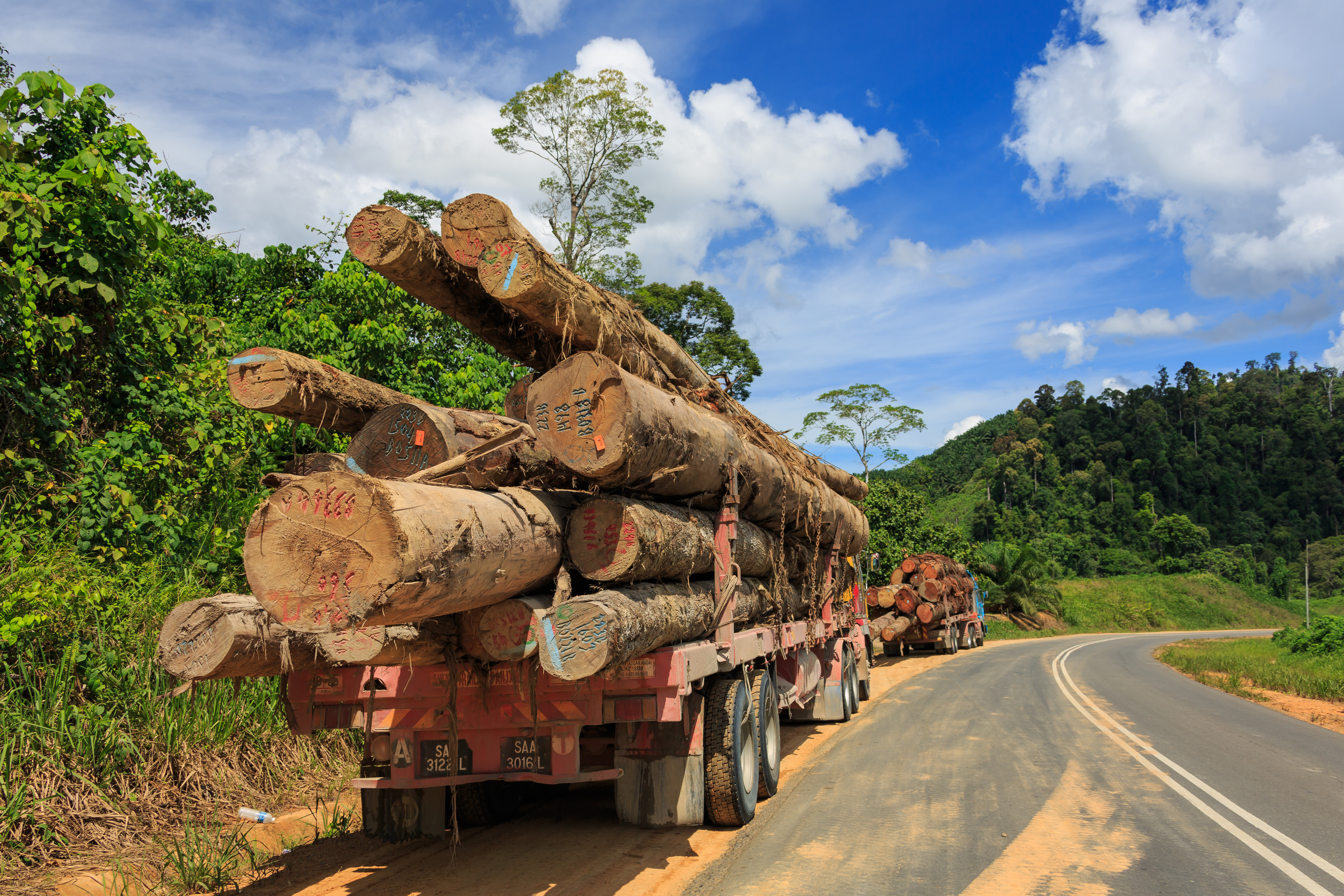
A lorry carrying timber.

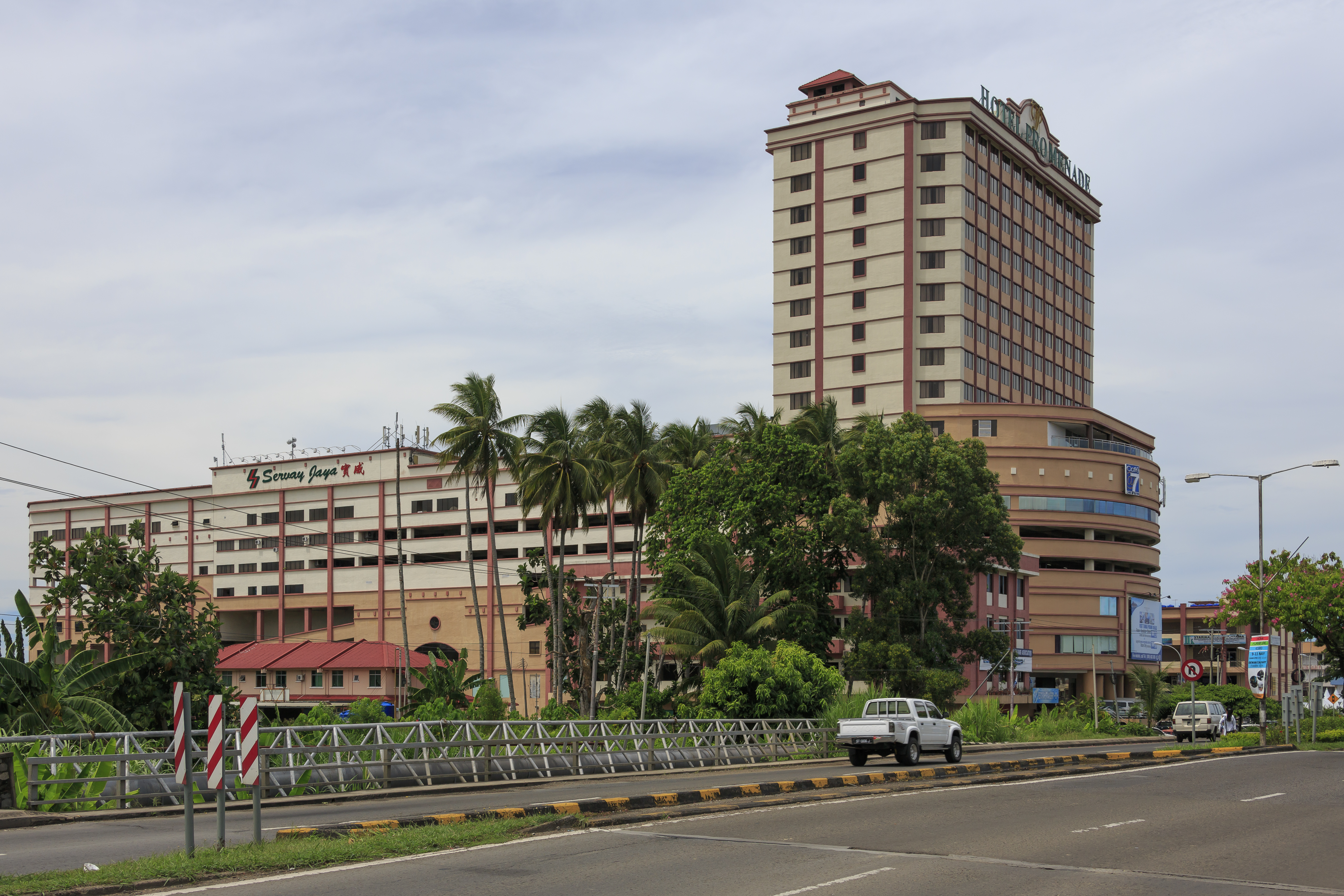
Eastern Plaza in Tawau

As of 1993, there were 40 timber-processing plants and a number of sawmills. Tawau Port is a major export and import gateway for timber especially from North Kalimantan. A barter trade has been formalised between East Kalimantan (now North Kalimantan) and Sabah with the creation of Tawau Barter Trade Association (BATS) in 1993. The association handles the cash-based trade of raw materials from Indonesia, but in recent years has focussed on timber industry. Other than timber, since British rule ended exports have traditionally been spices, cocoa and tobacco. Birds' nests are harvested at Baturong, Sengarung, Tepadung and Madai Caves by the Ida'an community. Tawau is one of the top cocoa producers in Malaysia, and the world together with Ivory Coast, Ghana and Indonesia. The town is the cocoa capital for both in Sabah and Malaysia. Cocoa production is mostly concentrated in the interior, north of the town, while palm oil production is concentrated along the roads to Merotai, Brantian, Semporna and Kunak. Both cocoa and palm oil are part of the large agriculture sector that has become the main income producer for the town.

Like in Sandakan, people in Tawau have always relied on the sea for their sustenance. Every day, hundreds of deep sea trawlers and tuckboats can be seen at the Cowie Bay. Barter trade also happens in the sea area around Tawau. The Tawau marine zone are one of Sabah four marine zones, with the other been in Sandakan, Kudat and the west coast. A great variety of high-grade fishes and all kinds of crustaceans were found in abundance in the sea and waterways around Tawau. Prawn farming has become largest sea economic source for the district. The oldest and largest prawn farm were located in this area together with six frozen shrimp processing plants.

== Transportation ==
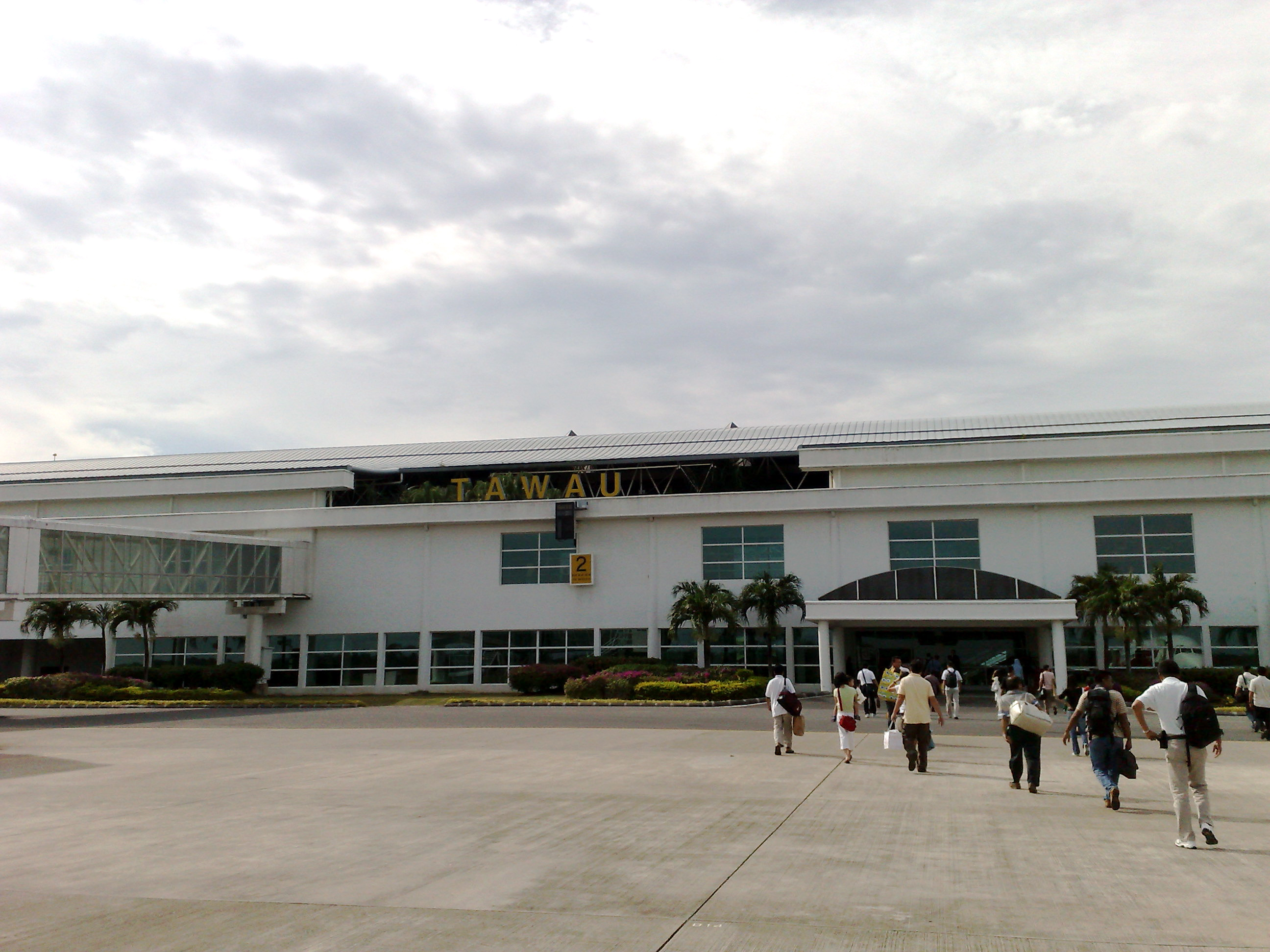
The new Tawau Airport.

=== Land ===
Most of the town's roads are state roads constructed and maintained by the state's Public Works Department. A program began in 2012 to upgrade the town's roads and increase the amount of public parking. Most major internal roads are dual-carriageways. However, despite the effort, as of 2025 the city traffic remain highly congested due to high reliance on private vehicle because of the underdeveloped public transport in the city. The only highway route from Tawau connects: Tawau – Semporna – Kunak – Lahad Datu – Sandakan (part of the Pan Borneo Highway).

Regular bus services and taxis operate in the town. The town has long-distance, short-distance and local bus stations. The long-distance services connect Tawau to Lahad Datu, Sandakan, Telupid, Ranau, Simpang Sapi, Kundasang, Kota Kinabalu, Sipitang, Beaufort, Papar and Simpang Ranau. The short-distance services connect to destinations including as Sandakan and Semporna.

=== Air ===
Tawau Airport (TA) (ICAO Code: WBKW) is the second largest airport in the state of Sabah, Malaysia, following Kota Kinabalu International Airport. It connects the town to various domestic destinations, including Johor Bahru, Kota Kinabalu, Kuala Lumpur and Sandakan, with flights operated by AirAsia, Batik Air Malaysia, Malaysia Airlines and MASWings. Before the COVID-19 pandemic, the airport also offered international regional flights several times per week, including routes to Tarakan, Indonesia, operated by MASWings, and to Bandar Seri Begawan, Brunei, via RB Link. In 2024, international flights resumed, adding various new overseas destinations, including Chengdu–Tianfu, Nanjing, Guangzhou, and Macau operated by Firefly and Batik Air.

Before 2001, Tawau was served by an older airport located on North Street (Jalan Utara). The airport's first flight took place in September 1953. During the 1960s, it handled small aircraft such as the Fokker 27. In the 1980s, the runway was widened to accommodate Boeing 737s. In the early 1970s, the airport began receiving scheduled international flights operated by Bouraq Indonesia Airlines to Tarakan and Balikpapan, Indonesia. By the mid-1990s, international destinations expanded to include Makassar served by Merpati Nusantara Airlines.

The old airport experienced a fatal accident in 1995 when Malaysia Airlines Flight 2133, a Fokker 50, crashed due to pilot error during landing, resulting in 34 fatalities. Additionally, a Cessna 208 Caravan crashed on takeoff in 1995, and a MAS Boeing 737-400 skidded off the runway in 2001, though neither of these incidents caused fatalities. The old airport was closed when the new Tawau Airport opened.

=== Sea ===
There are multiple daily passenger ferry service to the town's sea port, linking the town directly to Sungai Nyamuk, Nunukan and Tarakan in North Kalimantan, Indonesia as well as to Bongao, Tawi-Tawi in the Philippines.

The maritime route has also being used for smuggling subsidised goods from the town to certain parts in Indonesia, especially southern Sebatik, by Indonesian smugglers as this area is highly dependent on Tawau. Many Indonesians near the international border choose to seek medical treatment in the town due to the lower cost and better facilities, compared to other Indonesian towns.

== Public services ==
Tawau's court complex is on Dunlop Street. It contains the High Court, Sessions Court, and the Magistrate Court. Syariah Court is located at Abaca Street (Soon at North Street (Jalan Utara). The district police headquarters is on Tanjung Batu Street, and other police station are sited throughout the district including Wallace Bay, Bombalai, Bergosong, Kalabakan, Seri Indah and LTB Tawau. Police substations (Pondok Polis) are found in Tass Bt. 17, Apas Parit, Merotai, Quin Hill, Balung Kokos, Titingan, Kinabutan and Burmas areas, and the Tawau Prison is in the town centre.

Tawau has one public hospital, four public health clinics, three maternal and child health clinics, seven village clinics, one mobile clinic, and two community clinics. Tawau Hospital, on Tanjung Batu Street, is the town's main hospital and an important healthcare facility for patients from Semporna, Lahad Datu, Kunak, and Sandakan. Indonesian patients near the border area also frequently visit the hospital. Tawau Specialist Polyclinics (TSPC) is a walk-in healthcare clinic that sees patients from Tawau and surrounding areas as well as patients from neighbouring Philippines and Indonesia. TSPC has a range of medical specialists, a medical laboratory and radiology services. The hospital has undergone a series of modernisations since 1990 with the construction of specialist clinics, Central Sterile Services Department (CSSD), new wards and operation theatres. Tawau Specialist Hospital is the only private hospital in the town. The Tawau Regional Library is one of three regional libraries in Sabah, the others are at Keningau and Sandakan. These libraries are operated by the Sabah State Library department. Some schools, colleges, or universities have private libraries.

There are many government or state schools in and around the town. Secondary schools include Sekolah Menengah Kebangsaan Kinabutan, Sekolah Menengah Kebangsaan Jalan Apas, Sekolah Menengah Kebangsaan Kabota (now Kolej Tingkatan 6 Tawau), Sekolah Menengah Kebangsaan Kuhara, and Sekolah Menengah Kebangsaan Pasir Putih. The town has two private schools, called the Sabah Chinese High School (Sekolah Tinggi Cina Sabah) and Vision Secondary School (Sekolah Menengah Visi). Tawau has two of the three A-Level education centres in the state of Sabah—the Institute of Science and Management (ISM) and Maktab Rendah Sains Mara Tawau. A teacher-training college called Tawau Teacher Training Institute is found in the town. For tertiary education the town has the Tawau Community College and GIATMARA Tawau, and campuses of two universities, Universiti Teknologi MARA and Open University Malaysia.

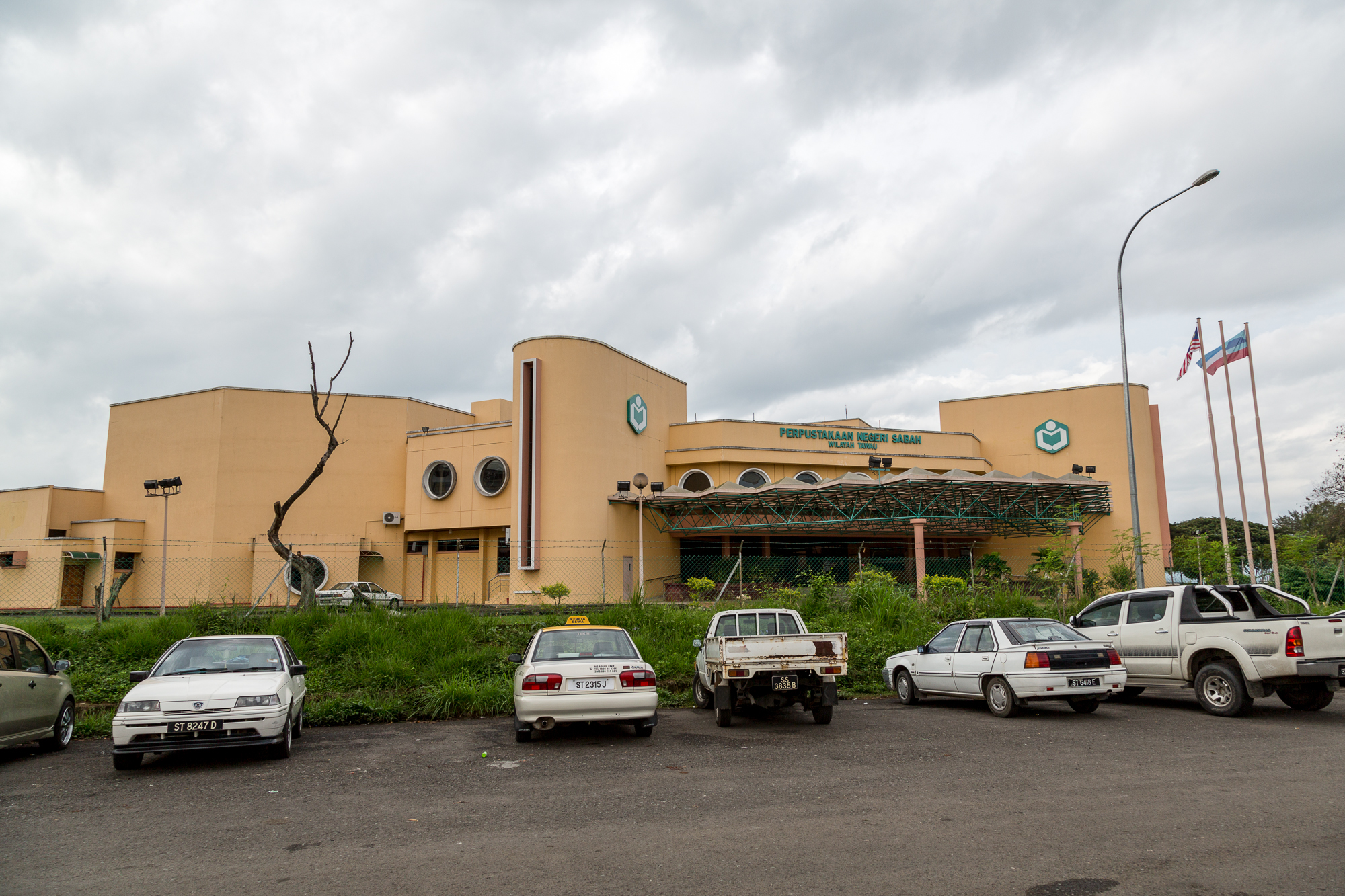
The Tawau Regional Library, one of the three regional libraries in Sabah.

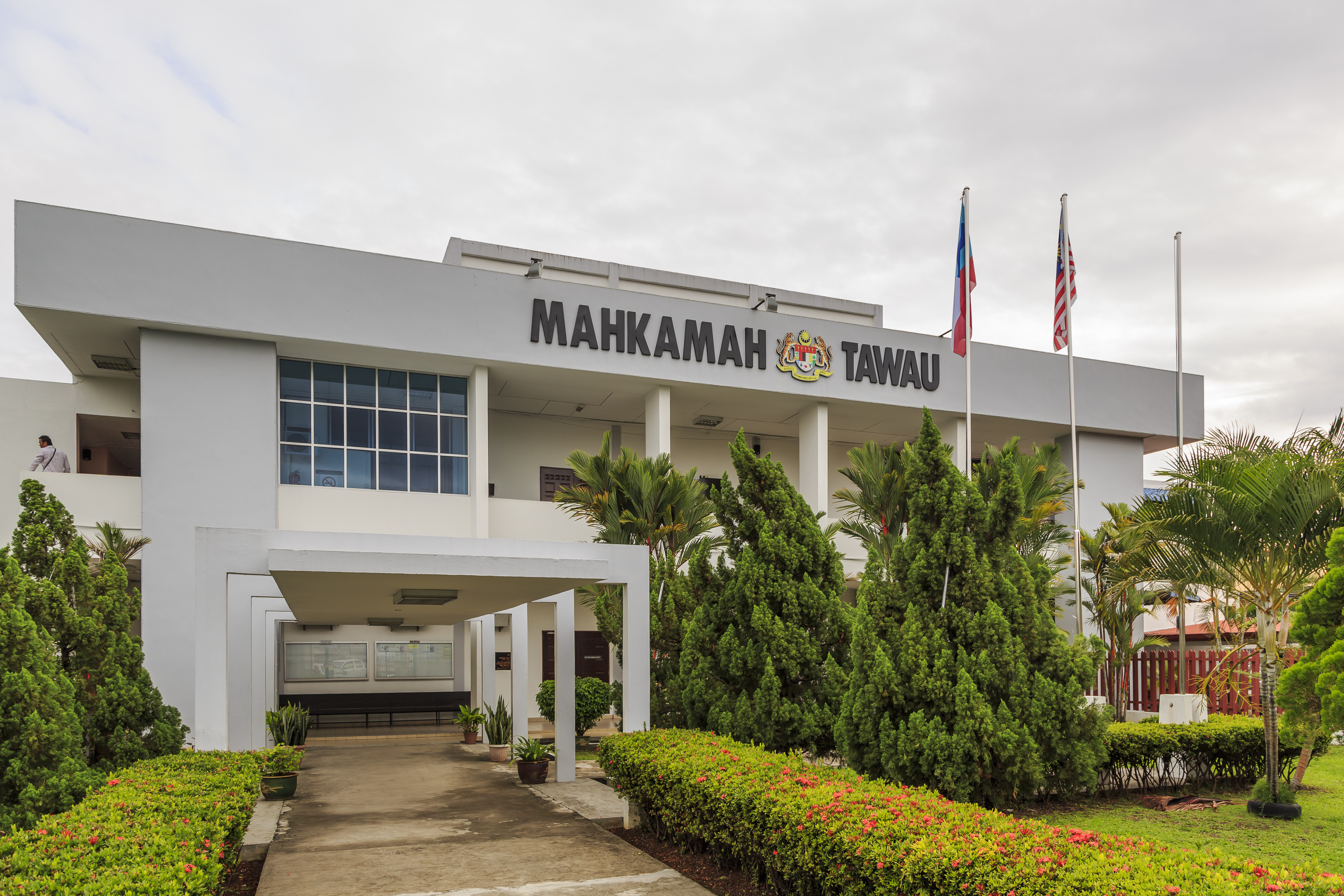
The Tawau Court Complex

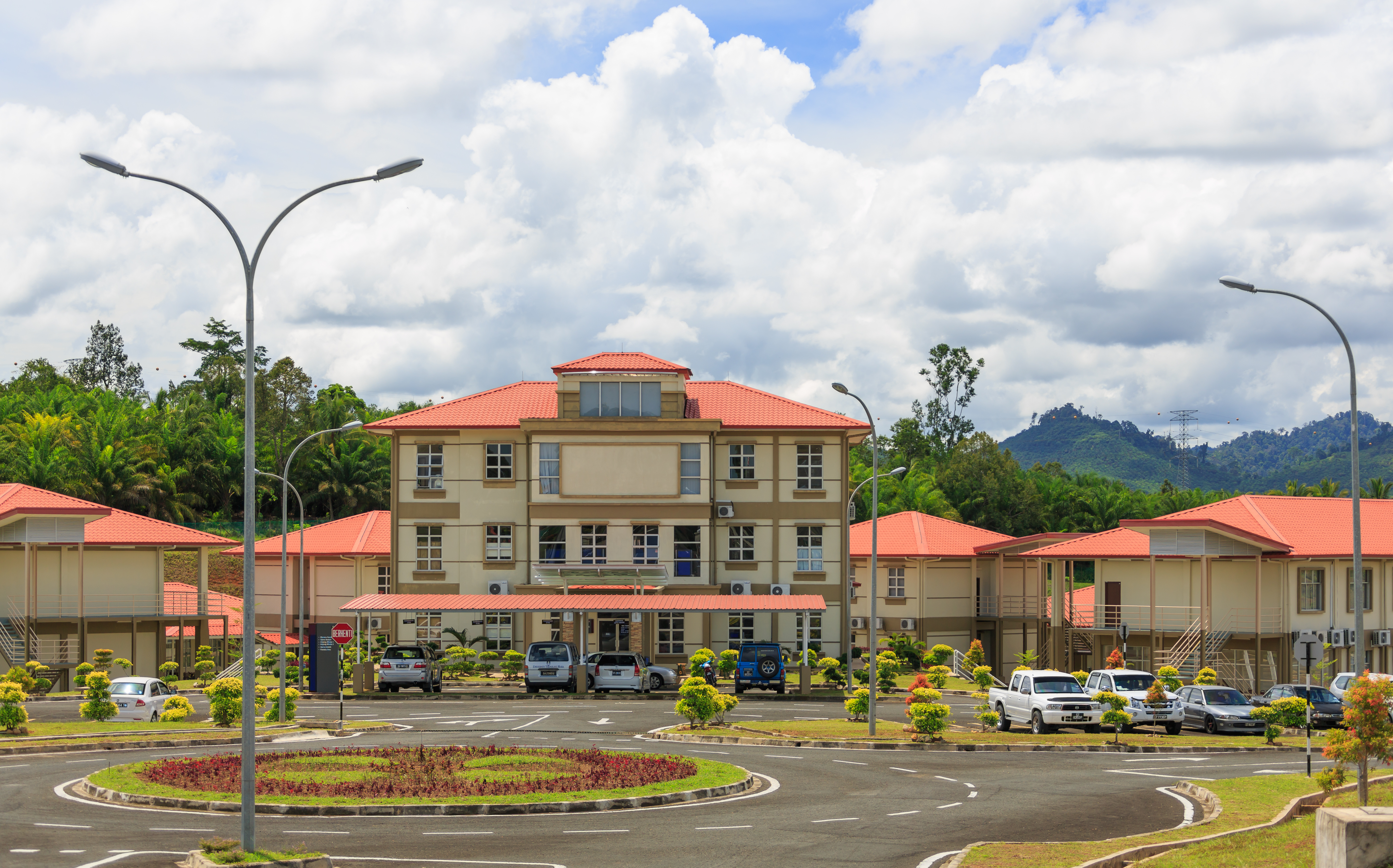
UiTM Tawau campus in Balung, Tawau.

== Culture and leisure ==
The Tawau International Cultural Festival is an annual event, first held in 2011, that has been promoted for its potential to attract tourists. The Tawau Bell Tower in the town's park was built by the Japanese in 1921 shortly after World War I to mark the close allied relations between Japan and Great Britain. Other historical attractions include the Japanese War Cemetery, Confrontation Memorial, the Public Service Memorial and the Twin Town Memorial. Tawau is one of the top cocoa production centres in Malaysia. The Teck Guan Cocoa Museum has become one of the important historical attractions for the town since it was founded in the 1970s by Datuk Seri Panglima Hong Teck Guan. Varieties of cocoa products including chocolate jam and hot cocoa beverages are sold in the museum.

Tawau has nearby conservation areas and areas set aside for leisure. The Tawau Hills National Park has picnic areas, a vast camping site, and cabins. It is 24 kilometres (15 miles) from Tawau and is accessible by road. Bukit Gemok (also known as Fat Hill) is an approximately 428-metre (1,404 ft) hill about 11 km (7 mi) from the town. It is part of the 4.45-square-kilometre (1.72 sq mi) Bukit Gemok Forest Reserve, which was declared a forest reserve in 1984. Tawau Harbour is used as a transit point to islands near the town including Sipadan, Mabul, Kapalai, Mataking, and Indonesian islands including southern Sebatik, Tarakan and Nunukan.

The main shopping area in Tawau is the Eastern Plaza located at Mile 1 on Kuhara Street. It was built in 2005, completed in 2008 and opened in May 2009. The complex has three levels of car parking with 476 covered and 49 surface parking bays. Sabindo Plaza was opened in January 1999 and is known as the first shopping centre built in Tawau. There is a market that runs alongside Dunlop Street. The Tawau Tanjung Market was established in 1999. Since then, it has expanded to house 6,000 stalls and is known as the largest indoor market in Malaysia.

The town has a sport complex with badminton, tennis, volleyball and basketball courts, and two stadiums for hockey and football. In 2014, Youth and Sports Minister Khairy Jamaluddin announced formation of a National Sports Institute (ISN) in Tawau. It will be the third sports satellite centre in Sabah once completed in 2015. A cross-border sporting event was held in 2014 between the town and Nunukan in Indonesia. It has been proposed to be repeated annually to strengthen ties between the towns.

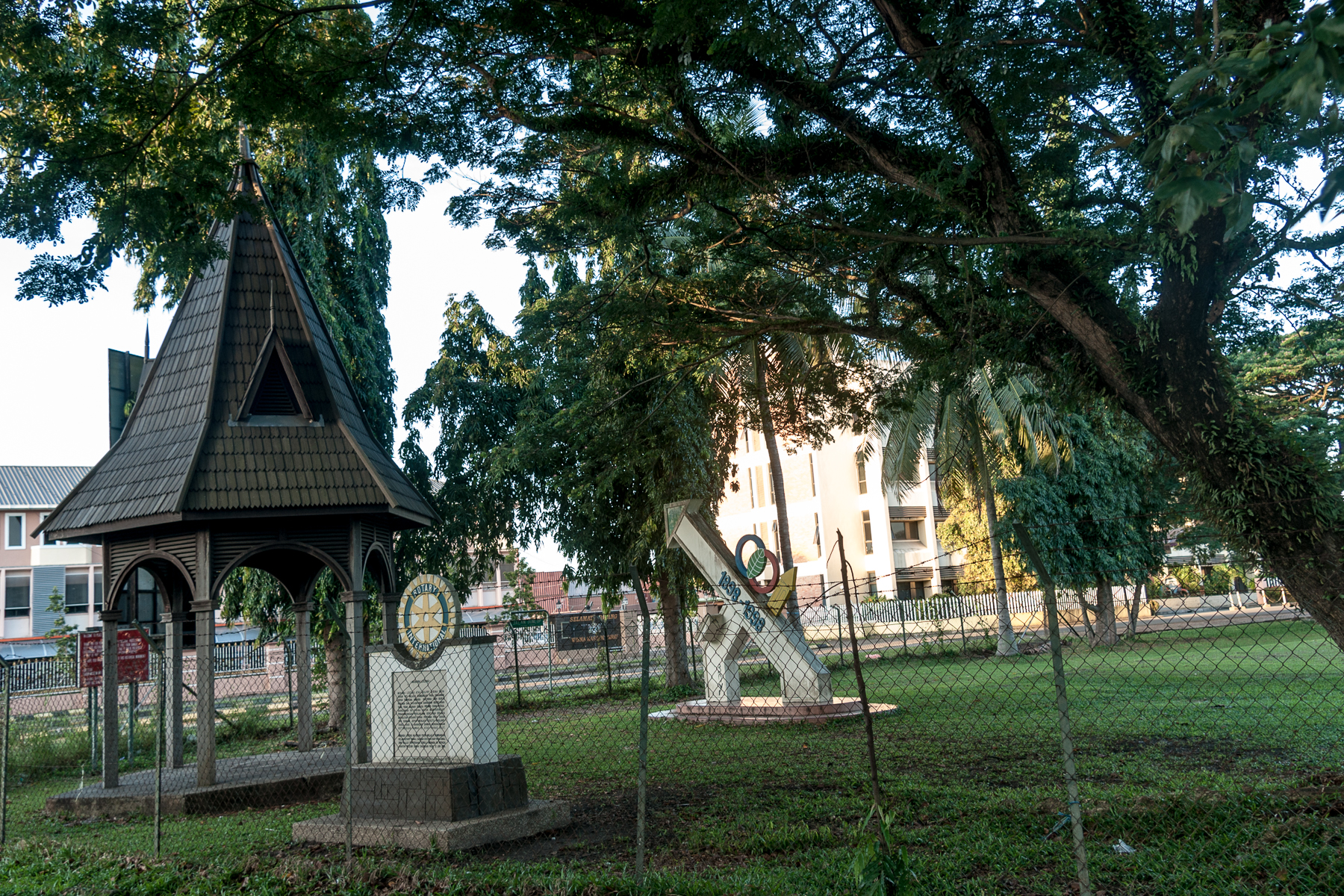
The Bell Tower (left) and the Public Service Memorial (right)

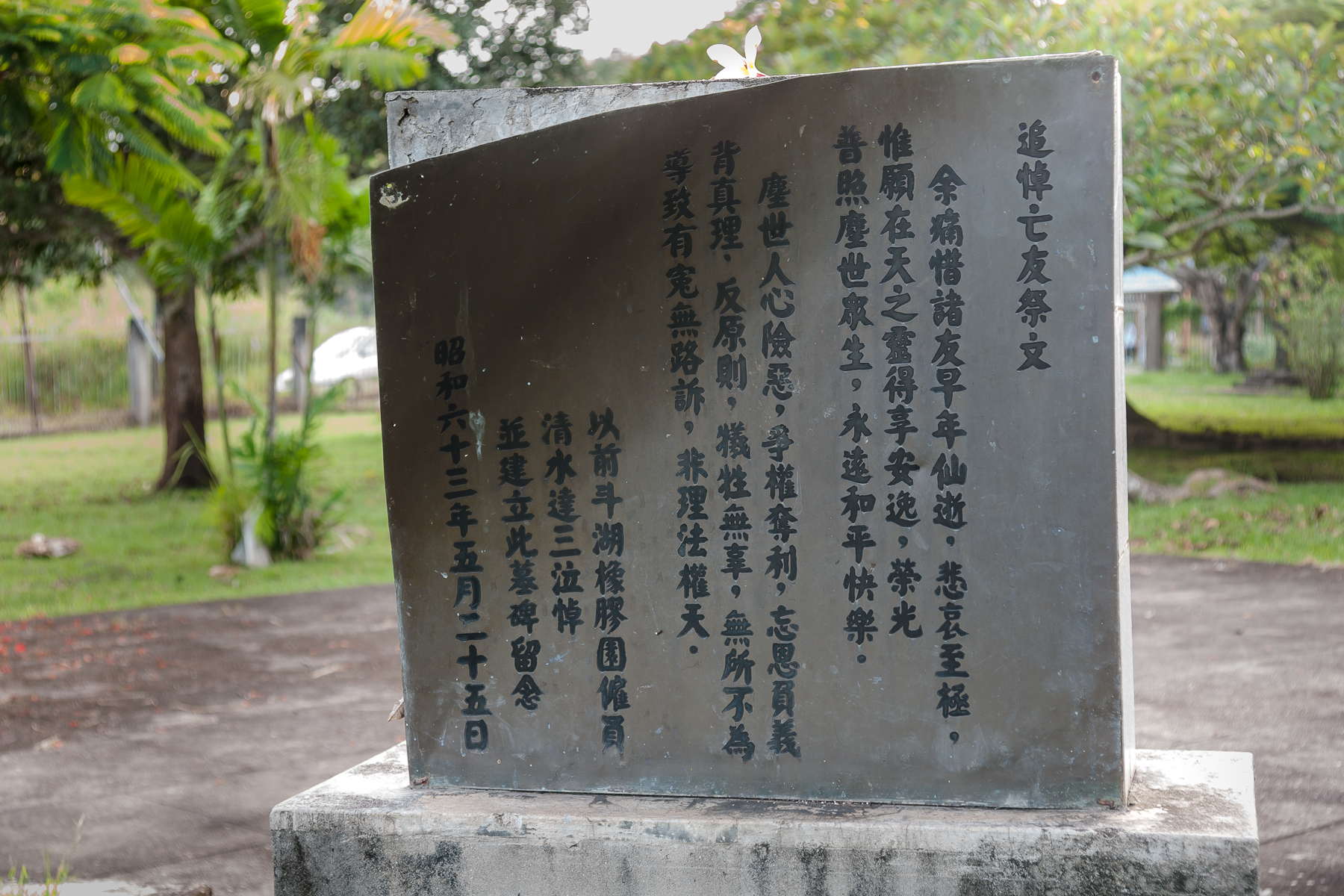
A monument in the Tawau Japanese War Memorial

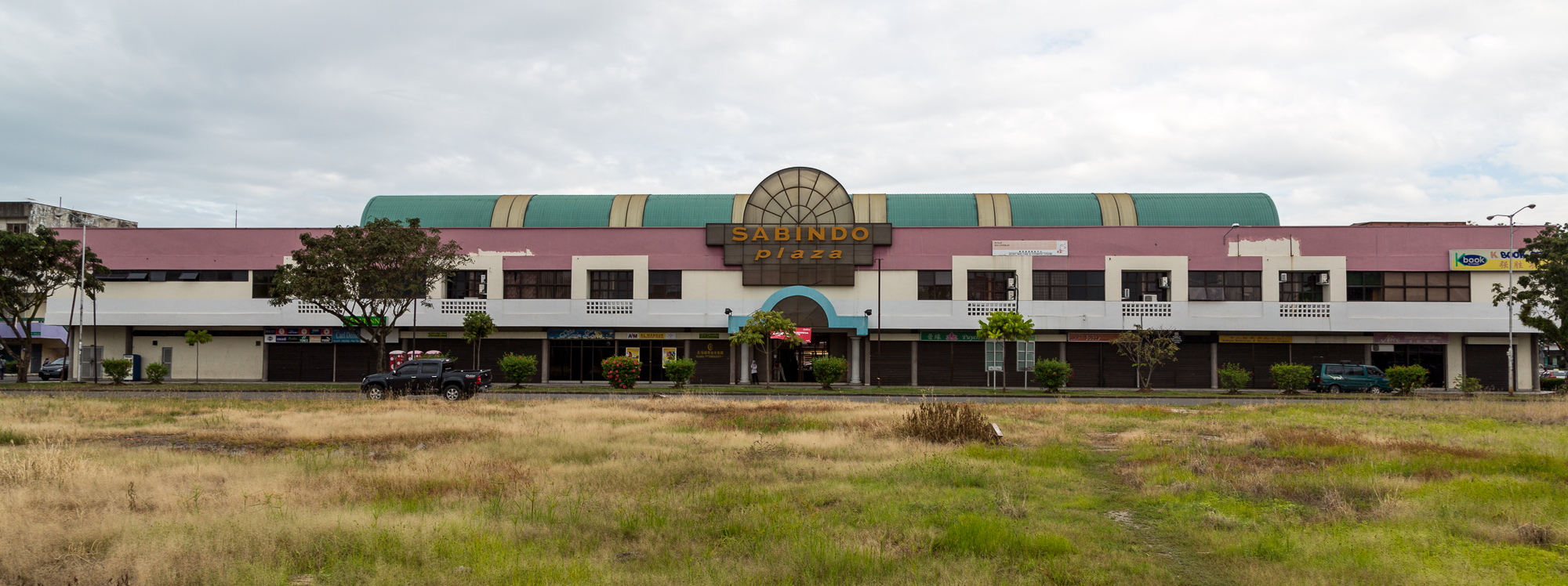
Sabindo Plaza, Tawau's first shopping centre.

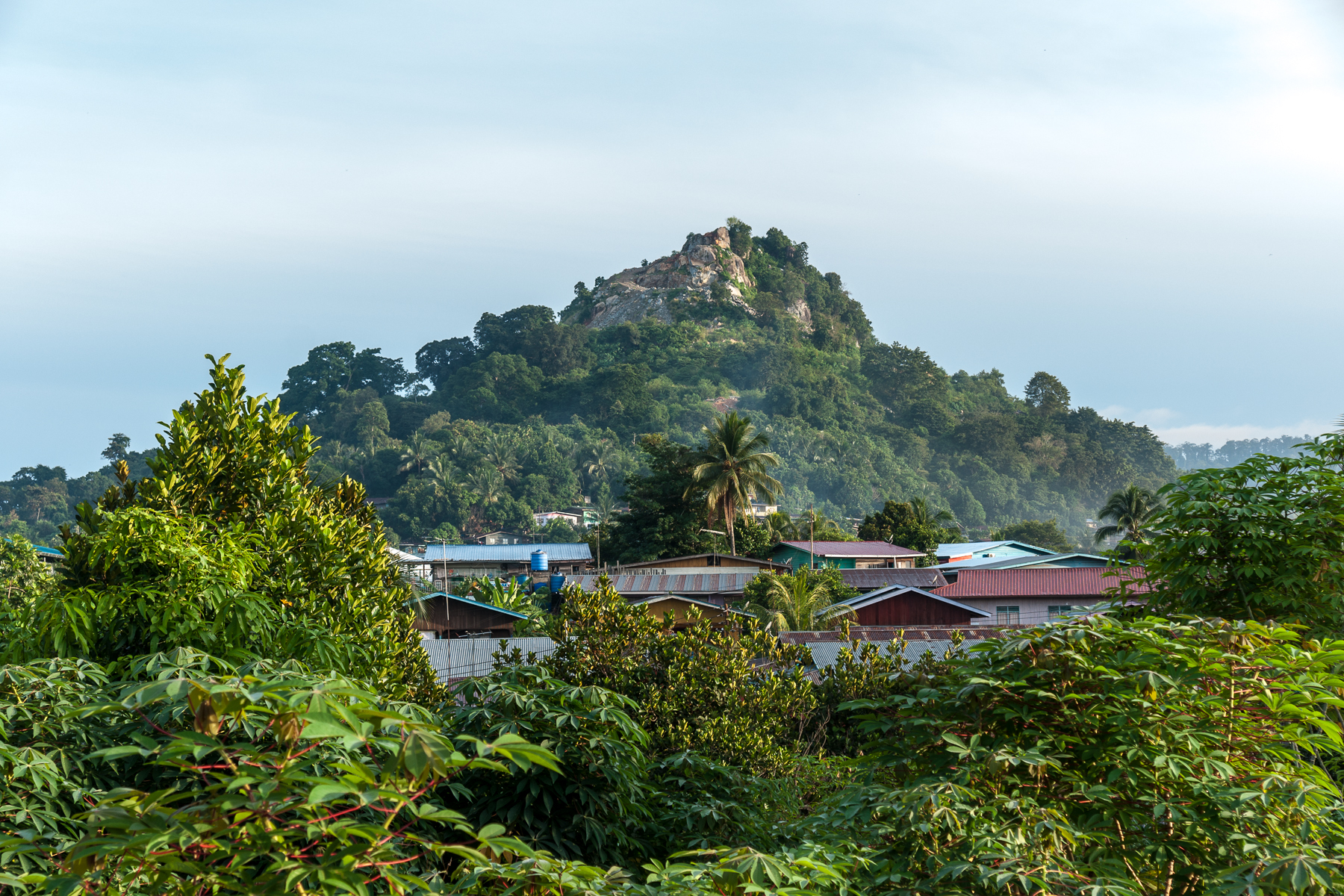
Tawau Marker Hill.

== Notable residents ==
=== Political ===
- Chua Soon Bui: Malaysian politician

=== Entertainment ===
- Amber Chia: Malaysian model
- Ayie Elham: A group member of Floor 88, singer, actor
- Firman Bansir: winner of Akademi Fantasia (season 11)
- Faizul Sany: winner of Akademi Fantasia (season 10)
- Pete Teo: Malaysian singer-songwriter, musician, film producer, music producer and actor
- Rahima Orchient Yayah: Miss Malaysia, top 10 semi-finalist for Miss World 1994 in South Africa
- Muhammad Hairi Amin: (known as MK K-Clique) Malaysian rapper and actor

Sports

- Julamri Muhammad: Malaysian football player
- Muhd Rafiuddin Rodin: Malaysian football player
- Siswanto Haidi: Malaysian cricket player
- Sumardi Hajalan: Malaysian football player

== Literature ==
- Ken Goodlet: Tawau – The Making of a Tropical Community, Opus Publications, 2010 ISBN 978-983-3987-38-2
