= Tawau Bell Tower =

Tower in Tawau, Sabah, Malaysia

- Belfry
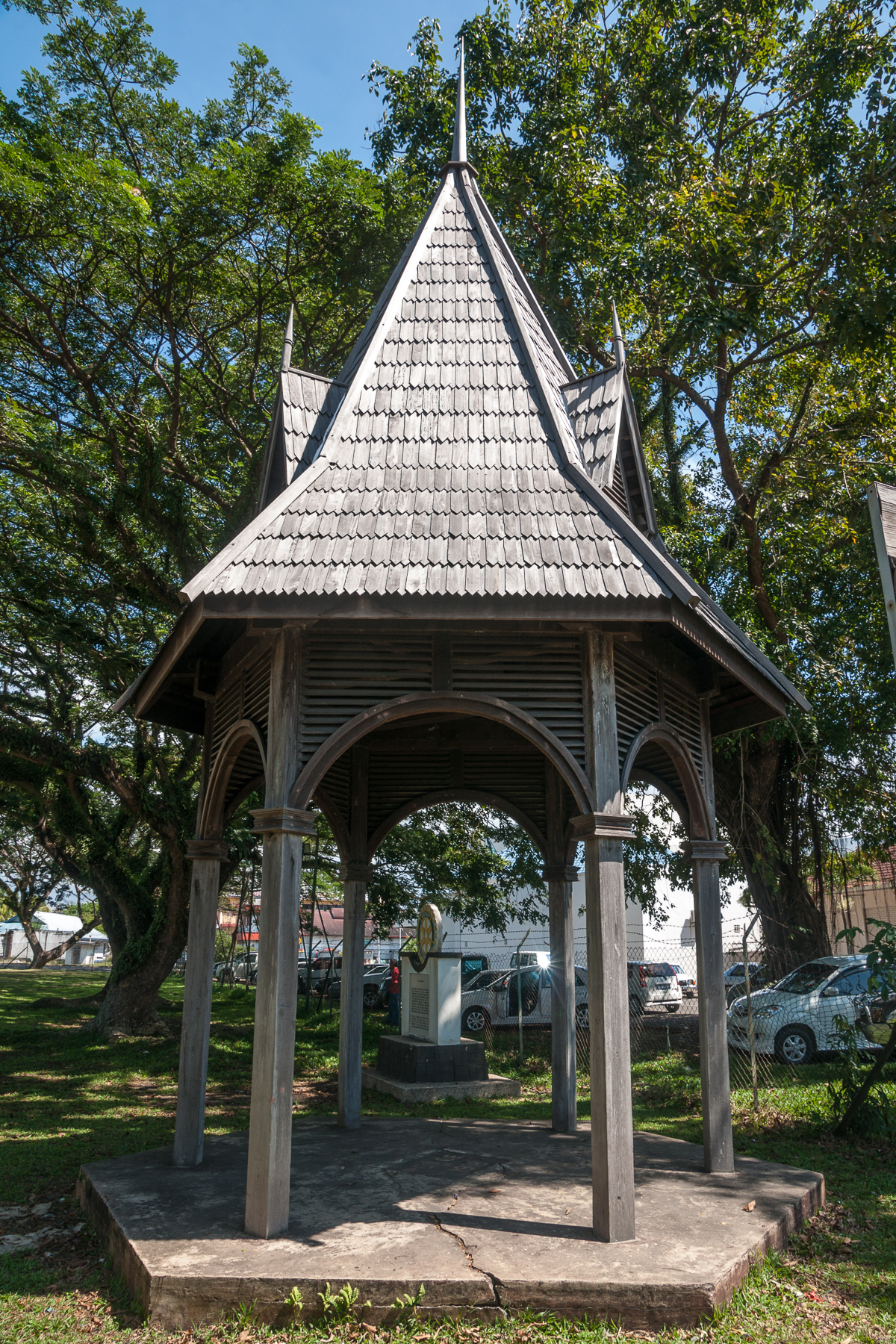
- One of the two pre-world war I structures (aside from the Tawau Japanese War Memorial) that still existing in Tawau, Sabah
- Interactive map of Tawau Bell Tower
- Location: Tawau, Sabah, Malaysia
- Coordinates: 4°14′42″N 117°52′53″E
- Type: Bell tower
- Material: Wood
- Completion date: 1921
- Dedicated to: Commemorate the signing of armistice agreement following World War I when Japan was an ally of Great Britain.

The Tawau Bell Tower (also known as the Belfry) is the oldest standing structure in Tawau, constructed by the Japanese to commemorate the signing of armistice agreement following World War I when Japan was an ally of Great Britain.

== History ==
The bell tower was constructed in 1921 by the Japanese community in North Borneo using prison labour and funds contributed by Japanese businessmen in Tawau. Its bell went missing in a sudden which became a mystery, and there is a legendary story on the missing bell:

Once upon a time in Tawau there was a tower with a bronze bell with a sound that touch the heart of every one when every it sound. But World War II did not spare this unknown town and soon the war reached Tawau. To protect the bell from our enemy and looter, we decided to hide this bell. But where could be a safe place when during the war all historical building face the risk of destruction? 1 kilometre away from the bell tower was a church. Perhaps God can protect the bell. The resident decided!

As the abandoned structure was recently almost near collapse, it was restored with funds contributed by the Rotary Club of Tawau (RCT) in 2006.

== Features ==
A bench mark is present in the tower, which shows the town's elevation above sea level, beside being the mark for starting point of the distance to every place. The East Direction leads its way to Dunlop Street, Kuhara Road, Sin On Road and Apas Road; South direction faces the Celebes Sea; West direction to Tg Batu Road; while North direction to North Road and Merotai Road.
