= Borders of Indonesia =

Political boundaries between Indonesia and neighboring territories

The borders of Indonesia include land and maritime borders with Malaysia, Papua New Guinea, and Timor-Leste, as well as shared maritime boundaries with Australia, India, Palau, Philippines, Singapore, Thailand, and Vietnam.

== Land borders ==
Indonesia has a total land border length of 3,108.3 km.

=== Malaysia ===
Indonesia shares a land border with Malaysia on the island of Borneo and Sebatik. The Indonesian provinces of East Kalimantan, North Kalimantan, and West Kalimantan lie to the south of the border while the Malaysian states of Sabah and Sarawak lie to the north. The length of the border is 2,019.5 km.

=== Papua New Guinea ===
Indonesia's border with Papua New Guinea is 820 km in length. The Indonesian province of Highland Papua, Papua, and South Papua borders Sandaun and Western provinces of Papua New Guinea.

=== Timor-Leste ===
Indonesia's border with Timor-Leste is located in Timor Island. The Indonesian province of East Nusa Tenggara borders the East Timorese municipalities of Bobonaro and Cova Lima, as well as Oecusse Special Administrative Region. The border length is 268.8 km.

== Maritime borders ==
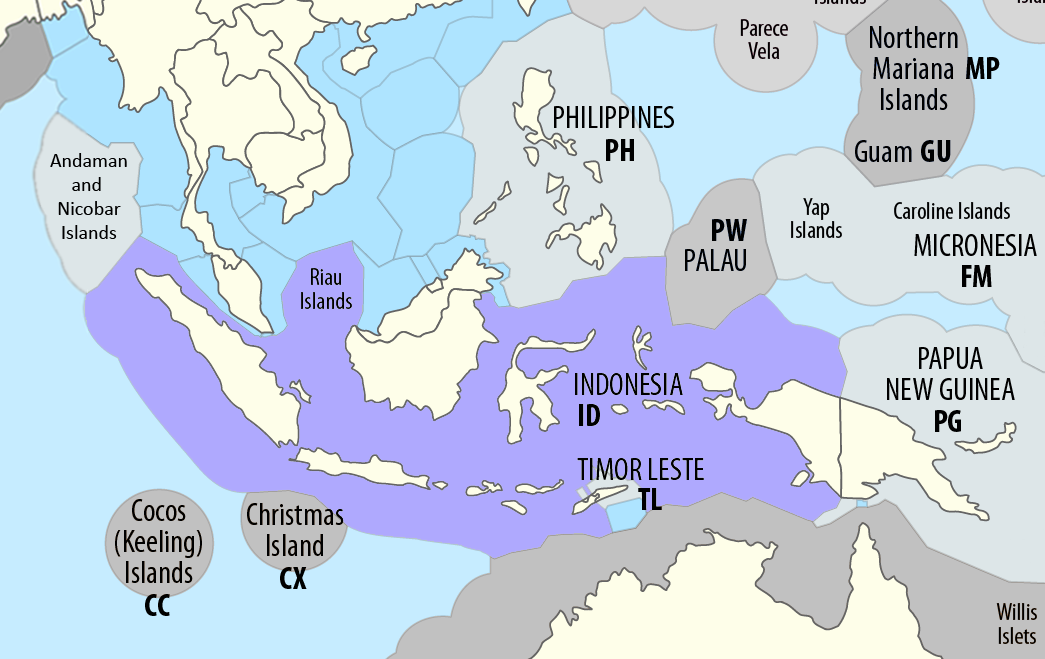

Indonesia has common maritime boundaries with Australia, India, Malaysia, Philippines, Palau, Singapore, Thailand, and Vietnam.

=== Australia ===
The boundary is separated into three segments, with the first two broken by the Timor Gap. The first is between the Australia – Indonesia – Papua New Guinea tripoint at 10° 50' S, 139° 12' E, and the point whether the territorial waters of the two countries touch the eastern limits of the territorial waters claimed by Timor-Leste at 9° 28' S, 127° 56' E. The second segment runs westward from the point where the territorial waters of the two countries touch the western limits of Timor-Leste's territorial waters claim at 10° 28' S, 126° 00' E, to 13° 05' 27.0" S, 118° 10' 08.9" E in the Indian Ocean. The third is between the Australian external territory of Christmas Island and the Indonesia island of Java, in the Indian Ocean.

The boundary is established by four treaties, the fourth of which has been signed but not yet ratified. The Agreement between the Government of the Commonwealth of Australia and the Government of the Republic of Indonesia establishing Certain Seabed Boundaries signed in Canberra on 18 May 1971 established part of the eastern segment of the seabed boundary (as well as Indonesia's maritime boundary with Papua New Guinea in the Torres Straits) while the Agreement between the Government of the Commonwealth of Australia and the Government of the Republic of Indonesia establishing certain seabed boundaries in the area of the Timor and Arafura Seas, Supplementary to the Agreement of 18 May 1971 which was signed in Jakarta on 9 October 1972 demarcated the rest of the eastern segment and a portion of the western segment of the seabed boundary. A third agreement, Agreement between Australia and Indonesia concerning Certain Boundaries between Papua New Guinea and Indonesia established the demarcation between the soon to be independent Papua New Guinea and Indonesia was signed in Jakarta on 12 February 1973. A fourth treaty, the Treaty between the Government of Australia and the Government of the Republic of Indonesia establishing an Exclusive Economic Zone Boundary and Certain Seabed Boundaries (informally known as the Australia–Indonesia Maritime Delimitation Treaty) which was signed in Perth on 14 March 1997 (however not ratified), proposes to extended the western segment of the seabed boundary to its termination point in the Indian Ocean.

The basis for establishing the boundary in the 1971 and 1972 treaties was that of the "natural prolongation" of the physical continental shelf. This resulted in the boundary running significantly north of the median line between the shores of Australia and Indonesia, thus benefiting Australia in terms of the division of the seabed ownership. The International Law view of settling overlapping claims has then moved towards the median-line concept, although Australia still holds the view that natural prolongation was still relevant to determine the sovereignty of the seabed. This resulted in the separate treatment of establishing the seabed boundary and that for the water column, or essentially, the separation of the continental shelf and exclusive economic zone boundaries under the 1997 treaty.

The independence of Timor-Leste on 20 May 2002 may result in changes in the Australia–Indonesia border near the Timor Gap which were established by the three treaties. Provisions of the 1997 treaty on matters concerning the Timor Gap – such as reaffirming the Timor Gap Treaty between Australia and Indonesia and the drawing of the water column boundary through the area of joint development – would no longer be applicable with Timor-Leste becoming the rightful claimant of the seabed and exclusive economic zone in the area. Furthermore, the "Timor Gap terminal points" established by the 1972 treaty, namely Points A16 and A17, might have to be renegotiated by Australia, Timor-Leste and Indonesia, as Timor-Leste might have the basis to seek a "wider" Timor Gap than originally provided by Australia and Indonesia.

==== Seabed (continental shelf) boundary ====
===== Eastern segment =====
The eastern segment of the boundary was established by both the 1971 and 1972 treaties, the former delimiting the border from A3 to A12 and the latter extending it from A12 to A16, which lies on the eastern border of the Australia – Timor-Leste joint petroleum development area. Points A1, A2 and A3 form part of the Indonesia – Papua New Guinea border which was also established under the 1971 treaty when Papua New Guinea was still an Australian territory.

Point	Longitude (E)	Latitude (S)	Remarks
Australia, Indonesia and Papua New Guinea common tripoint
A3	139° 12'	10° 50'	
Eastern segment of the Australia-Indonesia seabed boundary
A4	138° 38'	10° 24'	
A5	138° 35'	10° 22'	
A6	138° 13'	10° 9'	
A7	137° 45'	9° 57'	
A8	135° 29'	9° 8'	
A9	135° 13'	9° 17'	
A10	135° 3'	9° 22'	
A11	134° 50'	9° 25'	
A12	133° 23'	8° 53'	
A13	133° 14'	8° 54'	
A14	130° 10'	9° 25'	
A15	128°	9° 25'	
A16	127° 56'	9° 28'	This point lies on the eastern border of the Australia–Timor-Leste joint petroleum development area, may be subject to change after negotiations with Timor-Leste

===== Western segment =====
The 1972 treaty brought the boundary to Point A25 to the north-east of Australia's Ashmore Island. The 1997 treaty extended it further west, terminating at A82 in the Indian Ocean where Australia's and Indonesia's exclusive economic zone limits diverge.

Point	Longitude (E)	Latitude (S)	Remarks
Western segment of the Australia-Indonesia seabed boundary pursuant to 1972 treaty
A17	126°	10° 28'	This point lies on the western border of the Australia–Timor-Leste joint petroleum development area, may be subject to change after negotiations with Timor-Leste
A18	125° 41'	10° 37'	
A19	125° 19'	11° 1'	
A20	124° 34'	11° 7'	
A21	124° 10'	11° 25'	
A22	124°	11° 26'	
A23	123° 40'	11° 28'	
A24	123° 26'	11° 23'	
A25	123° 14'	11° 35'	
Western extension of the boundary pursuant to 1997 treaty
A26	123° 14' 4.5"	11° 48' 6.1"	
A27	123° 13' 38.1"	11° 47' 59.3"	
A28	123° 12' 12.7"	11° 47' 40.3"	
A29	123° 12' 5.1"	11° 47' 38.9"	
A30	123° 11' 2.9"	11° 47' 25.6"	
A31	123° 5' 27.9"	11° 46' 25.7"	
A32	123° 0' 49.7"	11° 46' 31.8"	
A33	122° 59' 22.9"	11° 46' 44.2"	
A34	122° 57' 32.5"	11° 47' 07.4"	
A35	122° 56' 8.2"	11° 47' 31"	
A36	122° 53' 24.7"	11° 48' 32.1"	
A37	122° 50' 34.5"	11° 50' 0.6"	
A38	122° 49' 19.9"	11° 50' 48.1"	
A39	122° 48' 5.1"	11° 51' 12.9"	
A40	122° 47' 38.9"	11° 51' 22.4"	
A41	122° 46' 21.2"	11° 51' 53.3"	
A42	122° 44' 16.8"	11° 52' 53.4"	
A43	122° 41' 4.3"	11° 54' 56.3"	
A44	122° 40' 0.5"	11° 55' 46.7"	
A45	122° 35' 27.9"	12° 0' 41.4"	
A46	122° 34' 33.8"	12° 2' 5"	
A47	122° 33' 55.8"	12° 3' 12.2"	
A48	122° 32' 24.1"	12° 6' 44.6"	The border then proceeds southerly in an arc of a circle drawn concave to Ashmore Island with a radius of 24 nautical miles (44 km) to Point A49
A49	122° 31' 6.6"	12° 14' 25.8"	
A50	120° 0' 46.9"	13° 56' 31.7"	
A51	120° 0' 46.9"	12° 46' 27.9"	
A52	119° 59' 31"	12° 45' 47"	
A53	119° 59' 15"	12° 45' 38"	
A54	119° 56' 13"	12° 43' 46"	
A55	119° 53' 18"	12° 41' 57"	
A56	119° 52' 57"	12° 41' 46"	
A57	119° 52' 38"	12° 41' 36"	
A58	119° 50' 28"	12° 40' 33"	
A59	119° 40' 33"	12° 35' 43"	
A60	119° 33' 16"	12° 32' 31"	
A61	12° 29' 19"	119° 27' 17"	
A62	12° 25' 43"	119° 21' 35"	
A63	12° 24' 59"	119° 20' 34"	
A64	12° 23' 58"	119° 16' 35"	
A65	12° 23' 42"	119° 15' 23"	
A66	12° 21' 51"	119° 9' 3"	
A67	12° 20' 21"	119° 5' 0"	
A68	12° 19' 55"	119° 2' 40"	
A69	12° 18' 50"	118° 58' 31"	
A70	12° 17' 54"	118° 55' 12"	
A71	12° 15' 57"	118° 49' 30"	
A72	12° 13' 12"	118° 43' 9"	
A73	12° 11' 1"	118° 39' 0"	
A74	12° 10' 26"	118° 37' 28"	
A75	12° 10' 6"	118° 35' 16"	
A76	12° 7' 46"	118° 25' 07"	
A77	12° 6' 21"	118° 20' 45"	
A78	12° 4' 19"	118° 7' 44"	
A79	12° 4' 8.8"	118° 6' 14.4"	
A80	12° 4' 24.9"	118° 6' 17.2"	
A81	12° 49' 54.8"	118° 14' 22.6"	
A82	13° 5' 27.0"	118° 10' 8.9"	

===== Christmas Island/Java segment =====
Christmas Island is an external territory of Australia located in the Indian Ocean 186 nautical miles (344 km) south of the southern coast of Java. The maritime boundary between the island and Indonesia which was established by the 1997 treaty is a modified median line which lies closer to the island by virtue of it being an isolated island lying next to the coastline of a larger country. The boundary generally runs east–west and terminates both ends where the boundary of the Australian exclusive economic zone created around Christmas Island diverges from the Indonesian EEZ. Unlike the boundary in the Arafura and Timor Seas, there are no separate boundaries for the seabed and water column.

Point	Longitude (E)	Latitude (S)
Christmas Island/Java boundary
C1	109° 1' 25.8"	11° 10' 24.6"
C2	105° 50' 55.4"	9° 46' 49.8"
C3	102° 34' 12.7"	8° 52' 14.1"

==== Water column (exclusive economic zone) boundary ====
A separate "water column boundary", essentially an exclusive economic zone boundary for the ownership of fishery resources, was created under the 1997 treaty. The boundary starts from the Australia-Indonesia-Papua New Guinea tripoint at 10° 50' 00" S, 139° 12' 00" E, which is Point A3 of the seabed boundary and designated as Point Z1 of the water column boundary. It runs to the south of the Australia-Indonesia seabed boundary and terminates in the Indian Ocean where the Australian and Indonesia EEZ diverge. The boundary essentially follows the Provisional Fisheries Surveillance and Enforcement Line (PFSEL), a non-treaty status agreement made in 1981 between the two countries, and is generally based on the median line principle measures from the Australian mainland and Indonesian archipelagic baseline.

The 1997 treaty essentially separates the sovereignty of the seabed and water column in the area between the water column boundary and the seabed boundary, whereby Australia has sovereignty over the seabed and its resources, while Indonesia has sovereignty over the water column and the resources which live in it.

Although the 1997 treaty did not "close" the Timor Gap by establishing the seabed boundary in the area, it however established the water column boundary, which virtually corresponded with the boundary between Zone A and Zone B under the Timor Gap Treaty. With the independence of Timor-Leste, this stretch of the water column boundary between Point Z28 and Point Z36 was no longer applicable. The stretch is now replaced with a "water column jurisdiction" line drawn by the Treaty on Certain Maritime Arrangements in the Timor Sea between Australia and Timor-Leste signed on 12 January 2006 which corresponds with the southern border of the Australia–Timor-Leste Joint Petroleum Development Area (JPDA), with Australia having control over the water column south of the line, and Timor-Leste to the north including over the entire JPDA.

Point	Longitude (E)	Latitude (S)	Remarks
Australia-Indonesia water column (EEZ) boundary
Z1	139° 12' 00"	10° 50' 00"	
Z2	138° 38' 00"	10° 24' 00"	
Z3	138° 35' 00"	10° 22' 00"	
Z4	138° 13' 00"	10° 09' 00"	
Z5	137° 45' 00"	9° 57' 00"	
Z6	135° 29' 00"	9° 08' 00"	
Z7	135° 13' 00"	9° 17' 00"	
Z8	135° 03' 00"	9° 22' 00"	
Z9	134° 50' 00"	9° 25' 00"	
Z10	133° 23' 00"	8° 53' 00"	
Z11	132° 46' 00"	9° 06' 00"	
Z12	132° 33' 00"	9° 14' 00"	
Z13	132° 30' 00"	9° 16' 00"	
Z14	132° 20' 00"	9° 20' 00"	
Z15	132° 12' 00"	9° 23' 00"	
Z16	131° 57' 00"	9° 31' 00"	
Z17	131° 52' 00"	9° 33' 00"	
Z18	131° 43' 00"	9° 36' 00"	
Z19	131° 31' 00"	9° 40' 00"	
Z20	131° 28' 00"	9° 42' 00"	
Z21	130° 55' 00"	9° 47' 00"	
Z22	130° 43' 00"	9° 45' 00"	
Z23	130° 06' 00"	9° 39' 00"	
Z24	129° 30' 00"	9° 45' 00"	
Z25	129° 01' 00"	9° 59' 00"	
Z26	128° 18' 00"	10° 26' 00"	
Z27	128° 14' 00"	10° 28' 00"	
Z28	128° 12' 28.4"	10° 29' 11.8"	No longer applicable with Timor-Leste's independence
Z29	127° 59' 20.4"	10° 43' 37.8"	No longer applicable with Timor-Leste's independence
Z30	127° 48' 49.4"	10° 53' 36.8"	No longer applicable with Timor-Leste's independence
Z31	127° 47' 08.4"	10° 55' 20.8"	No longer applicable with Timor-Leste's independence
Z32	127° 31' 37.4"	11° 14' 18.9"	No longer applicable with Timor-Leste's independence
Z33	126° 58' 17.4"	11° 17' 24.9"	No longer applicable with Timor-Leste's independence
Z34	126° 57' 11.4"	11° 17' 30.9"	No longer applicable with Timor-Leste's independence
Z35	126° 47' 08.4"	11° 19' 40.9"	No longer applicable with Timor-Leste's independence
Z36	126° 31' 58.4"	11° 20' 02.9"	No longer applicable with Timor-Leste's independence
Z37	126° 31' 00"	11° 20' 00"	
Z38	126° 28' 00"	11° 21' 00"	
Z39	126° 12' 00"	11° 26' 00"	
Z40	126° 00' 00"	11° 31' 00"	
Z41	125° 45' 00"	11° 37' 00"	
Z42	125° 25' 00"	11° 45' 00"	
Z43	125° 20' 00"	11° 47' 00"	
Z44	123° 33' 55.1"	12° 15' 34.4"	thence northerly along the arc of a circle drawn concave to Ashmore Islands with a radius of 24 nautical miles (44 km) to the following point
Z45	123° 33' 55.8"	12° 14' 46.7"	
Thence generally northerly, north-westerly, westerly, south-westerly, and southerly along a series of intersecting circular arcs drawn concave to Ashmore Islands with a radius of 24 nautical miles (44 km) and having the following vertices:-
Z46	123° 33' 50.3"	12° 12' 43.7"	
Z47	123° 33' 19.1"	12° 09' 21.0"	
Z48	123° 32' 57.8"	12° 07' 56.3"	
Z49	123° 32' 42.5"	12° 07' 04.6"	
Z50	123° 31' 45.6"	12° 04' 15.3"	
Z51	123° 30' 32.4"	12° 01' 34.7"	
Z52	123° 29' 41.2"	12° 00' 01.1"	
Z53	123° 29' 08.7"	11° 59' 08.6"	
Z54	123° 28' 56.2"	11° 58' 49.6"	
Z55	123° 28' 54.5"	11° 58' 46.9"	
Z56	123° 27' 32.8"	11° 56' 52.6"	
Z57	123° 25' 59.8"	11° 55' 05.8"	
Z58	123° 21' 44.0"	11° 51' 32.1"	
Z59	123° 19' 07.9"	11° 50' 02.2"	
Z60	123° 18' 32.9"	11° 49' 45.0"	
Z61	123° 16' 44.4"	11° 48' 58.5"	
Z62	123° 15' 32.5"	11° 48' 32.5"	
Z63	123° 13' 38.1"	11° 47' 59.3"	
Z64	123° 12' 12.7"	11° 47' 40.3"	
Z65	123° 12' 05.2"	11° 47' 38.9"	
Z66	123° 11' 02.9"	11° 47' 25.6"	
Z67	123° 05' 27.9"	11° 46' 25.7"	
Z68	123° 00' 49.7"	11° 46' 31.8"	
Z69	122° 59' 22.9"	11° 46' 44.2"	
Z70	122° 57' 32.5"	11° 47' 07.4"	
Z71	122° 56' 08.2"	11° 47' 31.0"	
Z72	122° 53' 24.7"	11° 48' 32.1"	
Z73	122° 50' 34.5"	11° 50' 00.6"	
Z74	122° 49' 19.9"	11° 50' 48.1"	
Z75	122° 48' 05.1"	11° 51' 12.9"	
Z76	122° 47' 38.9"	11° 51' 22.4"	
Z77	122° 46' 21.2"	11° 51' 53.3"	
Z78	122° 44' 16.8"	11° 52' 53.4"	
Z79	122° 41' 04.3"	11° 54' 56.3"	
Z80	122° 40' 00.5"	11° 55' 46.7"	
Z81	122° 35' 27.9"	12° 00' 41.4"	
Z82	122° 34' 33.8"	12° 02' 05.0"	
Z83	122° 33' 55.8"	12° 03' 12.2"	
Z84	122° 32' 24.1"	12° 06' 44.6"	
Thence southerly along the arc of a circle drawn concave to Ashmore Islands with a radius of 24 nautical miles (44 km) to the point:
Z85	122° 31' 06.6"	12° 14' 25.8"	
Z86	122° 31' 06.6"	12° 50' 28.2"	
Z87	121° 49' 00"	13° 15' 00"	
Z88	120° 00' 46.9"	13° 56' 31.7"	
Thence north-westerly along the arc of a circle with a radius of 200 nautical miles (370 km) drawn through the following points:
Z89	119° 52' 30.7"	13° 53' 03.7"	
Z90	119° 44' 24.5"	13° 49' 14.5"	
Z91	119° 36' 29.3"	13° 45' 04.5"	
To the point:
Z92	119° 28' 46.1"	13° 40' 34.1"	
Z93	119° 22' 08.7"	13° 36' 30.2"	
Thence north-westerly along the arc of a circle with a radius of 200 nautical miles (370 km) drawn through the following points:
Z94	119° 13' 33.5"	13° 34' 26.1"	
Z95	119° 05' 04.4"	13° 32' 00.1"	
Z96	118° 56' 42.4"	13° 29' 12.5"	
Z97	118° 48' 28.4"	13° 26' 03.7"	
Z98	118° 40' 23.4"	13° 22' 34.0"	
Z99	118° 32' 28.3"	13° 18' 43.8"	
To the point:
Z100	118° 24' 44.1"	13° 14' 33.6"	

=== Timor-Leste ===
The Indonesia–Timor-Leste border consists of two non-contiguous sections totalling 253 km (157 mi) in length, the larger section of which divides the island of Timor in two. The demarcation of the border between Indonesia and Timor-Leste has been fought over by various parties for 350 years. The Permanent Court of Arbitration's award of 25 June 1914 established the final land border on the island. Still disputed on some points until 2019, it largely coincides with today's border between the state of Timor-Leste (East Timor), which gained its final independence in 2002, and West Timor, which belongs to Indonesia.

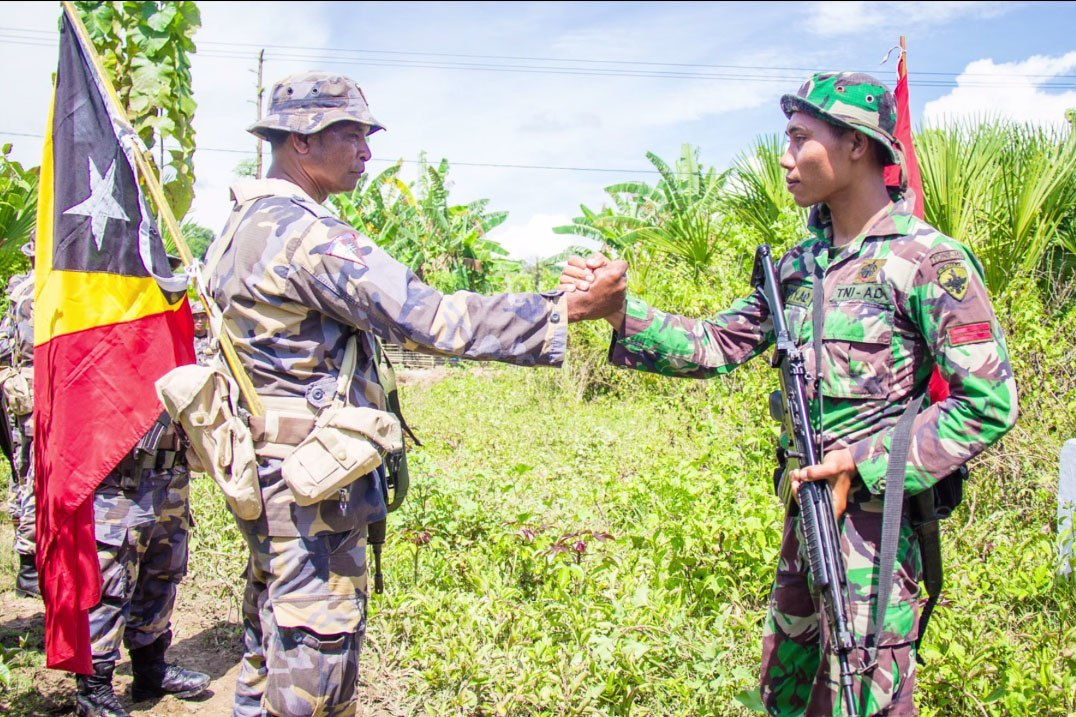
An East Timorese border guard and an Indonesian soldier

==== Western (Oecusse) section ====
The Municipality of Oecusse forms an exclave of Timor-Leste in Indonesian West Timor (part of East Nusa Tenggara province). The border starts in the west at the coast of the Savu Sea, proceeding overland to the south to the Noel Besi River, which it then follows south, then east, then south. The border then turns east overland briefly, before turning to the north, utilising various rivers such as the Ekan, Sonau and Bilomi, before proceeding northwards overland to the Savu coast.

==== Eastern section ====
The border between Indonesia and the main part of Timor-Leste starts in the north at the Savu Sea coast, and proceeds south and then east via the Talu river. It then turns south along the Malibacu river, and then west along the Tafara river, then south along the Massin river down to the coast at the Timor Sea.

=== India ===
Indonesia borders the Andaman and Nicobar Islands and is close to the Indira point.

=== Malaysia ===
The maritime boundaries between Indonesia and Malaysia are located four bodies of water, namely the Straits of Malacca, Straits of Singapore, South China Sea and Celebes Sea. The territorial seas of both countries (both claim a 12-nautical-mile (22 km) territorial sea) only meet in the Straits of Malacca and Straits of Singapore. Territorial sea boundaries also exist at the continuation of both ends of the land boundary between the two countries in Borneo. Only continental shelf boundaries have been agreed to in the South China Sea while the continental shelf boundary in the Celebes Sea has not been determined at all.

==== Straits of Malacca and Straits of Singapore ====
Continental shelf and territorial sea agreements

The continental shelf and territorial sea boundaries generally runs along the median line between the baselines of the two countries. Indonesia and Malaysia both agreed to a continental shelf boundary in 1969 (signed on 27 October 1969) and a territorial sea boundary in 1970 (signed on 17 March 1970). The two countries together with Thailand entered to an agreement on 21 December 1971 established a common maritime tripoint as well as extended the continental shelf boundary between Indonesia and Malaysia from the northern terminus defined in the 1969 agreement to meet the tripoint in a straight line (see table below).

Both the continental shelf boundary and territorial sea boundary generally follow the equidistant line between the baselines of the two countries. The continental shelf and territorial sea boundaries are generally one and the same line with the same turning points except for one turning point of the territorial sea boundary known as "Turning Point 6" which does not apply to Malaysia, with the Malaysian territorial sea boundary running directly from Turning Point 5 to Turning Point 7, which coincides with the continental shelf boundary as defined by the 1969 apgreement. This phenomenon creates a small triangle of sea in the southern part of the Straits of Malacca which forms part of the Indonesian continental shelf but not part of the country's territorial sea.

Malaysia's 1979 map

The continental shelf and territorial sea boundaries beyond the southern terminus of the 1969 and 1970 agreements have not been agreed to. The 1979 territorial sea and continental shelf map published by Malaysia shows a unilaterally drawn continental shelf/territorial sea boundary connecting the southern terminus of the 1969 continental shelf and 1970 territorial sea agreement between Indonesia and Malaysia with the Malaysia-Singapore border at the western entrance of the Straits of Johor. The boundary's southernmost turning point, namely Point 17, is inside Indonesia's baseline in the Riau Islands, giving the impression that Malaysia is claiming a slice of Indonesia's internal waters as part of its territorial sea. The boundaries on the 1979 map are not recognised by Indonesia nor Singapore.

The map also does not show the western Indonesia-Malaysia-Singapore tripoint, which should be located in this area. Indonesia and Singapore signed an agreement in 2009, extending their defined common boundary to a point where the two countries claim was as far westwards as they could go bilaterally. Tri-lateral negotiations would be necessary to define the tri-point and close the undefined boundary gaps.

Point	Longitude	Latitude	Remarks
Indonesia, Malaysia and Thailand common point
CP	98° 01.5'	5° 57.0'	The 1971 agreement establishing the common point also extends the boundary from Point 1 of the continental shelf boundary to the Common Point.
Continental shelf border end and turning point coordinates
1	98° 17.5'	5° 27.0'	
2	98° 41.5'	4° 55.7'	
3	99° 43.6'	3° 59.6'	
4	99° 55.0'	3° 47.4'	
5	101° 12.1'	2° 41.5'	
6	101° 46.5'	2° 15.4'	
7	102° 13.4'	1° 55.2'	
8	102° 35.0'	1° 41.2'	
9	103° 3.9'	1° 19.5'	
10	103° 22.8'	1° 15.0'	
Territorial sea border end and turning point coordinates
1	101° 00.2'	2° 51.6'	This point is located along the continental shelf boundary between Point 4 and 5.
2	101° 12.1'	2° 41.5'	Same as Point 5 of the continental shelf boundary
3	101° 46.5	2° 15.4'	Same as Point 6 of the continental shelf boundary
4	102° 13.4'	1° 55.2'	Same as Point 7 of the continental shelf boundary
5	102° 35.0'	1° 41.2'	Same as Point 8 of the continental shelf boundary
6	103° 2.1'	1° 19.1'	This point does not apply to Malaysia
7	103° 3.9'	1° 19.5'	Same as Point 9 of the continental shelf boundary
8	103° 22.8'	1° 15.0'	Same as Point 10 of the continental shelf boundary
Turning points along the continuation of Malaysia's maritime border according to the 1979 map
15	103° 22'.8	1° 15'.0	Same as Point 10 of the continental shelf boundary and Point 8 of the territorial sea boundary
16	103° 26'.8	1° 13'.45	
17	103° 32'.5	1° 1'.45	
18	103° 34'.2	1° 11'.0	This turning point may form part of the Malaysia-Singapore border
19	103° 34'.95	1° 15'.15	This turning point may form part of the Malaysia-Singapore border
20	103° 37'.38	1° 16'.37	This turning point may form part of the Malaysia-Singapore border
21	103° 24'.1	1° 15'.85	This turning point may form part of the Malaysia-Singapore border

==== South China Sea and Straits of Singapore (Eastern portion) ====
Continental shelf agreement

Only the continental shelf boundary has been determined between the two countries for this segment of their maritime border. The border follows the equidistant line between the baselines of Indonesia and Malaysia and Point 20 is the equidistant point between Indonesia, Malaysia and Vietnam (see table below). Point 20 is the western terminus of the Indonesia-Vietnam continental shelf boundary which the two countries agreed to in 2003 and the easternmost point of the area of overlapping claims between Malaysia and Vietnam.

The southern terminus of the continental shelf boundary lies to the east of Pedra Branca which was disputed between Malaysia and Singapore and eventually awarded to Singapore by an International Court of Justice ruling.

Malaysia's 1979 map

No maritime border agreement covers the continuation of the border from the southern terminus of the continental shelf boundary to the meeting point of the territorial water of Indonesia, Malaysia and Singapore which should lie in the area. Malaysia and Singapore have also yet to determine their mutual border from the eastern terminus of the Malaysia-Singapore Border which was as determined in the 1995 Malaysia-Singapore border agreement to the tripoint.

Malaysia's 1979 continental shelf and territorial sea map unilaterally connects the southern terminus of the Indonesia-Malaysia continental shelf boundary with the Malaysia-Singapore border at the eastern entrance of the Straits of Johor. The coordinates of the unilateral boundary in the chart below. The map places Pedra Branca, Middle Rocks and South Ledge inside Malaysia's territorial sea. Both Indonesia and Singapore do not recognise the borders drawn in the 1979 map.

The 2008 International Court of Justice decision on the sovereignty of Pedra Branca, Middle Rocks and South Ledge should enable the maritime borders between the three countries in this stretch of waters to be determined. Revision to the 1979 map will be needed with the awarding of Pedra Branca to Singapore and Middle Rocks to Malaysia by the ICJ. The sovereignty of South Ledge, which is submerged during high tide, will be determined later through the determination of territorial waters in which it is situated. While South Ledge lies closest to Middle Rocks and then Pedra Branca, the nearest shore to the marine feature is actually the northern shore of Indonesia's Bintan island.

Singapore has indicated that its border with Indonesia in this area will consist of two stretches - one between the main Singapore island and Indonesia's Batam island, and the other between Singapore's Pedra Branca and Indonesia's Bintan Island. A stretch of the Indonesia–Malaysia border will run in between. This will effectively establish three Indonesia-Malaysia-Singapore tripoints in the area. The determination of boundaries to fill the various gaps and defining the various tripoints would require Indonesia-Malaysia-Singapore trilateral negotiations.

Point	Longitude (E)	Latitude (N)	Remarks
Continental shelf boundary end and turning point coordinates
11	104° 29'.5	1° 23'.9	
12	104° 53'	1° 38'	
13	105° 5'.2	1° 54'.4	
14	105° 1'.2	2° 22'.5	
15	104° 51'.5	2° 22'.5	
16	104° 46'.5	3° 50'.1	
17	104° 51'.9	4° 3'	
18	105° 28'.8	5° 4'.7	
19	105° 47'.1	5° 40'.6	
20	105° 49'.2	6° 5'.8	This point is also the western terminus of the Indonesia-Vietnam continental shelf boundary; the easternmost point of the area of Malaysia-Vietnam overlapping claims.
Turning point coordinates along the continuation of Malaysia's maritime border according to the 1979 map
22	104° 7'.5	1° 17'.63	This turning point may form part of the Malaysia-Singapore border
23	104° 2'.5	1° 17'.42	This turning point may form part of the Malaysia-Singapore border
24	104° 4'.6	1° 17'.3	This turning point may form part of the Malaysia-Singapore border
25	104° 7'.1	1° 16'.2	This turning point may form part of the Malaysia-Singapore border
26	104° 7'.42	1° 15'.65	This turning point may form part of the Malaysia-Singapore border
27	104° 12'.67	1° 13'.65	This turning point may form part of the Malaysia-Singapore border
28	104° 16'.15	1° 16'.2	This turning point may form part of the Malaysia-Singapore border
29	104° 19'.8	1° 16'.5	This turning point may form part of the Malaysia-Singapore border
30	104° 29'.45	1° 15'.55	This turning point may form part of the Malaysia-Singapore border
31	104° 29'.33	1° 16'.95	This turning point may form part of the Malaysia-Singapore border
32	104° 29'.5	1° 23'.9	This point is the same as Point 11 (southern terminus) of the 1969 Indonesia-Malaysia continental shelf boundary

==== South China Sea (Off the western extremity of Sarawak) ====
Again, the only a continental shelf boundary has been agreed to in this segment of the maritime border between the two countries. The boundary begins at Point 21 with coordinates 109° 38'.8E 02° 05'.0 N (109° 38' 48" E 02° 05' N) off Tanjung Datu at the western extremity of the Malaysia state of Sarawak. Incidentally, the Indonesian baseline at Tanjung Datu is located at 109° 38' 43" E 02° 05' 10" N.

From this point, the border proceeds in a general northerly direction to Point 25 at 109° 38'.6 E 06° 18'.2 N which is at the 100 fathom point or the edge of the continental shelf.

Point 25 is also the eastern terminus of the Indonesia-Vietnam continental shelf boundary which was agreed to by the two countries in 2003, making it the common tripoint of Indonesia, Malaysia and Vietnam. This is also the western terminus of the Malaysian continental shelf boundary in South China Sea as asserted in the country's 1979 territorial sea and continental shelf boundary map. The boundary is however not recognised by any other country.

Point	Longitude (E)	Latitude (N)	Remarks
Continental shelf boundary end and turning point coordinates
21	109° 38'.8'	2° 5'	
22	109° 54'.5	3° 0'	
23	110° 2'.0	4° 40'.0	
24	109° 59'.0	5° 31'.2	
25	109° 38'.6	6° 18'.2	This is also the eastern terminus of the Indonesia-Vietnam continental shelf boundary agreed to in 2003; western terminus of Malaysia's continental shelf boundary (South China Sea segment off the coast of Borneo) as in its 1979 map

==== Celebes Sea ====
There is no agreement over the maritime boundary in this segment. The 1979 continental shelf and territorial sea map by Malaysia depicts Malaysia's territorial sea and continental shelf border running southeast from the easternmost point of the land boundary between the two countries at 4° 10' North. Indonesia does not recognise the borders of the map and claims part of the continental shelf, calling it Ambalat (see below).

The map also puts the islands of Sipadan and Ligitan within Malaysian territorial waters. Indonesia initially rejected the assertion that the islands belonged to Malaysia and both countries brought the dispute to the International Court of Justice. In 2002, the court decided that the sovereignty of the two islands belonged to Malaysia. The court however did not determine the maritime boundary in the surrounding waters and specifically decided that the 4° 10' North parallel which marked the easternmost portion of the Indonesia-Malaysia land border in Sebatik island did not extend to sea to form either the territorial sea or continental shelf border.

Point	Longitude (E)	Latitude (N)	Remarks
Malaysia's continental shelf claim according to the 1979 map
76	120° 00'	4° 23'	This point is deemed to be the tri-point of Indonesia, Malaysia and the Philippines
77	120° 15'.75	3° 02'.75	
78	119° 53'	3° 01'.5	
79	118° 57'.5	3° 06'	
80	118° 46'.17	3° 08'.67	
81	118° 22'	3° 39'	
82	118° 01'.1	4° 03'.65	
83	117° 56'.95	4° 08'	
84	117° 53'.97	4° 10'	This point is on the eastern terminus of the land boundary

=== Philippines ===
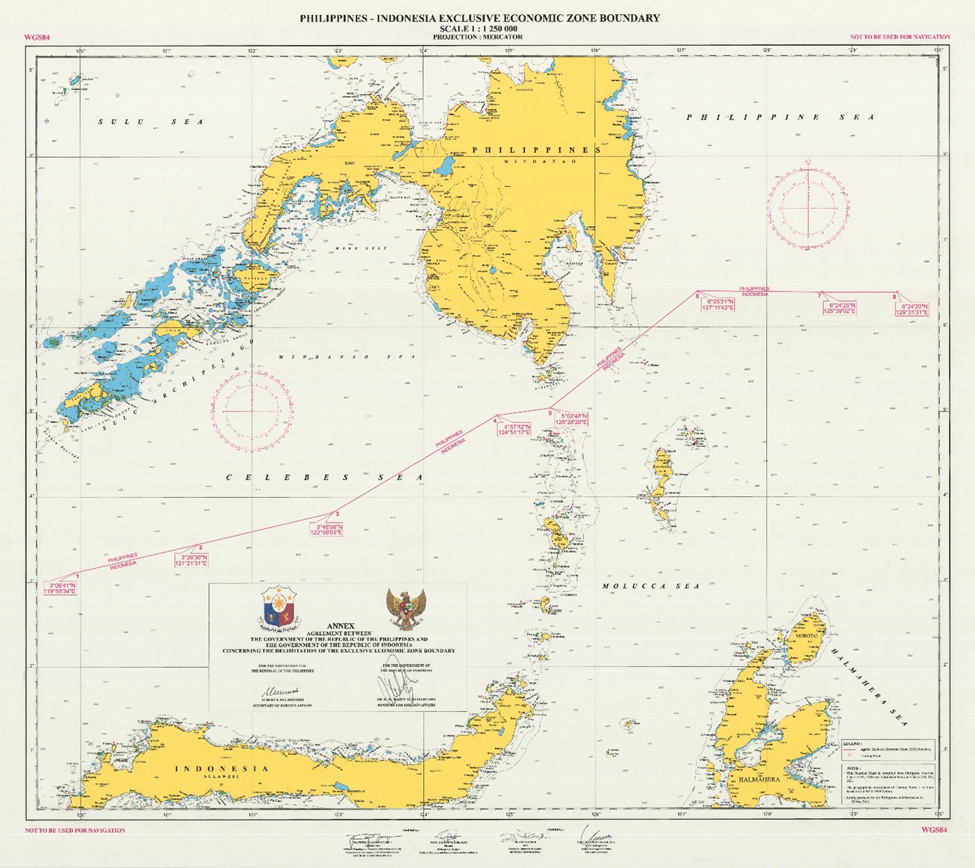
Indonesia and Philippines Exclusive Economic Zone Boundary

The border between Indonesia and the Philippines consists of maritime boundary mainly on the Celebes Sea that separates the two Southeast Asian countries as defined through a pact that was signed by both parties in 2014. The border is also the Exclusive economic zone (EEZ) boundary between Indonesia and the Philippines, which is delimited through eight geographic coordinate points. It has a length of 1,162.2 kilometres (627.5 nautical miles; 722.2 miles) dividing across the Celebes Sea to the Philippine Sea. The following table shows the geographical coordinates points as defined in the Philippine and Indonesian agreement on the Exclusive Economic Zone boundary that was signed in 2014.

Point	Longitude (E)	Latitude (N)
1	119° 55' 34"	3° 06' 41"
2	121° 21' 31"	3° 26' 36"
3	122° 56' 03"	3° 48' 58"
4	124° 51'.17"	4° 57' 42"
5	125° 28' 20"	5° 02' 48"
6	127° 11' 42"	6° 25' 21"
7	128° 32'.02"	6° 24' 25"
8	129° 31' 31"	6° 24' 20"

=== Singapore ===
==== Agreements ====
The Agreement Stipulating the Territorial Sea Boundary Lines between Indonesia and the Republic of Singapore in the Strait of Singapore signed by Indonesia and Singapore on 25 May 1973 determines the common territorial sea border as a series of straight lines connecting six coordinate points located in the Straits of Singapore. Indonesia ratified the agreement on 3 December 1973 while Singapore ratified the agreement on 29 August 1974.

The distance of the border is 24.55 nautical miles (45.47 km). Three of the six coordinates lie equidistant from Indonesian and Singaporean shores while the remaining are negotiated points with two lying closer to the Indonesian shores. Point 2 lies towards the landward side of Indonesia's baseline.

On 10 March 2009, Indonesia and Singapore signed the Treaty between the Republic of Indonesia and the Republic of Singapore Relating to the Delimitation of the Territorial Seas of the Two Countries in the Western Part of the Strait of Singapore 2009 in Jakarta. The treaty, signed by their respective Foreign Ministers at that time, namely Hassan Wirajuda and George Yeo, extended the delimitation of their common maritime boundary by a further 12.1 km westwards from Point 1 determined in the 1973 agreement, to Point 1C. The treaty came into force upon ratification through an exchange of Instruments of Ratification on 31 August 2010 in Singapore by then Indonesian Foreign Minister Marty Natalegawa and his Singaporean counterpart George Yeo.

The new western end-point Point 1C is deemed to be located near but is not the tri-point for Indonesia, Malaysia and Singapore and tri-lateral negotiations will be further needed to determine where the maritime boundaries of the three countries meet.

The 2009 extension uses the basepoints of Pulau Nipah in Indonesia and Singapore's Sultan Shoal, which has virtually been surrounded by reclaimed land. This is significant in legal terms as it indicated that Singapore was willing to not assert the use of the shores of reclaimed land as its baseline. Also significant for Indonesia is that its basepoints, of which Pulau Nipah is one, together with the baselines which were drawn according to the archipelagic baseline principle, were recognised by Singapore.

The three coordinates under the 2009 treaty are based on the World Geodetic System 1984 (WGS'84).

Point	Latitude (N)	Longitude (E)	Remarks
Territorial sea boundary end and turning point coordinates under 2009 treaty
1C	1° 11' 43.8"	103° 34' 00.0"	
1B	1° 11' 55.5"	103° 34' 20.4"	
1A	1° 11' 17.4"	103° 39' 38.5"	
Territorial sea boundary end and turning point coordinates under 1973 agreement
1	1° 10' 46"	103° 40' 14.6"	
2	1° 7' 49.3"	103° 44' 26.5"	
3	1° 10' 17.2"	103° 48' 18.0"	
4	1° 11' 45.5"	103° 51' 35.4"	
5	1° 12' 26.1"	103° 52' 50.7"	
6	1° 16' 10.2"	104° 2' 00.0"	

==== Undefined border ====
With the signing of the 2009 maritime boundary agreement, the delimitation of the "western segment" of the Indonesia-Singapore boundary was deemed completed, save for the gap between the new western end point and the eventual western tri-point of the boundaries of Indonesia, Malaysia and Singapore. This final gap will require trilateral negotiations among the three countries which are not expected to take place soon as it is dependent on the delimitation of the Indonesia-Malaysia maritime boundary in the southern portion of the Straits of Malacca, as well as the delimitation of the remaining portion of the Malaysia-Singapore border in the western part of the Straits of Singapore.

The remaining portion of the undefined boundary is called the "eastern segment" as it lies to the east of the boundary delimited by the 1973 agreement, in the eastern portion of the Straits of Singapore between Singapore and Indonesia's Riau Islands. Singapore has indicated that this segment would be made up of two portions. The first, between Singapore island off the Changi Coast and Indonesia's Batam island, will run from the eastern terminus determined in the 1973 agreement to an Indonesia-Malaysia-Singapore tri-point. Another portion will be located further east between Pedra Branca, which the International Court of Justice awarded to Singapore in 2008 in a dispute with Malaysia, and Indonesia's Bintan island. A stretch of the Indonesia-Malaysia border will lie in between the two portions. Tri-lateral negotiations among Indonesia, Malaysia and Singapore would be needed to determine the three tri-points.

The signing of the 2009 treaty has given momentum for talks to determine the eastern segment to begin. During a press conference after the exchange of the Instruments of Ratification for the 2009 treaty, Singaporean Foreign Minister George Yeo said Indonesia and Singapore were going to begin the process of demarcating the portion of their common border between Singapore and Batam.

The solving of the sovereignty dispute between Malaysia and Singapore over Pedra Branca, Middle Rocks and South Ledge has also resulted in Malaysia and Singapore starting technical negotiations to determine their common border, which is necessary before the tripoints can be determined.

=== Thailand ===
Four boundary delimitation agreements are the Indonesia-Thailand continental shelf boundary delimitation agreement of 17 December 1971; the Indonesia-Malaysia-Thailand tripartite continental shelf boundary delimitation agreement of 21 December 1971; the Indonesia-Thailand sea-bed boundary delimitation agreement on 11 December 1975; and the India-Indonesia-Thailand trijunction and related boundaries tripartite agreement of 22 June 1978.

- The first of the four agreements is the "Agreement between the Government of the Kingdom of Thailand and the Government of the Republic of Indonesia relating to the Delimitation of a Continental Shelf Boundary between the two Countries in the Northern Part of the Straits of Malacca and in the Andaman Sea" signed on 17 December 1971 in Bangkok which determined the common boundary between the two countries as a straight line between Point 1 and Point 2 (see table below). The agreement, which came into force on 16 July 1973, also extended the common boundary from Point 1 to the Indonesia-Malaysia-Thailand common tripoint which had earlier been established via a Memorandum of Understanding signed on 15 October 1970.
- The common tripoint (listed as CP in the table below) was legally established by the three countries four days later on 21 December 1971 when they signed the tripartite "Agreement between the Government of the Republic of Indonesia, The Government of Malaysia and the Government of the Kingdom of Thailand Relating to the Delimitation of the Continental Shelf Boundaries in the Northern Part of the Strait of Malacca" in Kuala Lumpur. This agreement, which also came into force on 16 July 1973, reiterated the common boundary as extending in straight lines running from the Common Point 2 via Point 1.
- In Jakarta on 11 December 1975, Indonesia and Thailand signed the "Agreement between the Government of the Republic of Indonesia and the Government of the Kingdom of Thailand relating to the delimitation of the sea-bed boundary between the two countries in the Andaman Sea." This agreement extends the common boundary from Point 2, renamed Point A in the agreement, in a northwesterly direction to Point L.
- Point L was located just short of the common tripoint for India, Indonesia and Thailand (Point T in table below) which was subsequently established in the "Agreement between the Government of the Kingdom of Thailand, the Government of the Republic of India and the Government of the Republic of Indonesia concerning the determination of the trijunction point and the delimitation of the related boundaries of the three countries in the Andaman Sea" which was signed on 22 June 1978 in New Delhi. The tripartite agreement, which entered into force on 2 March 1979, also extended the Indonesia-Thailand boundary from Point L to the trijunction Point T.

The coordinates of end and turning-points of the border are as follows:-

Point	Latitude (N)	Longitude (E)	Remarks
Trijunction and related boundaries under the 1978 India-Indonesia-Thailand tripartite agreement
Trijunction	07° 47' 00"	95° 31' 48"	The boundary runs as a straight line from the trijunction to Point L below
Sea-bed boundary end and turning points under 1975 Indonesia-Thailand agreement
L	07° 46' 06"	95° 33' 06"	
A	07° 05' 48"	96° 36' 30"	This point is also called Point 2 under the 1971 Indonesia-Thailand agreement
Continental shelf boundary end and turning points under 1971 Indonesia-Thailand agreement
2	07° 05' 48"	96° 36' 30"	This point is also called Point A under the 1975 Indonesia-Thailand agreement
1	06° 21' 48"	97° 54' 00"	
Continental shelf boundary end and turning points under 1971 Indonesia-Malaysia-Thailand agreement
CP	5° 57' 00"	103° 44' 26.5"	

=== Vietnam ===
The Agreement between the Government of the Republic of Indonesia and the Government of the Socialist Republic of Vietnam concerning the delimitation of the Continental Shelf Boundary was signed on 26 June 2003 in Hanoi, Vietnam, by Indonesia's Foreign Minister Hasan Wirajuda and his Vietnamese counterpart Nguyen Dy Nien.

The agreement defined the continental shelf boundary of the two countries as the imaginary straight line located between the two terminal points - namely Point 20 and Point 25 - of the 1969 continental shelf agreement between Indonesia and Malaysia with four turning points in between.

Point	Longitude (E)	Latitude (N)	Remarks
Continental shelf boundary end and turning point coordinates
20	105° 49' 12"	6° 5' 48"	This is the northern terminus of the Indonesia-Malaysia continental shelf boundary (off the East Coast of Peninsula Malaysia segment) agreed to in 1969; easternmost point of the Malaysia-Vietnam area of overlapping claims
H	106° 12'	6° 15'	
H1	106° 19' 01"	6° 15'	
A4	106° 39' 37.67"	6° 20' 59.88"	
X1	109° 17' 13"	6° 50' 15"	
25	109° 38' 36"	6° 18' 12"	This is also the northern terminus of the Indonesia-Malaysia continental shelf boundary (off the northwest coast of Borneo segment) agreed to in 1969; western terminus of Malaysia's continental shelf off the coast of Borneo as asserted in its 1979 map

== Disputes ==
=== Land boundary disputes ===
Despite the 1915 boundary agreement, there are at least nine areas where the two countries have outstanding disputes over the location of the land boundary. The comprise five locations along the boundary between Indonesia's North Kalimantan province and Malaysia's Sabah state, and four locations between Indonesia's West Kalimantan province and Malaysia's Sarawak state.

The locations along the Sabah-North Kalimantan boundary that are being disputed are at Sungai Sinapat, Sungai Sesai, Sungai Simantipal, B2700-B3100 (near Sungai Sinapat and Sungai Sesai) and C200-C700 on Pulau Sebatik.

On the Sarawak-West Kalimantan boundary, the four locations with outstanding boundary problems are named as Batu Aum, Sungai Buan, Gunung Raya and D400.

Certain parties regard Tanjung Datu as a fifth location of dispute. At the location, 1,400 hectare area known as Camar Bulan was recognised to be Malaysian territory after a survey done in 1976 to determine the location of the watershed, resulting in a memorandum of understanding in 1978. This decision however, had not gone down well with certain quarters in Indonesia. Nevertheless, there is a dispute of maritime territory off the coast of Tanjung Datu (see below).

=== Maritime boundary disputes ===
The main maritime disputes between Indonesia and Malaysia have occurred in the Celebes Sea. Both countries previously claimed sovereignty over the Ligitan and Sipadan islands. The dispute over the Ambalat block of the Celebes Sea seabed, believed to be rich in mineral resources, continues. There is also a section of the maritime boundary off Tanjung Datu at the western end of the land boundary which is being disputed between the two countries.

==== Ligitan and Sipadan ====
Ligitan and Sipadan are two small islands just off the east coast of Borneo which were claimed by Indonesia and Malaysia. The dispute originated in 1969 when the two countries negotiated to delimit the common border of their continental shelf. As the two countries could not agree on the sovereignty of the two islands, the continental shelf border was left off the 1969 agreement between the two countries.

Indonesia claimed that the islands were theirs by virtue of the fact that they were located south of 4° 10" North which it said formed the maritime border between it and Malaysia by virtue of a straight line extension of the land border which ended on the east coast Sebatik island. Malaysia however, claimed a stretch of territorial waters and the continental shelf south of the latitude which included the two islands. The claim was confirmed through its map which it published in 1979. Indonesia protested the delimitation on the map.

The dispute was brought before the International Court of Justice and on 17 December 2002, decided that sovereignty of Sipadan and Ligitan belonged to Malaysia on the basis of effectivités. It however did not decide on the question of territorial waters and maritime borders. This allowed the dispute over territorial waters and continental shelf to remain unresolved. The dispute over the Ambalat block (see below) can be seen to be part of this dispute over territorial waters and continental shelf.

==== Ambalat ====
Ambalat is an area of the seabed or continental shelf in the Celebes Sea off the east coast of Borneo which is claimed by Indonesia and Malaysia. The seabed is believed to be rich in crude oil. Contrary to popular belief, the International Court of Justice decision over the sovereignty of Sipadan and Ligitan did not solve the dispute over Ambalat as it did not include issues concerning the demarcation of the territorial sea and continental shelf boundaries of the two countries in the area.

The dispute started with Malaysia issuing a map in 1979 of its territorial sea and continental shelf which included the Ambalat block. The map drew Malaysia's maritime boundary in a southeast direction into the Celebes Sea after it leaves the eastmost point on land on Sebatik island. This would include the Ambalat block, or a large part of it, within the Malaysian continental shelf. Indonesia has, like the other neighbours of Malaysia, objected to the map. Indonesia has never officially announced the exact locations of its maritime boundaries but claimed during its arguments in the Sipadan Case that it continued in a straight line along the 4° 10' North latitude after it leaves Sebatik.

Both countries have also awarded exploration contracts to oil companies for the area. Indonesia has awarded concessions to ENI of Italy for what it called the Ambalat Block in 1999 and US company Unocal for East Ambalat in 2004. Petronas, the Malaysian petroleum company, meanwhile awarded a concession over what Malaysia called Block ND 6 and ND 7 in February 2005. A large part of Ambalat overlaps with Block ND 6 while a huge portion of East Ambalat overlaps with Block ND 7.

The dispute has created considerable tension between the two countries, with several facing-off incidents between the navy ships of both countries. The latest round of tension occurred at the end of May 2009 when Indonesian media reports stated that Indonesian navy ships were close to firing shots at a Malaysian navy vessel which it claimed had encroached deep into Indonesian territorial waters. Negotiations are currently on-going to resolve the dispute, although media reports say no talks have been held since April 2008.

==== South China Sea ====
Parts of China's nine-dash line overlap Indonesia's exclusive economic zone near the Natuna islands. Indonesia believes China's claim over parts of the Natuna islands has no legal basis. In November 2015, Indonesia's security chief Luhut Panjaitan said Indonesia could take China before an international court if Beijing's claim to the majority of the South China Sea and part of Indonesian territory is not resolved through dialogue.

The Philippines, Vietnam, Malaysia, Brunei and Indonesia have all officially protested over the use of such a line.
