= Indonesia–Vietnam relations =

- Indonesia: Vietnam

Diplomatic mission
- Embassy of Indonesia, Hanoi: Embassy of Vietnam, Jakarta

Envoy
- Ambassador Adam Mulawarman Tugio: Ambassador Ta Van Thông

Indonesia and Vietnam established diplomatic relations in 1955. Indonesia has an embassy in Hanoi and a consulate general in Ho Chi Minh City while Vietnam has an embassy in Jakarta. Both are neighboring nations that have a maritime border which lies on the South China Sea and are members of ASEAN and APEC.

== History ==
=== Colonial era ===
The relations between ancient Indonesia and Vietnam, particularly Southern Vietnam, began around the 7th century, since the era of the Champa, Srivijaya, and later Majapahit kingdoms. In mid-11th century, Vietnamese king Ly Thanh Tong (r. 1054–1071) was said to have purchased a precious pearl from a Javanese merchant. A Majapahit epic poem called Nagarakretagama mentioned several states that is today Vietnam: Champa and Yawana (Đại Việt). Indonesian 15th century records mentioned Princess Darawati, a Cham princess, married to King Kertawijaya, Majapahit's seventh ruler.

Indonesia was ruled by the Dutch led by King Willem III in the 19th century, Napoleon III, Emperor of the French began to establish control of Cochinchina in 1862 as the city of Saigon becomes its capital of both Cochinchina and later becoming French Indochina until 1902, when the capital was moved to Hanoi. During the Second World War, both Indonesia and Vietnam are fighting not just the Japanese, but also the French and the Dutch between the August Revolution and the Indonesian War of Independence which led the unconditional surrender of Japan following the two atomic bombs of Hiroshima and Nagasaki in Japan. The emperor Bảo Đại was abdicated as the war came to an end. Indonesia declared independence from the Dutch on 17 August 1945, followed by the Vietnamese on 2 September 1945 from French rule. One year after the proclamation of the Democratic Republic of Vietnam, the Marxist-Leninist leader Ho Chi Minh to declare war on the French as the Indochina War. The Vietnam War lasted for over 30 years until the Fall of Saigon to Viet Cong forces on 30 April 1975.

=== Post-independence ===
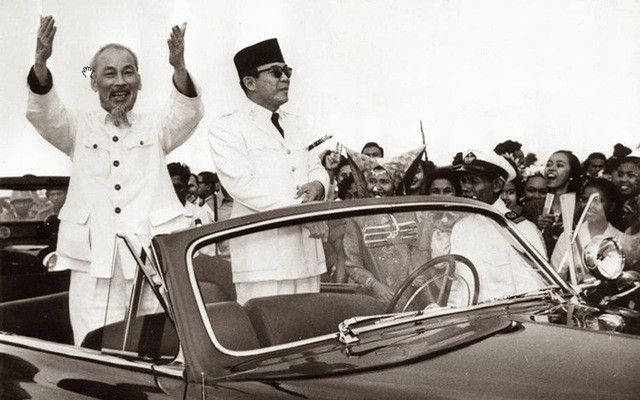
President Ho Chi Minh visited Jakarta, Indonesia in 1959

While informal diplomatic relations originated in the 1940s, formal diplomatic ties was only established following the 1955 Bandung Conference. Indonesia established consulate-generals in Hanoi and Saigon on December and September of that year. However, the higher diplomatic authority was centralized in Hanoi post under led by Mr. Soedibjo Wirjowerdojo as H.E Consul General as extraordinary and plenipotentiary trusted appointee by President Sukarno. While initially keeping neutral between the North and South parties, Indonesia's government under Sukarno grew to favor the communist North Vietnam. Ho Chi Minh visited Indonesia in 1959 and Sukarno visited back the following year. Eventually, on 10 August 1964 an embassy was established in Hanoi, which resulted in severance of diplomatic ties with South Vietnam and closure of the Saigon consulate. This embassy was maintained even as Suharto took power. On 28 July 1995, Vietnam became the seventh member of ASEAN. The bilateral cooperation through ASEAN has been promoted ever since.

== High level visits ==
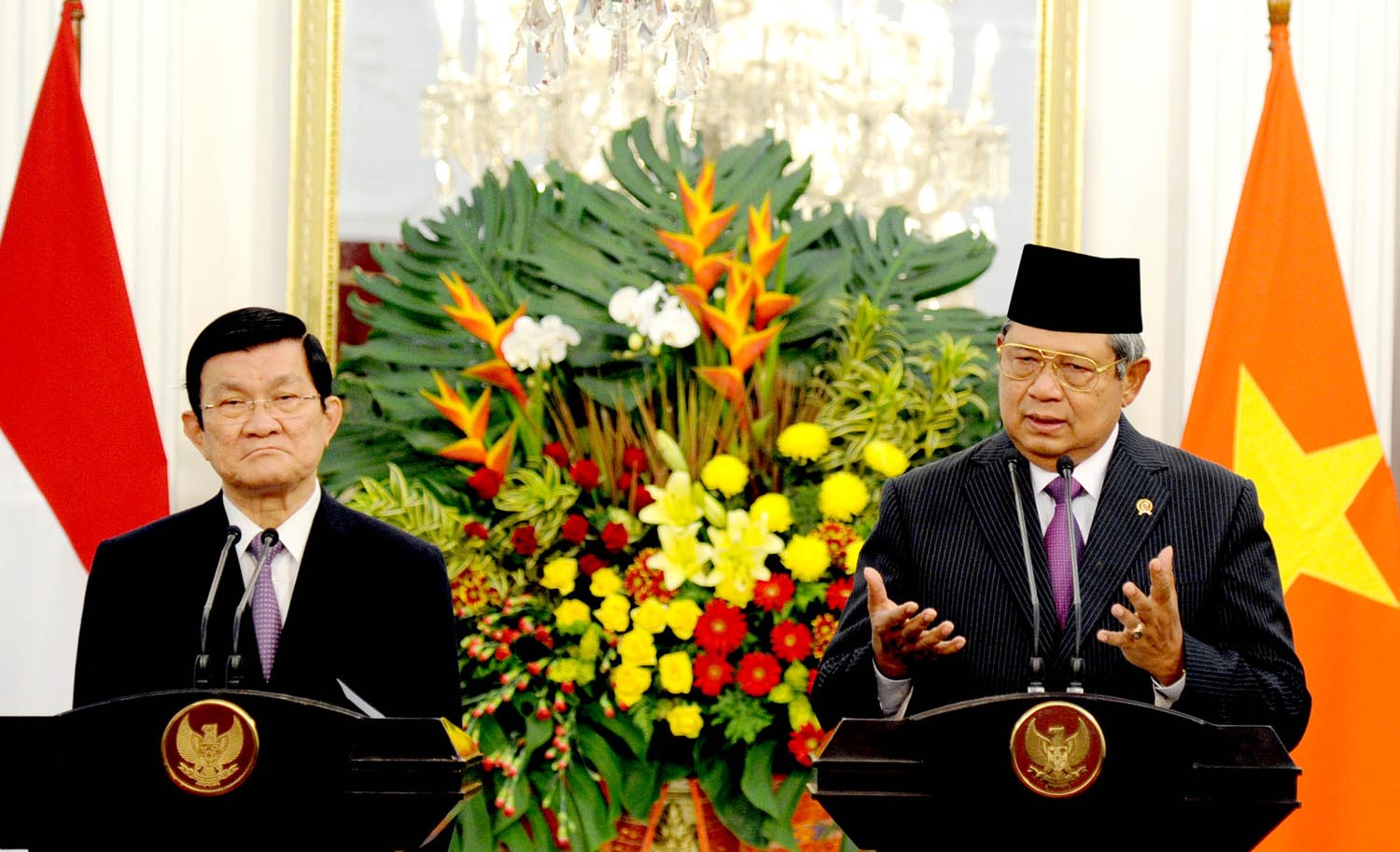
President Yudhoyono and President Truong Tan Sang in Merdeka Palace, Jakarta, June 27th, 2013.

In February 1959, North Vietnamese President Ho Chi Minh visited Indonesia, reciprocated by President Sukarno visit to North Vietnam in June on the same year. In November 1990 President Suharto visited Vietnam. In April 1994 President Lê Đức Anh visited Indonesia. Indonesian President Megawati Sukarnoputri visited Hanoi on 22 August 2001, and also in June 2003, reciprocated by President Trần Đức Lương visit to Jakarta in November 2001. Indonesian President Susilo Bambang Yudhoyono visited Hanoi on 28 May 2005. On 27 June 2013, Vietnamese President Trương Tấn Sang visited Indonesia and paid a courtesy call to his Indonesian counterpart, Susilo Bambang Yudhoyono, to strengthen bilateral relations and deepen cooperation in key sectors, as well as agreeing to establish a strategic partnership. in December 2022, Vietnamese President Nguyễn Xuân Phúc visit Indonesia to deepen cooperation and finalize the demarcation on both of the Maritime Borders.

== Tourism ==
In 2016, about 50,000 Vietnamese tourists visited Indonesia, with 70,000 Indonesians coming to Vietnam.

== Territorial disputes ==
Indonesia and Vietnam currently do not have territorial disputes. However, addressing the territorial disputes in the South China Sea, Indonesia supports and urges ASEAN nations (including Vietnam and the Philippines) to unite and reaffirm the Declaration on the Conduct (DOC) of parties involved, the need to reaffirm the guidelines, Code of Conduct (COC) in the East Sea (South China Sea), and the need to respect international laws and the United Nations Convention on the Law of the Sea (UNCLOS).

In more recent years, Vietnamese fishing vessels captured for allegedly fishing in the Indonesian Exclusive Economic Zone have been sunk, with 96 ships being sunk throughout 2016, making it the most compared to other countries. The Indonesian President expressed his desire to resolve EEZ issues to his Vietnamese counterpart during the 2017 G20 Hamburg summit, of which Vietnam was a guest.

In late 2022, during the state visit of Vietnamese President Nguyễn Xuân Phúc to Indonesia, the two nations' heads of state have announced that the two parties have concluded negotiations relate to the demarcation of EEZ boundaries. Even though the formal agreement is yet to be signed, it is expected to effectively end Vietnam and Indonesia's concerns & clashes in the area and encourage both countries to be more united to deal with China's aggression in the South China Sea.

== See also ==
- Indonesia–Vietnam border
