= Malaysia–Thailand joint development area =

Natural resource field between Malaysia and Thailand

The Malaysia–Thailand Joint Development Area is a 7,250 km square area in the Gulf of Thailand which was created as an interim measure to exploit the natural resources in the seabed or continental shelf claimed by the two countries and to share the proceeds equally. The arrangement does not extinguish the legal right to claims by both countries over the area. This is one of the first applications of the joint development a memorandum of understanding on 21 February 1979 in Chiang Mai, Thailand for the establishment of the joint development area and authority to administer the area. This was followed by an agreement to constitute the joint development authority on 30 May 1990 in Kuala Lumpur, Malaysia.

As of the end of 2007, approximately 8.5 trillion standard cubic feet of gas reserves (proved and probable) from twenty two fields in the area have been discovered. Gas production from the Cakerawala gas field began on 2 January 2005.

== The area ==
The joint development area basically coincides with the area of overlapping claim of the continental shelf by the two countries. The western and north-eastern boundaries of the JDA is that of Malaysia's continental shelf claim as asserted in its 1979 map issued by the country's Survey and Mapping Department. The southern boundary coincides with Thailand's exclusive economic zone boundary as proclaimed in 1988.

A portion of the joint development area is also claimed by Vietnam and is known as the Tripartite Overlapping Claim Area. The three countries have agreed to utilise the joint development formula for the exploitation of resources in the area but no further developments have been reported so far.

Point	Latitude (N)	Longitude (E)	Remarks
Joint Development Area turning points
A	6° 50'.0	102° 21'.2	Northern terminus of agreed continental shelf border; Point 45 on Malaysia's 1979 map; Point 4 of Thailand's EEZ border
B	7° 10'.25	102° 29'.0	Same as Point 44 on Malaysia's 1979 map
C	7° 48'.0	103° 02'.5	Same as Point 43 on Malaysia's 1979 map
D	7° 22'.0	103° 42'.5	Same as Point 8 of Thailand's EEZ border; located on Malaysia's continental shelf boundary between Point 43 and Point 42 in the 1979 map.
E	7° 20'.0	103° 39'.0	Same as Point 7 of Thailand's EEZ border
F	7° 03'.0	103° 06'.0	Same as Point 6 of Thailand's EEZ border
G	6° 53'.0	102° 34'.0	Same as Point 5 of Thailand's EEZ border
Boundary coordinates of area within the joint development area claimed by Malaysia, Thailand and Vietnam
1	7° 48'.0	103° 02'.5	Same as Point C of the Malaysia–Thailand JDA boundary; Point 43 on Malaysia's 1979 map; and Point C (eastern terminus) of the agreed Thailand–Vietnam continental shelf boundary.
2	7° 22'.0	103° 42'.5	Same as Point D of the Malaysia–Thailand JDA
3	7° 20'.0	103° 39'.0	Same as Point E of the Malaysia–Thailand JDA; same as Point B of the Malaysia–Vietnam joint development defined area boundary.
4	7° 18'.31	103° 35'.71	Located along the south-eastern border of the Malaysia–Thailand JDA between Point E and Point F; same as Point C of the Malaysia–Vietnam joint development defined area boundary. The boundary then continues back to Point 1.

Malaysia's continental shelf limit claim is from Point A to Point C via Point B and thence to Point G while Thailand's Exclusive Economic Zone claim limit is from Point A to Point G through Points D, E, and F. It has not delimited its continental shelf limits beyond Point G.

== Exploration, development and production ==
=== Exploration ===
The joint development area was originally divided into three blocks for exploration. They are Blocks A-18 (middle portion of the JDA), B-17 (northern portion) and C-19 (southern portion). On 21 April 1994, two production sharing contracts (PSC) were awarded by the Malaysia–Thailand Joint Authority (MTJA) to two groups of contractors. Each group of contractors also formed operating companies for exploration. They were:

Block A-18:
- Contractors: PC JDA Ltd (50% share in the contract), Hess Oil Company of Thailand (JDA) Ltd (49.5%) and Hess Oil Company of Thailand Inc (0.5%)
- Operator: Carigali Hess Operating Company Sdn Bhd

Blocks B-17 and C-19
- Contractors: PTTEP International Limited (50%), PC JDA Ltd (50%)
- Operator: Carigali-PTTEPI Operating Company Sdn Bhd (CPOC)

PC JDA LLtd is a wholly owned subsidiary company of Petronas Carigali Sdn. Bhd. while PTTEP International Ltd is a wholly owned subsidiary company of PTT Exploration and Production Public Company Limited.

The period for exploration ended on 20 April 2002 and the above contractors retained the gas fields holding areas in their respective blocks but had to relinquish the areas not deemed as gas fields holding areas back to the MTJA. The relinquished areas of the JDA (approximately 3,475 km square) was made into a new block named Block B-17-01. A PSC was signed on 30 September 2004 for the contractors for the new block. They are:

Block B-17-01:
- Contractors: PTTEP International Ltd (50%), PC JDA Ltd (50%)
- Operator: Carigali-PTTEPI Operating Company Sdn Bhd (CPOC)

Between 1994 and 2007, a total of 59 exploration and appraisal wells were drilled in the JDA. Thirty-seven wells were located in Block A-18 and 22 in Block B-17. Another three exploratory wells were drilled in the new Block B-17-01.

=== Production ===
Twenty two gas fields have been declared in the JDA. As of the end of 2007, approximately 8.5 trillion standard cubic feet of proved and probable gas reserves have been discovered in the 22 fields. Some of these fields also have minor oil accumulations. The fields are:

Block A-18 (nine fields):
- Cakerawala
- Bulan
- Suriya
- Bumi
- Bumi East
- Senja
- Samudra
- Wira, and
- Samudra North
Block B-17 (10 fields):
- Muda
- Tapi
- Jengka
- Amarit
- Mali
- Jengka South
- Jengka West
- Jengka East, and
- Muda South
Block B-17-01 (three fields):
- Tanjung
- Jinda, and
- Andalas

The main production complex in Block A-18 is the Cakerawala Production Complex which is located at the Cakerawala gas field. It was completed in May 2002 and production began with 19 wells (14 wells on Cakerawala A platform and 5 wells on Cakerawala B platform) on 2 January 2005. Seven wells were later developed on Cakerawala. The initial contracted production level under Phase One was 390 million cubic feet per day (11,000,000 m^{3}/d).

In 2006, Phase Two commenced with the development of the Bumi, Suriya and Bulan fields as well as the expansion of Cakerawala C to sustain an additional contracted production level of 400 million cubic feet per day (11,000,000 m^{3}/d). The gas is piped to a receiving facility in Songkhla, Thailand and then piped to Malaysia where it feeds into the Peninsula Gas Utilisation system. An additional 5 wells were drilled on Cakerawala C, while 11 wells were drilled on Bumi A and seven wells on Suriya A. Drilling is still in progress in Bulan A. The additional gas is to be consumed by Thailand.

Construction for the production complex in Block B-17 is in progress and production is expected to begin in October 2009. An initial contract production level of 270 million cubic feet per day (7,600,000 m^{3}/d) has been signed. The gas is to be consumed by Thailand.

== Administering the area ==
=== The joint authority ===
The joint development area is administered by the Malaysia-Thailand Joint Authority on behalf of the two governments. The authority is recognised as a statutory body in both countries and is given full rights to exploit and develop non-living natural resources in the joint development area. The authority was created in 1991 and has its headquarters in Kuala Lumpur, Malaysia.

=== MTJA Members ===
The authority is governed by MTJA Members consisting of equal representatives of Malaysian and Thai nationals (seven from each side) as appointed by the respective Governments. Under the supervision of authority's board, the MTJA management consists of staff covering technical, legal and financial aspects of the petroleum business.

The MTJA Members:

Co-chairmen: Abu Talib Othman (Malaysia), Sivavong Changkasiri (Thailand)

Members: Mohd Hassan Marican (President/Chief Executive Officer Petronas, Malaysia), Pornchai Rujiprapa (Permanent-Secretary, Ministry of Energy, Thailand), Dr Sulaiman Mahbob (Director-General, Economic Planning Unit, Prime Minister's Department, Malaysia), Admiral Werapon Waranon (Commander-in-Chief, Royal Thai Navy, Thailand), Dr Halim Man (Secretary-General, Ministry of Energy, Water and Telecommunications, Malaysia), Porntip Jala (Secretary-General, Office of The Council of State, Thailand), Othman Hashim (Deputy Secretary-General I, Ministry of Foreign Affairs, Malaysia), Krairit Nikuha (Director-General, Department of Mineral Fuels, Ministry of Energy, Thailand), Aziyah Baharuddin (Secretary, Tax Analysis Division, Ministry of Finance, Malaysia), Piyabhan Nimmanhaemin (Director-General, Comptroller-General's Department, Ministry of Finance, Thailand), Idrus Harun (Head, Advisory and International Law Division, Attorney-General's Chambers, Malaysia), and Vilawan Mangklatanakul (Director-General, Department of Treaties and Legal Affairs, Ministry of Foreign Affairs, Thailand).

CPOC serves as the Operator under the Joint Operating Agreement (JOA) dated 21 April 1994 between Petronas Carigali JDA Ltd (‘PCJDAL’) and PTTEPI in respect of the exploration and exploitation of petroleum under the Production Sharing Contract (‘PSC’) dated 21 April 1994 between the Malaysia – Thailand Joint Authority (MTJA) Block B-17 and C-19. Located in the area of overlapping continental shelf claimed by both Malaysia and Thailand at the lower part of Gulf of Thailand near the South China Sea. Geological, this overlapping area, situated in the northern part of the prolific Malay Basin, is known for its hydrocarbon potential. Under this Joint Operating Agreement (JOA’), PCJDAL and PTTEPI each entitled to a fifty per cent (50%) participating interest of all rights, interests, privileges, duties and obligations. The signed Gas Sales Agreement (GSA) between MTJA, PCJDAL and PTTEPI (as Sellers) and PTT Public Company Limited (as Buyer) which was signed on 16 June 2005 will marked the milestone for future gas export via PTT pipeline from the field to onshore facilities in Thailand. The first gas will be expected by 1 July 2008. In September 2002, MTJA made an exclusive offer to PCJDAL and PTTEPI to jointly acquire the relinquished areas of Blocks A-18, B-17 and C-19 in the MTJDA under a new PSC. This relinquished area with an area 3475 square kilometres, is known as Block B-17-01 signed between PCJDAL and PTTEPI simultaneously on 30 September 2004, CPOC has also been designated the Operator for Block B-17-01. Both PCJDAL and PTTEPI have a fifty per cent (50%) participating interest of all rights, interests, privileges, duties and obligations under this JOA. Discoveries from these activities will open up to business expansion for CPOC. Since its inception in 1994, CPOC had carried extensive exploration activities leading to successful 9 gas field discoveries namely Muda, Tapi, Jengka, Amarit, Mali, Jengka West, Jengka South, Jengka East and Muda South. The major gas filed in the block, Muda, is about 260 km from Songkhla in Southern Thailand and about 380 km from Kemaman supply base in East Coast of Peninsular Malaysia. The current activity for CPOC Block B-17 is on the field development planning stage (FDP), whereas Block B-17-01 is currently in the Exploration stage. The objective of Block B-17 development is to deliver the required Daily Contractual Quantity of 270 million cubic feet (7.6 million cubic metres) per day at standard conditions sustained for next 10 years and 250 million ft^{3} (7.1 million m^{3}) per day for the following 6 years, within HSE standards and at lowest total cost.

== See also ==
- Malaysia–Thailand border
- Malaysia–Vietnam border
