= Vilawan Mangklatanakul =

Thai legal practitioner and diplomat

- วิลาวรรณ มังคละธนะกุล
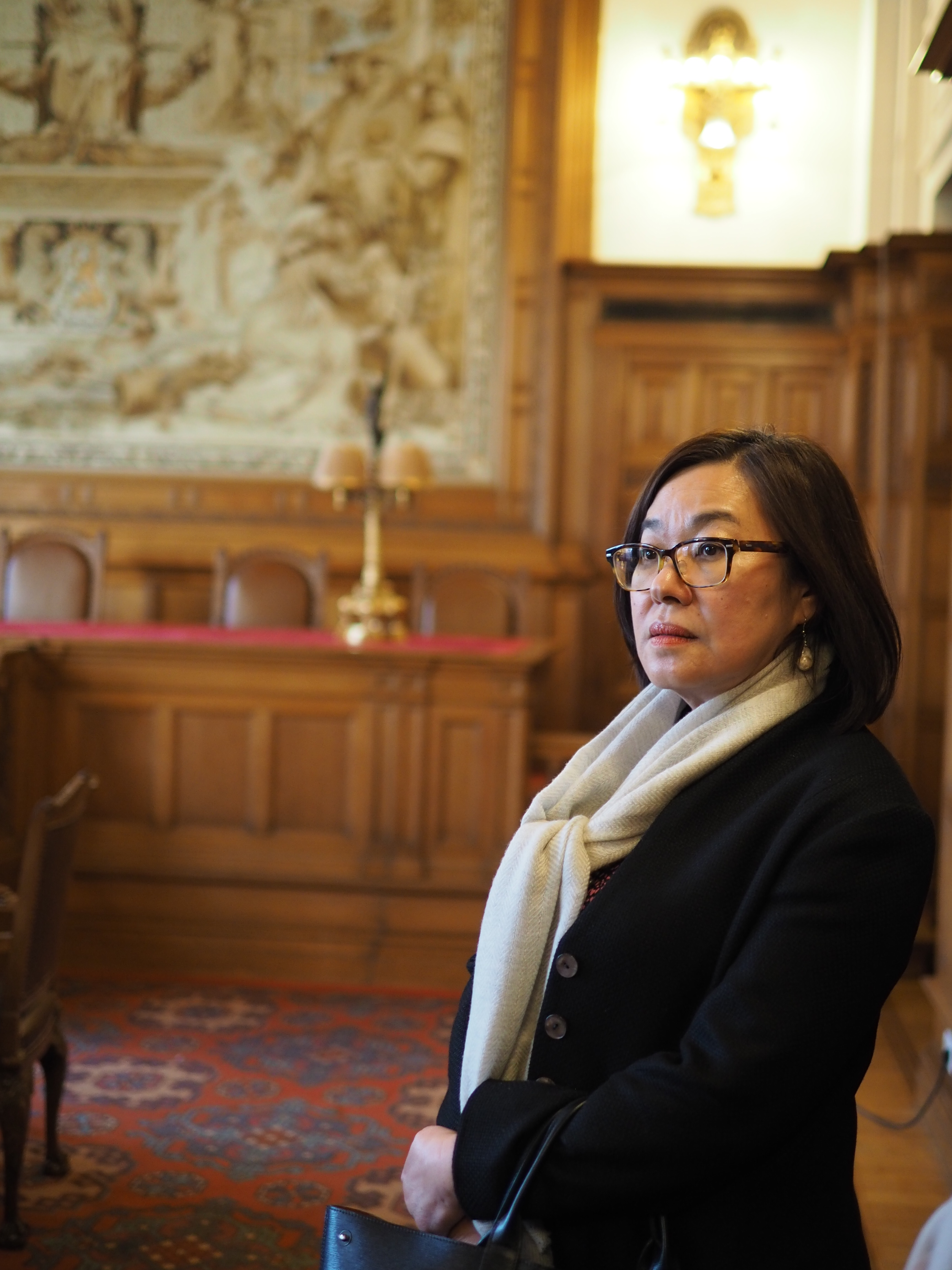

Ambassador Extraordinary and Plenipotentiary of The Kingdom of Thailand to the Republic of Austria, Ministry of Foreign Affairs of the Kingdom of Thailand
- In office 2022–present

Personal details
- Born: 13 July 1964 (age 62) Thailand
- Education: Thammasat University; University of London
- Profession: Lawyer, Diplomat

Vilawan Mangklatanakul (Thai: วิลาวรรณ มังคละธนะกุล, RTGS: Wilawan Mangkhlathanakun; born 13 July 1964) is a Thai lawyer and diplomat at Ministry of Foreign Affairs of Thailand. She joined the Foreign Service in 1995 and currently serves as Deputy Permanent Secretary for Foreign Affairs. In November 2021, Mangklatanakul was elected as one of the International Law Commission (ILC) Members for the term 2023–2027, making her the first Thai woman national and international lawyer from the Association of Southeast Asian Nations (ASEAN) region to serve the position.

== Early life and education ==
Vilawan Mangklatanakul was born on 13 July 1964 in Thailand. Having graduated from Thammasat University with a Bachelor of Laws (LL.B.), she continued her study in International Business Law and later received a Master of Laws (LL.M.) at Queen Mary College, University of London. In 1997, she completed her Doctor of Philosophy in Law (Ph.D.) at the Institute of Advanced Legal Studies, the University of London.

== Academic career ==
Mangklatanakul started her academic career in 1994 as a guest lecturer on international law at Chulalongkorn University, Thammasat University and Ramkhamhaeng University. She has also served as a supervisor and dissertation examiner at various universities in Thailand.

== Diplomatic career ==
Mangklatanakul joined the Ministry of Foreign Affairs of Thailand in 1995. From 2014 to 2015, she was Director of the Office of Policy and Planning. From 2015 to 2018, she was Deputy Director-General of the Department of Treaties and Legal Affairs. From 2018 to 2019, she was Director-General of the Department of International Economic Affairs. From 2019 to 2022, she was the first woman to serve as Director-General of Department of Treaties and Legal Affairs. From 2022 to November 2022, she was Deputy Permanent Secretary for Foreign Affairs. Since December 2022, she serves as Ambassador and Permanent Representative of Thailand to the United Nations Offices in Vienna.

Mangklatanakul has engaged in negotiations and conferences including the United Nations Commission on International Trade Law (UNCITRAL), Association of Southeast Asian Nations (ASEAN), Indian Ocean Rim Association (IORA), Ayeyawady-Chao Phraya-Mekong Economic Cooperation Strategy (ACMECS) and other multilateral fora. She was chief negotiator for Bilateral Investment Agreements (BITs) and Free Trade Agreements (FTAs), advocating for investor-state dispute settlement (ISDS) reform, while maintaining an interest in alternative dispute settlement as well as international trade law and its impact from climate change.

In January 2021, Mangklatanakul was nominated as the Thai candidate for the International Law Commission (ILC) for the term 2023–2027, and also the only woman nominated from the Asia-Pacific States for this election. On the course of the ILC Election 2021, held during the 76th Session of the United Nations General Assembly (UNGA76) on 12 November 2021 in New York, Mangklatanakul got elected to serve as the ILC Member from Asia-Pacific Group with 162 votes. This has made her the first Thai woman national and international lawyer from the Association of Southeast Asian Nations (ASEAN) region to serve the position.

In September 2023, Mangklatanakul was elected as the President of the 67th Regular Session of the General Conference of the International Atomic Energy Agency (IAEA). She is the sixth woman to have been elected to serve as President of the General Conference since the IAEA's establishment in 1957.

Mangklatanakul has also served on the Thailand Arbitration Center Board of Directors, the Malaysia-Thailand Joint Authority Board, the Anti-Money Laundering Office and most recently the Parliamentary Committee on the Impact of Thailand Accession to the Comprehensive and Progressive Agreement for Trans-Pacific Partnership (CPTPP). She also served as an Associate Judge of the Central Intellectual Property and International Trade Court of Thailand during 2003-2008 and is listed on the Thai Arbitration Institute's roster of arbitrators specialised in international trade law.

== Publications ==
- ″Thailand's First Treaty Arbitration: Gain from Pain,″ 2011 in Investor-State Disputes: Prevention and Alternatives to Arbitration II, Proceedings of the Washington and Lee University and UNCTAD Joint Symposium on International Investment and Alternative Dispute Resolution, held on 29 March 2010 in Lexington, Virginia, USA, UNCTAD, 2011, pp. 81–86.
- ″From Colonization to Globalization From FCN (Treaties) to BIT: the Principle of Non-Discrimination,″ Saranrom Magazine Vol. 67, 2010, pp. 75–78.
- ″Study and Analysis of FTA: Legal Implication and Enforcement,″ prepared for the Bank of Thailand, 2010.
- ″Appellate Body and the role of judicial activism: necessity or choice?,″ Liber Amicorum in honour of Professor Dr. Arun Panupong, Faculty of Law, Thammasat University, 2007, pp. 324–330.
- ″Study of three UN Conventions: Research on Legal Structure for developing Strategic Cluster Partnerships,″ prepared for the National Science and Technology Development Agency of Thailand, 2006.
- ″Research on the Law of International Sale of Goods,″ prepared for the National Research Council of Thailand, 2005.
- ″UN Convention on Assignment of Receivables in International Trade,″ Journal of Intellectual Property and International Trade Law, 6th Anniversary Special Edition, Central Intellectual Property and International Trade Court of Thailand, 2003, pp. 207–219.
