= Indonesia–Philippines border =

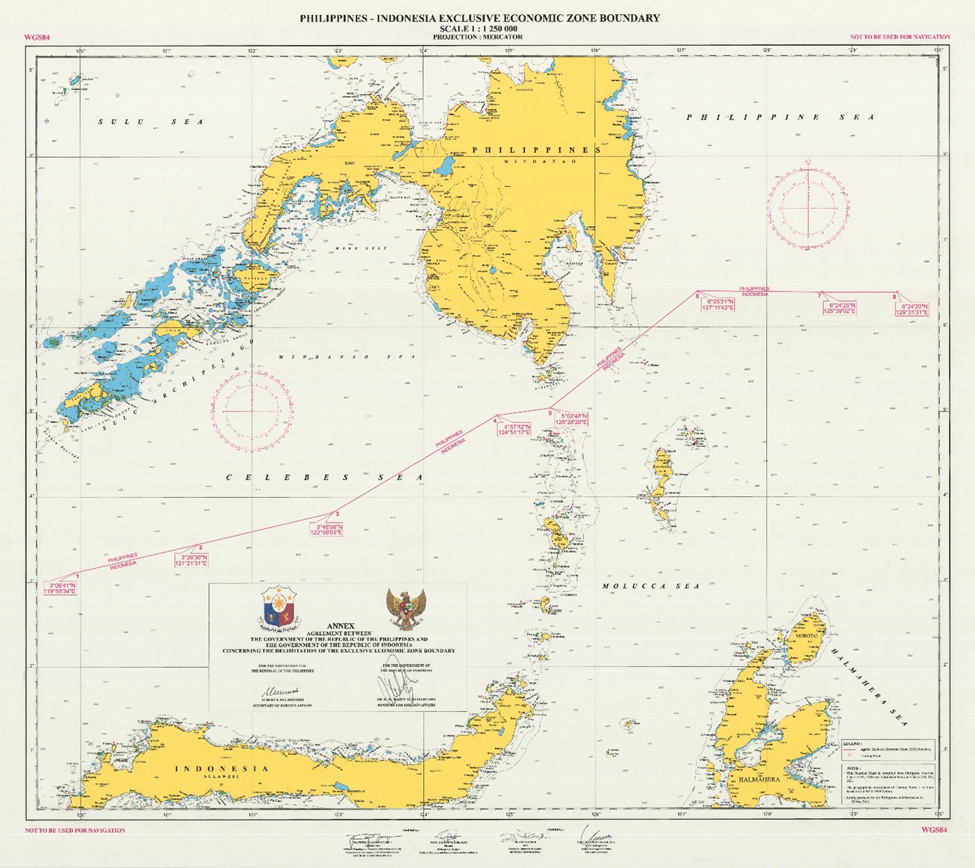
- Indonesia and Philippines Exclusive Economic Zone Boundary

Characteristics
- Entities: Indonesia Philippines

History
- Current shape: 2019; Delimitation of maritime boundaries
- Treaties: Island of Palmas Case 1928

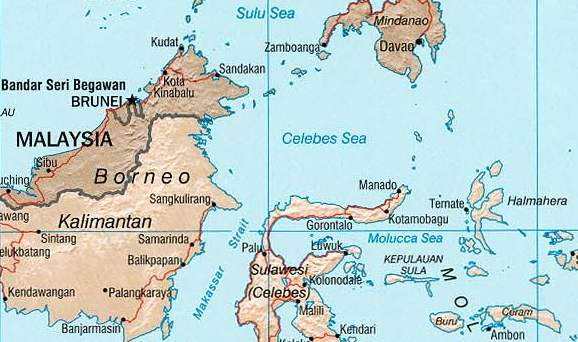
Celebes Sea, Between Indonesia and Philippines

The border between Indonesia and the Philippines consists of a maritime boundary mainly on the Celebes Sea that separates the two Southeast Asian countries as defined through a pact that was signed by both parties in 2014. The border is also the Exclusive Economic Zone (EEZ) boundary between Indonesia and the Philippines, which is delimited through eight geographic coordinate points. It has a length of 1,162.2 kilometres (627.5 nautical miles; 722.2 miles) dividing across the Celebes Sea to the Philippine Sea.

== History ==
=== Miangas island territorial dispute ===
When Spain ceded the Philippines to the United States of America through the Treaty of Paris of 1898, the sea borders of the Philippines were drawn in a rectangular line that resulted in ambiguous maritime boundaries of the neighboring territories including the then Dutch-colonized Indonesia. Territorial dispute arose in 1906 when then American Governor for the Moro Province, Leonard Wood, went to the island of Miangas after he discovered that the island was included in the Treaty of Paris of 1898. He learned that the island was claimed by the Dutch East Indies after seeing a Dutch flag.

In March 1906, the matter was referred by the United States government to the Netherlands through The Hague. In October 1906, the Netherlands Foreign Ministry replied and explained the reasons why the island was included in the Dutch East Indies. A legal case was filed on January 23, 1925, by the Netherlands and the United States to the Permanent Court of Arbitration, under a sole arbitrator Max Huber of Switzerland. It was decided on April 4, 1928, by Huber that the island is part of the territory of the Netherlands in its entirety. When Indonesia was no longer a Dutch colony and turned into a republic, the island of Miangas became part of its territory. Although, maritime boundaries surrounding the island as well as the border between Indonesia and the Philippines were unclear due to technicality.

=== Negotiations on sea borders ===
Indonesia and the Philippines are both signatories on the 1982 United Nations Convention on the Law of the Sea (UNCLOS). Eventually, Indonesia contested the sea territories of the Philippines as defined by the Treaty of Paris of 1898. Indonesia argued that the rectangular box drawn in the Treaty did not follow the UNCLOS. The Philippines understood the dispute of Indonesia but the Philippines was inclined to abide with Treaty of Paris due to pressure internally.

In June 1994, negotiations to resolve the border dispute started between the two countries during the First Senior Officials Meeting on the Delimitation of the Maritime Boundary at Manado, Indonesia. After which, the negotiations was inactive until 2003. In December 2003, Arif Havas Oegroseno from the Ministry of Foreign Affairs of Indonesia was designated to resume the negotiation talks with the Philippines. He continued the talks until 2010 when his successor took over his work to negotiate the sea border dispute. The series of negotiations from 1994 to 2014 were handled by the Joint Permanent Working Group on Maritime and Ocean Concerns (JPWG-MOC) helped by the three sub-working groups and the joint technical team.

=== Agreement ===
As the negotiation progressed, the Philippines reconsidered its position from what is defined on the Treaty of Paris of 1898 to conforming to the UNCLOS of 1982. On March 8, 2011, then Philippine Secretary of Foreign Affairs Alberto del Rosario and then Indonesian Foreign Minister Marty Natalegawa concurred to hasten the bilateral talks by signing a Joint Declaration that was issued during the state visit of then President of the Philippines Benigno Aquino III.

After eight meetings of the JPWG-MOC, an agreement on delimitation of maritime boundaries was finalized on May 18, 2014, at Jakarta, Indonesia. The agreement was signed by Del Rosario and Natalegawa on May 23, 2014, at Malacañang Palace. The sea border agreement was ratified by Indonesian Parliament on April 27, 2017. The agreement remained pending on Philippine Senate Committee on Foreign Relations for a little more than 5 years when on June 3, 2019, it adopted a resolution concurring in the ratification of the border agreement.

== Border ==
The following table shows the geographical coordinates points (using WGS 84) as defined in the Philippine and Indonesian agreement on the Exclusive Economic Zone boundary that was signed in 2014.

Point	Longitude (E)	Latitude (N)
1	119° 55' 34"	3° 06' 41"
2	121° 21' 31"	3° 26' 36"
3	122° 56' 03"	3° 48' 58"
4	124° 51' 17"	4° 57' 42"
5	125° 28' 20"	5° 02' 48"
6	127° 11' 42"	6° 25' 21"
7	128° 39' 02"	6° 24' 25"
8	129° 31' 31"	6° 24' 20"

== See also ==
- Indonesia–Philippines relations
- Malaysia–Philippines border
