= Malaysia–Vietnam border =

International maritime boundary between Malaysia and the Socialist Republic of Vietnam

Malaysia and Vietnam are two Southeast Asian countries with maritime boundaries which meet in the Gulf of Thailand and South China Sea. The two countries have overlapping claims over the continental shelf in the Gulf of Thailand. Both countries have, however, come to an agreement to jointly exploit the natural resources in the disputed area pending resolution of the dispute over sovereignty.

In the South China Sea, Malaysia and Vietnam are involved in the multi-national claims over some of the Spratly Islands and adjacent waters.

== The border and disputes ==
=== Gulf of Thailand ===
Both Malaysia and Vietnam have overlapping claims over the seabed in the Gulf of Thailand. There is currently no boundary agreement between the two countries.

The continental shelf claim limit of the two countries do not coincide because of the different maritime baselines each country uses to calculate the equidistant line. This has resulted in an area of overlapping claims. The Vietnamese continental shelf limit was proclaimed in 1971 by the then South Vietnamese government and was the equidistant line between the Malaysian and Vietnamese mainlands without taking into account offshore islands. Malaysia's claim is made through a territorial sea and continental shelf map published by its Mapping and Survey Department in 1979 showing the boundary, drawn as the equidistant line between Malaysia's Redang Island and the Vietnamese shore, ignoring islands off its coast.

The eastern terminus of any future Malaysia–Vietnam border seems to have been established at northern terminus of the 1969 Indonesia–Malaysia continental shelf border at a point designated as Point 20, with the coordinates 6° 05.8' N 105° 49.2' E. Point 20 is the equidistant point from the baselines of Indonesia, Malaysia and Vietnam. Although not determined by any tripartite agreement, bilateral agreements governing the Indonesia–Malaysia and Indonesia–Vietnam maritime borders as well as the agreement to establish the Malaysia–Vietnam joint development Defined Area (see below) virtually set Point 20 as the common tripoint for the three countries.

The western terminus of the Malaysia–Vietnam border, which should also be the common tripoint for Malaysia, Thailand and Vietnam, has not been determined as the respective borders for the three countries are subject to dispute. The determination of the tripoint would require the disputes involving the Malaysia–Thailand and Malaysia–Vietnam borders to be settled.

Thailand and Vietnam has agreed to a continental shelf boundary, with "Point C" as the eastern terminus of their common continental shelf border. This point (with coordinates 07° 48' 00" N, 103° 02' 30" E) coincides with Point 43 in the 1979 map produced by Malaysia's Mapping and Survey Department depicting the country's territorial sea and continental shelf claims. In Malaysia's perspective, Point 43/Point C would be the common tripoint for Malaysia, Thailand and Vietnam, and thus the westernmost terminus of the Malaysia-Vietnam common border. Thailand and Vietnam do not recognise this position as they does not recognise Malaysia's continental shelf boundary asserted in the 1979 map.

Point	Longitude (E)	Latitude (N)	Remarks
Continental shelf boundary turning point coordinates in Malaysia's 1979 map
41	105° 49'.2	6° 5'.8	Same as Point 20 (northern terminus) of the Indonesia–Malaysia continental shelf boundary and the western terminus of the Indonesia–Vietnam continental shelf boundary; Point E of the Malaysia–Vietnam joint development Defined Area
42	104° 30'.0	6° 48'.25	Same as Point F of the Defined Area
43	103° 2'.5	7° 48'.0	Same as Point C (eastern terminus) of the agreed Thailand–Vietnam continental shelf boundary
Continental shelf boundary claimed by Vietnam
1	105° 49'.2	6° 5'.8	Same as Point 20 (northern terminus) of the Indonesia–Malaysia continental shelf boundary and western terminus of the Indonesia–Vietnam continental shelf boundary; Point E of the Malaysia–Vietnam joint development Defined Area
2	103° 52'.0	7° 3'.0	Same as Point D of the Defined Area
3	103° 35'.71	7° 18'.31	Same as Point C of the Defined Area
4	103° 2'.5	7° 48'.0	Same as Point 43 in the 1979 Malaysian map and Point C (eastern terminus) of the agreed Thailand-Vietnam continental shelf boundary

Both countries signed a memorandum of understanding on 5 June 1992 to allow joint exploitation of natural resources in the area of overlapping claims, which the agreement called the Defined Area. The area is also known as Block PM3 Commercial Arrangement Area or CAA (see below).

The western portion of the overlapping claim area is also claimed by Thailand and that area is currently included in the Malaysia–Thailand joint development area. The Defined Area established under the 1992 MOU does not include this area. In 1999, all three countries agreed in principle to jointly develop this area using joint development principles.

=== South China Sea ===
Malaysia and Vietnam both have overlapping claims in the South China Sea involving the continental shelf as well as the islands of the Spratly group. Both Malaysia and Vietnam are two of several countries asserting claims over the islands and waters of the area. Because of the uncertainty, no maritime border agreement exists for the area.

==== Malaysian claim ====
Malaysia claims a portion of the South China Sea together with 11 islands and other marine features in the Spratly group on the basis that they are within its continental shelf. Brunei, China, the Philippines and Vietnam also have overlapping claims over the entire or a portion of the area claimed by Malaysia.

Malaysia currently occupies one island - Swallow Reef or Pulau Layang-Layang - five reefs and one shoal. It also claims two marine features currently occupied by Vietnam, namely Amboyna Cay and Barque Canada Reef. Amboyna Cay is also claimed by the Philippines. Malaysia claims Commodore Reef which is occupied by the Philippines and Royal Charlotte Reef which is currently not occupied.

All the features claimed by Malaysia are also claimed by Vietnam and China (as well as Taiwan). Five features currently occupied by Malaysia are claimed by the Philippines and one is claimed by Brunei.

Point	Longitude (E)	Latitude (N)	Remarks
Malaysia's continental shelf claim according to its 1979 map
52	109° 38'.6	6° 18'.2	This point is the eastern terminus of the Indonesia–Vietnam border and the northern terminus of the Indonesia–Malaysia border off the western extremity of Sarawak
53	111° 34'	7° 027'.75	
54	112° 30'.75	8° 23'.75	
55	113° 16'.25	8° 44'.42	
56	113° 39'	8° 33'.92	
57	113° 47'.75	8° 24'.42	
58	113° 52'.42	8° 24'.43	
59	114° 19'.83	8° 23'.75	
60	114° 29'.17	8° 30'.25	
61	114° 50'.12	8° 28'.17	
62	115° 10'.58	8° 55'	
63	115° 8'.75	8° 49'.08	
64	115° 54'.08	8° 19'.92	
65	116° 03'.5	8° 01'.5	
66	116° 00'	7° 40'	This is the western starting point of the treaty defined boundary between Malaysia and the Philippines

==== Vietnamese claim ====
Vietnam claims the entire Spratly Islands group based on historic grounds, and as such, claims all 11 islands and other marine features occupied as well as claimed by Malaysia. It currently has possession of six islands, 17 reefs and three banks and of these, one island and a reef - Amboyna Cay and Barque Canada Reef/Lizzie Weber Reef - are claimed by Malaysia.

Other features claimed by Vietnam are currently occupied by China, the Philippines and Taiwan.

For details of the Spratly Islands dispute, see the Spratly Islands page.

==== Extended continental shelf claims ====
Pursuant to Article 76 of the United Nations Convention on the Law of the Sea, Malaysia and Vietnam on 6 May 2009 jointly submitted to the Commission on the Limits of the Continental Shelf a notification of the two countries' extended continental shelf claims. The "defined area" claimed in the joint submission covered a stretch of the South China Sea which lay in between the 200 nautical mile limit of the two countries. The area in question includes part of the Spratly Islands and its adjacent waters.

The joint submission stated that the area was already subject to overlapping claims, including by both the submitting countries. The submission did not define the extended continental shelf claim of each country but merely defined the area which both countries were jointly claiming. Nevertheless, Malaysian Prime Minister Najib Abdul Razak said the two countries had reached a broad understanding as to the apportionment of the defined area.

China, which is one of the claimants of the Spratly Islands and its adjacent waters, lodged a note with the UN Secretary-General on 7 May 2009 objecting to the extended continental shelf submission. The basis for the objection was that the area claimed was under Chinese sovereignty. Premier Wen Jiabao later said all countries with territorial claims in the South China Sea should strictly follow the Declaration on the Code of Conduct on the South China Sea.

Vietnam responded to China's note the following day, stating in a note that it had legal rights to claim the area defined in the joint submission. It also disputed China's claim over the area. Malaysia also responded with a note asserting its legal right to claim the area and stating that it recognised the overlapping claims by various countries over the area. During a state visit to China in June, Malaysian prime minister Najib Abdul Razak said China and Malaysia had reached an understanding and agreed to continue negotiations over all territorial disputes.

Another objection to the Malaysia–Vietnam joint submission was received from the Philippines on 4 August 2009. The note said the defined area was subject to a claim by the Philippines as well as subject to territorial disputes over "some of the islands in the area including North Borneo." In its reply on 18 August 2009, Vietnam stated its legal right to lodge the submission and reasserted its "indisputable sovereignty" over the Spratly and Paracel Islands. Malaysia's reply on 21 August 2009 also stated its legal right to lodge the submission and said there was an earlier invitation to the Philippines to join the joint submission which was ultimately rejected. Malaysia also rejected the Philippines' assertion of sovereignty claims over North Borneo, pointing to the separate judgement of Judge Ad Hoc Franck in the Sipadan and Ligitan Case of the International Court of Justice.

Presentation of the submission was made to the Commission on 27 August 2009 during its 24th session. The commission decided to defer any consideration on the submission to a future date.

== Joint development area ==
On 5 June 1992, Malaysia and Vietnam signed the Memorandum of Understanding between Malaysia and the Socialist Republic of Vietnam for the Exploration and Exploitation of Petroleum in a Defined Area of the Continental Shelf involving the Two Countries to enable joint exploitation of petroleum in the Defined Area, which is better known as Block PM3 Commercial Arrangement Area (CAA).

The defined area is about 2,008 km square. Oil production began in 1997 from the Bunga Kekwa field. Other producing fields are the East Bunga Kekwa-Cai Nuoc, East Bunga Raya, West Bunga Raya, Northwest Bunga Raya and Bunga Seroja fields, all of which are located in the southeast portion of the block. The East Bunga Kekwa-Cai Nuoc is a unitized field and a portion of which extends onto Vietnam Block 46-Cai Nuoc, which is located within Vietnamese waters and not within the border dispute area. The northern fields consist of the Bunga Orkid and Bunga Pakma fields.

The operator for PM3 CAA is Talisman Energy. An extension to the Production Sharing Contract between Petronas and Petrovietnam on one part and Talisman on the other was extended on 6 April 2017 by the former until 2027.

Point	Longitude (E)	Latitude (N)	Remarks
Boundary coordinates of the Malaysia–Vietnam joint development area
A	103° 42'.5	7° 22'	Same as Point D of the border of the Malaysia–Thailand joint development area.
B	103° 39'	7° 20'	
C	103° 35'.71	7° 18'.31	
D	103° 52'	7° 3'	
E	105° 49'.2	6° 5'.8	Same as Point 41 in the 1979 Malaysia map. Also Point 25 (northern terminus) of the South China Sea (Sarawak) portion of the Indonesia–Malaysia continental shelf border.
F	104° 30'	6° 48'.25	Same as Point 42 in the 1979 Malaysia map. The border then returns to Point A.

== See also ==
- Brunei–Malaysia border
- Indonesia–Malaysia border
- Indonesia–Vietnam border
- Malaysia–Philippines border
- Malaysia–Thailand border
- Spratly Islands
