= Indonesia–Thailand border =

Indonesia and Thailand share a common maritime border in the northern part of the Straits of Malacca and the Andaman Sea to the north-east of Indonesia's Sumatera Island and to the west of the western coastline of southern Thailand. The maritime boundary runs between the India-Indonesia-Thailand tripoint in the north, and the Indonesia-Malaysia-Thailand tripoint in the south.

The border was delimited through four agreements, with two involving third parties India and Malaysia as they determined trijunction points with those countries.

== The border ==
The four boundary delimitation agreements that finalized determination of the two countries' common borders are the Indonesia-Thailand continental shelf boundary delimitation agreement of 17 December 1971; the Indonesia-Malaysia-Thailand tripartite continental shelf boundary delimitation agreement of 21 December 1971; the Indonesia-Thailand sea-bed boundary delimitation agreement on 11 December 1975; and the India-Indonesia-Thailand trijunction and related boundaries tripartite agreement of 22 June 1978.

- The first of the four agreements is the "Agreement between the Government of the Kingdom of Thailand and the Government of the Republic of Indonesia relating to the Delimitation of a Continental Shelf Boundary between the two Countries in the Northern Part of the Straits of Malacca and in the Andaman Sea" signed on 17 December 1971 in Bangkok which determined the common boundary between the two countries as a straight line between Point 1 and Point 2 (see table below). The agreement, which came into force on 16 July 1973, also extended the common boundary from Point 1 to the Indonesia-Malaysia-Thailand common tripoint which had earlier been established via a Memorandum of Understanding signed on 15 October 1970.
- The common tripoint (listed as CP in the table below) was legally established by the three countries four days later on 21 December 1971 when they signed the tripartite "Agreement between the Government of the Republic of Indonesia, The Government of Malaysia and the Government of the Kingdom of Thailand Relating to the Delimitation of the Continental Shelf Boundaries in the Northern Part of the Strait of Malacca" in Kuala Lumpur. This agreement, which also came into force on 16 July 1973, reiterated the common boundary as extending in straight lines running from the Common Point 2 via Point 1.
- In Jakarta on 11 December 1975, Indonesia and Thailand signed the "Agreement between the Government of the Republic of Indonesia and the Government of the Kingdom of Thailand relating to the delimitation of the sea-bed boundary between the two countries in the Andaman Sea." This agreement extends the common boundary from Point 2, renamed Point A in the agreement, in a northwesterly direction to Point L.
- Point L was located just short of the common tripoint for India, Indonesia and Thailand (Point T in table below) which was subsequently established in the "Agreement between the Government of the Kingdom of Thailand, the Government of the Republic of India and the Government of the Republic of Indonesia concerning the determination of the trijunction point and the delimitation of the related boundaries of the three countries in the Andaman Sea" which was signed on 22 June 1978 in New Delhi. The tripartite agreement, which entered into force on 2 March 1979, also extended the Indonesia-Thailand boundary from Point L to the trijunction Point T.

The coordinates of end and turning-points of the border are as follows:-

Point	Latitude (N)	Longitude (E)	Remarks
Trijunction and related boundaries under the 1978 India-Indonesia-Thailand tripartite agreement
Trijunction	07° 47' 00"	95° 31' 48"	The boundary runs as a straight line from the trijunction to Point L below
Sea-bed boundary end and turning points under 1975 Indonesia-Thailand agreement
L	07° 46' 06"	95° 33' 06"	
A	07° 05' 48"	96° 36' 30"	This point is also called Point 2 under the 1971 Indonesia-Thailand agreement
Continental shelf boundary end and turning points under 1971 Indonesia-Thailand agreement
2	07° 05' 48"	96° 36' 30"	This point is also called Point A under the 1975 Indonesia-Thailand agreement
1	06° 21' 48"	97° 54' 00"	
Continental shelf boundary end and turning points under 1971 Indonesia-Malaysia-Thailand agreement
CP	5° 57' 00"	98° 01' 50"	

== See also ==
- Indonesia-Malaysia border
- Malaysia-Thailand border
