= Malaysia–Philippines border =

International maritime border in Asia

Coordinates: 3.1828°N 119.4672°E

The Malaysia–Philippines border is a maritime boundary located in the South China, Sulu and Celebes Seas. It separates the Malaysian state of Sabah, which is on the island of Borneo, and the Sulu Islands of the southern Philippines.

The boundary is the result of the division of the Sulu Sultanate through the cession of its territories to colonial powers. The British gained control of the northeast shores of Borneo, which became known as North Borneo and subsequently Sabah, while the rest of the Sulu Islands fell under Spanish control and later United States rule. The Philippines still officially claim the eastern part of Sabah as part of its territory, arguing the validity of the cession by the heirs of the Sultan of Sulu.

This historical backdrop laid the groundwork for a long-standing territorial dispute, reignited through the high-profile Malaysia–Sulu arbitration case. The self-proclaimed descendants of the last Sultan of Sulu filed a multi-billion-dollar claim against the Malaysian government, citing a colonial-era 1878 agreement that granted a British company rights over territory now part of present-day Sabah. Malaysia honored the agreement for decades, paying an annual cession of approximately $1,000 to the Sultan’s heirs until 2013, when it ceased payments following the Lahad Datu standoff. In response, the claimants pursued international arbitration, demanding US$32 billion. In January 2022, Spanish arbitrator Gonzalo Stampa ruled in their favor, awarding US$15 billion, the largest arbitration award in history. However, on 27 June 2023, The Hague Court of Appeal struck down the award, marking a “landmark victory” for Malaysia. Most recently, Stampa was convicted of contempt of court for “knowingly disobeying rulings and orders from the Madrid High Court of Justice,” and sentenced to six months in prison.

Malaysia and the Philippines are also parties to the multinational claims over the Spratly Islands and both countries have overlapping claims over some islands of the archipelago. The historical connections of the people living on both sides of the border has resulted in the border being extremely porous, with a lot of illegal immigration from the Philippines to Malaysia occurring. The porous border has also resulted in several incidents of cross-border raids and kidnapping by armed groups from the Philippines on Malaysian towns and resorts on the east coast of Sabah.

== The border and disputes ==
The Malaysian–Philippine border consists of two segments. The first segment is the portion that has already been delimited through treaty. The second maritime segment has yet to be delimited because it is in the Spratly Islands area in the South China Sea where the two countries have overlapping claims over the continental shelf and islands.

=== Treaty defined border ===
Three treaties defined the territorial extent of the Philippine archipelago, of which two are relevant in terms of determining the boundary between Malaysia and the Philippines. The third treaty concerns the cession of some islands in the Sulu Sea but does not include any boundary determination clauses.

The Treaty of Paris of 1898 between Spain and the United States defined the territorial waters of the Philippines. Only one portion of the boundary delimited by this treaty is relevant to the common border between the two countries. The relevant stretch lies between the Philippine island of Palawan and the northern tip of the Malaysian state of Sabah between turning points 7° 40' N 116° 0' E and 7° 40' N 117° 0' E. Although the British were not parties to this treaty, it has never challenged the extent of Philippine territorial waters after occupying North Borneo (Sabah today). Malaysia too has not challenged the boundary and had in fact recognised it via its 1979 map which follows this portion of the boundary as the extent of its territorial waters.

The second treaty is the Convention regarding the Boundary between the Philippine Archipelago and the State of North Borneo between the United States and the United Kingdom which was signed at Washington, D.C., on 2 January 1930. The treaty subsequently came into force with the Exchange of Notes on 6 July 1932. The United States was the sovereign ruler of the Philippines at that time after acquiring it from Spain under the 1898 treaty between the US and Spain while the UK was the colonial ruler of North Borneo. The modern states of the Philippines and Malaysia became the successor states of the said treaties. Article I of this treaty establishes the turning points for the defined portion of the maritime border between Malaysia and the Philippines. The convention amended portions of the limits defined by the 1898 treaty to the current alignment of the Malaysia–Philippines border in the Sulu Sea, between point 7° 40' N 117° 0' E and 4° 45' N 120° 0' E.

No common tri-point for Indonesia, Malaysia and the Philippines in the Celebes Sea was established as this treaty did not involve the Netherlands, being the colonial ruler of what is today Indonesia, as a signatory. The three countries have also not negotiated for a common tri-point after their independence. In fact, Indonesia and Malaysia are currently involved in a dispute resulting from overlapping claims of the continental shelf in the Celebes Sea and negotiations to establish the tripoint seem unlikely for the near future.

Point	Latitude (N)	Longitude (E)	Remarks
Malaysia–Philippines boundary end and turning points according to 1930 treaty
1	4° 45'	120° 0'	Eastern terminus of boundary defined by 1930 treaty where the amended territorial limits rejoins the limits defined by the 1898 treaty. Malaysia regards this point as outside its jurisdiction
2	4° 23'	120° 0'	Malaysia's 1979 map regards this as the Indonesia–Malaysia–Philippines tri-point and the actual eastern terminus of the Malaysia–Philippines border
3	4° 23'	119° 0'	
4	4° 42'	119° 0'	
5	5° 16'	119° 35'	
6	6° 0'	118° 50'	
7	6° 0'	118° 20'	
8	6° 17'	117° 58'	
9	6° 52'	117° 58'	
10	7° 24' 45"	117° 25' 30"	
11	7° 40'	117° 0'	The western terminus of the Malaysia–Philippines boundary as per 1930 treaty. Border rejoins the limits defined by 1898 treaty.
Malaysia–Philippines boundary end and turning points according to the 1898 treaty
1	7° 40'	117° 0'	This point is also the western terminus of the Malaysia–Philippines boundary as per 1930 treaty.
2	7° 40'	116° 0'	Deemed western terminus of delimited Malaysia–Philippines boundary

=== Disputed boundary ===
Both Malaysia and the Philippines also have overlapping claims over the continental shelf and islands in the Spratly Islands area of the South China Sea. China/Taiwan and Vietnam also claim the entire Spratly Islands area as part of their territory and territorial waters while a small portion of the area of overlapping claim by Malaysia and the Philippines is also claimed by Brunei.

==== Malaysian claim ====
Malaysia bases its claim on the United Nations Convention on the Law of the Sea's 200-nautical-mile (370 km) rule. In 1979, it published a territorial sea and continental shelf map depicting its claim over the area.

Point	Longitude (E)	Latitude (N)	Remarks
Malaysia's continental shelf claim in the South China Sea according to the 1979 map
52	109° 38'.6	6° 18'.2	Northern terminus of the Indonesia–Malaysia border and eastern terminus of the Indonesia–Vietnam border
53	111° 34'	7° 027'.75	
54	112° 30'.75	8° 23'.75	Disputed by the Philippines
55	113° 16'.25	8° 44'.42	Disputed by the Philippines
56	113° 39'	8° 33'.92	Disputed by the Philippines
57	113° 47'.75	8° 24'.42	Disputed by the Philippines
58	113° 52'.42	8° 24'.43	Disputed by the Philippines
59	114° 19'.83	8° 23'.75	Disputed by the Philippines
60	114° 29'.17	8° 30'.25	Disputed by the Philippines
61	114° 50'.12	8° 28'.17	Disputed by the Philippines
62	115° 10'.58	8° 55'	Disputed by the Philippines
63	115° 8'.75	8° 49'.08	Disputed by the Philippines
64	115° 54'.08	8° 19'.92	Disputed by the Philippines
65	116° 03'.5	8° 01'.5	Disputed by the Philippines
66	116° 00'	7° 40'	This is the western starting point of the treaty defined boundary between Malaysia and the Philippines

The Philippines claim results in the boundary claimed by Malaysia above being disputed from midway between Point 53 and Point 54 onwards until Point 66 which is the western starting point of the treaty defined, and thus agreed to, boundary between the two countries.

==== Philippines claim ====
The Philippines' claim in the Spratly Islands area, known as the Kalayaan Islands, is based on discovery and geographical continuity. The territorial waters of the claim was declared by President Ferdinand Marcos in Presidential Decree 1596 on 11 June 1978. The claim was further reinforced in the Philippines Archipelagic Baselines Act (Republic Act No. 9522) signed by President Gloria Macapagal-Arroyo on 11 March 2009.

In early November 2024, Philippine President Bongbong Marcos signed the Philippine Maritime Zones Act and the Philippine Archipelagic Sea Lanes Act. These laws reaffirmed the Philippines' maritime territories and rights to natural resources across the South China Sea, including Sabah, drawing strong criticism from Malaysia. On November 15, 2024, Kuala Lumpur lodged a diplomatic protest against the two maritime laws, arguing that they infringed upon Malaysia's territorial boundaries in the South China Sea.

Point	Longitude (E)	Latitude (N)	Remarks
The Philippines' Kalayaan Islands claim
1	118° 00'	12° 00'	
2	114° 30'	12° 00'	
3	112° 10'	8° 00'	
4	112° 10'	7° 00'	Disputed by Malaysia
5	116° 00'	7° 40'	Same as the westernmost terminus of treaty defined border between Malaysia and the Philippines; same as Point 66 of Malaysia's 1979 map

== See also ==
- Indonesia–Philippines border
- Malaysia–Philippines relations
- Spratly Islands
