= Indonesia–Vietnam border =

The border between Indonesia and Vietnam is a maritime border located in the South China Sea to the north of Indonesia's Natuna Islands. The two countries signed an agreement to determine their continental shelf boundary on 26 June 2003 in Hanoi, Vietnam.

Although located near, the border is not located in the Spratly Islands area and Indonesia does not have any claims over the islands.

== The border ==
The Agreement between the Government of the Republic of Indonesia and the Government of the Socialist Republic of Vietnam concerning the delimitation of the Continental Shelf Boundary was signed on 26 June 2003 in Hanoi, Vietnam, by Indonesia's Foreign Minister Hasan Wirajuda and his Vietnamese counterpart Nguyen Dy Nien.

The agreement defined the continental shelf boundary of the two countries as the imaginary straight line located between the two terminal points - namely Point 20 and Point 25 - of the 1969 continental shelf agreement between Indonesia and Malaysia with four turning points in between.

Point	Longitude (E)	Latitude (N)	Remarks
Continental shelf boundary end and turning point coordinates
20	105° 49' 12"	6° 5' 48"	This is the northern terminus of the Indonesia-Malaysia continental shelf boundary (off the East Coast of Peninsula Malaysia segment) agreed to in 1969; easternmost point of the Malaysia-Vietnam area of overlapping claims
H	106° 12'	6° 15'	
H1	106° 19' 01"	6° 15'	
A4	106° 39' 37.67"	6° 20' 59.88"	
X1	109° 17' 13"	6° 50' 15"	
25	109° 38' 36"	6° 18' 12"	This is also the northern terminus of the Indonesia-Malaysia continental shelf boundary (off the northwest coast of Borneo segment) agreed to in 1969; western terminus of Malaysia's continental shelf off the coast of Borneo as asserted in its 1979 map

== History ==
Agreement on a final demarcation was announced on 22 December 2022.

== See also ==
- Indonesia-Malaysia border
- Malaysia-Vietnam border
- Indonesia-Vietnam relations
