= Indonesia–Singapore relations =

- Indonesia: Singapore

Diplomatic mission
- Embassy of Indonesia, Singapore: Embassy of Singapore, Jakarta

Envoy
- Indonesian Ambassador to Singapore Suryopratomo: Singaporean Ambassador to Indonesia Kwok Fook Seng

Indonesia and Singapore established diplomatic relations on 7 September 1967, a month after the formation of the Association of Southeast Asian Nations (ASEAN) on 8 August 1967. Indonesia and Singapore are two of the five founding members of ASEAN (including Malaysia, Thailand, Philippines). Both nations are also members of the Non-Aligned Movement and APEC.

Over the years, Indonesia and Singapore have maintained regular exchanges of high-level visits, underpinned by strong economic cooperation across a wide range of sectors, including health, defence and the environment. In the past decade, Singapore has consistently been Indonesia's top foreign investor.

2017 marked the 50th anniversary of their diplomatic relations in a celebration event known as RISING50, an amalgamation of “RI” for the Republic of Indonesia and “SING” for Singapore.

== History ==
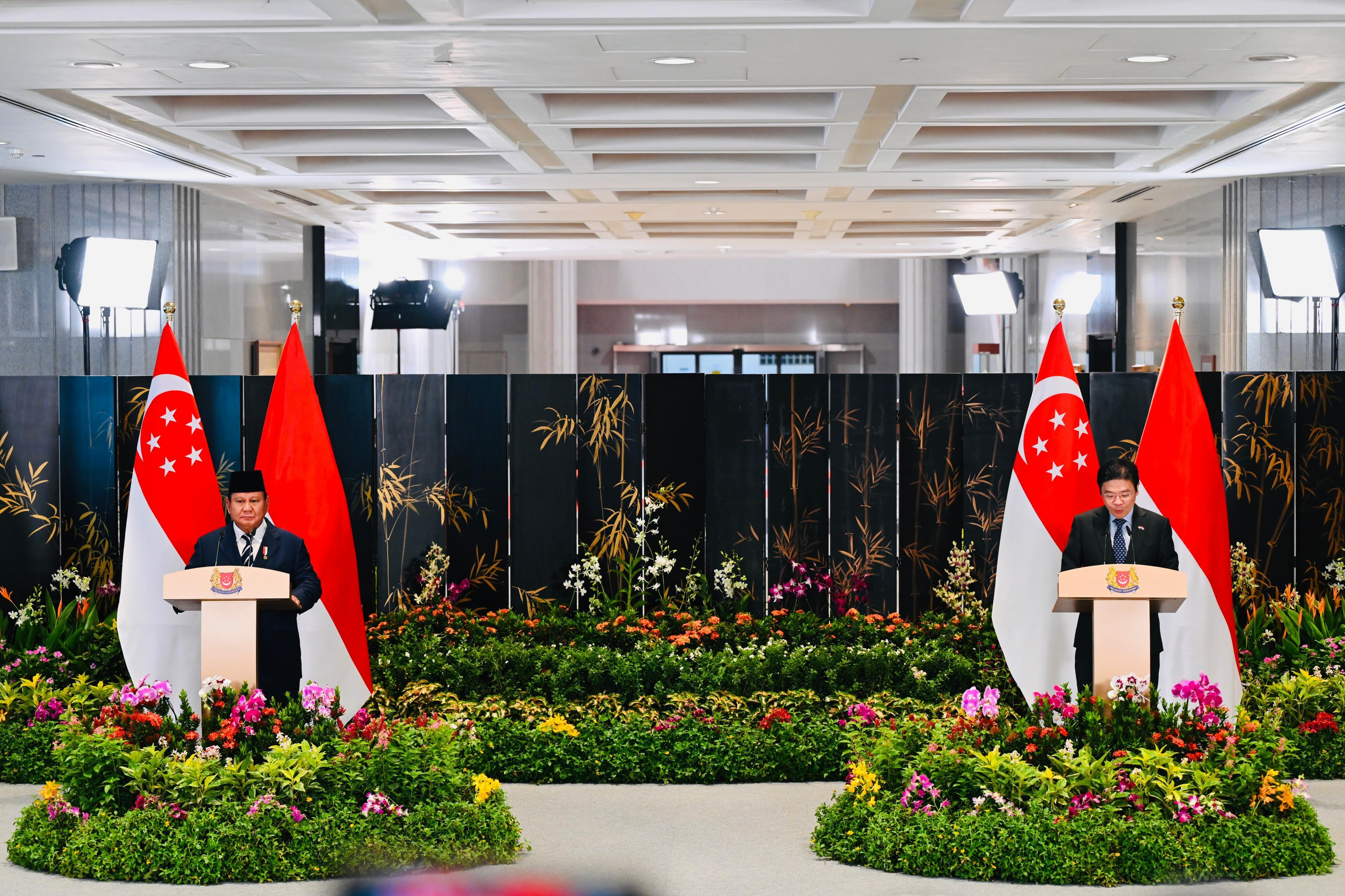
Indonesian President Prabowo Subianto and Singaporean Prime Minister Lawrence Wong at the Parliament House in Singapore.

The relations between ancient Indonesia and Singapore dated back from the period of ancient kingdoms, the straits region was part of Srivijaya’s realm back in 7th century. The Nagarakretagama, a Javanese eulogy written in 1365 during Majapahit era, also referred to a settlement on the island called Temasek ('Sea Town' in Old Javanese, spelt Tumasik).

In 1299, the ruler of Palembang, Sang Nila Utama, established the Kingdom of Singapura in Temasek. In the mid 1390s, a Palembang prince, Parameswara, fled to Temasek after being deposed by the Majapahit kingdom. During the 14th century, Singapore was caught in the struggle between Siam (now Thailand) and the Java-based Majapahit Empire for control over the Malay Peninsula. According to Sejarah Melayu, Singapore was defeated in one Majapahit attack. He ruled the island for several years, before being forced to Melaka where he founded the Sultanate of Malacca.

The Indonesian archipelago gradually fell under the control of the Dutch, initially through the Dutch East India Company (VOC) and later under direct Dutch government rule as the Dutch East Indies, with the capital Batavia (now Jakarta) served as the administrative headquarters and a major port for the Dutch in the region, forming the center of their spice trade monopoly. In January 1819, Sir Stamford Raffles, an agent of the British East India Company (EIC), arrived in Singapore and signed a preliminary agreement with the local Temenggong. Recognizing a succession dispute, Raffles installed the elder brother, Hussein Shah, as the rightful Sultan of Johor, and a formal treaty was signed on 6 February 1819, granting the British the right to establish a trading post. In 1826, Singapore was incorporated into the Straits Settlements alongside Penang and Malacca, a single administrative unit in the Malay Peninsula under the control of the East India Company. Singapore became the capital of the Straits Settlements in 1832 due to its growing economic importance as a free port. The treaty formalized the division of the Malay archipelago into distinct British and Dutch spheres of influence, with the British ceding their possessions in Sumatra (like Bencoolen) to the Dutch in exchange for Malacca and Dutch recognition of British control of Singapore. This division shaped the modern-day borders of Singapore and Indonesia. The British colonial administration heavily relied on large-scale importation of Chinese, Indian (mostly Tamil), and some Malay laborers to build plantations (especially rubber) and infrastructure in Singapore. The Japanese invasions of Singapore and Indonesia were catastrophic defeats for the British and Dutch empires, regarded by Winston Churchill as the "worst disaster" in British military history, Singapore surrendered on 15 February 1942, after a 70-day campaign. Approximately 80,000–130,000 British, Indian, and Australian troops were taken prisoner, the largest surrender of British-led personnel ever, while the Dutch forces surrendered on 9 March 1942. This loss deprived the Allies of vital oil and rubber resources and forced the Dutch colonial government into exile. The atomic bombings of Hiroshima and Nagasaki had forced Japan to surrender in August 1945, two days following the Japanese surrender, the Indonesian nationalist leaders Sukarno and Mohammad Hatta unilaterally declared independence from the Netherlands (Dutch) on 17 August during the Indonesian War of Independence. The Dutch did not recognize this declaration until it was formally recognized sovereignty on 27 December 1949. Singapore returned to British rule. The state of emergency was declared in Singapore on 24 June 1948, approximately one week after it was proclaimed across the Federation of Malaya, with Singapore as part of British Malaya became the two operated in tandem, led by General Chin Peng of the Malayan Communist Party (MCP) and the Malayan National Liberation Army (MNLA). Sir Franklin Gimson, the Governor of Singapore became the target of an unsuccessful assassination attempt on 28 April 1950 by the MCP, as they sought to overthrow the British by attempting to establish a "Malayan People's Republic". Chin later moved to Thailand, where he establish a base in the south near the border before settling in Bangkok. On 31 August 1957, the Federation of Malaya finally become independent from Britain, and has finally achieved on 16 September 1963, the union with Singapore was short-lived, lasting less than two years before it was expelled from Malaysia by separating it on 9 August 1965 as the "Republic of Singapore" as a full sovereign nation.

In early 1965, two Indonesian Marines blew up the Macdonald house building in Singapore (while it was still a part of Malaysia). They were arrested and sentenced to death. The execution took place in 1968, causing the Singapore embassy in Jakarta to be raided by 300 students.

After the independence of Indonesia in 1945 and the separation of Singapore from Malaysia in 1965, both countries opened bilateral diplomatic ties on 1966. In 1967, they founded ASEAN together with Thailand, Philippines and Malaysia, to strive for peace and stability in the region. Formal diplomatic relations was established between Singapore and Indonesia on 7 September 1967.

=== 50th anniversary of formal diplomatic relations ===
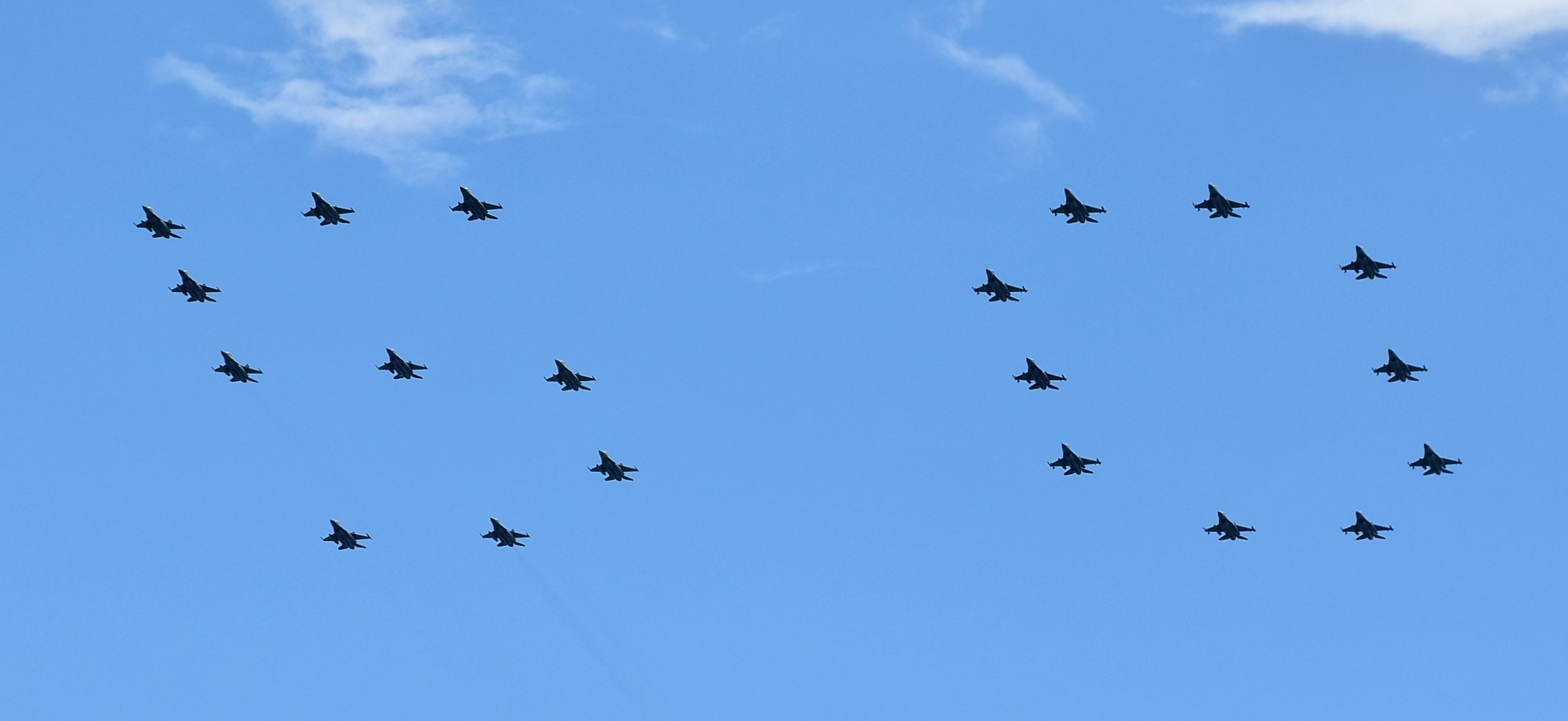
Fly past of joint Indonesian and Singaporean Air Forces F-16 fighter jets

The golden jubilee of Indonesia-Singapore diplomatic relations was marked by a series of events in August: A "four-eye" meeting between the two leaders, RISING50 book launch, joint commemorative stamps issue, tree planting at the Singapore Botanic Gardens. The first ever combined flypast of 20 fighter jets from the Republic of Singapore Air Force (RSAF) and Tentara Nasional Indonesia-Angkatan Udara (TNI-AU) was also held, in a formation of the number "50". On the economic front, an investment forum was held and nine memoranda of understandings (MOUs) were signed, including cooperations in education and research, student exchanges, environment and energy.

== Trade and commerce ==
Located on the busiest sea lane in Strait of Malacca, serving as one of world's main hub, trade with and through Singapore is important for Indonesia to provide the link to trade with the rest of the world. Vice versa, Indonesian business is also important for Singapore. Trade and commerce is the main common motivation of both nations foreign relations, each counterpart are main trade partners of each other.

Indonesia-Singapore trade volume reaches S$36 billion (US$29.32 billion). Singapore is Indonesia's top foreign investor, with a cumulative total of US$1.14 billion in 142 projects. Trade between the two countries also hit around $68 billion in 2010. At the same time, Indonesia's non-oil and gas exports to Singapore are the highest in the region.

The export of poultry meat from Indonesia to Singapore increased significantly after the 2022 Malaysian chicken export ban. A deal was agreed when on 30 June 2022, Singapore approved Indonesia as the country's new source of frozen and chilled chicken. On 21 July 2022, a second Indonesian company began supplying chickens to Singapore.

On 21 July 2022, Indonesia announced that they will be willing to set up a large chicken farm in Batam, a city in the Riau Islands, specifically for exports to Singapore. These chickens would be fresh as well, as Batam and Singapore are geographically close. It is believed that such a farm could begin operations in 2023. Similarly, Singapore already had a deal with Indonesia for years to import fresh pork from a farm located on an island close to Batam, known as Bulan Island. On 28 July 2022, another Indonesian firm announced that they will be setting up three farms on the island of Bintan to supply live chicken to Singapore starting from the end of that year.

== Tourism ==
Singapore is Indonesia's number one source of visitors with 1,373,126 visitors in 2010. Vice versa, Indonesia is also top source of visitors for Singapore, reaching 2,592,222 visitors in 2011.

Other than business purposes, Indonesian visitors attracted to Singapore mostly for shopping, city sightseeing, and island resorts with its theme parks, zoos, museums and gardens. While Singaporeans attracted to Indonesia mostly for its nature and culture, Bali and neighboring Batam island are particularly popular among Singapore visitors.

== Security and counter terrorism ==
In the 1990s, the RSAF's UAV Command assisted the TNI during a hostage rescue mission during the Mapenduma hostage crisis.

On 3 October 2005, Singaporean Prime Minister Lee Hsien Loong met Indonesian President Susilo Bambang Yudhoyono in Bali, just two days after the Bali bombings. They agreed to strengthen the fight against terrorism and also discussed cooperation in the fields of economy, trade, energy, and investment.

== Territorial and environment issues ==
Relations with Indonesia are generally good, though current outstanding issues include the bans on the export of sand and granite, both of which Singapore's construction industry is reliant on.

Singapore scarcity of land and spaces have led them to expand their island through land reclamations. The materials needed for reclamation, sands and granites, are mostly imported from Indonesia. The quarry of sands from Indonesian territories has raised concern over environmental issues.

In August 2005, Singapore and Indonesia signed a Memorandum of Understanding to expand aviation rights between the two countries.

In June 2013, Singapore suffered from the haze coming from slash-and-burn practice to clear plantation lands in neighboring countries Riau, Sumatra, and Indonesia. The June 2013 haze hit the worst record, reaching the highest haze pollutant levels since 1997. The haze prompted a health alert from the Singaporean government, angered Singaporean citizens, and also caused some diplomatic tension as the Singaporean government protested Indonesia's tardiness at handling the issue and urged the Indonesian government to look for effective measures to mitigate the transboundary haze pollution occurrence.

In addition, there has also been differences between both countries on the administration of the Riau Islands Flight Information Region (FIR). Singapore has generally claimed that it controls the FIR based on an arrangement made by the International Civil Aviation Organization, and that it is a matter of aviation safety and efficiency. However, some past and present Indonesian officials have argued against Singapore's right to do so, and reasoned that the FIR is a critical determinant of Indonesia's air sovereignty and defense.

In January 2022, the 5th Singapore–Indonesia Leader's Retreat held at Sanchaya Resort in Bintan saw the signing of three agreements addressing bilateral issues of FIR, defence cooperation, and extradition of fugitives, that are important to both sides. Under the agreement on airspace management, Singapore and Indonesia have agreed to realign the boundary between Jakarta Flight Information Region (FIR) and Singapore FIR. Indonesia will delegate to Singapore the provision of air navigation services in portions of the airspace within the realigned Jakarta FIR. This agreement will remain in force for 25 years and can be extended by mutual consent. Under the Defence Cooperation Agreement, Singapore and Indonesia will continue to strengthen defence partnerships and deepen cooperation in mutually beneficial areas. The agreement will be in force for 25 years. Under the Extradition Treaty, Singapore and Indonesia will grant extradition for a comprehensive list of extraditable offences covered by the treaty. The signing of agreements is seen to be a win-win outcome for both countries.

Since September 2026, Singapore has suffered from the haze due to the 2026 Indonesia wildfires.

== See also ==
- Indonesia–Singapore border
- Indonesia–Malaysia–Singapore Growth Triangle
- Riau Islands Flight Information Region
