= Rais Abin =

Indonesian military officer and diplomat (1926–2021)

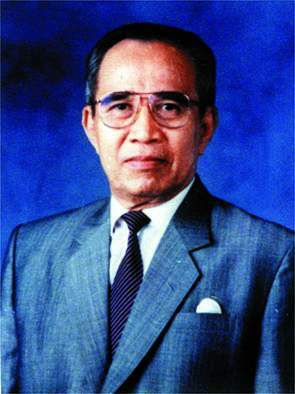

Member of the People's Consultative Assembly
- In office 1 October 1999 – 1 October 2004

11th Ambassador of Indonesia to Singapore
- In office 1984 – 25 August 1988
- President: Suharto
- Preceded by: Sudjatmiko
- Succeeded by: Tuk Setyohadi

Ambassador of Indonesia to Malaysia
- In office 6 August 1981 – 22 September 1984
- President: Suharto
- Preceded by: Makmun Murod
- Succeeded by: Himawan Soetanto

Personal details
- Born: 15 August 1926 Koto Gadang, Bukittinggi, Dutch East Indies
- Died: 25 March 2021 (aged 94) Gatot Soebroto Army Hospital, Jakarta, Indonesia
- Spouse: Dewi Asiah (m. 1951)
- Parents: Abin Sutan Mangkuto (father); Rangkayo Saadi binti Hamzah (mother)
- Education: Christian University of Indonesia (dropped out)

Military service
- Allegiance: Indonesia
- Branch/service: Army
- Years of service: 1945—1981
- Rank: Lieutenant General
- Battles/wars: Indonesian National Revolution

Rais Abin (15 August 1926 – 25 March 2021) was an Indonesian military officer and diplomat who served as the Commander of the Second United Nations Emergency Force in Egypt from 1976 until 1979, Indonesian Ambassador to Malaysia from 1981 until 1984, and Indonesian Ambassador to Singapore from 1984 until 1986.

== Early life and education ==
Rais Abin was born on 15 August 1926 as the son of Abin Sutan Mangkuto and Rangkayo Saadi binti Hamzah. His father worked as an intercity bus agent in Lubuk Sikaping, a job which barely fed him and his family. He went to Schakelschool (People's School, equivalent to elementary school) and graduated at the age of 14. Rais then continued to study at the Meer Uitgebreid Lager Onderwijs (equivalent to Junior High School) near Mount Singgalang. Although he passed the entrance test for the school, his father did not have enough money to pay for his tuition and put him instead at an agricultural junior high school in Sukabumi. Rais then took a ferry from the Port of Teluk Bayur to Sukabumi along with his cousin, Mishar. During his studies in the school, his father died in 1942, and he did not have a chance to visit his late father. He then graduated from the school in 1943 and was put as the assistant supervisor at Cikumpay rubber plantation in Purwakarta.

== Military career ==
Following the independence of Indonesia, Rais joined the Socialist Youth of Indonesia. He departed for Yogyakarta in September 1945 after being recommended by an armed railwayman. Rais then attended a recruitment station in the army headquarters. When asked about his interests, he stated that he was interested in foreign affairs. He then underwent a series of training related to foreign intelligence for five months. After that, he graduated with the rank of sergeant cadre in 1946 and was appointed as intel for weapons smuggling operations through the Dutch blockade and was sent to Tegal. Rais was then sent to Palembang to meet Adnan Kapau Gani, the military governor of South Sumatra who prepared the logistics for his intelligence operation. Shortly afterwards, Rais was promoted to second lieutenant and he was sent to Singapore to smuggle weapons. Rais was stationed in the 1st division, with General Sudirman as his commander.

On one of his mission he and his colleagues were arrested by a Dutch patrol in Bintan at the end of 1948. Rais and his colleagues became prisoners of war in Gunung Kijang, Bintan Island, for almost a year. They were freed after a prisoner exchange agreement was reached between the Dutch and Indonesians at the Roem–Van Roijen Agreement in May 1949. A peace agreement was reached between the Dutch and Indonesian parties at the Round Table Conference.

Rais continued his education after the peace agreement was made and went to study at the LPPU High School for two years. He also studied at the Faculty of Economics at the Christian University of Indonesia in 1952, although he dropped out two year later to pursue military career. He then attended the Indonesian Army Command and General Staff College for two years until he graduated in 1956 with the rank of major. He was then placed in the Nusa Tenggara Military Command as the Deputy Chief of Staff from 1956 until 1958. He was transferred to South Sulawesi in 1961 with the rank of lieutenant colonel and became part of the chief of staff to the Commander in Chief in South Sulawesi and Southeast Sulawesi.

After serving for two years in South Sulawesi, Rais Abin was instructed by his superior to pursue further military education in the Australian Army Staff College, Queenscliff. His Indonesian classmate in the college was Sarwo Edhie Wibowo. Rais used his time in the college to refine his English skills. They both graduated in 1964.

Rais was then stationed in Bandung with the rank of colonel. He held several positions during this time, such as instructor at the Infantry Center in Bandung and as assistant for management and control from 1965 and 1969. Four years later, he was stationed in Jakarta as a planning officer and member of the Strategic Studies Institute Army. Rais was promoted to brigadier general in 1973 and became the Deputy Commander of the Indonesian Army Command and General Staff College. During his tenure in the Army Command and General Staff College, he took courses at the National Resilience Institute and Defense and Security Management Institute.

== Second United Nations Emergency Force ==
=== Chief of Staff and Deputy Commander ===
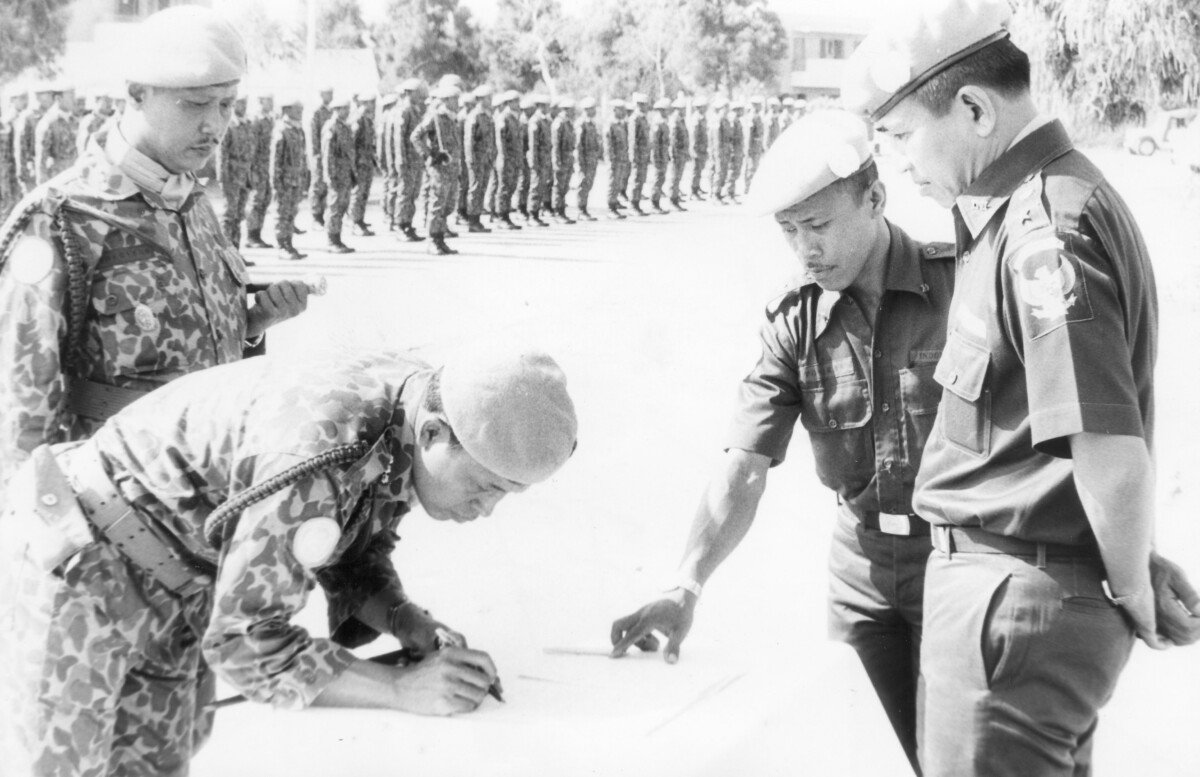
Rais Abin (right) as the Deputy Commander of the Second United Nations Emergency Force overseeing the transfer of command of the Indonesian battalion.

Rais was informed about his nomination to the post of the chief of staff of the Second United Nations Emergency Force while playing tennis with Himawan Sutanto. Susilo Sudarman, the assistant to the Commander-in-Chief of the Armed Forces at that time, Maraden Panggabean, called him to inform about the chief of staff matter. Himawan, who picked up the phone, recommended Rais Abin for the post, and quickly handed over the phone to Rais. Sudarman then informed Rais that although there are five other candidates competing for the post, he would be the most likely to held the post. Panggabean eventually approved Rais to held the post. Although his new post was a much better post from his previous one, he was unhappy because he felt that he would be better off as an instructor. Rais departed to Egypt, the location of the Second United Nations Emergency Force on 25 December 1976. He assumed his post as chief of staff on 4 January 1976. Rais later also assumed the post of the Deputy Commander of the Second United Nations Emergency Force on 5 June, making him an UN official.

One of his actions as the chief of staff was to take over the communications process with Egypt and Israel. The commander at that time, Bengt Liljestrand, experienced deadlock while trying to communicate formally with both sides. Rais then engaged on an intensive informal communication with liaison officers from Egypt named Maghdub and from Israel named Simon Levinson. At some point, Levinson invited him to visit Jerusalem along with his wife. Unexpectedly, Israel's minister of defence, Shimon Peres, also met him.

At the end of November 1976, Rais was told by the Chief Coordinator of the United Nations Peacekeeping Missions in the Middle East, Lieutenant General Ensio Siilasvuo, that Liljestrand would return home as he felt unhappy with the conditions in Egypt and Israel. Rais was then made as the Acting Commander of the Second United Nations Emergency Force on 1 December.

=== Acting Commander ===
While serving as the acting commander, the Under-Secretary-General of the United Nations for Special Political Affairs at that time, Brian Urquhart, kept pushing for the definitive appointment of Rais. Although Rais was sure that Egypt would be mostly happy with his appointment, Israel would definitely oppose his candidacy due to Indonesia having no diplomatic relations with Israel. Urquhart then held a special lobby to Israel, stating that he has no other candidate other than Rais. Although Israel was finally convinced by Urquhart and approved Rais, Rais was still unsure and he flew by himself to Israel. There, he met Shimon Peres, who stated that "....[this appointment] violates the precedents, but general (Rais, red.) is the best choice [for this task]. Go ahead, enjoy your duty."

=== Commander ===
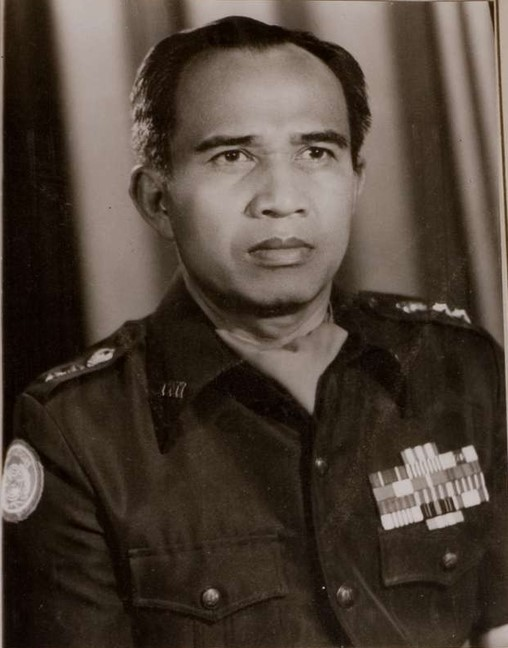
Major General Rais Abin, Commander of the Second United Nations Emergency Force

Rais assumed his post as the commander on 1 January 1977. He was automatically given the title of Under-Secretary-General, meaning that he could contact the Secretary General of the United Nations at any time.

Rais had to face multiple problems during his commandership career. He received backlash from the United Nations Civil Staff Workers Union after one of his commander's secretary was dismissed by him. The secretary was dismissed after being found having an affair with his chief of staff. Another problem was the "hospital schism", where UN soldiers from Western Bloc countries would be treated at hospitals in Israel, while soldiers from Eastern Bloc countries would be treated at hospitals in Egypt.

One of his unpopular actions as the commander was to contact the Israel authorities in his capacity as an UN official. Rais often visited Israel's Knesset and met with Israel's prime minister Menachem Begin. He also met with President Anwar Saddat of Egypt. The two countries finally reached an agreement after Anwar Saddat visited Jerusalem, the capital of Israel, in October 1977, and delivered a speech in front of the Knesset a month later. Both countries finally reached a peace treaty at the US-brokered Camp David Accords on 17 September 1978. Rais ended his duty on 11 September 1979.

== Assistant to the Commander-in-Chief ==
After returning to Indonesia, Rais received a letter that Brian Urquhart requested to the government to deploy him at another UN peacekeeping mission in Namibia. Rais Abin made a letter rejecting the offer and he was made by Commander-in-Chief of the Armed Forces Mohammad Jusuf as his personal staff. After four months without any formal posts, Rais was made as the Assistant for Politics, Strategy, and General Planning in 1980. He held the post for a year, as in 1981 he had reached the mandatory military retirement age.

== Political career ==
After retiring from the military, Rais was appointed by President Suharto as the Indonesian Ambassador to Malaysia and was inaugurated on 6 August 1981. He was promoted from the rank of major general to lieutenant general two days after his appointment. Rais oversaw the 1982 election for Indonesians in Malaysia. The ruling party in Indonesia, Golkar, lost in the country with only 40% of the votes, resulting in him being questioned by Leonardus Benjamin Moerdani, the Head of the Strategic Intelligence Agency at that time. Although most ambassadors at that time would have been removed from their post with such electoral loss, Rais still maintained his post for another two years until 22 September 1984. Afterwards, he was moved from Malaysia and became Indonesian Ambassador to Singapore from September 1984 until 25 August 1988.

Rais returned from Malaysia to Indonesia and held the office of the Director of the Bumi Daya Bank in 1981. In 1991, he was made as the Secretary General of the Non-Aligned Movement Summit for a one-year term. His main task was to prepare the 10th Non-Aligned Movement Summit, which was held in Jakarta in 1992.

Rais was appointed by the General Elections Commission as a member of the People's Consultative Assembly from the groups delegation, representing veterans. Rais was inaugurated on 1 October 1999 for a five-year term. Rais was one of the members of the assembly who refused to report his wealth to the Commission for the Supervision of State Officials' Wealth. He argued that reporting his wealth to the committee "were of no use" and that it would be better for the committee to eradicate corruption instead of inspecting the wealth of state officials.

== Veteran's organization ==
Rais had been a member of the Veterans' Legion of Indonesia since his retirement in 1981. Rais Abin was appointed as the head of the politics and security affairs of the Veterans' Legion of Indonesia. He was elected as the chairman of the organization at its 9th congress in 2007 and again at the 10th congress in 2012. Although he had announced his intentions to resign at the 11th congress in 2017, his successors, Ari Sudewo and Sukotjo Tjokroatmodjo died before the congress was held and he was elected for the third time. He eventually passed the chairman seat to Saiful Sulun in 2019. After his resignation, Rais was made as the Honorary Chairman of the organization until his death.

Rais also held the seat of the Presiden of VECONAC (Veterans Confederation of ASEAN Countries) from 2010 until 2012.

== Personal life ==
Rais was married to Dewi Asiah on 20 September 1951. Dewi's mother, Ratu Aminah, was a women's rights activist who became an MP and Deputy Speaker of the Constitutional Assembly of Indonesia, while her father, Hidajat Martaatmadja, was a military officer with the rank of lieutenant general and had served several cabinet posts in Sukarno's government. The marriage resulted in three children, namely Radianti Lukman, Radimita Manusama Rais Abin, and Andy Achmad Hidayat.

== Death ==
Rais Abin died at 21:39 on 25 March 2021 in the Gatot Soebroto Army Hospital. He was buried the next day at the Kalibata Heroes' Cemetery with a ceremony led by the Deputy Chief of Staff of the Army Bakti Agus Fadjari.
