= Hotmangaradja Pandjaitan =

Indonesian diplomat and military officer (born 1953)

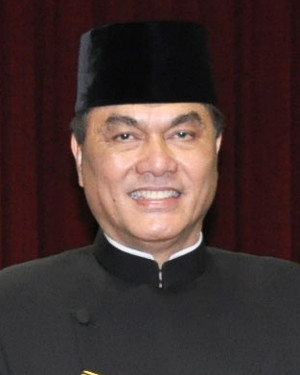
- Pandjaitan in 2014

Ambassador of Indonesia to Singapore
- Incumbent
- Assumed office 8 October 2025
- President: Prabowo Subianto
- Preceded by: Suryopratomo

Ambassador of Indonesia to France
- In office 15 October 2014 – 7 January 2019
- President: Susilo Bambang Yudhoyono; Joko Widodo
- Preceded by: Rezlan Ishar Jenie
- Succeeded by: Arrmanatha Christiawan Nasir

Secretary to the Coordinating Ministry of Political, Security, and Legal Affairs
- In office 5 May 2010 – 2012
- Preceded by: Romulo Simbolon
- Succeeded by: Langgeng Sulistiyono

Personal details
- Born: 14 October 1953 (age 73) Palembang, South Sumatra, Indonesia
- Spouse: Catharina Dwi Astuti
- Children: 2
- Parents: D. I. Pandjaitan (father); Marieke boru Tambunan (mother)
- Education: Indonesian Military Academy; Indonesian Open University; Sahid University; Padjadjaran University

Military service
- Allegiance: Indonesia
- Branch/service: Indonesian Army
- Years of service: 1977–2012
- Rank: Lieutenant general
- Unit: Kopassus

Hotmangaradja Pontas Pandjaitan (born 14 October 1953) is an Indonesian retired army general and diplomat who is currently the ambassador to Singapore since 2025. Prior to his current ambassadorship, he had served in diplomatic postings as military attaché in Berlin from 1997 to 2000 and ambassador to France from 2014 to 2019. His last military posting was secretary to the coordinating ministry of political, security, and legal affairs from 2010 to 2012.

== Early life and education ==
Hotmangaradja was born on 14 October 1953 at a military hospital in Palembang, South Sumatra, as the fourth child of six of national hero D. I. Pandjaitan and Marieke boru Tambunan. At the time of his birth, Hotmangaradja's father was serving as the chief of staff of the South Sumatra (Sriwijaya) territorial army command. During his childhood, Hotmangaradja was affectionately known with the nickname Oce.

Hotmangaradja lost his father at the age of 12 after his assassination in the 30 September Movement. When his father was about to be buried, Hotmangaradja suddenly shouted a pledge to continue his father's service, to the awe of the attendees. His brother later expressed similar interest to enter the army, but their mother suggested that only one of them pursue a military career. According to his mother, Salomo and Hotmangaraja agreed to decide by drawing lots, which was won by Hotmangaradja. Hotmangaradja then informed about his decision to his guidance counselor when he was about to graduate from high school, which made his counselor flabbergasted as Hotmangaraja had been guided to apply for the Bandung Institute of Technology. His guidance counselor eventually relented, and Hotmangaradja entered the military academy in 1974.

During his service in the military, Hotmangaradja pursued further higher education. He has a bachelor's degree in public administration from the Indonesian Open University and in law from the Sahid University. He received his master's and doctoral degree from the Padjadjaran University.

== Military career ==
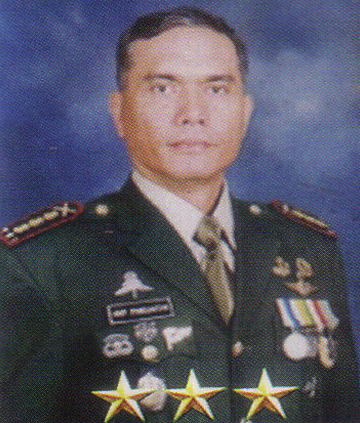
Hotmangaradja's official portrait as commander of the Wirasatya military area

Hotmangaradja completed his military education and began his service with the rank of second lieutenant of the infantry corps in 1977. After completing basic infantry and command courses, Hotmangaradja joined the Kopassus, where he held various commandant and staff roles. In 1981, Hotmangaradja, along with future president Prabowo Subianto and some twenty officers, attended a six-week anti-terrorism course at West Germany’s GSG 9. His first position outside of Kopassus was as the military attaché in Germany from 1997 to 2000, a post that his father also held from 1960 to 1962. Upon his service in Berlin, Hotmangaradja was appointed as commander of the Kopassus 4th group from 2000 to April 2001, when it was renamed to the 3rd group. He served until May 2002, when he became the commander of the Wirasatya military area, covering the province of Bali. The 2002 Bali bombings, which killed more than 200 people, occurred during his tenure.

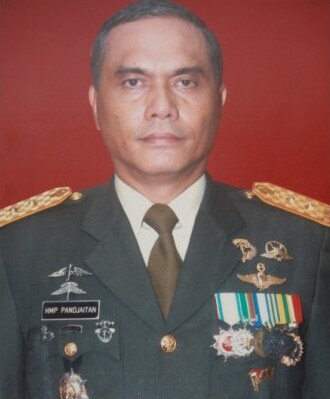
Hotmangaradja as the commander of the army's territorial center

In February 2004, Hotmangaradja was appointed as the spokesperson of the army (his official title was the chief of army information services), which was his first flag officer post. He was promoted to the rank of brigadier general shortly afterwards, and served until 24 February 2006. Hotmangaradja briefly served as the deputy assistant for territorial affairs for a few months in 2006 before his promotion to the commander of the army's territorial center was announced on 12 September 2006. He officially assumed his duties on 19 September and soon after received the rank of major general. In 2007, Hotmangaradja was named as a nominee for the commanding general of Kopassus. He was not appointed and was instead named as the assistant for territorial affairs to the army chief of staff on 4 September that year.

After serving within the army headquarters for around three years, on 29 May 2008 Hotmangaradja was named as the commander of the Udayana regional military command, covering Bali, East Nusa Tenggara, and West Nusa Tenggara. He was sworn in for the post on 26 June, where he pledged to increase security and conduct continuous monitoring to prevent sectarian conflicts. Shortly after his appointment, Hotmangaradja ordered the tightening of security in the Indonesia–Timor-Leste border through the deployment of military units under his command following the release of the peace and friendship commission, which investigates the 1999 East Timorese crisis. Similar measures were also implemented around the time of the anniversary of the Bali bombings and the ASEAN Beach Game, and execution of the Bali bombings perpetrator. In 2009, Hotmangaradja gathered the rajas of Bali, where he introduced military institutions in Bali and put forward the proposal on the construction of the Udayana Warmadewa statue, the regional military command's namesake, at the military command's headquarters. Hotmangaradja denied any political or electoral motives in gathering the rajas. Hotmangaradja ended his tenure as commander on 9 April 2010.

Shortly after being relieved from his position, on 25 March 2010 Hotmangaradja was promoted as the secretary to the coordinating ministry of political, security, and legal affairs, a three-star position, effective 1 April 2010. Hotmangaradja was installed for the new position on 5 May 2010 and was promoted to the rank of lieutenant general on 11 June 2010. In 2011, Hotmangaradja ran for the chairmanship of the Indonesian Motor Association, but was not elected. On the same year, Hotmangaradja was named as a strong contender for the position of the army chief of staff. After his retirement from active service in 2012, Hotmangaradja founded the Democracy Integrity for Peace (DIP) Institute, a think tank on political, defense, and security matters, and became its president.

== Diplomatic career ==
On 15 October 2014, Hotmangaradja was installed as the ambassador of Indonesia to France, with concurrent accreditation to Andorra, Monaco, and the UNESCO. Hotmangaradja arrived in Paris on 16 December 2014 and held a discussion with the Indonesian student union in France four days later, in which he emphasized the use of soft power to transform the diplomacy paradigm from "introducing" to "presenting" Indonesia to the French society. He presented his credentials to the President of France François Hollande on 29 January 2015, Director-General of UNESCO Irina Bokova on 24 February, co-prince of Andorra Joan Enric Vives i Sicília on 15 May, Albert II, Prince of Monaco on 18 June, and co-prince of Andorra François Hollande on 19 October. Throughout the early 2015, Hotmangaradja was summoned by French foreign minister Laurent Fabius multiple times to negotiate the death sentence of Serge Atlaoui, a Frenchman who was indicted for drug trafficking.

During his tenure, Hotmangaradja strengthened ties with France through cooperation in vocational education and on renewable energy. He also organized the maiden Indonesia-Monaco gala dinner at the Fairmont Jakarta hotel in 2016, which was attended by Prince Albert II. As Indonesia's permanent representative to the UNESCO, Hotmangaradja secured Indonesia's membership bid for the UNESCO executive board in 2017. Hotmangaradja ended his ambassadorial tenure on 7 January 2019.

On 6 December 2019, Hotmangaradja was appointed as special assistant II to defense minister Prabowo Subianto, with responsibilities covering strategic environment and inter-institutional relations. After Prabowo Subianto was elected as president, he nominated Hotmangaradja as ambassador to Singapore. During his assessment by the House of Representative's first commission on 5 July 2025, Hotmangaradja was questioned regarding his plans to implement the president's goal in the context of Indonesia–Singapore relations. He was sworn in as ambassador on 8 October 2025. He arrived in Singapore on 22 January 2026 and presented his credentials to president Tharman Shanmugaratnam five days later.

== Personal life ==
Hotmangaraja is married to Dwi Astuti. The couple has two sons, Abraham Sada Mangaraja and Jeremia Sesa Mangaraja, who followed their father's service in the army.

Diplomatic posts
Preceded by Suryopratomo	Ambassador of Indonesia to Singapore; 2025–present	Incumbent
