= List of ambassadors of Indonesia to Singapore =

Ambassador of Indonesia to Singapore
- Duta Besar Indonesia untuk Singapura
- Emblem of the Ministry of Foreign Affairs
- Incumbent; Hotmangaradja Pandjaitan since 8 October 2025
- Ministry of Foreign Affairs; Embassy of Indonesia, Singapore
- Seat: Singapore
- Appointer: President of Indonesia
- Inaugural holder: Mohamad Razif
- Formation: 1950
- Website: kemlu.go.id/singapore/id

The following are the list of Indonesian diplomats that served as Ambassador of the Republic of Indonesia to Singapore.

No.	Portrait	Ambassador	From	Until	Sworn-in by	Ref.
1		Mohamad Razif; Consul General	1950	1954	Soekarno	
2		Hermen Kartowisastro; Consul General	1954	1956	Soekarno	
3		Ahmad Natanegara; Consul General	1956	1958	Soekarno	
4		G.P.H. Djatikusumo; Consul General	1958	1960	Soekarno	
5		Sugih Arto; Consul General	1961	1963	Soekarno	
6		Abdul Rahman Ramly	1967	1969	Soekarno	
7		Soenarso	1969	1972	Soeharto	
8		Rukmito Hendraningrat	1972	1976	Soeharto	
9		Chaeruddin Tasning	1976	1978	Soeharto	
10		Sudjatmiko	1978	1984	Soeharto	
11		Rais Abin	1984	1988	Soeharto	
12		Tuk Setyohadi	1988	1992	Soeharto	
13		Soedibyo Rahardjo	1992	1996	Soeharto	
14		Herman Bernhard Leopold Mantiri	1996	1999	Soeharto	
15		Luhut Binsar Pandjaitan	1999	2000	B.J. Habibie	
16		Johan S. Syahperi	2000	2002	Abdurrahman Wahid	
17		Mochamad Slamet Hidayat	12 June 2003	February 2006	Megawati Soekarnoputri	
18		Wardana	February 2006	21 December 2011	Susilo Bambang Yudhoyono	
19		Andri Hadi	21 December 2011	23 December 2015	Susilo Bambang Yudhoyono	
20		I Gede Ngurah Swajaya	23 December 2015	14 September 2020	Joko Widodo	
21		Suryopratomo	14 September 2020 (Credential: 24 November 2020)	8 October 2025	Joko Widodo	
22		Hotmangaradja Pandjaitan	8 October 2025	Incumbent	Prabowo Subianto	

== See also ==
- Embassy of Indonesia, Singapore
- List of Indonesian ambassadors
- List of diplomatic missions of Indonesia
- Indonesia–Singapore relations
