= ICCI =

ICCI is a four-letter acronym that stands for:

- Islamic Cultural Centre of Ireland, an Islamic complex, including a mosque, in Clonskeagh, Dublin, Ireland
- Iowa Citizens for Community Improvement, a membership-based grassroots organization based in Des Moines, Iowa
- Islamabad Chamber of Commerce & Industry
- The International Cryosphere Climate Initiative, a scientific advocacy organisation in Vermont, USA
