= Adam Mulawarman Tugio =

Indonesian diplomat (born 1965)

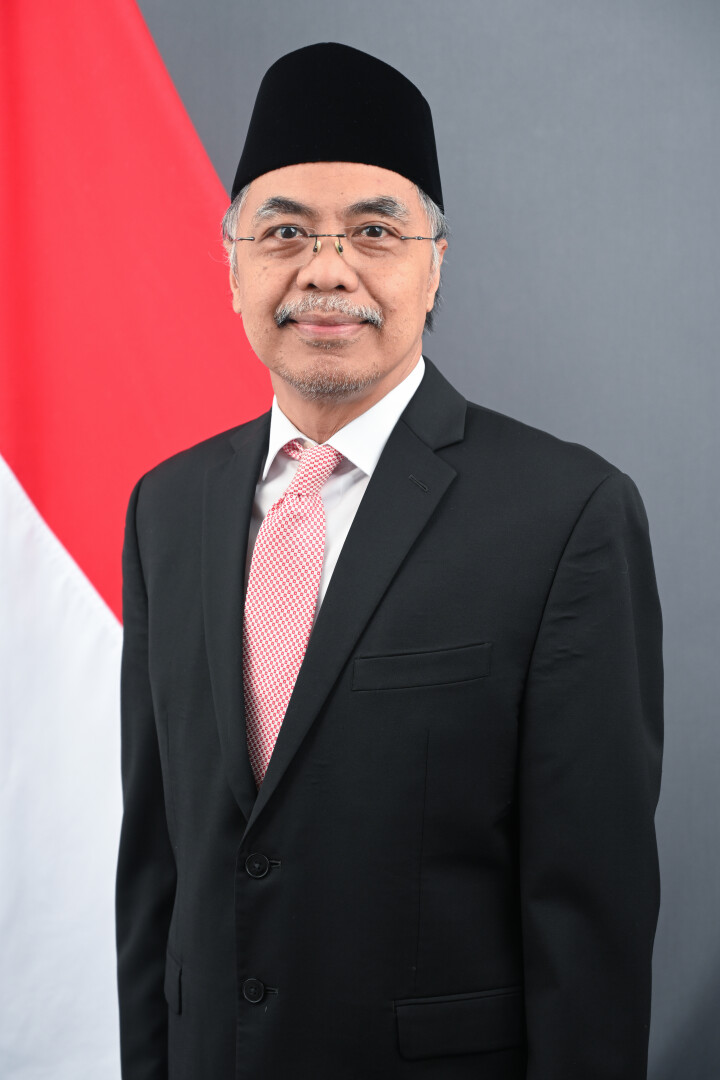

Ambassador of Indonesia to Vietnam
- Incumbent
- Assumed office 8 October 2025
- President: Prabowo Subianto
- Preceded by: Denny Abdi

Ambassador of Indonesia to Pakistan
- In office 14 September 2020 – 30 November 2023
- President: Joko Widodo
- Preceded by: Iwan Suyudhie Amri
- Succeeded by: Chandra Warsenanto Sukotjo

Personal details
- Born: September 11, 1965 (age 60)
- Spouse: Irina Eka Mauliyanti
- Education: University of Indonesia; American University

Adam Mulawarman Tugio (born 11 September 1965) is an Indonesian diplomat who is currently serving as ambassador to Vietnam since 2025. He previously served as ambassador to Pakistan from 2020 to 2023 and advisor (expert staff) to the foreign minister from 2023 until 2026.

== Early life and education ==
Adam was born on 11 September 1965. He completed his law studies at the University of Indonesia in 1990 and received his master's degree on the same subject from the American University in 1996.

== Career ==
Adam's diplomatic career began upon completing his junior diplomatic training in 1991 as a staff in the directorate of Northern American affairs. He was then assigned to the political section at Indonesia's consulate in West Berlin with the rank of third secretary. He returned to the foreign ministry as chief of maritime law and delimitation within the Directorate of International Treaties, before returning for an overseas stint at the political affairs desk at the permanent mission of Indonesia to the United Nations with the rank of counsellor. During this period, he completed his mid-career diplomatic training in 2002, and senior diplomatic training in 2007.

Upon service in New York, Adam returned to the Directorate of International Treaties, before serving again in the United States as coordinator for public affairs at the embassy in Washington, D.C. with the rank of counsellor. He was then assigned to the foreign ministry's secretariat general as chief of general affairs from 2014 to 2016. On 13 May 2016, he became foreign ministry's director of North and Central America. He was re-installed as the director for the 1st American region on 3 January 2017 following reorganization within the foreign ministry. He served for a few month and was sent to the embassy in London as deputy chief of mission and head of chancellery.

In May 2020, Adam was nominated as ambassador to Pakistan by President Joko Widodo. After passing an assessment by the house of representative's first commission the next month, on 14 September 2020 he officially assumed office. He presented his credentials to the President of Pakistan Arif Alvi on 3 November 2020. His tenure involved navigating Pakistan's political instability following the ouster of Prime Minister Imran Khan, addressing security concerns related to terrorism, and managing the economic challenges faced by Pakistan.He also worked to expand trade relations, particularly focusing on palm oil exports, and facilitated Indonesian investment in Pakistan, including the establishment of an Indomie factory. He also introduced Indonesia to the Pakistan public through initiatives such as seminars, online internship programs, and cultural exchanges.

For his work as an ambassador, he received the social media award from the foreign ministry for two consecutive years in 2022 and 2023 and the Global Ambassador Award in 2022. Shortly prior to his departure, the Islamabad Chamber of Commerce and Industry also proposed that the Pakistani government award him the highest civil award for his contributions to strengthening bilateral relations.

Upon serving as ambassador to Pakistan, on 12 September 2023 Adam was appointed as the foreign minister's advisor for politics, law, and security. He began his duties after returning to Indonesia on 30 November. Adam was nominated for ambassador to Vietnam by President Prabowo Subianto in July 2025 and was approved by the House of Representatives in a session on 8 July 2025. He was installed as ambassador on 8 October 2025 and presented his credentials to president Lương Cường 6 February 2026.

== Personal life ==
Adam is married to Irina Eka Mauliyanti.
