= Chandra Warsenanto Sukotjo =

Indonesian diplomat and military officer (born 1965)

Lieutenant General (Ret.) His Excellency Chandra Warsenanto Sukotjo
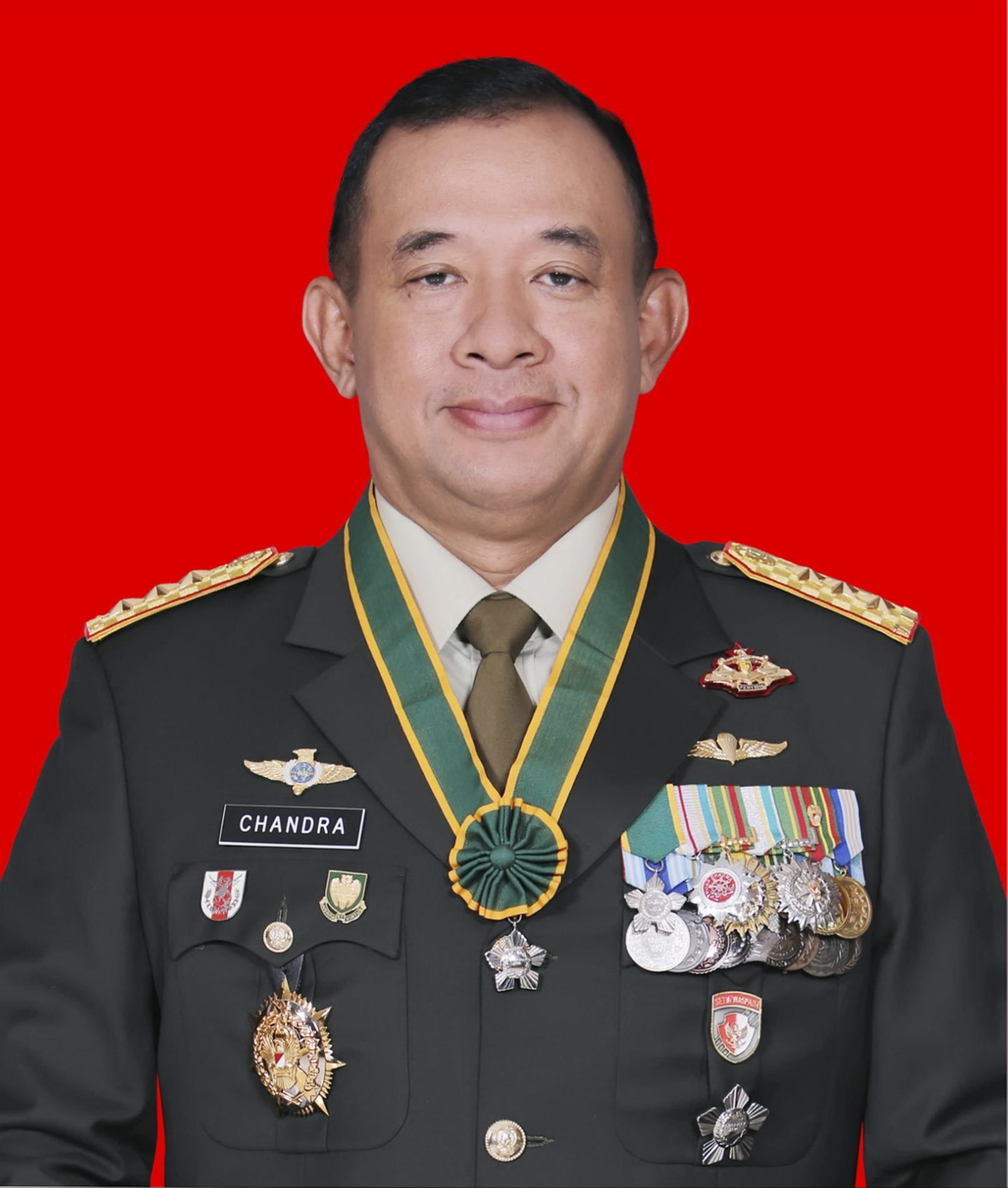
- Sukotjo in 2021

Ambassador of Indonesia to Pakistan
- Incumbent
- Assumed office 24 March 2025
- Preceded by: Adam Mulawarman Tugio

Personal details
- Born: 14 January 1965 (age 61) Bandung, West Java, Indonesia

Military service
- Branch/service: Indonesian Army
- Years of service: 1988–2023
- Rank: Lieutenant general
- Unit: Army Military Police Corps

Chandra Warsenanto Sukotjo (born 14 January 1965) is an Indonesian retired military officer and diplomat who is currently serving as Indonesia's ambassador to Pakistan. Prior to his diplomatic service, he was the commander of the army military police from 2021 to 2023, and held the final rank of lieutenant general upon his retirement.

== Early life and education ==
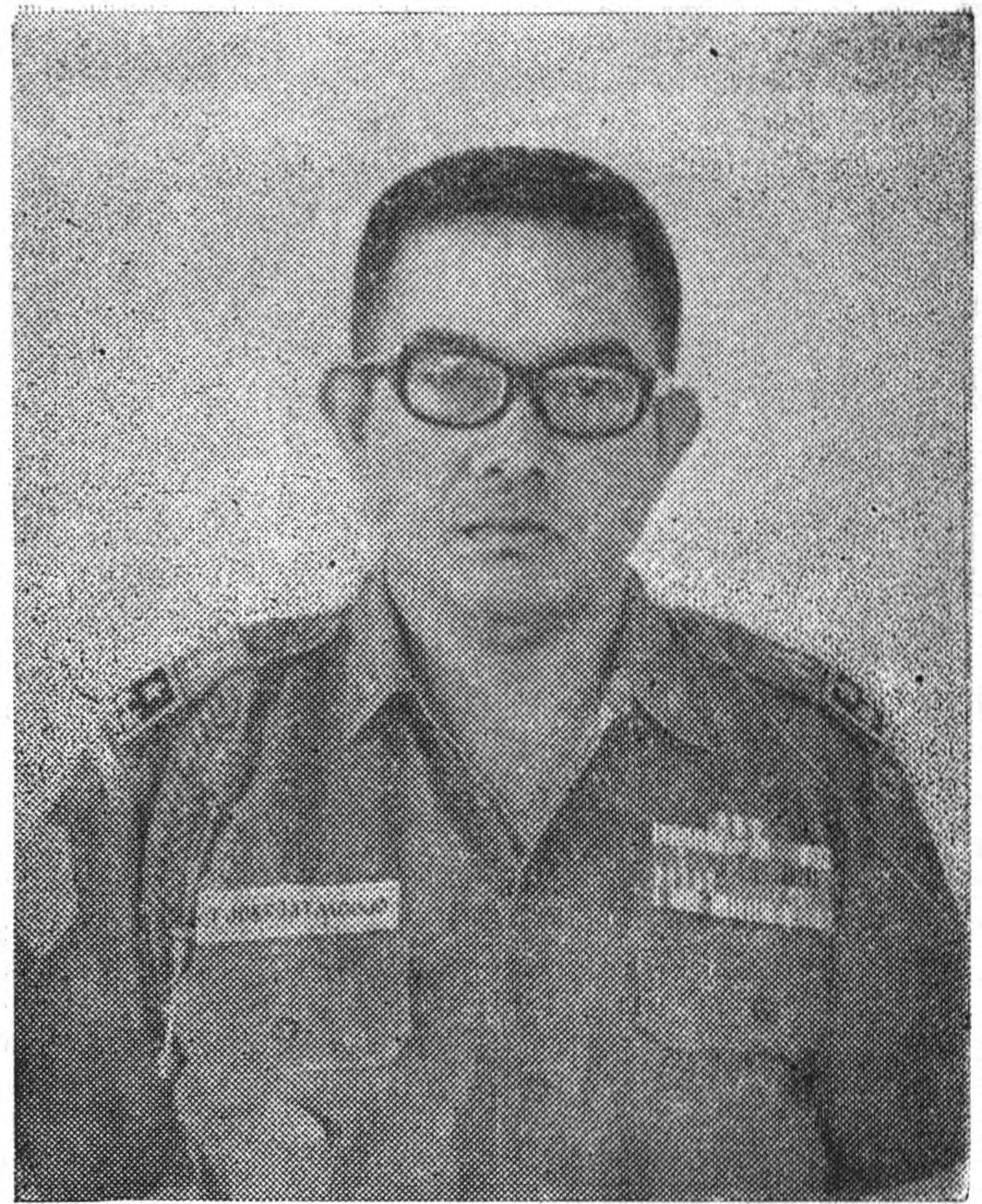
Sukotjo Tjokroatmodjo, Chandra's father.

Sukotjo was born on 14 January 1965 in Bandung as the eldest son of Sukotjo Tjokroatmodjo, an Indonesian National Revolution veteran and former inspector general of the department of education and culture, with her wife Sri Koestijah. He completed his basic education at the 4th Jakarta State High School in 1984 before continuing his education to the Indonesian Military Academy. He completed his military education in 1988 and was commissioned as a second lieutenant in the army military police. He attended a basic military course on the same year before taking a number of advanced military police courses in 1994 and 1998. He also received general military education in the Indonesian Army Command and General Staff College in 2001, the Indonesian National Armed Forces Command and General Staff College in 2012, and the prestigious National Resilience Institute in 2015. He received a master's degree in international relations from the Institute of Defence and Strategic Studies (now the S. Rajaratnam School of International Studies) in 2004 with a thesis titled Implications of Indonesia's military transformation: a view for the future.

== Military career ==
His professional journey commenced as a second lieutenant, serving as the deputy chief of military discipline enforcement installation in South Sumatra's army military police in 1989. Afterwards, he was sent to Namibia as part of the United Nations Transition Assistance Group from 1989 to 1990. He then became the head of law enforcement implementation for the military police detachment in Palembang from 1993 to 1995 before being promoted to captain. As a captain, Sukotjo held key roles within the South Sumatra's army military police, including chief of traffic discipline and guidance section from 1994 to 1995, and chief of criminal investigation and intelligence in 1996 to 1997. Around this time, he became part of the United Nations Observer Mission in Georgia from 1995 to 1996.

After attending an advanced military police course, Sukotjo was promoted to the rank of major and was transferred to the Presidential Security Force. He commanded the motorcycle escort detachment in the group responsible for state guests from 1998 to 1999, during the final days of President Suharto and President B. J. Habibie's tenure. He was then transferred to the group responsible for directly safeguarding the president. Serving President Abdurrahman Wahid, Sukotjo commanded the president's special security detachment from 1999 to 2000 and the president's personal security detachment from 2000 to 2001.

Sukotjo was promoted to the rank of lieutenant colonel after finishing his military education at the Indonesian Army Command and General Staff College. He was entrusted to command the military police detachment in Bone Regency in South Sulawesi for a few months in 2002 before being transferred to the military police detachment in Makassar, South Sulawesi's capital, from 2002 to 2003. Upon completing his master's degree, Sukotjo was reassigned to East Java, where he commanded the military police detachment in Surabaya, the province's capital, from 2004 to 2006.

He then moved to the army military police headquarters, serving as the chief of discipline section in directorate of law enforcement and discipline development from 2006 to 2007. At the same time, he took part in the United Nations Mission in the Sudan. Afterwards, he was assigned to the State Intelligence Agency as a senior assistant officer for foreign military intelligence from 2007 to 2008. He was then assigned to the armed forces intelligence agency, where he served as a senior assistant officer in the agency's directorate for foreign intelligence in 2008.

Sukotjo was promoted to the rank of colonel in 2008 as a senior trainer in the armed forces intelligence agency's main unit. In 2009, Sukotjo received his first diplomatic assignment as a military attaché at the Embassy of Indonesia, Ankara, from 2009 to 2012. During his tenure, Sukotjo oversaw the arrival of KRI Hasanuddin in the Mersin port and visit by Indonesian Armed Forces Commander Admiral Agus Suhartono to military facilities and production factories.

Sukotjo returned to Indonesia in 2012, serving as director of law enforcement and discipline development of the army military police center until 2013. On 15 November 2013, he was installed as the commander of the East Java army military police. He served for barely half a year, as on 4 July 2014 he handed over his post. He returned to the State Intelligence Agency as the chief of the Pacific region subdirectorate for a few months in 2014. On 5 September 2014, the armed forces commander issued a decree which promoted Sukotjo to the director of the America and Europe continent in the agency. He subsequently received the rank of brigadier general on 3 October. About a month after his promotion, on 31 October he was appointed as the agency's representative in Australia, serving as the first secretary for political affairs at the Embassy of Indonesia, Canberra. For his works in the army, on 20 January 2016 Sukotjo received the Grand Meritorious Military Order Star, 3rd class (Bintang Yudha Dharma Nararya) from the armed forces commander.

After three years in Australia, Sukotjo received another promotion as the deputy for foreign intelligence affairs in the State Intelligence Agency on 23 February 2017. He received his second star on 5 May that year. During his tenure, he was appointed as a member of the Board of Commissioners of the Pertamina International Exploration and Production on 13 March 2020. His appointment was extended in 2023.

On 26 January 2021, Sukotjo was promoted as the commander of the army military police. He was installed for the post on 8 February and was promoted to the rank of lieutenant general eighteen days later. During his tenure, he launched an investigation into Junior Tumilaar, his classmate in the military academy.

== Government career ==
Sukotjo entered retirement with his assignment to the army headquarters on 19 January 2023. He officially handed over his post to army chief of staff Dudung Abdurachman on 30 January, and the post remained vacant until now, with Sukotjo's deputy Eka Wijaya Permana acting as the top official in the army military police. He was nominated by the army as the inspector general to the Ministry of Fisheries and Maritime Affairs, but his named was sidelined and the ministry appointed an official from the state audit board for the post instead.

In August 2024, President Joko Widodo nominated Sukotjo as Indonesia's ambassador to Pakistan. He passed a fit and proper test held by the House of Representative's first commission in September that year. He was installed by President Prabowo Subianto on 24 March 2025. He presented his credentials to President of Pakistan Asif Ali Zardari on 22 August 2025.

== Personal life ==
Chandra is married to Tamara Yuanita, his childhood sweetheart during high school. The couple has two daughters.
