= United Nations Emergency Force II =

1973–1979 peacekeeping force in Egypt

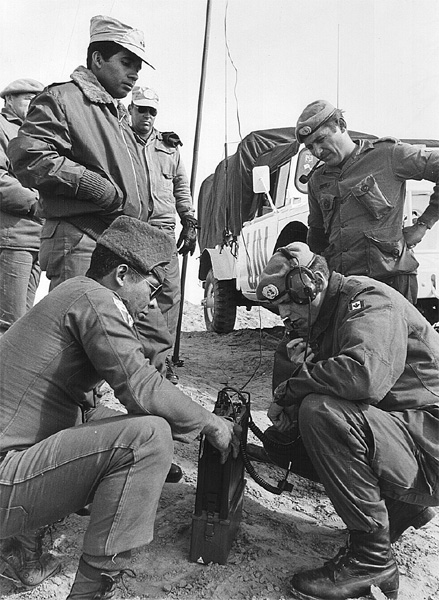
Canadian and Panamanian UNEF UN peacekeepers in the Sinai, 1974

The Second United Nations Emergency Force (UNEF II) was established by United Nations General Assembly, in accordance with United Nations Security Council Resolution 340 (1973), to supervise the ceasefire between Egyptian and Israeli forces at the end of Yom Kippur War (also known as the October War), and following of the agreement of 18 January 1974 and 4 September 1975, to supervise the redeployment of Egyptian and Israeli forces and to man and control the buffer zones established under those agreements. The force was withdrawn in July 1979.

== History ==
The mandate of UNEF II was to supervise the implementation of United Nations Security Council Resolution 340 which demanded that an immediate and complete ceasefire between Egyptian and Israeli forces be observed and that the parties return to the positions they had occupied at 1650 hours GMT on 22 October 1973. The UN Force was tasked to use its best efforts to prevent a recurrence of the fighting, and in the fulfillment of its mandate would have the cooperation of the military observers of the United Nations Truce Supervision Organization (UNTSO). UNEF II was also to cooperate with the International Committee of the Red Cross (ICRC) in its humanitarian endeavours in the area.

The mandate of UNEF II, which was originally approved for six months, until 24 April 1974, was subsequently renewed eight times. Each time, as the date of expiry of the mandate approached, the Secretary-General submitted a report to the United Nations Security Council on the activities of the Force during the period of the mandate. In each of those reports, the Secretary-General expressed the view that the continued presence of UNEF II in the area was essential, and he recommended, after consultations with the parties, that its mandate be extended for a further period. In each case, the Council took note of the Secretary-General's report and decided to extend the mandate of the Force accordingly. In October 1978, the mandate of UNEF II was extended a final time for nine months, until 24 July 1979.

The area of operation of the UNEF II was at Suez Canal sector and later the Sinai Peninsula, with the headquarters located at Cairo (October 1973 to August 1974) and Ismaïlia (August 1974 – July 1979). The deployment of forces as of July 1979 was as follows:

- Buffer zone 1 (boundary: Mediterranean Sea, line J, line M and line E)
  - Swedbatt (Swedish battalion)
  - Ghanbatt (Ghanaian battalion)
  - Indbatt (Indonesian battalion)
- Bufferzone 2A (boundary: Bufferzone 1, line M, bufferzone 2B, and Gulf of Suez)
  - Indbatt (Indonesian battalion)
  - Finbatt (Finnish battalion)
- Bufferzone 2B (boundary: bufferzone 2A, line M, Gulf of Suez)
  - Finbatt (Finnish battalion)

=== Strength ===
- Maximum, February 1974 : 6,973 military personnel, supported by international and local civilian staff
- At withdrawal, July 1979 : 4,045 military personnel, supported by international and local civilian staff.

== Force commanders ==
- Lieutenant-General Ensio P. H. Siilasvuo (Finland) (26 October 1973 – 20 August 1975)
- Lieutenant-General Bengt Liljestrand (Sweden) (20 August 1975 – 1 December 1976)
- Major-General Rais Abin (Indonesia) (acting) (1 December 1976 – 31 December 1976)
- Major-General Rais Abin (Indonesia) (1 January 1977 – 11 September 1979)

== Contributing countries ==
Contributors of military personnel were: Australia (air unit/helicopters and personnel), Austria (infantry), Canada (logistics/ signals air and service units), Finland (troops/infantry), Ghana (troops/infantry), Indonesia (troops/infantry), Ireland (troops/infantry), India (troops/infantry), Yugoslavia (troops/infantry), Nepal (troops/infantry), Panama (troops/infantry), Peru (troops/infantry), Poland (logistics/ engineering medical and transport unit), Senegal (troops/infantry), and Sweden (troops/infantry).
