= Bengt Liljestrand =

Swedish Army officer

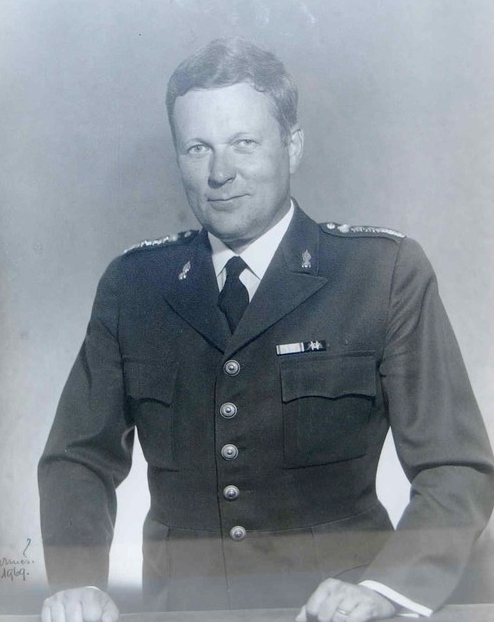
- Liljestrand in 1969.
- Born: 26 February 1919; Stockholm, Sweden
- Died: 2 January 2000 (aged 80); Djursholm, Sweden
- Relatives: Helge Jung (father-in-law)
- Military career
- Allegiance: Sweden
- Branch: Swedish Army
- Service years: 1940–1984
- Rank: Major general
- Commands: Boden Artillery Regiment; Chief of Staff, Milo V Military Academy Karlberg; UNTSO; UNEF II; National Defence College
- Conflicts: World War II; Continuation War

Major General Bengt (T:son) Trygvesson Liljestrand (26 February 1919 – 2 January 2000) was a Swedish Army officer. He served as Chief of Staff of the United Nations Truce Supervision Organization (UNTSO) from 1974 to 1975 and Force Commander of the Second United Nations Emergency Force (UNEF II) from 1975 to 1976.

== Early life ==
Liljestrand was born on 26 February 1919 in Stockholm, Sweden, the son of hovrättsråd Trygve Liljestrand and Lolly (née Geijer) and brother of lector Greta Renborg (1921–2005). His father later became head of publishing at Norstedts förlag. His mother was the daughter of Major General Gottschalk Geijer. He passed studentexamen at Östra Real in 1937. In addition to his aptitude for language, he developed a strong interest in sports. From childhood he brought with him an interest in animals. He studied the fauna in the surroundings and was able to immerse himself in dissecting work. He had been seen by his comrades as a humanist in the making. During his school days he had been a skilled swimmer, and he developed this into a versatility that the same year resulted in a silver medal in the Swedish Championships in modern pentathlon.

== Career ==
Liljestrand was commissioned as an officer in 1940 and was assigned as a second lieutenant to Svea Artillery Regiment (A 1). From the beginning of World War II he felt a deep loyalty to the fate of Finland. He studied Finnish for Björn Collinder in Uppsala, resigned from the service and participated from 1941 as a lieutenant in the Finnish Army during the Continuation War until 1943. Liljestrand attended the Royal Swedish Army Staff College between 1947 and 1949 and he received a Bachelor of Arts degree (fil.kand.) in Uppsala in 1950. Liljestrand was captain in the General Staff Corps in 1952, attended the Swedish National Defence College in 1959 and was promoted to major and served as Chief of Staff of the IV Military District from 1959 to 1960. He then served as teacher at the Swedish National Defence College from 1960 to 1962.

Liljestrand was Senior Administrative Officer at the Coordination Department at the Ministry of Defense from 1962 to 1963 and was promoted to colonel in the General Staff Corps in 1964. Liljestrand was Section Chief at the Defence Staff from 1964 to 1966 and received a diploma from the Centre d’Etudes Industrielles in Geneva, Switzerland in 1967. He studied at the Graduate Institute of International Studies in Geneva, Switzerland from 1967 to 1968 and was commander of Boden Artillery Regiment (A 8) from 1968 to 1969. Liljestrand was Chief of Staff of Western Military District (Milo V) from 1969 to 1973 when he was promoted to major general. He was then head of the Military Academy Karlberg from 1973 to 1974. Liljestrand was appointed Chief of Staff of the United Nations Truce Supervision Organization (UNTSO) in April 1974, serving until August 1975 when he was appointed Force Commander of the Second United Nations Emergency Force (UNEF II). The force had been organized to secure the situation after the Yom Kippur War, and Sweden contributed a battalion. Under Liljestrand's leadership, it moved east to fill the void left by Israeli forces, which gradually withdrew from the occupied territories of the Sinai Peninsula. He remained in the UN service until December 1976 when he left the position on his own request.

For a time he was now at the command of the Supreme Commander of the Swedish Armed Forces General Stig Synnergren, before he was given the position of head of the Swedish National Defence College in 1978, a position he retained until he retired in 1984. Liljestrand moved to Morges, Switzerland after his retirement to study security policy at the Graduate Institute of International and Development Studies in Geneva from 1985 to 1991.

== Personal life ==
In 1943 he married Elisabeth Jung (1919–1994), the daughter of General Helge Jung and Ruth (née Wehtje). Liljestrand was the father of Ulla (born 1944), Trygve (born 1946), Agneta (born 1950), and Karin (born 1953).

== Death ==
He died on 2 January 2000 and was buried at Djursholm cemetery.

== Dates of rank ==
=== Sweden ===
- 1940 – Second lieutenant
- 19?? – Lieutenant
- 1952 – Captain
- 1959 – Major
- 19?? – Lieutenant colonel
- 1964 – Colonel
- 1973 – Major general
- 1975 – Lieutenant general (Note: Bengt Liljestrand had an acting rank of lieutenant general as Force Commander of UNEF II from 1975 to 1976 but was major general in the Swedish Army.)

=== Finland ===
- 1941 – Lieutenant

== Awards and decorations ==
- (Sweden) Commander 1st Class of the Order of the Sword (6 June 1972)
- (Sweden) Knight of the Order of the Sword (1959)
- (Finland) Order of the Cross of Liberty, 4th Class with Swords

== Honours ==
- Member of the Royal Swedish Academy of War Sciences (1963)
- Vice chairman of the Karolinska förbundet

== Footnotes ==
Military offices
Preceded by Karl-Gösta Lundmark	Boden Artillery Regiment; 1968–1969	Succeeded by Bertil Malgerud
Preceded by Nils Sköld	Chief of Staff of the Western Military District; 1969–1973	Succeeded by Bengt Rasin
Preceded by Gösta Gärdin	Head, Military Academy Karlberg; 1963–1974	Succeeded by Gunnar Hallström
Preceded by Richard Bunworth	Chief of Staff, United Nations Truce Supervision Organization; 1974–1975	Succeeded by Keith Howard
Preceded by Ensio Siilasvuo	Force Commander, Second United Nations Emergency Force; 1975–1976	Succeeded by Rais Abin
Preceded by Bo Westin	Swedish National Defence College; 1978–1984	Succeeded by Gustaf Welin
