= I Gede Ngurah Swajaya =

Indonesian diplomat (born 1962)

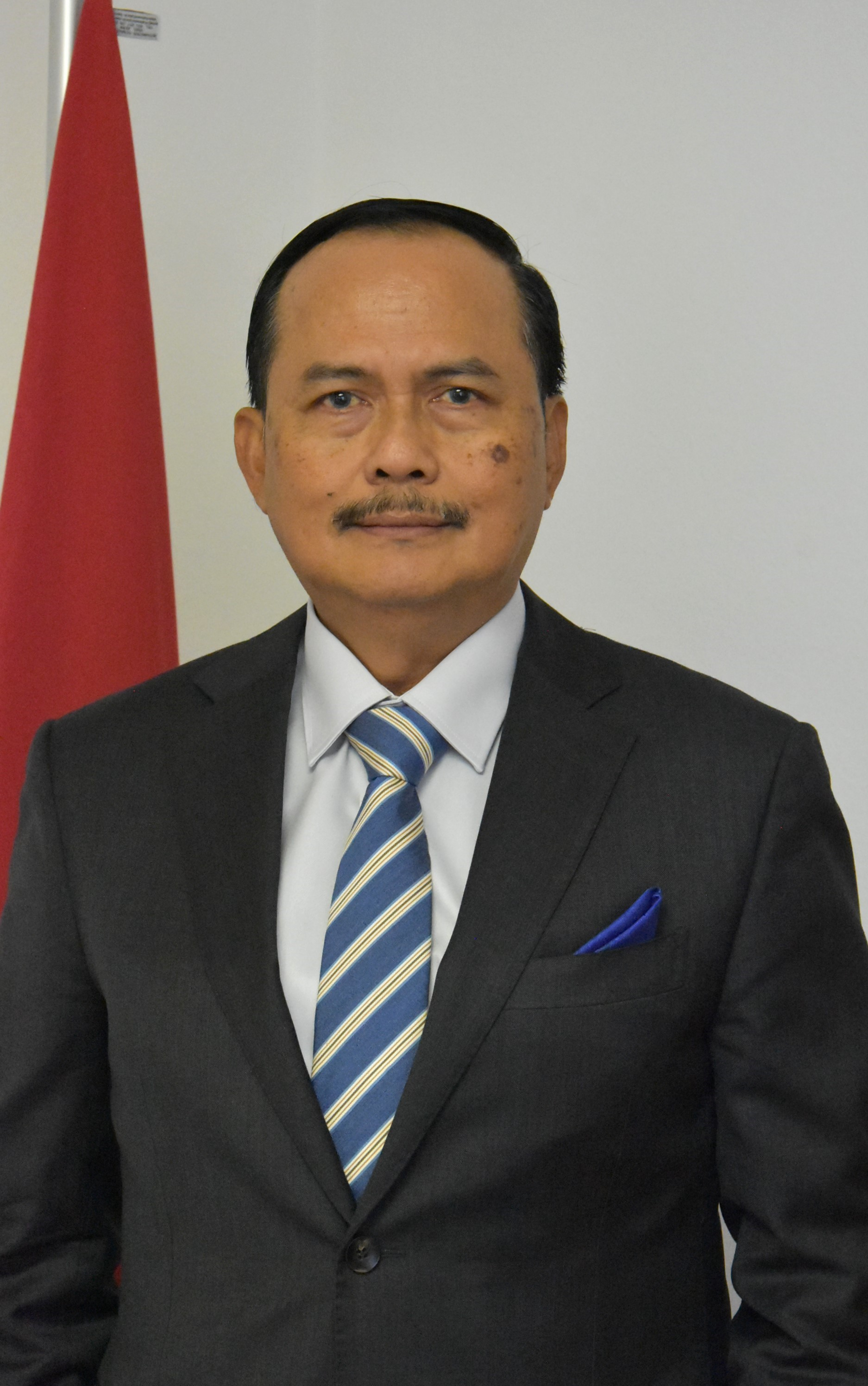

Ambassador of Indonesia to Switzerland and Liechtenstein
- Incumbent
- Assumed office 26 June 2023
- Preceded by: Muliaman Hadad

Director General of America and Europe
- In office March 2020 – 15 September 2022
- Preceded by: Muhammad Anshor
- Succeeded by: Umar Hadi

20th Ambassador of Indonesia to Singapore
- In office 23 December 2015 – 14 September 2020
- President: Joko Widodo
- Preceded by: Andri Hadi
- Succeeded by: Suryopratomo

1st Permanent Representative of Indonesia to ASEAN
- In office 2010–2013
- President: Susilo Bambang Yudhoyono
- Preceded by: new position
- Succeeded by: Rahmat Pramono

10th Ambassador of Indonesia to Cambodia
- In office 2009–2010
- President: Susilo Bambang Yudhoyono
- Preceded by: Nurrochman Oerip
- Succeeded by: Soehardjono Sastromihardjo

Personal details
- Born: March 11, 1962 (age 64) Singaraja, Bali, Indonesia
- Spouse: Ni Nyoman Mahaswi Astama
- Children: Putu Prima Apri Swajaya; Made Bella Octavina Swajaya
- Education: Udayana University; Tufts University
- Profession: Bureaucrat, diplomat

I Gede Ngurah Swajaya, also known as Ngurah Swajaya, (born 11 March 1962) is an Indonesian diplomat who served as Indonesia’s ambassador to Singapore from 2015 to 2020. Previously, he served as the first ambassador to ASEAN and Cambodia.

== Early life ==
Ngurah was born in Singaraja, Bali, Indonesia. He is the eldest son of I Gede Kawijaya, S.H and Made Sutini, who also served as a civil servant with the last position as the chief of the National Land Agency for the Provincial Government of Bali. He was raised as a child in Surabaya and Bali with three of his younger brothers.

== Education ==
Ngurah attended Udayana University in Bali from 1981 to 1986 majoring in law, and later got his master's degree as Master of Arts (MA), from the Fletcher School of Law and Diplomacy, Tufts University, Boston, MA, USA.

== Career ==
Ngurah joined the Ministry of Foreign Affairs in 1986. Upon completing basic diplomatic education from 1987 to 1988, he was assigned to the embassy in Bonn with the rank of third secretary, and later second secretary, from 1992 to 1995. Returning to Jakarta, Ngurah was appointed as the chief of international commodity and agricultural affairs section within the foreign department from 1995 to 1998.

Ngurah undertook overseas posting at the permanent mission to the United Nations, in New York City, USA from 1999–2003 with the rank of counsellor. During his service in the permanent mission, he served as the Assistant Chairman at Preparatory Committee of WSSD and Main Committee of WSSD from 2001 to 2002. From 2003 to 2004, he was named as the deputy director for multilateral economic development and environment affairs before assuming duties as acting director for the same portfolio from 2004 to 2005. From 2003 to 2004, he was the Vice Chairman at United Nations Forum on Forests. He then served as the director for ASEAN Political Security Cooperation, serving in an acting capacity and later permanently, until 2009.

He was sworn in by President Susilo Bambang Yudhoyono as the Ambassador Extraordinary and Plenipotentiary of Indonesia to the Kingdom of Cambodia on January 30, 2009, from 2009–2010. He presented the letter of credence from the President of the Republic of Indonesia to His Majesty, the King of Cambodia Norodom Sihamoni on April 22, 2009. Ngurah was later assigned to become the first Permanent Representative/Ambassador Extraordinary and Plenipotentiary of the Republic of Indonesia to ASEAN. He presented the letter of credence from the President of the Republic of Indonesia to the Secretary General of ASEAN on behalf of ASEAN on March 23, 2010.

In February 2016, he was appointed as Indonesian Ambassador to Singapore.

Ngurah has been involved in several international, United Nations and ASEAN negotiations. He served as the Chair or the facilitator in many of those negotiations. He wrote articles for local newspapers and lecture at several universities in Indonesia.

== ASEAN 2011 ==
The Republic of Indonesia served as the rotating chair of ASEAN 2011. In this context, Ngurah was appointed to serve as the Chairperson of the Committee of the Permanent Representative to ASEAN. He also served as the Chairperson of the ASEAN Connectivity Coordinating Committee, that was tasked to coordinate the implementation of the Master Plan of ASEAN Connectivity. As the Permanent Representative of the Republic of Indonesia to ASEAN, he served as the member of the Board of Trustees of the ASEAN Foundation.

== Personal life ==
In January 1987, Ngurah married Ni Nyoman Mahaswi Astama and now have two children.
