= Embassy of Indonesia, Singapore =

Embassy of the Republic of Indonesia in Singapore Kedutaan Besar Republik Indonesia di Singapura

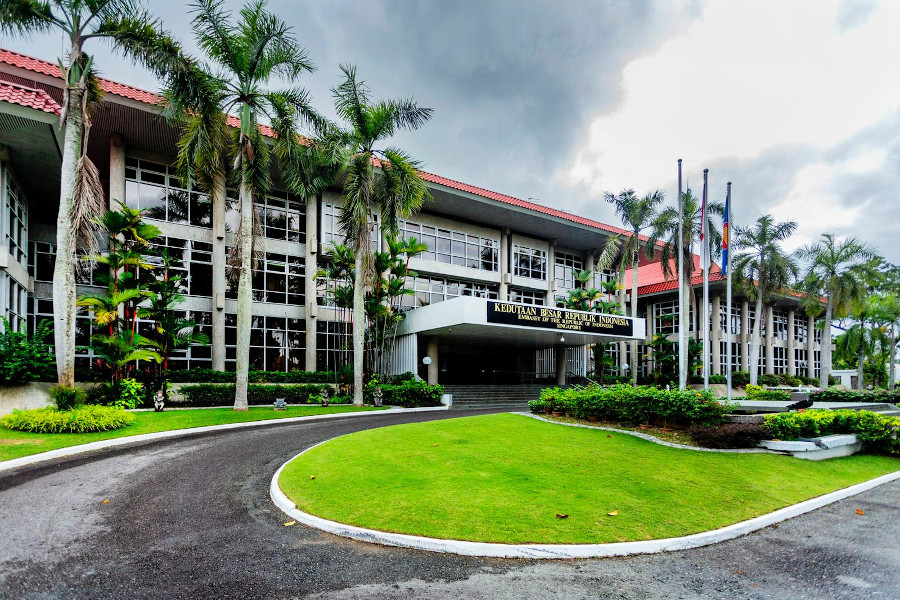
- Location: Singapore
- Address: 7 Chatsworth Road; Singapore 249761
- Coordinates: 1°17′57.48″N 103°49′21.9″E
- Ambassador: Suryopratomo
- Jurisdiction: Singapore
- Website: kemlu.go.id/singapore/en/

The Embassy of the Republic of Indonesia in Singapore (Indonesian: Kedutaan Besar Republik Indonesia di Singapura) is the diplomatic mission of the Republic of Indonesia to Singapore. The embassy is located at 7 Chatsworth Road and is currently headed by Ambassador Suryopratomo who was sworn in on 14 September 2020.

== History ==
Indonesia established diplomatic relations with Singapore in 1950 when Singapore was still a British crown colony. Its first consulate general was Mohamad Razif which took office from 1950 to 1954. Diplomatic relations with independent Republic of Singapore was established in September 1967, one month after both countries became founding members of ASEAN and Abdul Rahman Ramly became the country's first ambassador to Singapore.

== Location ==
The embassy is located at Chatsworth Road in Tanglin, an area close to Orchard Road and known for its residence of embassies. The compound sits on a 10.506 square meters piece of land which houses the four-storeyed office building, the official residences of the Ambassador and the Deputy Ambassador, as well as a housing complex for the diplomatic staff of the Embassy. In addition, the grounds also include sports facilities (a tennis court and a swimming pool) and a mosque.

Besides visa and consular services, the embassy serves as a meeting point for Indonesians living throughout the island, where the embassy regularly organizes open house sessions during Idul Fitri.

Every year on 17 August, the embassy holds a celebration for Independence Day, starting with a flag-raising ceremony performed by Paskibra troop from Sekolah Indonesia Singapura.

== See also ==
- Indonesia–Singapore relations
- List of diplomatic missions in Indonesia
- List of diplomatic missions in Singapore
