= Sukotjo Tjokroatmodjo =

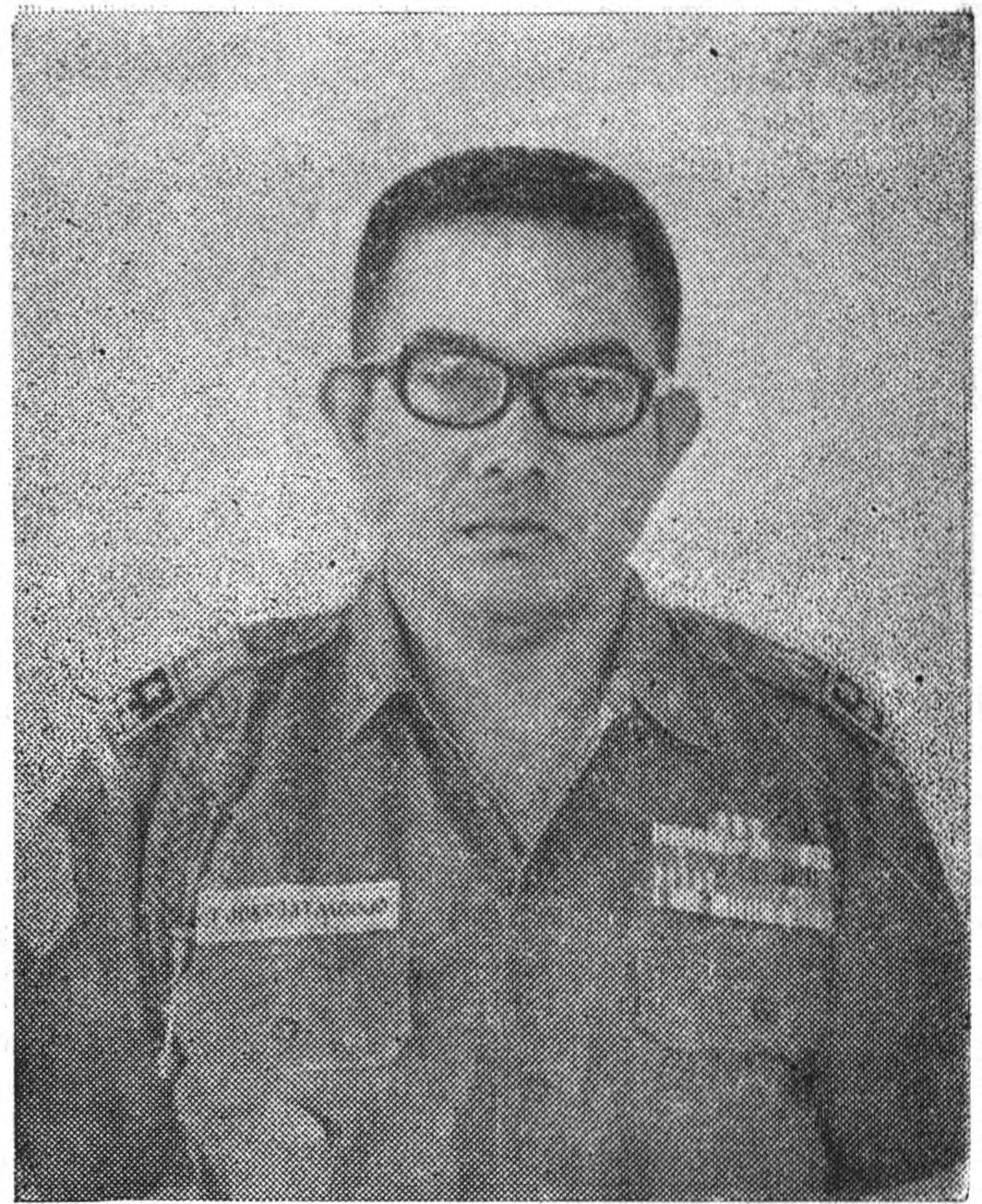
- Born: 18 December 1927; Kertosono, Java, Indonesia
- Died: 16 March 2017 (aged 89)
- Military career
- Allegiance: Indonesia
- Branch: Indonesian Army
- Rank: Major general
- Nickname: Pak Kotjo
- Service number: NPV.21.115.793
- Conflicts: Indonesian War of Independence
- Other work: Civil servant, historian

Sukotjo Tjokroatmodjo (also spelled Soekotjo) (18 December 1927 – 16 March 2017) was an Indonesian historian, civil servant and retired Major general. He saw combat in the Indonesian War of Independence of 1945–1949. He later became assistant for international co-operation to the Minister of Defence, serving between 1978 and 1984. After retirement he was one of the vice-chairmen of Indonesia's veteran association, Legiun Veteran Republik Indonesia.

== Indonesian War of Independence and military career ==
Sukotjo was born on 18 December 1927 in Kertosono, Java. After the surrender of Japanese forces in Indonesia in 1945, Sukotjo obtained one of the rifles the Japanese left behind. "At the moment I just started fighting" he has said about the start of his involvement in the war. On 9 August 1947 he finished his training as an officer at the rank of vaandrig (officer cadet). At that point he joined the bodyguard of Sukarno and was with him during his surrender at Yogyakarta. In 1952 Sukotjo had reached the rank of Lieutenant. He retired from the military at the rank of Major general.

== Civil service ==
He later became assistant for international co-operation to the Minister of Defence, serving between 1978 and 1984. He then went on to become an inspector-general in the Department of Education, working there between 1984 and 1987.

== Later life ==
In 1999 Sukotjo opposed the deployment of Australian troops during the United Nations Transitional Administration in East Timor after the Indonesian occupation of East Timor. He saw it as a decline in the Australian-Indonesian relations. In 2010 Sukotjo was one of the historians doubting the influence of former Indonesian president Suharto during the 1 March 1949 offensive on Yogyakarta. History books had claimed that Lieutenant Colonel Suharto was the instigator of the General Offensive of 1 March 1949, but Sukotjo disagreed. Sukotjo claimed that Colonel Bambang Sugeng, the commander of the Army Division III was the main plotter. He, alongside other historians asked for the Ministries of Defence and Education to rewrite the history books. In a September 2013 interview with a Nederlandse Omroep Stichting reporter Sukotjo asked the Dutch government to acknowledge the 17 August 1945 proclamation of Indonesian Independence, as the Dutch government still only acknowledges the 17 August proclamation de facto.

He currently is one of the vice-chairman of Indonesia's veteran association, Legiun Veteran Republik Indonesia.

== Personal life ==
He married in 1953 and has three children. Sukotjo speaks Dutch fluently.
