= Suryopratomo =

21st ambassador of Indonesia to Singapore

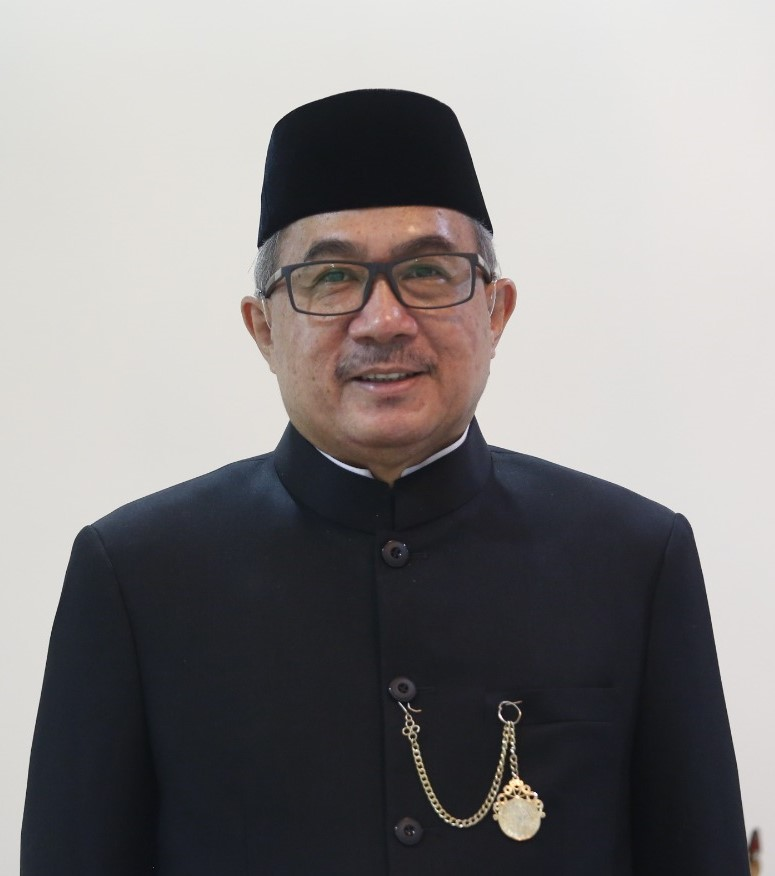

21st Ambassador of Indonesia to Singapore
- In office 14 September 2020 – 31 December 2025
- President: Joko Widodo; Prabowo Subianto
- Preceded by: I Gede Ngurah Swajaya
- Succeeded by: Hotmangaradja Pandjaitan

Personal details
- Born: 12 May 1961 (age 65) Bandung, West Java, Indonesia
- Education: Bogor Agricultural University
- Occupation: Diplomat, journalist

Suryopratomo, or popularly known as Tommy (born 12 May 1961) is an Indonesian diplomat and journalist. He became Indonesia's ambassador to Singapore since 2020, replacing his predecessor I Gede Ngurah Swajaya.

His name rose to fame through his work on various newspaper and television stations in Indonesia, among them are Kompas, Media Indonesia and Metro TV. Before assuming as editor-in-chief for Metro TV, Tommy worked as a journalist for Kompas and has been sent for news coverage to various regions throughout the country. He was then appointed as the chairman for Editor-in-Chiefs Forum (Forum Pemred) from 2015 until 2017.

== Background ==
Suryopratomo was born in Bandung on 12 May 1961. After finishing senior high, Tommy continued his studies at Faculty of Animal Science in Bogor Agricultural University and graduated in 1983. He finished his postgraduate studies at the same university in 1986 At that time, he had two options: to become a lecturer and continue his studies even further or apply to work on a job. Tommy chose to work, a choice frowned upon by his father, Tjokroprawiro which wanted Tommy to continue his doctoral studies. Tommy then send four applications, and only Kompas called for his favor. It was not in expectation that Tommy eventually became Kompas's editor-in-chief, one of Indonesia's leading newspapers, at a very young age of 39.

Four years after joining Kompas, he worked as deputy desk chief for sports. A year later, Tommy was transferred to the economy desk. After being promoted as managing editor, on 1 February 2000 Tommy received the baton from Jakob Oetama as editor-in-chief, after 35 years held by its founder.

According to Presidential Decree No. 91/P 2020 dated 11 September 2020 and Presidential Decree No. 92/P and 93/P 2020 dated 14 September 2020, Suryopratomo was sworn in as Indonesia's ambassador for the Republic of Singapore by President Joko Widodo.

== See also ==
- Metro TV
- Kompas

Diplomatic posts
Preceded by I Gede Ngurah Swajaya	Ambassador of Indonesia to Singapore; 2020–2025	Succeeded by Hotmangaradja Pandjaitan
