= Ensio Siilasvuo =

Finnish general

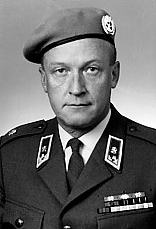
- Ensio Siilasvuo in the 1970s
- Born: Pehr Hjalmar Ensio Strömberg; 1 January 1922; Helsinki, Finland
- Died: 10 January 2003 (aged 81); Espoo, Finland
- Relatives: Lieutenant General Hjalmar Siilasvuo (father)
- Military career
- Allegiance: Finland
- Branch: Finnish Army
- Service years: 1940–1980
- Rank: General
- Commands: Chief Coordinator, United Nations Peacekeeping Forces in the Middle East (1975–79); United Nations Emergency Force II (1973–75); United Nations Truce Supervision Organization (1970–73); Finnish Contingent, UNFICYP (1964–65); Finnish Contingent, UNEF I (1957)
- Conflicts: World War II; Continuation War
- Awards: Grand Cross of the Order of the Lion of Finland; Knight First Class of the Order of the White Rose of Finland; Cross of Liberty, 3rd Class

Pehr Hjalmar Ensio Siilasvuo (né Strömberg; 1 January 1922 – 10 January 2003) was a Finnish general. His father was Lieutenant General Hjalmar Siilasvuo of Winter War fame.

Ensio Siilasvuo enlisted in the Finnish Army in 1940 and served as a chief-of-staff of an infantry regiment in 1945. He was promoted to captain at the age of 22 and was wounded twice.

After the war he led several UN missions. He was the Commander of the Finnish Contingent to Cyprus in 1964 to 1965, UNFICYP. He served in a variety of positions in the Middle East after the Six-Day War. He was Commander of the United Nations Emergency Force II on the Sinai Peninsula from the end of the October War (1973) until August 1975. In August 1975 he was assigned to the new post of Chief Coordinator of the United Nations Peacekeeping Missions in the Middle East, which he held until peace was reached between Egypt and Israel in 1979. He retired in 1980.

He was promoted to the rank of full general on 6 October 1998.

== Works ==
- In the Service of Peace in the Middle East 1967-1979 (1992)
