= Islamabad Chamber of Commerce & Industry =

- Abbreviation: ICCI
- Headquarters: Islamabad, Pakistan
- Region served: Islamabad
- President: Sardar Tahir Mehmood
- Website: www.icci.com.pk

The Islamabad Chamber of Commerce & Industry (ICCI) was established in 1984 and incorporated under the Companies Act VII of 1913 on 26 August 1984 as a Limited Company by Guarantee. Its registered office is in Islamabad and its jurisdiction spreads over the entire Federal Capital Area, both urban and rural. As per the new the Trade Ordinance and Rule 2007, the ICCI got a new license in April 2007

== ICCI Office Bearers (2025–2026) ==
Name	Position
Sardar Tahir Mehmood	President
Senior President	Senior Vice President
Muhammad Irfan Chaudhry	Vice President

== Past presidents of ICCI ==
The ICCI has held presidents since 1984 to 2024.

Name	Held office
Anayat Ullah Mirza	1984–1986
Muqeem Ahmed Khan	1987
Muhammad Raza Khan	1988
Muhammad Siddique Butt	1989
Khalid Masood Bhola	1990
Mian Shaukat Masud	1991
Shahid Rashid Butt	1992
Muhammad Aslam	1993
Shahid Rashid Butt	1994
Khalid Javaid	1995
Munawar Mughal	1996–1997
Mian Akram Farid	1997–1998
Sheikh Baser Daud	1998–1999
Waqar Aslam Hamdi	1999–2000
Mohsin Khalid	2000–2001
Munawar Mughal	2001–2002
Mian Akram Farid	2002–2003
Zubair Ahmed Malik	2003–2004
Tariq Sadiq	2004–2005
Abdul Rauf	2005–2006
Muhammad Nasir Khan	2006–2007
Muhammad Ijaz Abbasi	2007–2008
Mian Shaukat Masud	2008–2009
Zahid Maqbool	2009–2010
Mahfooz Elahi	2010–2011
Yassar Sakhi Butt	2011–2012
Zafar Bakhtawari	2012–2013
Shaban Khalid Ch	2013–2014
Muzzamil Hussain Sabri	2014–15
Atif Ikram Sheikh	2015–16
Khalid Iqbal Malik	2016–17
Sheikh Amir Waheed	2017–18
Ahmed Mughal	2018–19
Ahmed Waheed	2019–20
Yasir Ilyas	2020–21
Shakeel Munir	2021–22
Ahsan Zafar Bakhtawari	2022–24

== Business development ==
he ICCI are attempting to improve membership services through access to various information resources. Under this grant, the ICCI undertook to conduct a training needs assessment survey of its members in order to determine the services it can offer to its members. The survey results were used to establish business support services to fulfill the needs identified. The ICCI also undertook a series of workshops on youth and women entrepreneurship. During the tenure of Sardar Tahir Mehmood as president, additional communication and outreach functions were strengthened, including the appointment of Amir Imtiaz as marketing head to support media coordination and digital outreach.

== See also ==
- Islamabad
- Economy of Pakistan
- Karachi Chamber of Commerce & Industry
- Lahore chamber
- Pakistan
