= Riau Islands Flight Information Region =

The Riau Islands Flight Information Region is a proposed Flight Information Region (FIR) situated above the Riau Islands, which is a province of Indonesia comprising the principal group of the Riau Archipelago along with other island groups to the south, east and northeast. It is currently part of the Singapore FIR under the administration of the Singapore civil aviation authorities as a result of an arrangement by the International Civil Aviation Organization (ICAO) in 1946.

== Background ==
An FIR is the area of airspace that a country's civil air traffic control centre controls as assigned by the ICAO. Its main purpose is to give flight information services to civil aircraft flying through the area to ensure flight safety. There is no standard size for FIRs. Rather, FIRs are designed to ensure administrative convenience and flight safety. The latter point is a critical function of FIRs for users of the airspace, especially commercial aircraft and aircraft in distress, as information and alerting services are provided by the authorities administering the FIR. FIRs are also the designated areas for search and rescue activities (i.e. Search and Rescue Regions), which allows efficient and effective command and coordination during such humanitarian missions.

== Claims over Riau Islands FIR ==
Singapore aviation authorities have been administering control of the country's FIR, which includes Singapore territories, as well as certain parts of the airspace in the Riau Archipelago and South China Sea. Specific to the Riau Islands (also called Natuna Islands), the ICAO granted control of the FIR to Singapore authorities in 1946 on the basis of "operational and technical" merits. This has persisted for decades, largely owing to Singapore's world class aviation infrastructure, as well as its well-honed reputation for efficiency and effectiveness. Negotiations are ongoing for the control over the FIR.

=== Indonesia's enthusiasm to control FIR to grow the aviation industry ===
Indonesia has at times publicly questioned the existing policy by ICAO to have Singapore continue administering the Riau Islands FIR. Since the mid-2010s, Indonesia has publicly requested control of the FIR over its territorial airspace, including over the Riau Islands. Indonesian President Joko Widodo (Jokowi) and some former military officials have reportedly called for or expressed their wish for Indonesia to take over the FIR over Riau Islands. Jokowi also set a target for Indonesia to satisfy all conditions from ICAO and take over control of the FIR by 2019, although it appears to be a domestic target instead of one that has received the blessings of international aviation authorities. This bid to take over the Riau Islands FIR has been linked to the desire to establish Indonesia as a major regional aviation player to match existing powerhouses such as Singapore, China, Thailand and Malaysia. In addition, the issue of taking over the Riau Islands FIR has also been conflated with the perceived matter of territorial claims and air sovereignty, although this has been an issue primarily espoused within Indonesian military circles or among former defense establishment personnel.

=== Indonesia's inadequate capabilities to manage the FIR ===
However, not all Indonesian government officials have shared the desire for Indonesia to take over the FIR. For example, Indonesian Transportation Minister Ignasius Jonan indicated in 2015 that Indonesia was not able to manage the FIR due to limited resources. Further, some Indonesian aviation industry experts have pointed to Indonesia's lack of presence on ICAO and poor aviation safety record as factors for its inability to convince the ICAO authorities that it could manage the FIR safely, efficiently and effectively. In particular, doubts were raised on the safety record of the Indonesia aviation industry, which was ranked the poorest globally in terms of safety. The Indonesian case was not helped by a lackluster safety record that saw an average of 40 air crashes a year since 2001 and which had almost 60 Indonesian airlines banned from operating in the EU. However, European Commission lifted the ban on 14 June 2018 and cleared all carriers from Indonesia from the EU Air Safety List.

Air Chief Marshal Chappy Hakim, Chief of Staff of the Indonesia Air Force from 2002 to 2005 has pointed out notable flaws in the management of numerous airports around the country which have faced an inability to handle increasingly busy air traffic lanes and criticized the Indonesian government for poor national planning which has favoured civil commercial flights over the country's own national air defense and also covered up the occurrence of aviation accidents.

=== Singapore's responses ===
In response to requests from Indonesia, Singapore has over the years cited statements that the current arrangement was made by ICAO with aviation safety as its key consideration, and that it was not unusual globally and historically for the air traffic authorities of one country to provide air traffic management services in the territorial airspace of another country. To back up the claim, it has pointed to Indonesia's management of the airspace of other countries as an example. That being said, there have also been some signs that the Singapore government believes the matter might have been politicized and used as an issue to rally popular support from Indonesians, although Singapore's suspicion does not appear to have been seriously raised to Indonesia for formal consideration. Singapore's responses have not been formally debated in public or discussed at the diplomatic level, and it remains to be seen if Indonesia has conceded that Singapore's position is accurate and the safest arrangement for air travelers.

== Controversies from unsubstantiated claims ==
=== Collection of fees ===
There have also been unsubstantiated claims made by the Indonesian military community. For example, former Indonesian Airforce Chief of Staff Koesnadi Kardi claimed in November 2017 that Indonesia only received a small amount of money collected from Route Air Navigation Services (RANS), which were the charges levied to recover the cost for facilities and services rendered to users of the airspace. In response to the accusation which implied that Singapore had retained control of the FIR to benefit financially at the expense of Indonesians, Singapore authorities stated that "(a)ll RANS charges that Singapore collects on behalf of Indonesia are remitted to the Directorate-General of Civil Aviation (DGCA) Indonesia, less the bank transfer costs. And DGCA Indonesia has always found the accounts to be in order." In addition, Indonesian Airforce Commander Colonel Azhar Aditomo also claimed that the reason for expensive flights to and from the Riau Islands was because Singapore controlled the FIR. However, the claim was also invalidated by the matter-of-fact reply that Singapore took no proceeds from the RANS and did not benefit financially from administering the FIR.

=== Ill intent towards Singapore and its aviation industry ===
Another former Indonesian military Chief of Staff also claimed that "Singapore would be destroyed if Indonesia took over the (Riau Islands) FIR", on the basis that Singapore's status as an aviation hub would be undone without control of the FIR. The comment was in line with historical animosities displayed by some Indonesian leaders towards Singapore. In response, Singapore continued to avoid commenting on such speculative comments, reiterating that the matter was one that concerned aviation safety and efficiency.

== Realignment of Jakarta-Singapore FIR ==
=== New FIR boundary ===
On 25 January 2022, Indonesia and Singapore signed an agreement where both countries will seek the approval of the International Civil Aviation Organization (ICAO) in Montreal, Canada to realign the Jakarta FIR with Indonesian territorial waters. This realignment ensures that the airspace over the islands of Karimun, Batam, Bintan and Natuna, controlled by Singapore since 1946, follows the archipelaegic boundaries of Indonesia.

The realigned FIR boundaries will be presented to the respective parliaments for ratification and submitted to the ICAO for approval before coming into effect.

To facilitate air traffic movements of Singapore's Changi Airport, Indonesia and Singapore agreed that air traffic control over the newly aligned Jakarta FIR region in that particular section will continue to be delegated by Singapore for the next 25 years, expiring in 2047, subject to further extension by mutual agreement and with the consent of the ICAO.
