= Billions and Billions =

1997 book by Carl Sagan

Billions and Billions: Thoughts on Life and Death at the Brink of the Millennium
- Cover of the first edition
- Author: Carl Sagan
- Language: English
- Subject: Science
- Publisher: Random House
- Publication date: 1997
- Publication place: United States
- Media type: Print (hardcover and paperback)
- Pages: 322 pp.
- ISBN: 0-679-41160-7
- OCLC: 39234941
- Preceded by: The Demon-Haunted World
- Followed by: The Varieties of Scientific Experience

Billions and Billions: Thoughts on Life and Death at the Brink of the Millennium is a 1997 book by the American astronomer and science popularizer Carl Sagan. The last book written by Sagan before his death in 1996, it was published by Random House.

== Overview ==
The book is a collection of essays Sagan wrote covering diverse topics such as global warming, the population explosion, extraterrestrial life, morality, and the abortion debate. The last chapter is an account of his struggle with myelodysplasia, the disease which finally took his life in December 1996. Sagan's wife, Ann Druyan, wrote the epilogue of the book after his death.

== "Billions and billions" ==
To help viewers of Cosmos distinguish between "millions" and "billions", Sagan stressed the "b". The public's association of Sagan with the phrase "billions and billions" came from a Tonight Show skit. Parodying Sagan's affect, Johnny Carson quipped "billions and billions". The phrase has, however, now become a humorous fictitious unit—the sagan. Aside from using the catchphrase as the title of the book, Sagan's introduction also discusses it.
