= Jon Lomberg =

American artist and journalist (born 1948)

Jon Lomberg (born 1948) is an American space artist and science journalist. He was Carl Sagan's principal artistic collaborator for more than twenty years on many projects from 1972 through 1996. In 1998, the International Astronomical Union officially named an asteroid (6446 Lomberg) in recognition of his achievements in science communication. He was NASA's Design Director for the Golden Record on the Voyager spacecraft; the cover he designed is expected to last at least a billion years.

== Biography ==
Jon Lomberg grew up in Philadelphia, Pennsylvania. During a visit to Toronto, Ontario, after college, he was invited by science fiction author Judith Merril to display his artwork at a conference she organised for the Ontario Institute for Studies in Education. Lomberg moved to Toronto later that year and, after assisting Merril in a radio documentary for the CBC Radio One program Ideas, went on to create many documentaries on topics such as NASA's Viking program and Halley's Comet for the program.

In 1972, Lomberg showed some of his paintings to astronomer Carl Sagan, who then asked him to illustrate his book The Cosmic Connection (1973). This was the beginning of their quarter century of collaboration on many projects, including the Cosmos series (for which Lomberg created the talent pool and as chief artist won a Primetime Emmy Award), the Cosmos book, Broca's Brain, NASA's interstellar Voyager Golden Record, the original cover art for Sagan's 1985 novel Contact, and the opening sequence from Earth through the Solar System and its galaxy and beyond for the 1997 Contact film. At Sagan's request, Lomberg designed the original sailing ship logo for the Planetary Society in 1981.

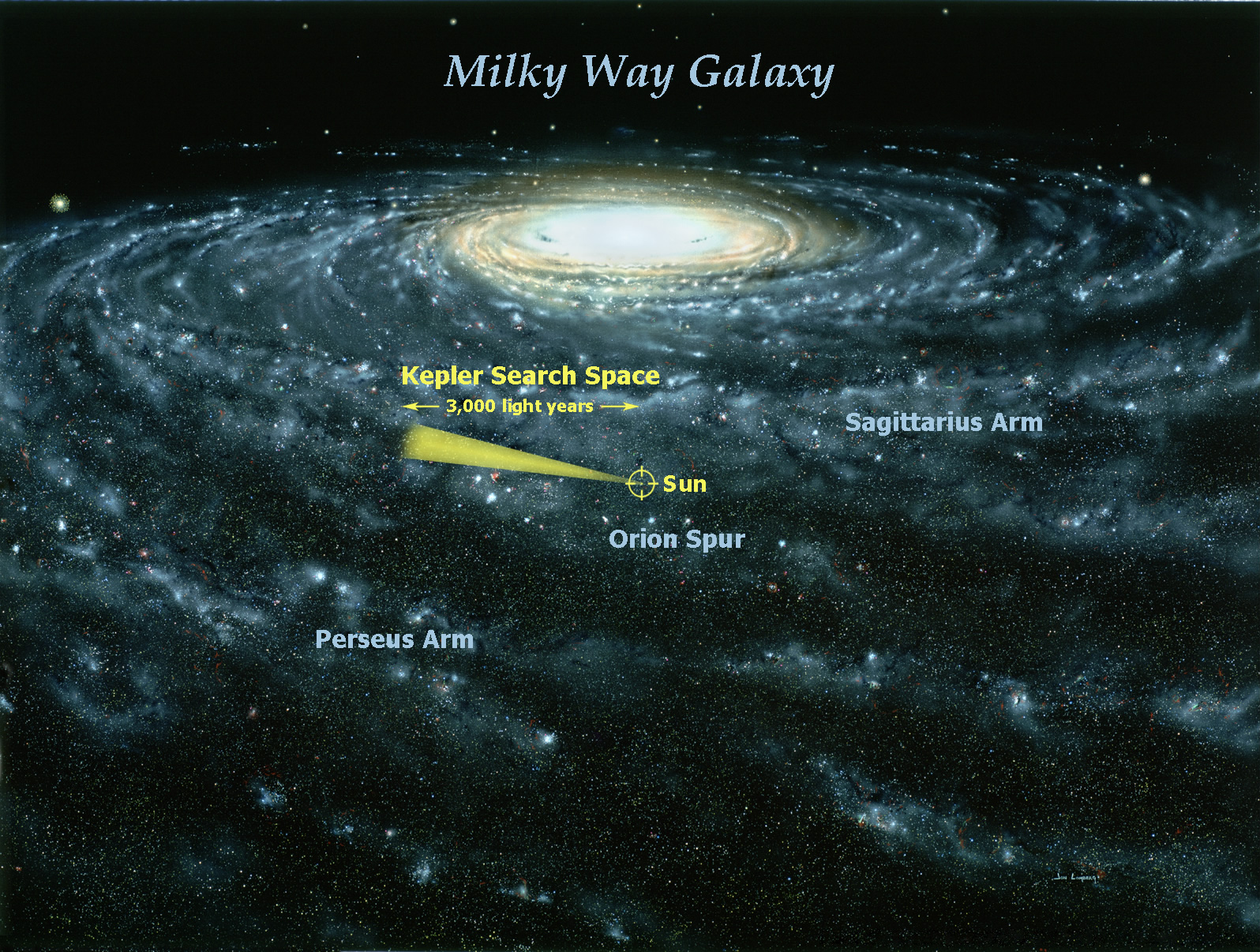
Lomberg's Milky Way portrait as background for Kepler Mission diagram.

The Smithsonian Institution commissioned Lomberg in the early 1990s to paint "A Portrait of the Milky Way", a scientifically accurate artistic representation of the Milky Way galaxy as seen by a hypothetical observer from a vantage point 10 degrees above the galactic plane and 60,000 light years from the galactic center. The 6 ft (1.8 m) by 8 ft (2.4 m) painting, which was described in a peer reviewed academic paper in 1994 as "the best representation of our galaxy to date" and "a first map like those of explorers long ago", was displayed in the National Air and Space Museum from 1992 through 2002 and remains part of its permanent collection of aviation and space art. Lomberg also designed the Galaxy Garden, a three-dimensional walk-through Milky Way scale model which is part of the Paleaku Peace Gardens Sanctuary in Kailua-Kona, Hawaii.

Lomberg co-designed the MarsDial aboard the Mars Exploration Rovers Spirit and Opportunity, and was the project director and editor-in-chief for the Visions of Mars CD-ROM and mini-DVD aboard the spacecraft Phoenix, which landed on Mars in May 2008. He was also on the Waste Isolation Pilot Plant planning teams with Frank Drake, Ben Finney, Ward Goodenough, Louis Narens, Frederick Newmeyer, Woodruff Sullivan and others.

Jon Lomberg is a founding member of the International Association of Astronomical Artists, a member of the Planetary Society advisory council, and designs exhibits and gives presentations for the Mauna Kea Astronomy Education Center in Hilo, Hawaii for the Mauna Kea Observatory and Gemini North. He lives in Hawaii with his wife and two children.

== Bibliography ==
The books Jon Lomberg has co-authored and/or illustrated include:

- 1978: Carl Sagan, Frank Drake, Ann Druyan, Timothy Ferris, Jon Lomberg, Linda Salzman Sagan. Murmurs of Earth: The Voyager Interstellar Record. New York City: Random House. ISBN 0-394-41047-5.
- 1979: Carl Sagan, Broca's Brain: Reflections on the Romance of Science. New York City: Random House. ISBN 0-394-50169-1.
- 1997: Donald Goldsmith, Worlds Unnumbered: The Search For Extrasolar Planets. Herndon, Virginia: University Science Books. ISBN 0-935702-97-0.
- 1997: Donald Goldsmith, Einstein's Greatest Blunder? The Cosmological Constant and Other Fudge Factors in the Physics of the Universe. Cambridge, Massachusetts: Harvard University Press. ISBN 0-674-24242-4.
- 2001: Donald Goldsmith and Tobias Owen, The Search for Life in the Universe. Herndon, Virginia: University Science Books. ISBN 978-1-891389-16-0.
- 2004: David W. Thomson and James Bourassa, Secrets of the Aether: Unified Force Theory, Dark Matter and Consciousness. Alma, Illinois: The Aenor Trust. ISBN 0-9724251-2-8.

== Awards and honors ==
The awards and honors which have been bestowed upon Jon Lomberg include:

- 1979: American Institute of Graphic Arts Certificate of Excellence for the cover of Broca's Brain: Reflections on the Romance of Science.
- 1981: Primetime Emmy Award from the Academy of Television Arts and Sciences for Outstanding Individual Achievement in Creative Technical Crafts for the TV series Cosmos.
- 1983: Graphic Design USA magazine DESI Award for nuclear winter artwork in PARADE magazine.
- 1984: Vermont World Peace Film Festival Prize for Best Video Documentary for the videotape of the multi-media show Nuclear Winter with Carl Sagan.
- 1987: Columbia University Graduate School of Journalism Armstrong Award for Documentary for the Ideas program Halley's Comet.
- 1996: American Association for the Advancement of Science Best Children's Science Book Award for the "Life In The Universe" curriculum for grades 4-9, in the Life Science category.
- 1998: International Astronomical Union officially renamed Asteroid Lomberg, formerly asteroid 6446 1990QL.
- 2002: Astronomical Society of the Pacific Klumpke-Roberts Award.
