= Carl Sagan =

American scientist and science communicator (1934–1996)

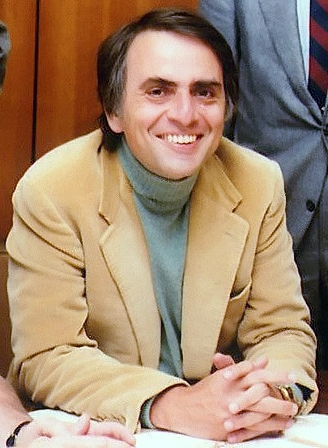
- Sagan in 1980
- Born: Carl Edward Sagan; November 9, 1934; New York City, U.S.
- Died: December 20, 1996 (aged 62); Seattle, Washington, U.S.
- Resting place: Lake View Cemetery
- Education: University of Chicago (BA, BS, MS, PhD)
- Known for: Search for Extra-Terrestrial Intelligence (SETI); Cosmos: A Personal Voyage; Cosmos; Voyager Golden Record; Pioneer plaque; The Dragons of Eden; Contact; Pale Blue Dot; The Demon-Haunted World
- Spouses: Lynn Margulis (m. 1957; div. 1965) Linda Salzman (m. 1968; div. 1981) Ann Druyan (m. 1981)
- Children: 5, including Dorion, Nick, and Sasha
- Awards: Klumpke-Roberts Award (1974); NASA Distinguished Public Service Medal (1977); Pulitzer Prize for General Nonfiction (1978); Oersted Medal (1990); Carl Sagan Award for Public Understanding of Science (1993); National Academy of Sciences Public Welfare Medal (1994)
- Scientific career
- Fields: Astronomy; astrophysics; cosmology; astrobiology; space science; planetary science
- Workplaces: University of Chicago; Cornell University; Harvard University; Smithsonian Astrophysical Observatory; University of California, Berkeley
- Thesis: Physical studies of planets (1960)
- Doctoral advisor: Gerard Kuiper
- Doctoral students: David Morrison; Clark Chapman; James B. Pollack; Owen Toon; Christopher Chyba; Steven Soter

Carl Edward Sagan (/ˈseɪɡən/; SAY-gən; November 9, 1934 – December 20, 1996) was an American astronomer, planetary scientist and science communicator. Initially an assistant professor at Harvard, Sagan later moved to Cornell, where he was the David Duncan Professor of Astronomy and Space Sciences and directed the Laboratory for Planetary Studies. He played an active role in the Mariner, Viking and Voyager programs. He published more than 600 scientific papers and articles and several popular science books, starting with The Cosmic Connection. He won the Pulitzer Prize for General Nonfiction for The Dragons of Eden.

He co-wrote and narrated the 1980 documentary series Cosmos: A Personal Voyage, which has been seen by at least 500 million people in 60 countries and won two Emmy Awards and a Peabody Award. Cosmos, the companion volume, was the bestselling science book to date.

A lifelong science fiction fan, Sagan entered the genre with Contact, which was adapted as the film of the same name. He was a founding member and first president of the Planetary Society. He proposed the Pale Blue Dot photograph of Earth taken by Voyager 1.

He had a lifelong interest in the possibility of extraterrestrial life and is generally credited with contributions to the Arecibo message, with a much more significant role developing the Pioneer plaques and the Voyager Golden Record, universal messages that could potentially be understood by any intelligence that might find them. He promoted skepticism and the scientific method, particularly in his penultimate book The Demon-Haunted World. He popularized a toolkit for critical thinking. He made famous the maxim "Extraordinary claims require extraordinary evidence." The phrase "Billions and billions" was attributed to him, although he never said it; he did use it as the title of his last book. Sagan received numerous awards and honors, including the NASA Distinguished Public Service Medal and the National Academy of Sciences Public Welfare Medal. He married three times and had five children. After developing myelodysplasia, Sagan died of pneumonia at the age of 62 on December 20, 1996.

== Early life ==
=== Childhood ===
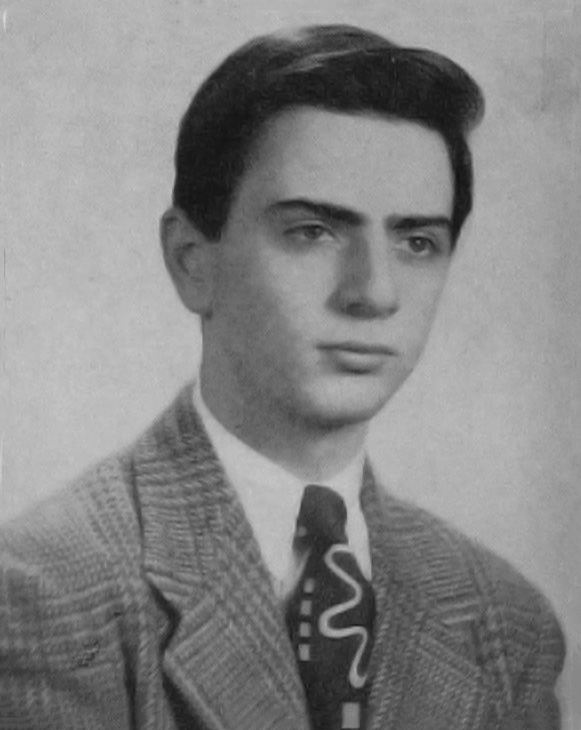
Sagan (age 16) in the 1951 Rahway High School yearbook

Carl Edward Sagan was born on November 9, 1934, in the Bensonhurst neighborhood of New York City's Brooklyn borough. His mother, Rachel Molly Gruber (1906–1982), was a housewife from New York City; his father, Samuel Sagan (1905–1979), was a Ukrainian-born garment worker who had emigrated from Kamianets-Podilskyi (then in the Russian Empire). Sagan was named in honor of his maternal grandmother, Chaiya Clara, who had died while giving birth to her second child; she was, in Sagan's words, "the mother she [Rachel] never knew." Sagan's family lived in a modest apartment in Bensonhurst. He later described his family as Reform Jews, one of the more liberal of Judaism's four main branches. He and his sister agreed that their father was not especially religious, but that their mother "definitely believed in God, and was active in the temple [...] and served only kosher meat." During the worst years of the Great Depression, his father worked as a movie theater usher.

According to biographer Keay Davidson, Sagan traced his analytical inclinations to his mother, who had been extremely poor as a child in New York City during World War I and the 1920s, and whose later intellectual ambitions were sabotaged by her poverty, status as a woman and wife, and Jewish ethnicity. Davidson suggested she "worshipped her only son, Carl" because "he would fulfill her unfulfilled dreams." Sagan traced his sense of wonder to his father, who spent his free time giving apples to the poor or helping soothe tensions between workers and management within New York City's garment industry. Sagan said: "My parents were not scientists. They knew almost nothing about science. But in introducing me simultaneously to skepticism and to wonder, they taught me the two uneasily cohabiting modes of thought that are central to the scientific method."

He described a defining moment in his development, when his parents took him to the 1939 New York World's Fair. He recalled his vivid memories of several exhibits there. One, Futurama, included a moving map, which, as he recalled, "showed beautiful highways and cloverleaves and little General Motors cars all carrying people to skyscrapers, buildings with lovely spires, flying buttresses—and it looked great!" Another involved a flashlight shining on a photoelectric cell, which created a crackling sound, and another showed how the sound from a tuning fork became a wave on an oscilloscope. He saw an exhibit of the nascent medium of television. He later wrote: "Plainly, the world held wonders of a kind I had never guessed. How could a tone become a picture and light become a noise?" Sagan saw one of the fair's most publicized events: the burial at Flushing Meadows of a time capsule, which contained mementos from the 1930s to be recovered in the far future. Davidson wrote that this "thrilled Carl." As an adult, Sagan and his colleagues would create similar time capsules to be sent out into space.

During World War II, Sagan's parents worried about the fate of their European relatives, but he was generally unaware of the details of the ongoing war. He wrote, "Sure, we had relatives who were caught up in the Holocaust. Hitler was not a popular fellow in our household... but on the other hand, I was fairly insulated from the horrors of the war." His sister, Carol, said that their mother "above all wanted to protect Carl... she had an extraordinarily difficult time dealing with World War II and the Holocaust."

He wondered what the stars were, but no one could give him a clear answer. He recalled:

As soon as I was old enough, my parents gave me my very first library card. I think the library was on 85th Street, an alien land. Immediately, I asked the librarian for something on stars. She returned with a picture book displaying portraits of men and women with names like Clark Gable and Jean Harlow. I complained, and for some reason then obscure to me, she smiled and found another book—the right kind of book. I opened it breathlessly and read until I found it. The book said something astonishing, a very big thought. It said that the stars were suns, but very far away. The Sun was a star, but close up... I was innocent of the notion of the inverse square law for light propagation. I had not the ghost of a chance of calculating the distance to the stars. But I could tell that if the stars were suns, they had to be very far away—farther away than 85th Street, farther away than Manhattan, farther away, probably, than New Jersey. The Cosmos was much bigger than I had guessed.

He said: "The scale of the universe suddenly opened up to me. It was a kind of religious experience. There was a magnificence to it, a grandeur, a scale which has never left me. Never ever left me." At age six or seven, he and a close friend took trips to the American Museum of Natural History. They were impressed by the displays of dinosaur fossils and nature dioramas and by the Hayden Planetarium. Sagan's parents nurtured his growing interest in science, buying him chemistry sets and reading matter. Per biographer Ray Spangenburg, Sagan's desire to understand the Cosmos became a "driving force in his life, a continual spark to his intellect, and a quest that would never be forgotten." His fascination with outer space deepened after reading Edgar Rice Burroughs's John Carter of Mars books. In 1947, he discovered Astounding Science Fiction, which introduced him to more hard science fiction speculations: "Each month I eagerly awaited the arrival of Astounding. I read Verne and Wells, read, cover‐to‐cover, the first two science‐fiction anthologies that I was able to find, devised scorecards, similar to those I was fond of making for baseball, on the quality of the stories I read. Many ranked high in asking interesting questions but low in answering them."

=== Education ===
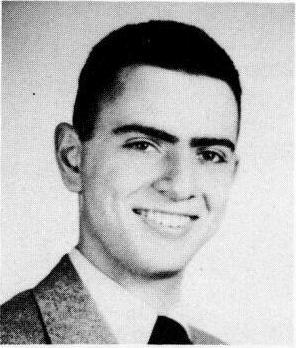
Sagan in the University of Chicago's 1954 yearbook

Sagan attended David A. Boody Junior High School, in his native Bensonhurst and had his bar mitzvah when he turned 13. In 1948, when he was 14, his father's work took the family to Rahway, New Jersey, where he attended Rahway High School. He was a straight-A student but was bored because his classes did not challenge him and his teachers did not inspire him. His teachers realized this and tried to convince his parents to send him to a private school, with an administrator telling them, "This kid ought to go to a school for gifted children, he has something really remarkable." However, his parents could not afford to do so. Sagan became president of the school's chemistry club, and set up his own laboratory at home. He taught himself about molecules by making cardboard cutouts to help him visualize how they were formed: "I found that about as interesting as doing [chemical] experiments." He was mostly interested in astronomy, studying it in his spare time. In his junior year of high school, he discovered that professional astronomers were paid for doing something he always enjoyed. "That was a splendid day—when I began to suspect that if I tried hard I could do astronomy full-time."

Before finishing high school, Sagan entered an essay writing contest in which he explored the idea that human contact with advanced extraterrestrials might be as disastrous for people on Earth as Native Americans' first contact with Europeans had been for Native Americans. The subject was considered controversial, but his rhetorical skill won over the judges and they awarded him first prize. When he was about to graduate from high school, his classmates voted him "most likely to succeed" and put him in line to be valedictorian. In 1950, Sagan wrote the essay "Space, Time, and the Poet" for his high school newspaper. In it, he mused on man's place in the universe as expressed by poets like T. S. Eliot and Alfred, Lord Tennyson and "the work containing perhaps the greatest poetry—the Bible." He graduated from Rahway High School in 1951.

He attended the University of Chicago as it was one of the few colleges he had applied to that would accept a 16 year old. Robert M. Hutchins, its chancellor, had recently retooled the College of the University of Chicago into an "ideal meritocracy" built on Great Books, Socratic dialogue, comprehensive examinations, and early entrance to college. He joined the Ryerson Astronomical Society. He wrote "College was the fulfillment of my dreams. I found teachers who not only understood science, but were actually able to explain it. … I was a physics student in a department orbiting around Enrico Fermi; I discovered what true mathematical elegance is from Subrahmanyan Chandrasekhar; I was given the chance to talk chemistry with Harold Urey; over summers I was apprenticed in biology to H. J. Muller at Indiana University; and I learned planetary astronomy from its only full-time practitioner at the time, G. P. Kuiper." The Miller-Urey experiment, conducted in 1952, sparked his interest in the origin of life. Under Urey, he wrote "Radiation and the Origin of the Gene." He recalled that "science was presented as an integral part of the gorgeous tapestry of human knowledge. It was considered unthinkable for an aspiring physicist not to know Plato, Aristotle, Bach, Shakespeare, Gibbon, Malinowski and Freud—among many others."

He was awarded a Bachelor of Liberal Arts with general and special honors in what he quipped was "nothing." In 1955, he earned a Bachelor of Science in physics. He went on to do graduate work at the University of Chicago, earning a Master of Science in physics in 1956 and a Doctor of Philosophy in astronomy and astrophysics in 1960. His doctoral thesis, under the direction of Kuiper, was "Physical Studies of the Planets". During his graduate studies, he spent summers working with Kuiper, as well as chemist Melvin Calvin and physicist George Gamow. He credited Kuiper with teaching him back-of-the-envelope calculations: "A possible explanation to a problem occurs to you, you pull out an old envelope, appeal to your knowledge of fundamental physics, scribble a few approximate equations on the envelope, and see if your answer comes anywhere near explaining your problem. If not, you look for a different explanation. It cut through nonsense like a knife through butter."

In 1958, Sagan and Kuiper worked on the classified military Project A119, a secret United States Air Force plan to detonate a nuclear warhead on the Moon and document its effects. Sagan had a Top Secret clearance at the Air Force and a Secret clearance with NASA. In 1999, an article published in the journal Nature revealed that Sagan had included the classified titles of two Project A119 papers in his 1959 application for a scholarship to University of California, Berkeley. A follow-up letter to the journal by project leader Leonard Reiffel confirmed Sagan's security leak.

== Career and research ==
Sagan is one of those discussing the likelihood of life on other planets in Who's Out There? (1973), an award-winning NASA documentary film by Robert Drew.

From 1960 to 1962, Sagan was a Miller Fellow at the University of California, Berkeley. Meanwhile, he published an article in 1961 in the journal Science on the atmosphere of Venus, while also working with NASA's Mariner 2 team, and served as a "Planetary Sciences Consultant" to the RAND Corporation.

After the publication of Sagan's Science article, in 1961, Harvard University astronomers Fred Whipple and Donald Menzel offered Sagan the opportunity to give a colloquium at Harvard and subsequently offered him a lecturer position at the institution. Sagan instead asked to be made an assistant professor, and eventually Whipple and Menzel were able to convince Harvard to offer Sagan the assistant professor position he requested. Sagan lectured, performed research, and advised graduate students at the institution from 1963 until 1968, as well as working at the Smithsonian Astrophysical Observatory, also located in Cambridge, Massachusetts.

In 1968, Sagan was denied academic tenure at Harvard. He later indicated that the decision was very unexpected. The denial has been blamed on several factors, including that he focused his interests too broadly across a number of areas (while the norm in academia is to become a renowned expert in a narrow specialty), and perhaps because of his well-publicized scientific advocacy, which some scientists perceived as borrowing the ideas of others for little more than self-promotion. An advisor from his years as an undergraduate student, Harold Urey, wrote a letter to the tenure committee recommending strongly against tenure for Sagan.

Long before the ill-fated tenure process, Cornell University astronomer Thomas Gold had courted Sagan to move to Ithaca, New York, and join the recently hired astronomer Frank Drake among the faculty at Cornell. Following the denial of tenure from Harvard, Sagan accepted Gold's offer and remained a faculty member at Cornell for nearly 30 years until his death in 1996. Unlike Harvard, the smaller and more laid-back astronomy department at Cornell welcomed Sagan's growing celebrity status. Following two years as an associate professor, Sagan became a full professor at Cornell in 1970 and directed the Laboratory for Planetary Studies there. From 1972 to 1981, he was associate director of the Center for Radiophysics and Space Research (CRSR) at Cornell. In 1976, he became the David Duncan Professor of Astronomy and Space Sciences, a position he held for the remainder of his life.

Sagan was associated with the U.S. space program from its inception. From the 1950s onward, he worked as an advisor to NASA, where one of his duties included briefing the Apollo astronauts before their flights to the Moon. Sagan contributed to many of the robotic spacecraft missions that explored the Solar System, arranging experiments on many of the expeditions. He often challenged the decisions to fund the Space Shuttle and the International Space Station at the expense of further robotic missions. Sagan assembled the first physical message that was sent into space: a gold-plated plaque, attached to the space probe Pioneer 10, launched in 1972. Pioneer 11, also carrying another copy of the plaque, was launched the following year. He continued to refine his designs. He contributed to the Voyager Golden Record, a sample of the sights and sounds of Earth sent with the Voyager space probes in 1977. Among much else, it features music by Bach, Beethoven and Chuck Berry.

=== Scientific achievements ===
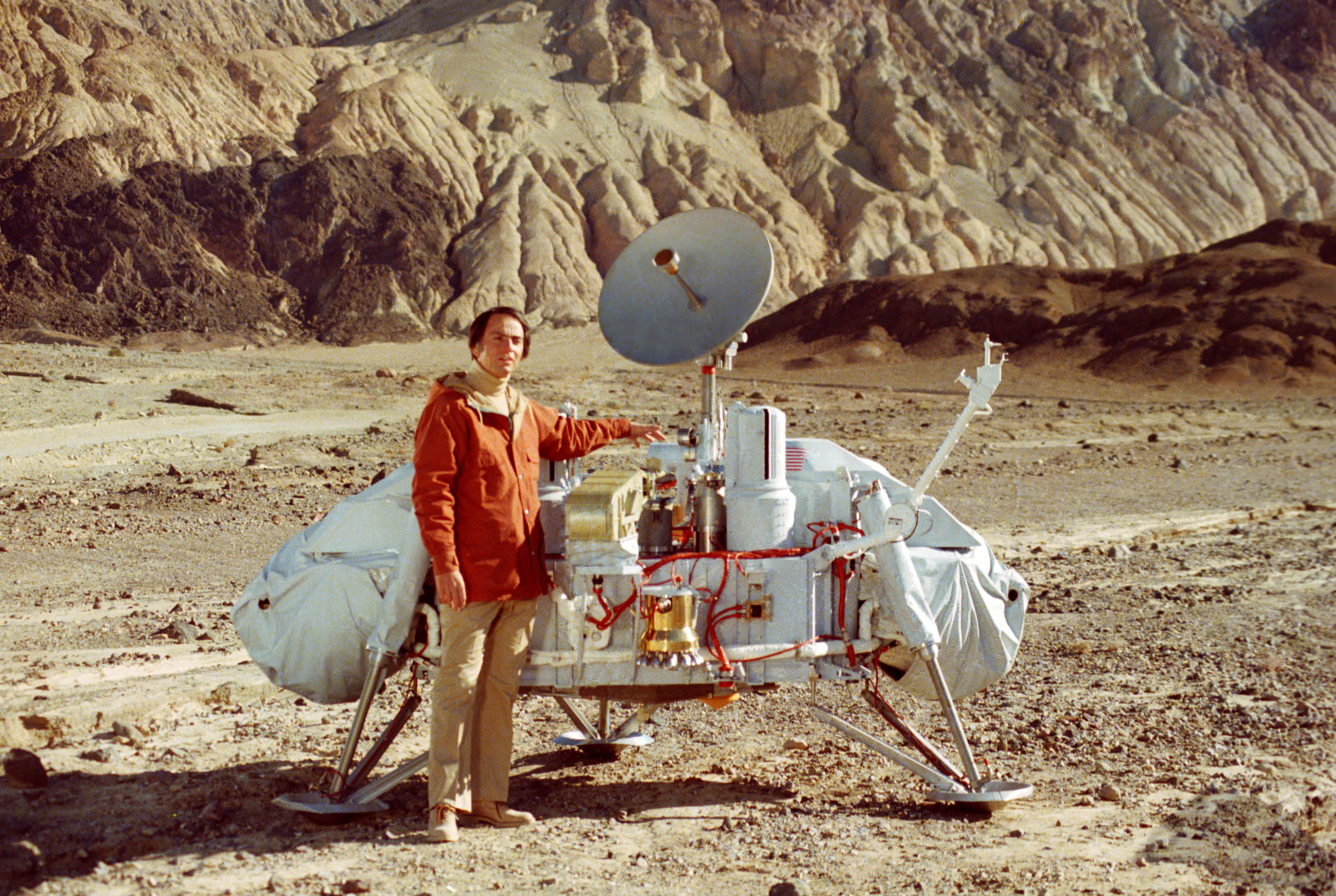
Sagan and the Viking spacecraft

Former student David Morrison described Sagan as "an 'idea person' and a master of intuitive physical arguments and 'back of the envelope' calculations", and Gerard Kuiper said that "Some persons work best in specializing on a major program in the laboratory; others are best in liaison between sciences. Dr. Sagan belongs in the latter group."

Sagan's contributions were central to the discovery of the high surface temperatures of the planet Venus. In the early 1960s no one knew for certain the basic conditions of Venus' surface, and Sagan listed the possibilities in a report later depicted for popularization in a Time Life book Planets. His own view was that Venus was dry and very hot as opposed to the balmy paradise others had imagined. He had investigated radio waves from Venus and concluded that there was a surface temperature of 500 °C (900 °F). As a visiting scientist to NASA's Jet Propulsion Laboratory, he contributed to the first Mariner missions to Venus, working on the design and management of the project. Mariner 2 confirmed his conclusions on the surface conditions of Venus in 1962.

Sagan was among the first to hypothesize that Saturn's moon Titan might possess oceans of liquid compounds on its surface and that Jupiter's moon Europa might possess subsurface oceans of water. This would make Europa potentially habitable. Europa's subsurface ocean of water was later indirectly confirmed by the spacecraft Galileo. The mystery of Titan's reddish haze was also solved with Sagan's help. The reddish haze was revealed to be due to complex organic molecules constantly raining down onto Titan's surface.

Sagan further contributed insights regarding the atmospheres of Venus and Jupiter, as well as seasonal changes on Mars. He also perceived climate change as a growing, man-made danger and likened it to the natural development of Venus into a hot, life-hostile planet through a kind of runaway greenhouse effect. He testified to the US Congress in 1985 that the greenhouse effect would change the Earth's climate system. Sagan and his Cornell colleague Edwin Ernest Salpeter speculated about life in Jupiter's clouds, given the planet's dense atmospheric composition rich in organic molecules. He studied the observed color variations on Mars' surface and concluded that they were not seasonal or vegetational changes as most believed, but shifts in surface dust caused by windstorms. He argued in favor of the hypothesis, which has since been accepted, that the high surface temperatures of Venus are the result of the greenhouse effect.

Sagan is also known for his research on the possibilities of extraterrestrial life, including experimental demonstration of the production of amino acids from basic chemicals by radiation.

As of 2017, Sagan is the most cited SETI scientist and one of the most cited planetary scientists.

He edited Icarus from 1975 to 1979. In 1980, he cofounded the Planetary Society.

=== Science popularization ===
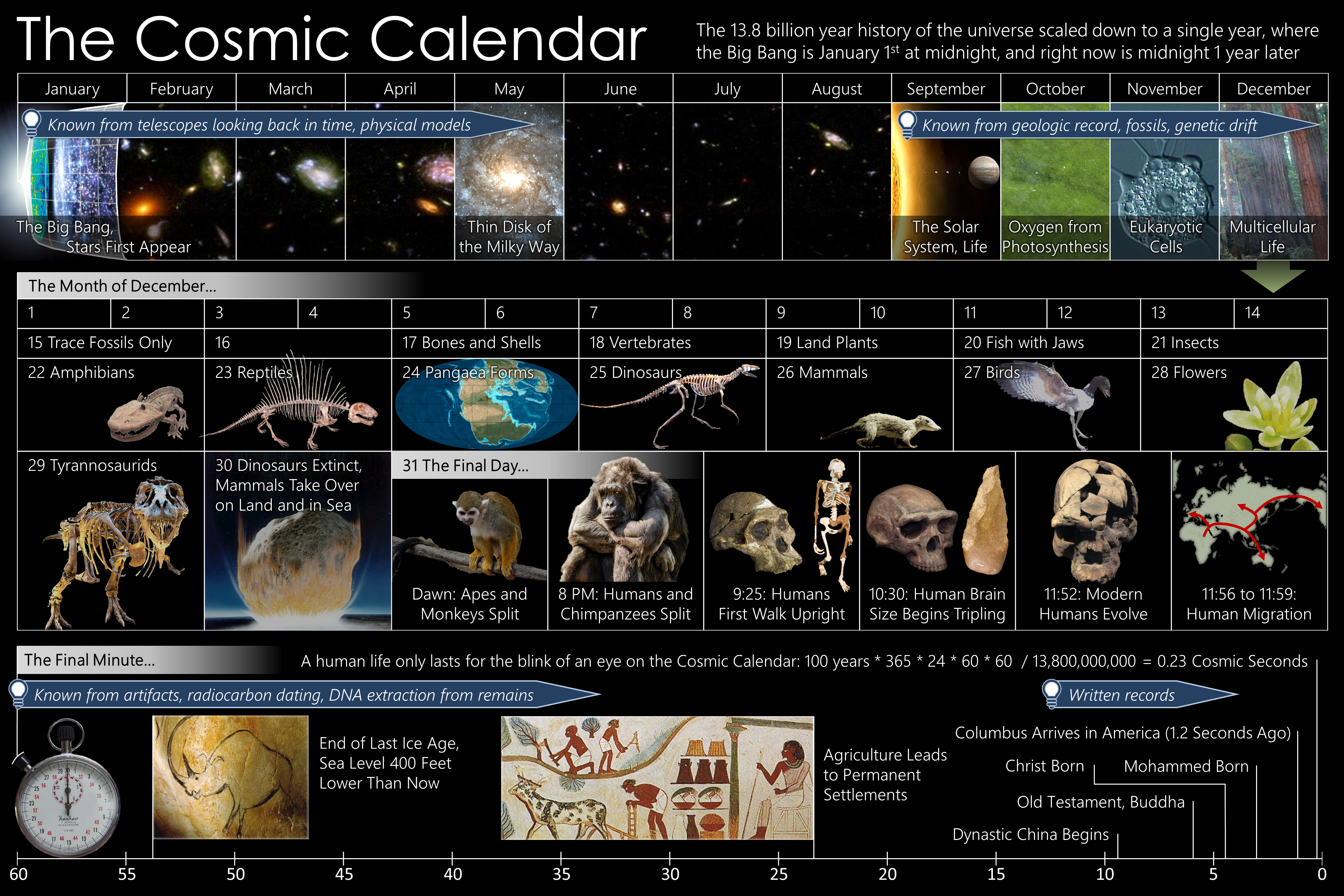
Carl Sagan popularized the Cosmic Calendar as a method to visualize the chronology of the universe, scaling its current age of 13.8 billion years to a single year to help intuit it for pedagogical purposes

Sagan wrote the Encyclopædia Britannica entry on Life, later updated by his first wife, the biologist Lynn Margulis. Sagan's first popular science book was The Cosmic Connection. He introduced the Cosmic Calendar in The Dragons of Eden, which won the 1978 Pulitzer Prize for General Nonfiction. He delivered the 1977 Royal Institution Christmas Lectures on The Planets.

Sagan in Cosmos (1980)

Sagan and Ann Druyan co-wrote the 13-part PBS documentary Cosmos: A Personal Voyage. It drew on earlier documentaries, notably Jacob Bronowski's The Ascent of Man. The production involved the recreation of the Library of Alexandria. It covered an array of scientific subjects, including the evolution of stars and how it is linked to the evolution of life. Frederic Golden wrote "The series' name comes from the Greek word for the ordered universe, the antithesis of chaos. It is an apt choice. Cosmos is nothing less than Sagan's attempt to make sense out of what is for many people the hopelessly baffling world of 20th century science. To unfold his story he roves through two millennia of scientific progress, often shuttling back and forth over the centuries like some Wellsian time traveler. One moment he is seated in a cafe on the Aegean island of Samos, home of Pythagoras and Aristarchus, explaining the first stirrings of Greek scientific prowess. At another moment, he is strolling through the venerable Cavendish Laboratories of England's Cambridge University, recounting the birth of modern atomic physics. Sagan makes science as palatable as the apple pie he lovingly cuts up in a Cambridge University dining room in order to make a point about matter." He offers an optimistic and a perspective of humans' place on Earth, arguing that "We are a way for the cosmos to know itself." Cosmos has been seen by at least 500 million people across 60 countries, making it the most widely watched series in the history of American public television until Ken Burns's The Civil War in 1990. Cosmos won an Emmy and a Peabody. It featured music by Bach, Vivaldi, Vangelis and others.

The accompanying book was well received. James Michener wrote "Mr. Sagan's essay, a spin-off from his hugely successful television show, is a cleverly written, imaginatively illustrated summary of his geological, anthropological, biological, historical and astronomical ruminations about our universe. His references comprise the entire scope of human history. His treatment, necessarily abbreviated, is highly personal. He is always readable, and because his mind ranges so far and wide, he seems exactly the right man for the job."

He wrote the introduction to Stephen Hawking's bestseller A Brief History of Time. In 1988, Magnus Magnusson moderated a discussion between Sagan, Hawking and Arthur C. Clarke, God, the Universe and Everything Else. He wrote a sequel to Cosmos, Pale Blue Dot. The title refers to the view of Earth from the Voyager spacecraft.

Sagan said that there were at least two reasons for scientists to share the purposes and findings of science. Simple self-interest was one: much of the funding for science came from the public, and the public therefore had the right to know how the money was being spent. If scientists increased public admiration for science, there was a good chance of having more public supporters. The other reason was the joy of communicating one's own excitement about science to others.

He wrote: "Among the best contemporary scientist-popularizers, I think of Stephen Jay Gould, E. O. Wilson, Lewis Thomas and Richard Dawkins in biology; Steven Weinberg, Alan Lightman and Kip Thorne in physics; Roald Hoffmann in chemistry; and the early works of Fred Hoyle in astronomy. (And while requiring calculus, the most consistently exciting, provocative, and inspiring science popularization of the last few decades seems to me to be Volume 1 of Richard Feynman's Introductory Lectures on Physics.)"

=== Science fiction ===
Sagan wrote that science fiction led him to science. He added that, while most of the science fiction he read in his youth didn't hold up, "the best of science fiction remains very good indeed. There are stories that are so tautly constructed, so rich in the accommodating details of an unfamiliar society that they sweep me along before I have even a chance to be critical. Such works include Robert Heinlein's The Door into Summer; Alfred Bester's The Stars My Destination and his The Demolished Man; Jack Finney's Time and Again; Frank Herbert's Dune, and Walter M. Miller's A Canticle for Leibowitz."

I have just finished The Cosmic Connection and loved every word of it. You are my idea of a good writer because you have an unmannered style, and when I read what you write, I hear you talking. One thing about the book made me nervous. It was entirely too obvious that you are smarter than I am. I hate that.

— Isaac Asimov, in a letter to Sagan, 1973

Sagan was acquainted with science fiction fandom through his friendship with Isaac Asimov, and he spoke at the Nebula Awards ceremony in 1969. Asimov described Sagan as one of only two people he ever met whose intellect surpassed his own, the other being computer scientist and artificial intelligence expert Marvin Minsky. Sagan briefly served as an adviser on Stanley Kubrick's 2001: A Space Odyssey. He proposed that the film suggest, rather than depict, extraterrestrial superintelligence. In 1971, he participated in a panel on Mars with Ray Bradbury, Arthur C. Clarke, Bruce C. Murray and Walter Sullivan, published as Mars and the Mind of Man. Sagan turned his pen to science fiction with Contact. He needed a way for his heroine, Ellie Arroway, to get from Earth to Vega, so he asked his friend Kip Thorne for advice on the physics of wormholes. This led to original research by Thorne on closed timelike curves.

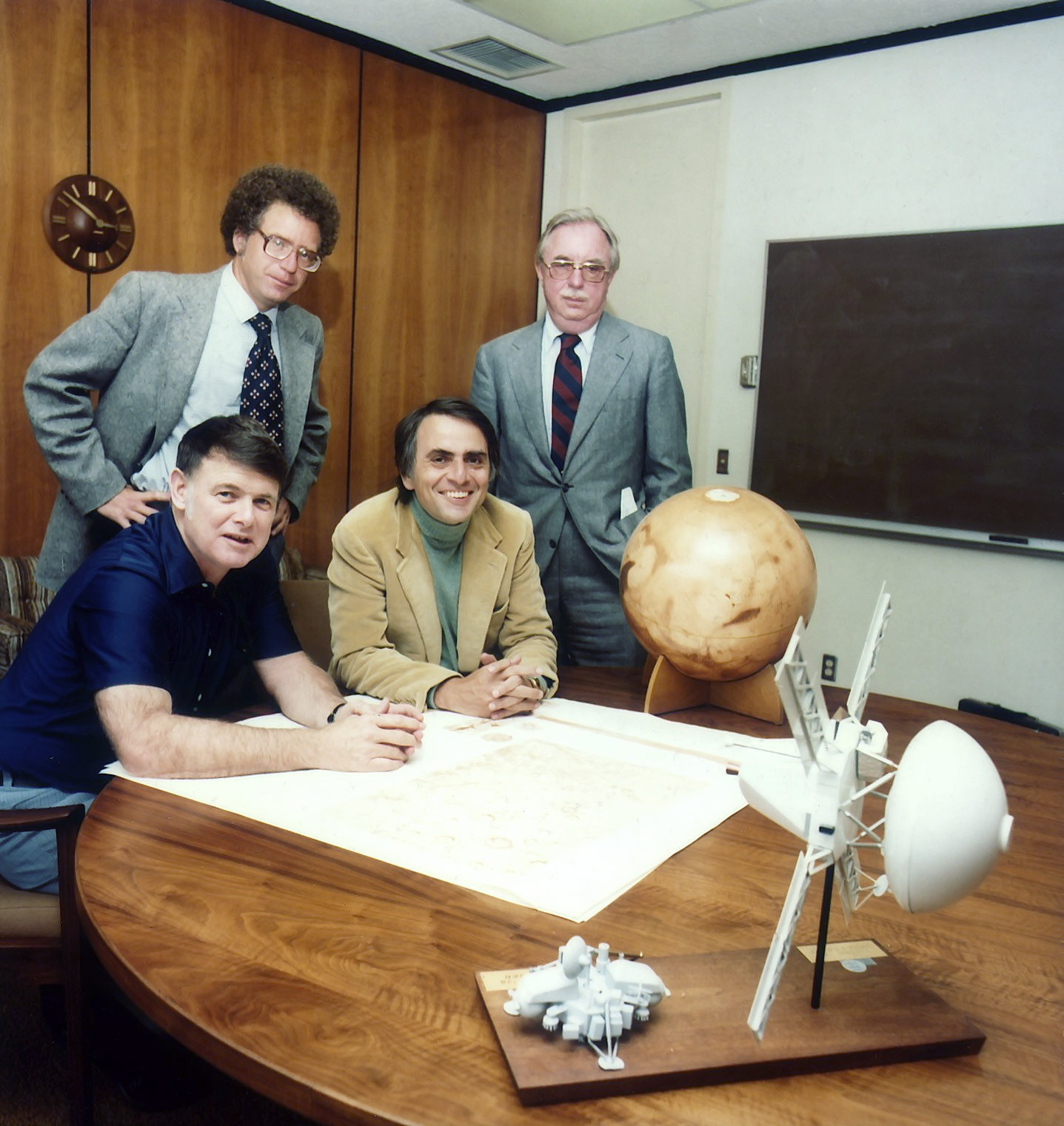
The Planetary Society members at the organization's founding. Sagan is seated on the bottom right.

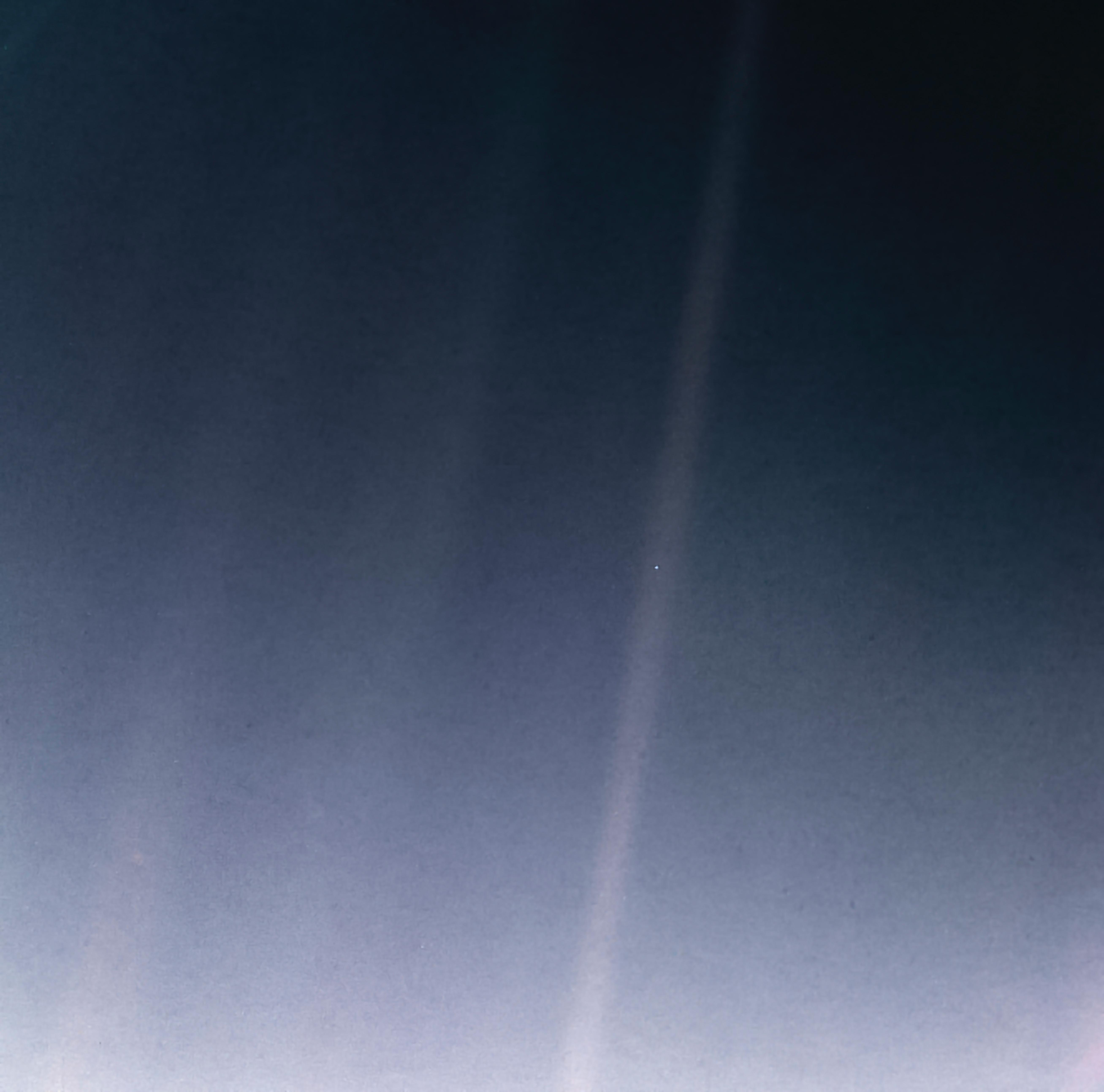
Pale Blue Dot: Earth is a bright pixel when photographed from Voyager 1, 6 billion kilometres (3.7 billion miles) away. Sagan encouraged NASA to generate this image. from Pale Blue Dot (1994) On it, everyone you ever heard of... The aggregate of all our joys and sufferings, thousands of confident religions, ideologies and economic doctrines, every hunter and forager, every hero and coward, every creator and destroyer of civilizations, every king and peasant, every young couple in love, every hopeful child, every mother and father, every inventor and explorer, every teacher of morals, every corrupt politician, every superstar, every supreme leader, every saint and sinner in the history of our species, lived there on a mote of dust, suspended in a sunbeam. ... Think of the rivers of blood spilled by all those generals and emperors so that in glory and triumph they could become the momentary masters of a fraction of a dot. — Carl Sagan, Cornell lecture in 1994

=== Skepticism ===
Sagan promoted scientific skepticism against pseudoscience. He credited Martin Gardner's Fads and Fallacies in the Name of Science and Charles Mackay's Extraordinary Popular Delusions and the Madness of Crowds with teaching him critical thinking. In 1974, he challenged Immanuel Velikovsky to a debate. He was a critic of practices like crystal healing and astrology. In a column for Parade, he proposed a "Baloney detection kit", a phrase coined by Arthur Felberbaum, a friend of his wife Ann Druyan. He expanded on it in his penultimate book, The Demon-Haunted World, a manifesto for scientific thinking. He lamented the fact that most newspapers had a daily column on astrology and very few had even a weekly column on astronomy.

He taught a Senior Seminar on "Critical Thinking".

Science is more than a body of knowledge; it is a way of thinking. I have a foreboding of an America in my children's or grandchildren's time – when the United States is a service and information economy; when nearly all the key manufacturing industries have slipped away to other countries; when awesome technological powers are in the hands of a very few, and no one representing the public interest can even grasp the issues; when the people have lost the ability to set their own agendas or knowledgeably question those in authority; when, clutching our crystals and nervously consulting our horoscopes, our critical faculties in decline, unable to distinguish between what feels good and what's true, we slide, almost without noticing, back into superstition and darkness... The dumbing down of America is most evident in the slow decay of substantive content in the enormously influential media, the 30 second sound bites (now down to 10 seconds or less), lowest common denominator programming, credulous presentations on pseudoscience and superstition, but especially a kind of celebration of ignorance.

One of his most famous quotations, "extraordinary claims require extraordinary evidence", is called the "Sagan standard" by some. It was based on a nearly identical statement by fellow founder of the Committee for the Scientific Investigation of Claims of the Paranormal, Marcello Truzzi, "An extraordinary claim requires extraordinary proof." This idea had been aphorized in Théodore Flournoy's From India to the Planet Mars (1899) from a longer quote by the French mathematician and astronomer Pierre-Simon Laplace as the Principle of Laplace: "The weight of the evidence should be proportioned to the strangeness of the facts."

He noted that science's predictive power distinguished it from pseudoscience: "If you want to know when the next eclipse of the Sun will be, you might try magicians and mystics, but you'll do much better with scientists. They will tell you where on Earth to stand, when you have to be there, and whether it will be a partial eclipse, a total eclipse, or an annular eclipse. They can routinely predict a solar eclipse, up to the minute, a century in advance. You can go to the witch doctor to lift the spell that causes your pernicious anemia, or you can take vitamin B12. If you want to save your child from polio, you can pray or you can inoculate."

=== Other interests ===
In his later years, Sagan proposed organizing a search for near-Earth objects (NEOs) that might impact the Earth but postponing the development of the technological methods needed to defend against them. He argued that all of the numerous methods proposed to alter the orbit of an asteroid, including the employment of nuclear detonations, created a deflection dilemma: if the ability to deflect an asteroid away from the Earth exists, then one would also have the ability to divert a non-threatening object towards Earth, creating an immensely destructive weapon. In a 1994 paper he co-authored, he ridiculed a three-day-long "Near-Earth Object Interception Workshop" held by Los Alamos National Laboratory (LANL) in 1993 that did not, "even in passing" state that such interception and deflection technologies could have these "ancillary dangers."

Sagan remained hopeful that the natural NEO impact threat and the intrinsically double-edged essence of the methods to prevent these threats would serve as a "new and potent motivation to maturing international relations." Later acknowledging that, with sufficient international oversight, in the future a "work our way up" approach to implementing nuclear explosive deflection methods could be fielded, and when sufficient knowledge was gained, to use them to aid in mining asteroids. His interest in the use of nuclear detonations in space grew out of his work in 1958 for the Armour Research Foundation's Project A119, concerning the possibility of detonating a nuclear device on the lunar surface.

He was an advocate for basic research, pointing out that it might prove to have practical applications in the future: "Maxwell wasn't thinking of radio, radar, and television when he first scratched out the fundamental equations of electromagnetism; Newton wasn't dreaming of space flight or communications satellites when he first understood the motion of the Moon; Roentgen wasn't contemplating medical diagnosis when he investigated a penetrating radiation so mysterious he called it 'X-rays'; Curie wasn't thinking of cancer therapy when she painstakingly extracted minute amounts of radium from tons of pitchblende; Fleming wasn't planning on saving the lives of millions with antibiotics when he noticed a circle free of bacteria around a growth of mold; Watson and Crick weren't imagining the cure of genetic diseases when they puzzled over the X-ray diffractometry of DNA…"

=== Sagan's number ===
Sagan's number is the number of stars in the observable universe. This number is reasonably well defined, because it is known what stars are and what the observable universe is, but its value is highly uncertain.

- In 1980, Sagan estimated it to be 10 sextillion in short scale (10^{22}).
- In 2003, it was estimated to be 70 sextillion (7 × 10^{22}).
- In 2010, it was estimated to be 300 sextillion (3 × 10^{23}).

=== "Billions and billions" ===
After Cosmos aired, Sagan became associated with the catchphrase "billions and billions", although he never actually said it. He rather used the term "billions upon billions."

Richard Feynman used the phrase "billions and billions" many times in his Lectures on Physics. However, Sagan's frequent use of the word billions and distinctive delivery emphasizing the "b" (which he did intentionally, in place of more cumbersome alternatives such as "billions with a 'b'", in order to distinguish the word from "millions") was spoofed by Johnny Carson. Sagan was a friend of Carson's and a frequent guest on the Tonight Show.

Other comedians followed Carson's lead, including Gary Kroeger, Mike Myers, Bronson Pinchot, Penn Jillette, Harry Shearer, and others. Frank Zappa satirized the line in the song "Be in My Video". Sagan took this all in good humor, and his final book was titled Billions and Billions, which opened with a tongue-in-cheek discussion of this catchphrase, observing that Carson was an amateur astronomer and that Carson's comic caricature often included real science.

In 1993, engineers at Apple Computer code-named the Power Macintosh 7100 "Carl Sagan" in the hope that Apple would make "billions and billions". The name was only used internally, but Sagan was concerned that it would become a product endorsement and sent Apple a cease-and-desist letter. Apple complied, but engineers retaliated by changing the internal codename to "BHA" for "Butt-Head Astronomer." In November 1995, after further legal battle, an out-of-court settlement was reached and Apple's office of trademarks and patents released a conciliatory statement that "Apple has always had great respect for Dr. Sagan. It was never Apple's intention to cause Dr. Sagan or his family any embarrassment or concern."

As a humorous tribute to Sagan and his association with the catchphrase "billions and billions", a sagan has been defined as a unit of measurement equivalent to a very large number of anything.

=== Criticisms ===
While Sagan was widely adored by the general public, his reputation in the scientific community was more polarized. Critics sometimes characterized his work as fanciful, non-rigorous, and self-aggrandizing, and others complained in his later years that he neglected his role as a faculty member to foster his celebrity status.

One of Sagan's harshest critics, Harold Urey, felt that Sagan was getting too much publicity for a scientist and was treating some scientific theories too casually. Urey and Sagan were said to have different philosophies of science, according to Davidson. While Urey was an "old-time empiricist" who avoided theorizing about the unknown, Sagan was by contrast willing to speculate openly about such matters. Fred Whipple wanted Harvard to keep Sagan there, but learned that because Urey was a Nobel laureate, his opinion was an important factor in Harvard denying Sagan tenure.

Sagan's Harvard friend Lester Grinspoon also stated: "I know Harvard well enough to know there are people there who certainly do not like people who are outspoken." Grinspoon added:

Wherever you turned, there was one astronomer being quoted on everything, one astronomer whose face you were seeing on TV, and one astronomer whose books had the preferred display slot at the local bookstore.

Some, like Urey, later believed that Sagan's popular brand of scientific advocacy was beneficial to the science as a whole. Urey especially liked Sagan's 1977 book The Dragons of Eden and wrote Sagan with his opinion: "I like it very much and am amazed that someone like you has such an intimate knowledge of the various features of the problem... I congratulate you... You are a man of many talents."

Sagan was accused of borrowing some ideas of others for his own benefit and countered these claims by explaining that the misappropriation was an unfortunate side effect of his role as a science communicator and explainer, and that he attempted to give proper credit whenever possible.

=== Social concerns ===
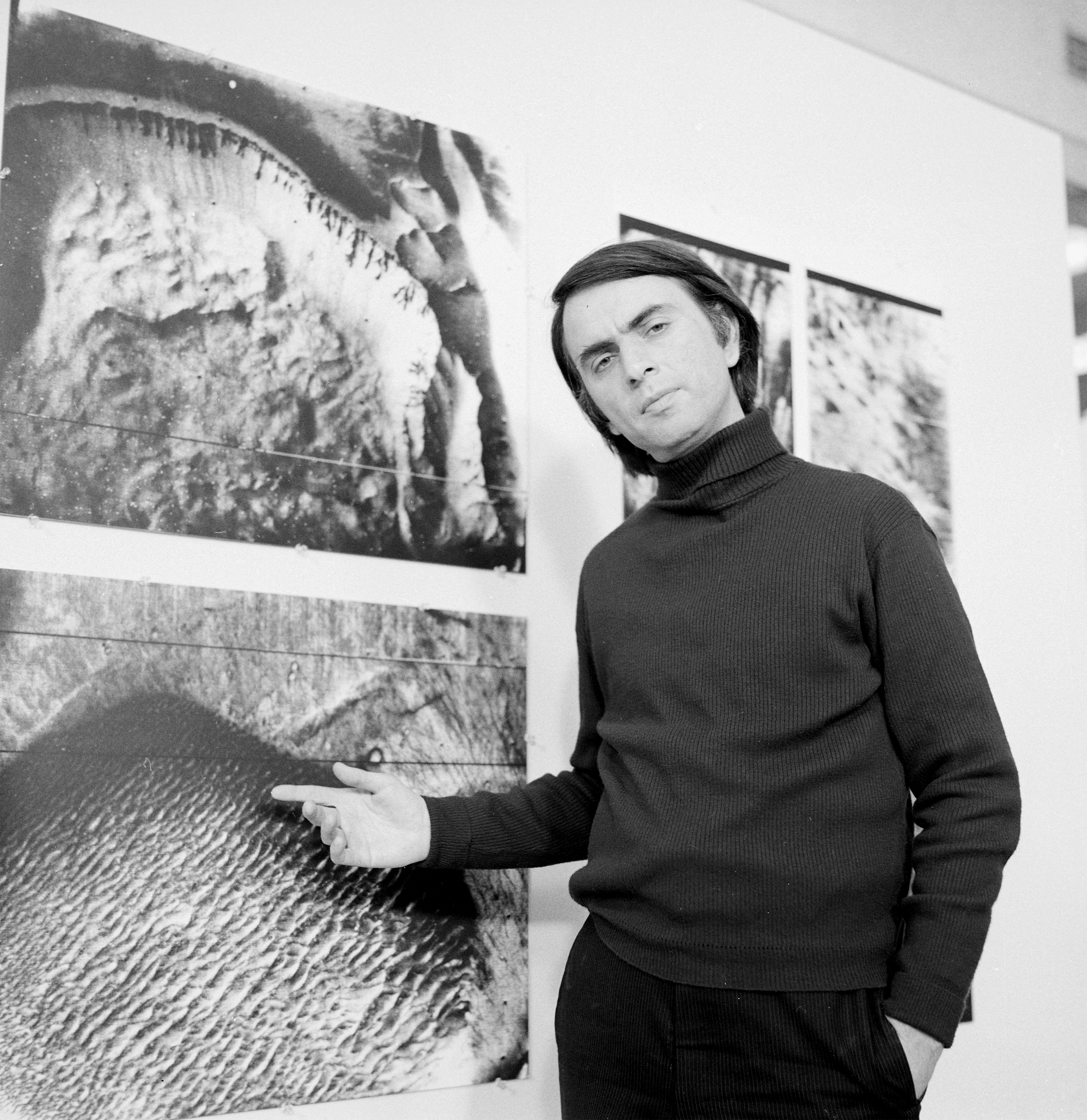
Sagan with Mariner 9's photos of Mars

At the height of the Cold War, Sagan became involved in nuclear disarmament efforts by promoting hypotheses on the effects of nuclear war, when Paul Crutzen's "Twilight at Noon" concept suggested that a substantial nuclear exchange could trigger a nuclear twilight and upset the delicate balance of life on Earth by cooling the surface. In 1983, he was one of five authors—the "S"—in the follow-up "TTAPS" model (as the research article came to be known), which contained the first use of the term "nuclear winter", which his colleague Richard P. Turco had coined. In 1984, he co-authored the book The Cold and the Dark: The World after Nuclear War and in 1990, the book A Path Where No Man Thought: Nuclear Winter and the End of the Arms Race, which explains the nuclear-winter hypothesis and advocates nuclear disarmament. Sagan received a great deal of skepticism and disdain for the use of media to disseminate a very uncertain hypothesis. A personal correspondence with nuclear physicist Edward Teller around 1983 began amicably, with Teller expressing support for continued research to ascertain the credibility of the winter hypothesis. However, Sagan and Teller's correspondence would ultimately result in Teller writing: "A propagandist is one who uses incomplete information to produce maximum persuasion. I can compliment you on being, indeed, an excellent propagandist, remembering that a propagandist is the better the less he appears to be one." Biographers of Sagan would also comment that from a scientific viewpoint, nuclear winter was a low point for Sagan, although, politically speaking, it popularized his image among the public.

Sagan believed that the Drake equation suggested that a large number of extraterrestrial civilizations would form, but that the lack of evidence of such civilizations highlighted by the Fermi paradox suggests technological civilizations tend to self-destruct. This stimulated his interest in identifying and publicizing ways that humanity could destroy itself, with the hope of avoiding such a cataclysm and eventually becoming a spacefaring species. Sagan's deep concern regarding the potential destruction of human civilization in a nuclear holocaust was conveyed in a memorable cinematic sequence in the final episode of Cosmos, "Who Speaks for Earth?" Sagan had already resigned from the Air Force Scientific Advisory Board's UFO-investigating Condon Committee and voluntarily surrendered his top-secret clearance in protest over the Vietnam War. Following his marriage to his third wife (novelist Ann Druyan) in June 1981, Sagan became more politically active—particularly in opposing escalation of the nuclear arms race under President Ronald Reagan.

The United States and Soviet Union/Russia nuclear stockpiles, in total number of nuclear bombs/warheads in existence throughout the Cold War and post-Cold War era

In March 1983, Reagan announced the Strategic Defense Initiative—a multibillion-dollar project to develop a comprehensive defense against attack by nuclear missiles, which was quickly dubbed "Star Wars". Sagan, along with other scientists, spoke out against the project, arguing that it was technically impossible to develop a system with the level of perfection required, and far more expensive to build such a system than it would be for an enemy to defeat it through decoys and other means—and that its construction would seriously destabilize the "nuclear balance" between the United States and the Soviet Union, making further progress toward nuclear disarmament impossible.

When Soviet leader Mikhail Gorbachev declared a unilateral moratorium on the testing of nuclear weapons, which would begin on August 6, 1985—the 40th anniversary of the atomic bombing of Hiroshima—the Reagan administration dismissed the dramatic move as nothing more than propaganda and refused to follow suit. In response, US anti-nuclear and peace activists staged a series of protest actions at the Nevada Test Site, beginning on Easter Sunday in 1986 and continuing through 1987. Hundreds of people in the "Nevada Desert Experience" group were arrested, including Sagan, who was arrested on two separate occasions as he climbed over a chain-link fence at the test site during the underground Operation Charioteer and United States's Musketeer nuclear test series of detonations.

He was an advocate for free speech and civil liberties. His professor Edward Condon, during the McCarthy era, was accused by HUAC of being a "revolutionary in physics". Sagan quotes Condon as replying: "I believe in Archimedes' Principle, formulated in the third century B. C. I believe in Kepler's laws of planetary motion, discovered in the seventeenth century. I believe in Newton's laws…", going on to invoke Bernoulli, Fourier, Ampère, Boltzmann, and Maxwell. The committee was not amused. "But the most they were able to pin on Condon, as I recall, was that in high school he had a job delivering a socialist newspaper door-to-door on his bicycle." When visiting the Soviet Union, he and Druyan would smuggle in banned books.

In a speech given at Monticello on July 4, 1992, Sagan emphasized the importance of science to Thomas Jefferson, John Adams, Benjamin Franklin and democracy in America:

It is a fact of life on our beleaguered little planet that widespread torture, famine and governmental criminal corruption are more likely to be found in tyrannical than in democratic governments. Why? Because the rulers of the former are much less likely to be thrown out of office for their misdeeds than the rulers of the latter. This is the error correction machinery in politics.

He notes that "New ideas, invention, and creativity in general, always spearhead a new kind of freedom—a breaking out from hobbling constraints. Freedom is a prerequisite for continuing the delicate experiment of science—which is one reason the Soviet Union could not remain a totalitarian state and remain technically competitive. At the same time, science—or rather its delicate mix of openness and skepticism, and its encouragement of diversity and debate—is a prerequisite for continuing the delicate experiment of freedom in an industrial and highly technological society."

He concludes:

Education on the value of free speech and the other freedoms reserved by the Bill of Rights, about what happens when you don't have them, and about how to exercise and protect them, should be an essential prerequisite for being an American citizen — or indeed a citizen of any nation, the more so to the degree that such rights remain unprotected. If we can't think for ourselves, if we're unwilling to question authority, then we're just putty in the hands of those in power. But if the citizens are educated and form their own opinions, then those in power work for us. In every country, we should be teaching our children the scientific method and the reasons for a Bill of Rights. With it comes a certain decency, humility and community spirit.

== Personal life and beliefs ==
Sagan was married three times. In 1957, he married biologist Lynn Margulis. The couple had two children, Jeremy and Dorion Sagan. According to Margulis, Sagan left her to do the majority of the domestic duties, believing he was above them. Their marriage ended in 1964. Sagan married artist Linda Salzman in 1968 and they had a child together, Nick Sagan, and divorced in 1981. During these marriages, Carl Sagan focused heavily on his career, a factor which may have contributed to Sagan's first divorce. In 1981, Sagan married author Ann Druyan and they later had two children, Alexandra (known as Sasha) and Samuel Sagan. Carl Sagan and Druyan remained married until his death in 1996.

Sagan was a proponent of the search for extraterrestrial life. He urged the scientific community to listen with radio telescopes for signals from potential intelligent extraterrestrial life-forms. Sagan was so persuasive that by 1982 he was able to get a petition advocating SETI published in the journal Science, signed by 70 scientists, including seven Nobel Prize winners. This signaled a tremendous increase in the respectability of a then-controversial field. He may have contributed to Frank Drake's Arecibo message, a radio message beamed into space from the Arecibo Observatory on November 16, 1974, aimed at informing potential extraterrestrials about Earth.

Sagan was chief technology officer of the professional planetary research journal Icarus for 12 years. He co-founded The Planetary Society and was a member of the SETI Institute Board of Trustees. Sagan served as Chairman of the Division for Planetary Science of the American Astronomical Society, as President of the Planetology Section of the American Geophysical Union, and as Chairman of the Astronomy Section of the American Association for the Advancement of Science (AAAS).

While teaching at Cornell University, he lived in an Egyptian revival house perched on the edge of a cliff in Ithaca. While there he drove a red Porsche 911 Targa and an orange 1970 Porsche 914 with the license plate PHOBOS.

=== Naturalism ===
Sagan wrote frequently about religion and the relationship between religion and science, expressing his skepticism about the conventional conceptualization of God as a sapient being. For example:

Some people think God is an outsized, light-skinned male with a long white beard, sitting on a throne somewhere up there in the sky, busily tallying the fall of every sparrow. Others—for example Baruch Spinoza and Albert Einstein—considered God to be essentially the sum total of the physical laws which describe the universe. I do not know of any compelling evidence for anthropomorphic patriarchs controlling human destiny from some hidden celestial vantage point, but it would be madness to deny the existence of physical laws.

In reply to a question in 1996 about his religious beliefs, Sagan said he was agnostic. Sagan maintained that the idea of a creator God of the Universe was difficult to prove or disprove and that the only conceivable scientific discovery that could challenge it would be an infinitely old universe. His son Dorion Sagan, said, "My father believed in the God of Spinoza and Einstein, God not behind nature but as nature, equivalent to it."

On atheism, Sagan said in 1981:

An atheist is someone who is certain that God does not exist, someone who has compelling evidence against the existence of God. I know of no such compelling evidence. Because God can be relegated to remote times and places and to ultimate causes, we would have to know a great deal more about the universe than we do now to be sure that no such God exists. To be certain of the existence of God and to be certain of the nonexistence of God seem to me to be the confident extremes in a subject so riddled with doubt and uncertainty as to inspire very little confidence indeed.

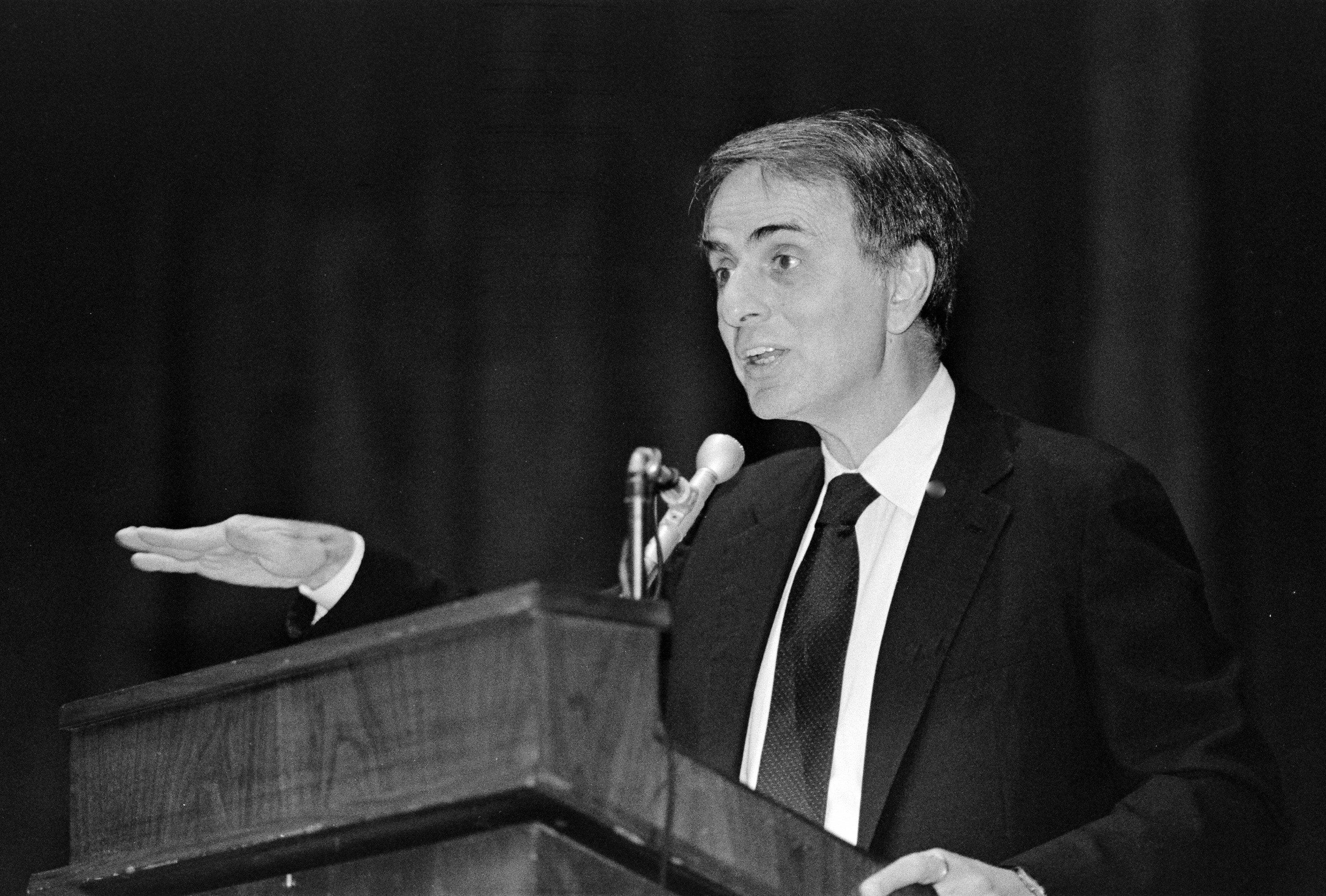
Sagan in 1987

Sagan also commented on Christianity and the Jefferson Bible, stating, "My long-time view about Christianity is that it represents an amalgam of two seemingly immiscible parts, the religion of Jesus and the religion of Paul. Thomas Jefferson attempted to excise the Pauline parts of the New Testament. There wasn't much left when he was done, but it was an inspiring document."

Sagan thought that spirituality should be scientifically informed and that traditional religions should be abandoned and replaced with belief systems that revolve around the scientific method, but also the mystery and incompleteness of scientific fields. Regarding spirituality and its relationship with science, Sagan stated:

'Spirit' comes from the Latin word 'to breathe'. What we breathe is air, which is certainly matter, however thin. Despite usage to the contrary, there is no necessary implication in the word 'spiritual' that we are talking of anything other than matter (including the matter of which the brain is made), or anything outside the realm of science. On occasion, I will feel free to use the word. Science is not only compatible with spirituality; it is a profound source of spirituality. When we recognize our place in an immensity of light-years and in the passage of ages, when we grasp the intricacy, beauty, and subtlety of life, then that soaring feeling, that sense of elation and humility combined, is surely spiritual. So are our feelings in the presence of great art or music or literature, or acts of exemplary selfless courage, such as those of Mohandas Gandhi or Martin Luther King, Jr. The notion that science and spirituality are somehow mutually exclusive does a disservice to both.

An environmental appeal, "Preserving and Cherishing the Earth", written primarily by Sagan and signed by him and other noted scientists as well as religious leaders and published in January 1990, stated that "The historical record makes clear that religious teaching, example, and leadership are powerfully able to influence personal conduct and commitment... Thus, there is a vital role for religion and science."

When my husband died, because he was so famous and known for not being a believer, many people would come up to me-it still sometimes happens-and ask me if Carl changed at the end and converted to a belief in an afterlife. They also frequently ask me if I think I will see him again. Carl faced his death with unflagging courage and never sought refuge in illusions. The tragedy was that we knew we would never see each other again.

I don't ever expect to be reunited with Carl. But, the great thing is that when we were together, for nearly twenty years, we lived with a vivid appreciation of how brief and precious life is. We never trivialized the meaning of death by pretending it was anything other than a final parting.

Every single moment that we were alive and we were together was miraculous-not miraculous in the sense of inexplicable or supernatural. We knew we were beneficiaries of chance... That pure chance could be so generous and so kind... That we could find each other, as Carl wrote so beautifully in Cosmos, you know, in the vastness of space and the immensity of time... That we could be together for twenty years. That is something which sustains me and it's much more meaningful... The way he treated me and the way I treated him, the way we took care of each other and our family, while he lived. That is so much more important than the idea I will see him someday.

I don't think I'll ever see Carl again. But I saw him. We saw each other. We found each other in the cosmos, and that was wonderful.

— His last wife, Ann Druyan, said

In 2006, Druyan edited Sagan's 1985 Glasgow Gifford Lectures in Natural Theology into a book, The Varieties of Scientific Experience: A Personal View of the Search for God, in which he elaborates on his views of divinity in the natural world.

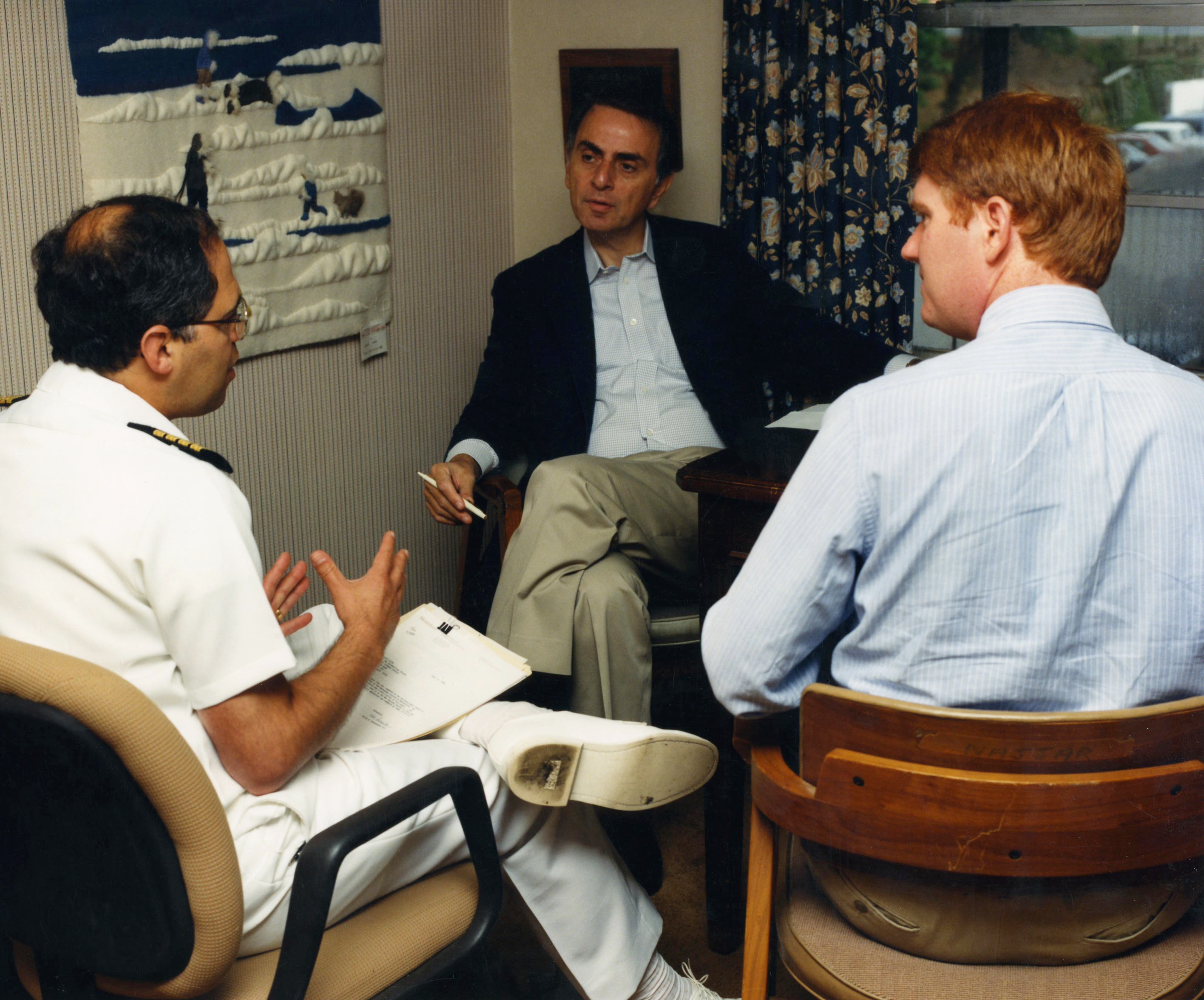
Sagan (center) speaks with CDC employees in 1988

Late in his life, Sagan's books elaborated on his naturalistic view of the world. Billions and Billions: Thoughts on Life and Death at the Brink of the Millennium, published posthumously, contains essays written by him on such topics as his views on abortion; it also contains an essay by Ann Druyan about the relationship between his agnostic and freethinking beliefs and his death.

He wrote of the universality of physical law:

We detect the light from distant quasars only because the laws of electromagnetism are the same ten billion light years away as here. The spectra of those quasars are recognizable only because the same chemical elements are present there as here, and because the same laws of quantum mechanics apply. The motion of galaxies around one another follows familiar Newtonian gravity. Gravitational lenses and binary pulsar spin-downs reveal general relativity in the depths of space. We could have lived in a universe with different laws in every province, but we do not. This fact cannot but elicit feelings of reverence and awe.

He went on: "Why should a few simple laws of Nature explain so much and hold such sway throughout this vast Universe? Isn't this just what you might expect from a Creator of the Universe? Why should some religious people oppose the reductionist program in science, except out of some misplaced love of mysticism?"

=== Marijuana advocacy ===
Sagan was a user and advocate of marijuana. Under the pseudonym "Mr. X", he contributed an essay about smoking cannabis to the 1971 book Marihuana Reconsidered. The essay explained that marijuana use had helped to inspire some of Sagan's works and enhance sensual and intellectual experiences. After Sagan's death, his friend Lester Grinspoon disclosed this information to Sagan's biographer, Keay Davidson. The publishing of the biography Carl Sagan: A Life, in 1999 brought media attention to this aspect of Sagan's life. Not long after his death, his widow Ann Druyan went on to preside over the board of directors of the National Organization for the Reform of Marijuana Laws (NORML), a non-profit organization dedicated to reforming cannabis laws.

=== UFOs ===
In 1947, the year that inaugurated the "flying saucer" craze, the young Sagan suspected the "discs" might be alien spaceships. Sagan's interest in UFO reports prompted him on August 3, 1952, to write a letter to U.S. Secretary of State Dean Acheson to ask how the United States would respond if flying saucers turned out to be extraterrestrial. He later had several conversations on the subject in 1964 with Jacques Vallée. Though quite skeptical of any extraordinary answer to the UFO question, Sagan thought scientists should study the phenomenon, at least because there was widespread public interest in UFO reports.

Stuart Appelle notes that Sagan "wrote frequently on what he perceived as the logical and empirical fallacies regarding UFOs and the abduction experience. Sagan rejected an extraterrestrial explanation for the phenomenon but felt there were both empirical and pedagogical benefits for examining UFO reports and that the subject was, therefore, a legitimate topic of study."

In 1966, Sagan was a member of the Ad Hoc Committee to Review Project Blue Book, the U.S. Air Force's UFO investigation project. The committee concluded Blue Book had been lacking as a scientific study, and recommended a university-based project to give the UFO phenomenon closer scientific scrutiny. The result was the Condon Committee (1966–68), led by physicist Edward Condon, and in their final report they formally concluded that UFOs, regardless of what any of them actually were, did not behave in a manner consistent with a threat to national security.

Sociologist Ron Westrum writes that "The high point of Sagan's treatment of the UFO question was the AAAS' symposium in 1969. A wide range of educated opinions on the subject were offered by participants, including not only proponents such as James McDonald and J. Allen Hynek but also skeptics like astronomers William Hartmann and Donald Menzel. The roster of speakers was balanced, and it is to Sagan's credit that this event was presented in spite of pressure from Edward Condon." With physicist Thornton Page, Sagan edited the lectures and discussions given at the symposium; these were published in 1972 as UFO's: A Scientific Debate. Some of Sagan's many books examine UFOs (as did one episode of Cosmos) and he claimed a religious undercurrent to the phenomenon.

He wrote:

Occasionally, I get a letter from someone who is 'in contact' with extraterrestrials. I am invited to 'ask them anything.' And so, over the years I've prepared a list of questions. These extraterrestrials are very advanced, remember. So I ask things like, 'Please provide a short proof of Fermat's Last Theorem.' Or the Goldbach Conjecture. So then I have to explain what these are, because extraterrestrials will not call it Fermat's Last Theorem. So I write out the simple equations and the exponents. I never get an answer. On the other hand, if I ask something like 'Should we be good?' I almost always get an answer. Anything vague, especially involving conventional moral judgments, these aliens are extremely happy to respond to. But on anything specific, where there is a chance to find out if they actually know anything beyond what most humans know, there is only silence. Something can be deduced from this differential ability to answer questions.

He noted: "It's a stimulating exercise to think of questions to which no human today knows the answers, but where a correct answer would be immediately recognized as such. It's even more challenging to such formulate such questions in fields other than mathematics. Perhaps we should hold a contest and collect the best responses in 'Ten Questions to Ask an Alien.'"

== Death ==
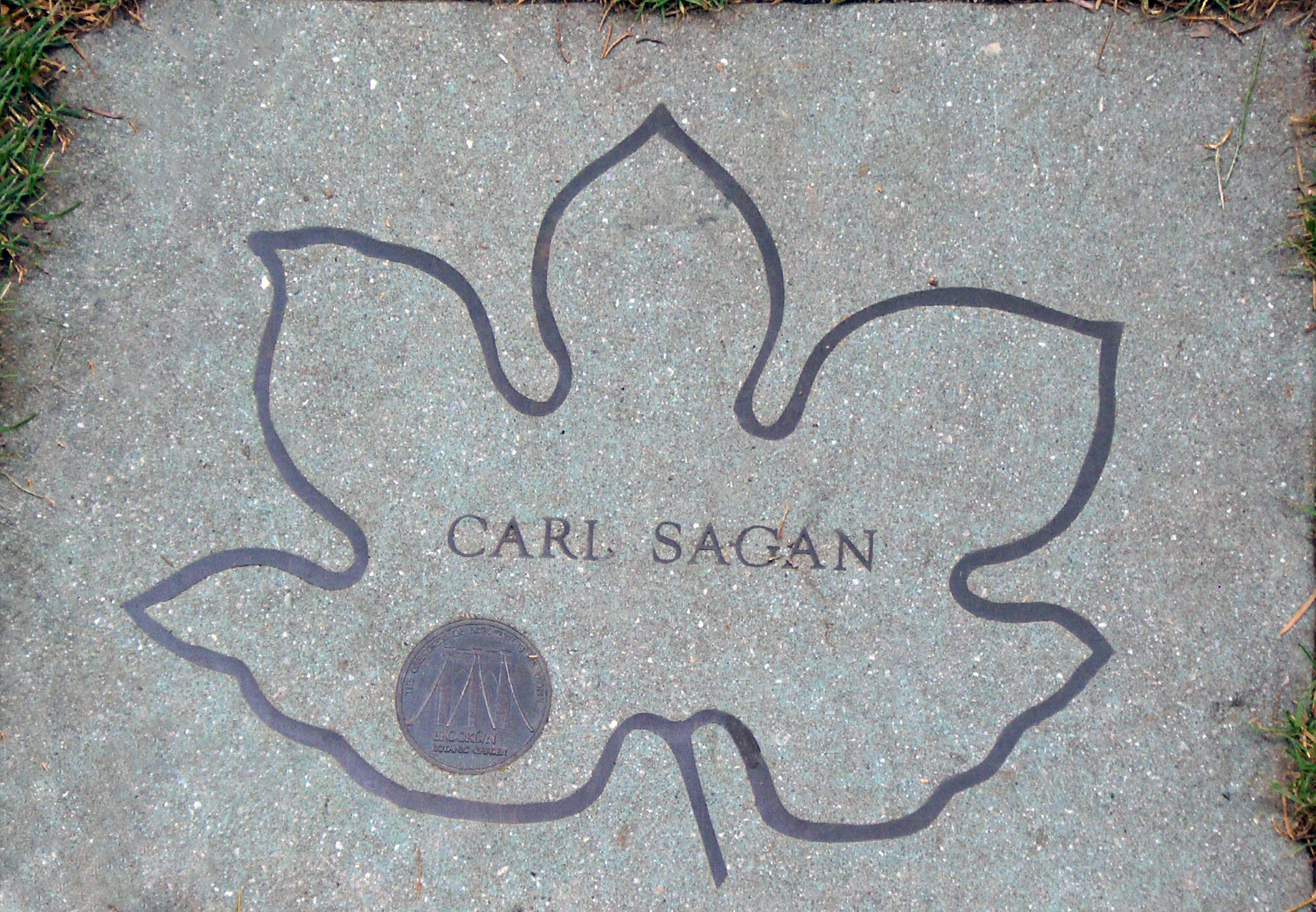
Stone dedicated to Sagan in the Celebrity Path of the Brooklyn Botanic Garden

After suffering from myelodysplasia for two years and receiving three bone marrow transplants from his sister, Sagan died from pneumonia at the age of 62 at the Fred Hutchinson Cancer Research Center in Seattle on December 20, 1996. He was buried at Lake View Cemetery in Ithaca, New York.

== Legacy ==
Sagan has been credited with inspiring a generation of scientists and science popularizers. Simon Singh dedicated Big Bang to "Carl Sagan, James Burke, Magnus Pyke, Heinz Wolff, Patrick Moore, Johnny Ball, Rob Buckman, Miriam Stoppard, Raymond Baxter, and all the science TV producers and directors who inspired my interest in science." Bill Nye took Sagan's astronomy class at Cornell. Sagan tried to get a 17-year-old Neil Degrasse Tyson to attend the University. Tyson recalls of the encounter, "I already knew I wanted to become a scientist. But that afternoon, I learned from Carl the kind of person I wanted to become."

The Sagan Teaching Awards at the University of Chicago are named in his honor.

To mark the tenth anniversary of Sagan's death, David Morrison, a former student of Sagan, recalled "Sagan's immense contributions to planetary research, the public understanding of science, and the skeptical movement" in Skeptical Inquirer.

Discover Magazine named The Cosmic Connection as one of the 25 best science books of all time.

In 2013, Librarian of Congress James H. Billington joined Ann Druyan for the opening of the Carl Sagan Archives. Speakers included Carolyn Porco, Bill Nye and Kip Thorne. In 2014, Druyan and Seth MacFarlane produced Cosmos: A Spacetime Odyssey, hosted by Neil Degrasse Tyson.

He received the Public Welfare Medal, the highest award of the National Academy of Sciences for "distinguished contributions in the application of science to the public welfare." He was denied membership in the academy, reportedly because his media activities made him unpopular with many other scientists.

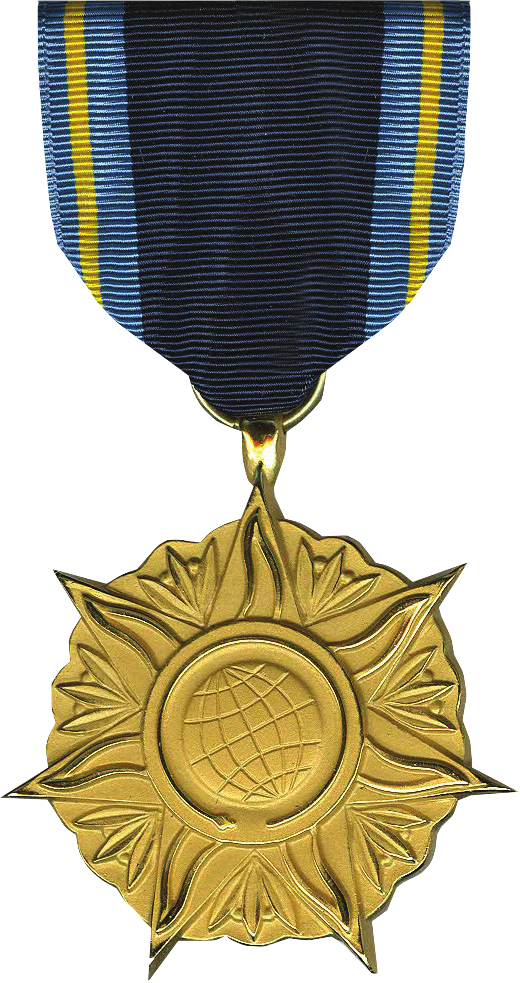
NASA Distinguished Public Service Medal

- Annual Award for Television Excellence—1981—Ohio State University—PBS series Cosmos: A Personal Voyage
- Apollo Achievement Award—National Aeronautics and Space Administration
- NASA Distinguished Public Service Medal—National Aeronautics and Space Administration (1977)
- Emmy—Outstanding Individual Achievement—1981—PBS series Cosmos: A Personal Voyage
- Emmy—Outstanding Informational Series—1981—PBS series Cosmos: A Personal Voyage
- Fellow of the American Physical Society–1989
- Exceptional Scientific Achievement Medal—National Aeronautics and Space Administration
- Helen Caldicott Leadership Award – Awarded by Women's Action for Nuclear Disarmament
- Hugo Award—1981—Best Dramatic Presentation—Cosmos: A Personal Voyage
- Hugo Award—1981—Best Related Non-Fiction Book—Cosmos
- Hugo Award—1998—Best Dramatic Presentation—Contact
- Humanist of the Year—1981—Awarded by the American Humanist Association
- American Philosophical Society—1995—Elected to membership.
- In Praise of Reason Award—1987—Committee for Skeptical Inquiry
- Isaac Asimov Award—1994—Committee for Skeptical Inquiry
- John F. Kennedy Astronautics Award—1982—American Astronautical Society
- Special non-fiction Campbell Memorial Award—1974—The Cosmic Connection: An Extraterrestrial Perspective
- Joseph Priestley Award—"For distinguished contributions to the welfare of mankind"
- Klumpke-Roberts Award of the Astronomical Society of the Pacific—1974
- Golden Plate Award of the American Academy of Achievement—1975
- Konstantin Tsiolkovsky Medal—Awarded by the Soviet Cosmonauts Federation
- Locus Award 1986—Contact
- Los Angeles Times Book Prize's 1996 Science and Technology category for The Demon-Haunted World: Science as a Candle in the Dark.
- Lowell Thomas Award—The Explorers Club—75th Anniversary
- Masursky Award—American Astronomical Society
- Miller Research Fellowship—Miller Institute (1960–1962)
- Oersted Medal—1990—American Association of Physics Teachers
- Peabody Award—1980—PBS series Cosmos: A Personal Voyage
- Le Prix Galabert d'astronautique—International Astronautical Federation (IAF)
- Public Welfare Medal—1994—National Academy of Sciences
- Pulitzer Prize for General Nonfiction—1978—The Dragons of Eden
- Science Fiction Chronicle Award—1998—Dramatic Presentation—Contact
- UCLA Medal–1991
- Inductee to International Space Hall of Fame in 2004
- Named the "99th Greatest American" on June 5, 2005, Greatest American television series on the Discovery Channel
- Named an honorary member of the Demosthenian Literary Society on November 10, 2011
- New Jersey Hall of Fame—2009—Inductee.
- Committee for Skeptical Inquiry (CSI) Pantheon of Skeptics—April 2011—Inductee (Note: CSI was formerly CSICOP, the Committee for the Scientific Investigation of Claims of the Paranormal.)
- Grand-Cross of the Order of Saint James of the Sword, Portugal (November 23, 1998)
- Honorary Doctor of Science (Sc.D.) degree from Whittier College in 1978.
- Was given the 2012 Science Fiction and Fantasy Writers Association's Kate Wilhelm Solstice Award.

=== Posthumous recognition ===
==== Sites named after him ====
In 1993, Sky & Telescope held a contest to replace the name of the Big Bang model. Suggestions included "Hubble Bubble", "Bertha D. Universe" and "SAGAN" ("Scientists Awestruck at God's Awesome Nature".) The panel, including Sagan, Timothy Ferris and Hugh Downs, turned them down.

In 1997, the Sagan Planet Walk was opened in Ithaca, New York. It is a walking-scale model of the Solar System, extending 1.2 km from the center of The Commons in downtown Ithaca to the Sciencenter, a hands-on museum. The exhibition was created in memory of Sagan, who was an Ithaca resident and Cornell Professor. Professor Sagan had been a founding member of the museum's advisory board.

The landing site of the uncrewed Mars Pathfinder spacecraft was renamed the Carl Sagan Memorial Station on July 5, 1997.

Asteroid 2709 Sagan is named in his honor, as is the Carl Sagan Institute for the search of habitable planets.

On November 9, 2001, on what would have been Sagan's 67th birthday, the Ames Research Center dedicated the site for the Carl Sagan Center for the Study of Life in the Cosmos. "Carl was an incredible visionary, and now his legacy can be preserved and advanced by a 21st century research and education laboratory committed to enhancing our understanding of life in the universe and furthering the cause of space exploration for all time", said NASA Administrator Daniel Goldin. Ann Druyan was at the center as it opened its doors on October 22, 2006.

On October 21, 2019, the Carl Sagan and Ann Druyan Theater was opened at the Center for Inquiry West in Los Angeles.

His papers, comprising 595,000 items, are archived in the Library of Congress.

Freeman Dyson: "He saw the cosmic connection as an enlargement of the human spirit. He wanted everyone on Earth, not only the scientific elite, to feel connected with the cosmos.“

==== Awards named after him ====
Sagan has at least three awards named in his honor:

- The Carl Sagan Memorial Award presented jointly since 1997 by the American Astronomical Society and The Planetary Society,
- The Carl Sagan Medal for Excellence in Public Communication in Planetary Science presented since 1998 by the American Astronomical Society's Division for Planetary Sciences (AAS/DPS) for outstanding communication by an active planetary scientist to the general public—Carl Sagan was one of the original organizing committee members of the DPS, and
- The Carl Sagan Award for Public Understanding of Science presented by the Council of Scientific Society presidents (CSSP)—Sagan was the first recipient of the CSSP award in 1993.

==== Awards given to him ====
August 2007 the Independent Investigations Group (IIG) awarded Sagan posthumously a Lifetime Achievement Award. This honor has also been awarded to Harry Houdini and James Randi.

In 2022, Sagan was posthumously awarded the Future of Life Award "for reducing the risk of nuclear war by developing and popularizing the science of nuclear winter." The honor, shared by seven other recipients involved in nuclear winter research, was accepted by his widow, Ann Druyan.

==== In popular culture ====
Robert Zemeckis's Contact was based on Sagan's novel of the same name. The movie was completed after his death. It ends with the dedication "For Carl." His photo can also be seen in the film.

The Beastie Boys paid homage to Sagan on To the 5 Boroughs: "I've got billions and billions of rhymes to flex / 'Cause I've got more rhymes than Carl Sagan's got turtlenecks."

Sagan's son Nick wrote several episodes in the Star Trek franchise. In an episode of Star Trek: Enterprise entitled "Terra Prime", a quick shot is shown of the relic rover Sojourner, part of the Mars Pathfinder mission, placed by a historical marker at Carl Sagan Memorial Station on the Martian surface. The marker displays a quote from Sagan: "Whatever the reason you're on Mars, I'm glad you're there, and I wish I was with you." Sagan's student Steve Squyres led the team that landed the rovers Spirit and Opportunity successfully on Mars in 2004.

In September 2008, musical compositor Benn Jordan released Pale Blue Dot, a tribute to Sagan's life.

Beginning in 2009, a musical project known as Symphony of Science sampled several excerpts of Sagan from his series Cosmos and remixed them to electronic music. To date, the videos have received over 21 million views worldwide on YouTube.

The 2014 Swedish science fiction short film Wanderers uses excerpts of Sagan's narration of his book Pale Blue Dot, played over digitally-created visuals of humanity's possible future expansion into outer space.

In February 2015, the Finnish-based symphonic metal band Nightwish released the song "Sagan" as a non-album bonus track for their single "Élan". The song, written by the band's songwriter/composer/keyboardist Tuomas Holopainen, is an homage to Sagan's the life and work.

In February 2019, the progressive metal band Dream Theater dedicated their song named "Pale Blue Dot" to Sagan. It opens with an audioclip from Nick Sagan saying "Hello from the children of planet Earth."

In 2019, Sagan's daughter Sasha released For Small Creatures Such as We: Rituals for Finding Meaning in our Unlikely World, which depicts life with her parents and her father's death when she was fourteen. Building on a theme in her father's work, Sasha Sagan argues in For Small Creatures Such as We that skepticism does not imply pessimism.

Cosmos was named one of the Books That Shaped America by the Library of Congress. In 2022, the audiobook recording of Sagan's Pale Blue Dot was selected for inclusion in the National Recording Registry for being "culturally, historically, or aesthetically significant."

He is featured in Emer Reynolds's documentary The Farthest, about the Voyager program.

In 2023, a movie Voyagers by Sebastián Lelio was announced with Sagan played by Andrew Garfield and with Daisy Edgar-Jones playing Sagan's third wife, Ann Druyan.

Recordings and archival video of Sagan were used extensively in two 2025 films, Elio and The Life of Chuck.

Druyan tells of a porter who refused to let Sagan pay him for handling baggage. He told Sagan, "You gave me the universe."

== Books ==
- Sagan, Carl (1961). Organic Matter and The Moon. Panel on Extra-Terrestrial Life for the Armed Forces – NRC Committee on Bio-Astronautics, Publication 757. Washington, D.C.: National Academy of Sciences—National Research Council. Bibcode:1961orm..book.....S. LCCN 61-60064.
- Sagan, Carl; Leonard, Jonathan Norton (1966). Planets. Life Science Library. Editors of Life. New York: Time Inc. LCCN 66022436. OCLC 346361.
- ——; Shklovskii, I.S. (1966) [Originally published 1962 as Вселенная, жизнь, разум; Moscow: USSR Academy of Sciences Publisher]. Intelligent Life in the Universe. Authorized translation by Paula Fern. San Francisco: Holden-Day, Inc. LCCN 64018404. OCLC 317314.
- ——; Page, Thornton, eds. (1972). UFO's: A Scientific Debate. Ithaca, NY: Cornell University Press. ISBN 978-0-801-40740-6. LCCN 72004572. OCLC 415373.
- ——, ed. (1973). Communication with Extraterrestrial Intelligence (CETI). Cambridge, MA: MIT Press. ISBN 978-0-262-19106-7. LCCN 73013999. OCLC 700752.
- ——; Bradbury, Ray; Clarke, Arthur C.; et al. (1973). Mars and the Mind of Man (1st ed.). New York: Harper & Row. ISBN 978-0-060-10443-6. LCCN 72009746. OCLC 613541.
- —— (1973). The Cosmic Connection: An Extraterrestrial Perspective. Produced by Jerome Agel (1st ed.). Garden City, NY: Anchor Press. ISBN 978-0-385-00457-2. LCCN 73081117. OCLC 756158.
- —— (1975). Other Worlds. Produced by Jerome Agel. Toronto, NY: Bantam Books. ISBN 978-0-552-66439-4. OCLC 3029556.
- —— (1977). The Dragons of Eden: Speculations on the Evolution of Human Intelligence (1st ed.). New York: Random House. ISBN 978-0-394-41045-6. LCCN 76053472. OCLC 2922889.
- ——; Drake, F. D.; Lomberg, Jon; et al. (1978). Murmurs of Earth: The Voyager Interstellar Record (1st ed.). New York: Random House. Bibcode:1978mevi.book.....S. ISBN 978-0-394-41047-0. LCCN 77005991. OCLC 4037611.
- —— (1979). Broca's Brain: Reflections on the Romance of Science (1st ed.). New York: Random House. ISBN 978-0-394-50169-7. LCCN 78021810. OCLC 4493944.
- —— (1980). Cosmos (1st ed.). New York: Random House. ISBN 978-0-394-50294-6. LCCN 80005286. OCLC 6280573.
- ——; Ehrlich, Paul R.; Kennedy, Donald; et al. (1984). The Cold and the Dark: The World after Nuclear War: The Conference on the Long-Term Worldwide Biological Consequences of Nuclear War. Foreword by Lewis Thomas (1st ed.). New York: W. W. Norton & Company. ISBN 978-0-393-01870-7. LCCN 84006070. OCLC 10697281.
- ——; Druyan, Ann (1985). Comet (1st ed.). New York: Random House. ISBN 978-0-394-54908-8. LCCN 85008308. OCLC 811602694.
- —— (1985). Contact: A Novel. New York: Simon & Schuster. ISBN 978-0-671-43400-7. LCCN 85014645. OCLC 12344811.
- ——; Turco, Richard (1990). A Path Where No Man Thought: Nuclear Winter and the End of the Arms Race (1st ed.). New York: Random House. ISBN 978-0-394-58307-5. LCCN 89043155. OCLC 20217496.
- ——; Druyan, Ann (1992). Shadows of Forgotten Ancestors: A Search for Who We Are (1st ed.). New York: Random House. ISBN 978-0-394-53481-7. LCCN 92050155. OCLC 25675747.
- Sagan, Carl; Thompson, W. Reid; Carlson, Robert; Gurnett, Donald; Hord, Charles (October 23, 1993). "A search for life on Earth from the Galileo spacecraft" (PDF). Nature. 365 (6448): 715–721. Bibcode:1993Natur.365..715S. doi:10.1038/365715a0. PMID 11536539. S2CID 4269717.
- Sagan, Carl; Turco, Richard P. (November 1993). "Nuclear Winter in the Post-Cold War Era" (PDF). Journal of Peace Research. 30 (4): 369–373. doi:10.1177/0022343393030004001. JSTOR 424481. S2CID 109843259. Archived from the original (PDF) on February 15, 2020.
- —— (1994). Pale Blue Dot: A Vision of the Human Future in Space (1st ed.). New York: Random House. ISBN 978-0-679-43841-0. LCCN 94018121. OCLC 30736355.
- —— (1995). The Demon-Haunted World: Science as a Candle in the Dark (1st ed.). New York: Random House. ISBN 978-0-394-53512-8. LCCN 95034076. OCLC 779687822. (Note: errata slip inserted.)
- ——; Druyan, Ann (1997). Billions and Billions: Thoughts on Life and Death at the Brink of the Millennium (1st ed.). New York: Random House. ISBN 978-0-679-41160-4. LCCN 96052730. OCLC 36066119.
- —— (2006) [Edited from 1985 Gifford Lectures, University of Glasgow]. Druyan, Ann (ed.). The Varieties of Scientific Experience: A Personal View of the Search for God. New York: Penguin Press. ISBN 978-1-59420-107-3. LCCN 2006044827. OCLC 69021064.

== See also ==
- List of peace activists
- Neil deGrasse Tyson
