= Timothy Ferris =

American science writer and author

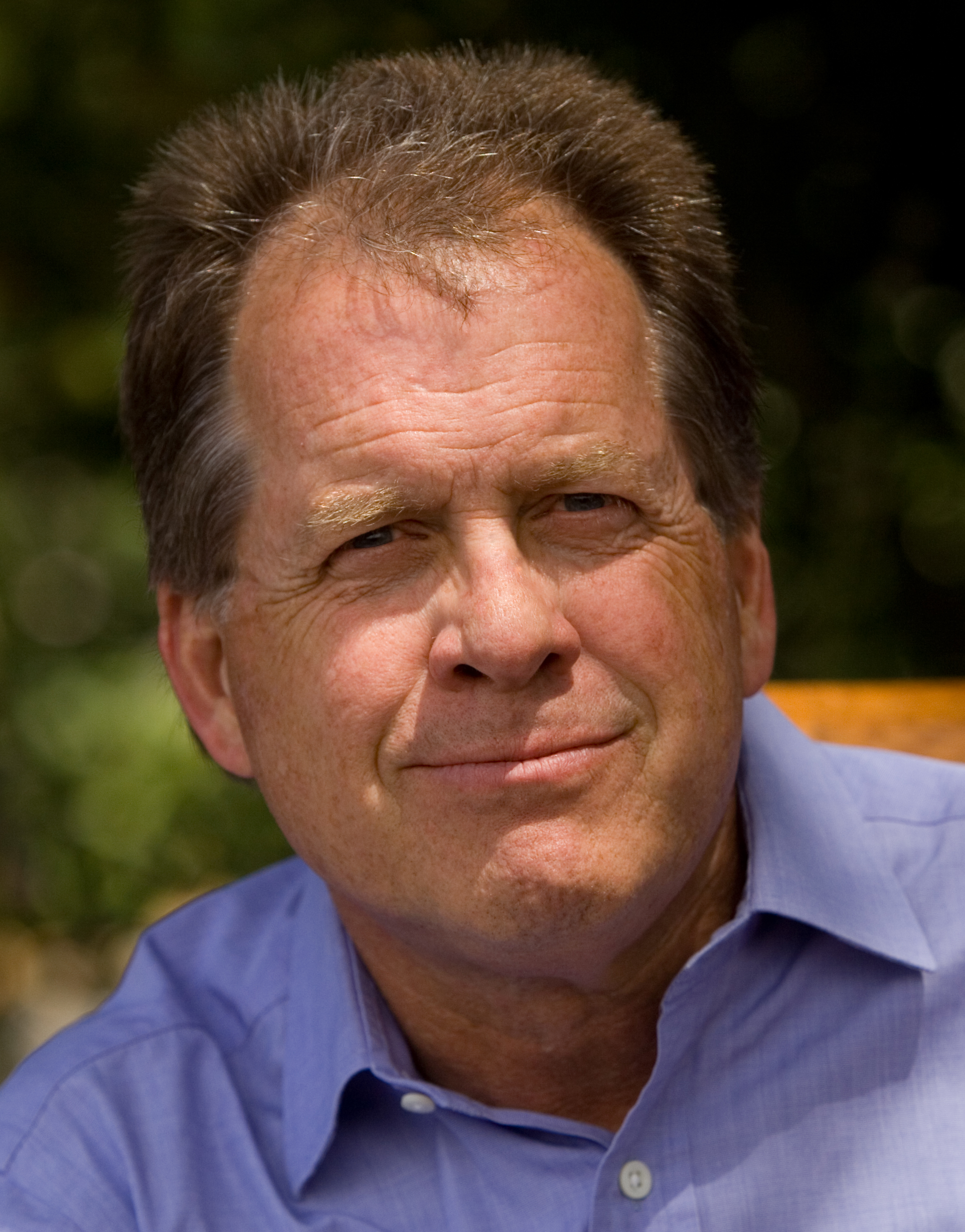
- Ferris in 2009
- Born: August 24, 1944 (age 82)
- Education: Coral Gables Senior High School; Northwestern University; Northwestern University School of Law
- Awards: Klumpke-Roberts Award of the Astronomical Society of the Pacific (1986); American Institute of Physics science-writing medal (× 2); American Association for the Advancement of Science writing prize
- Scientific career
- Fields: Astronomy, astrophysics, cosmology, astrobiology, space science, planetary science
- Website: www.timothyferris.com

Timothy Ferris (born August 29, 1944) is an American science writer. He is best known for Coming of Age in the Milky Way (1988), a history of astronomy which won the Science Writing Award. He also wrote The Whole Shebang: A State-of-the-Universe(s) Report (1997), a popular overview of cosmology. In The Science of Liberty (2010), he argues that scientific thinking played a role in democracy. Ferris has produced three PBS documentaries: The Creation of the Universe (1985), Life Beyond Earth (1999), and Seeing in the Dark (2007). He was a producer of the Voyager Golden Record, a sample of the sights and sounds of Earth sent into space with the Voyager spacecraft.

== Background and education ==
Ferris is a native of Miami, Florida. He is a graduate of Coral Gables Senior High School in Coral Gables, Florida. He attended Northwestern University, graduating in 1966 with majors in English and communications. He studied for one year at the Northwestern University Law School.

== Career ==
After departing Northwestern Law School, Ferris joined United Press International as a reporter, where he worked in New York City.

After starting his career as a newspaper reporter, Ferris became an editor at Rolling Stone. Ferris produced the Voyager Golden Record, an artifact of human civilization containing music, sounds of Earth and encoded photographs launched aboard the Voyager 1 spacecraft. He has served as a consultant to NASA on long-term space exploration policy, and was among the journalists selected as candidates to fly aboard the Space Shuttle in 1986; the planned flight was cancelled due to the Challenger disaster. He was also a friend of and collaborator with American astronomer Carl Sagan.

Ferris has taught astronomy, English, history, journalism, and philosophy at four universities. He is an emeritus professor at the University of California, Berkeley.

He has been a columnist for Smithsonian, Scientific American, and Science Digest magazines and a commentator for National Public Radio, MSNBC, and the PBS News Hour.

== Honors ==
Ferris is a Guggenheim fellow and a Fellow of the American Association for the Advancement of Science (AAAS). He won the Klumpke-Roberts Award of the Astronomical Society of the Pacific in 1986, and has twice won the American Institute of Physics science-writing medal and the American Association for the Advancement of Science writing prize. He was named a CNN "Voice of the Millennium" in 1999. Coming of Age in the Milky Way was named one of the best books of the year by The New York Times. Steven Weinberg included The Whole Shebang on his list of the 13 best popular science books.

== Bibliography ==
- Timothy Ferris (1977). The Red Limit: The Search for the Edge of the Universe. William Morrow & Co. ISBN 978-0-688-03176-3.
- Carl Sagan; Frank D. Drake; Ann Druyan; Timothy Ferris; Jon Lomberg & Linda Salzman Sagan (1978). Murmurs of Earth: The Voyager Interstellar Record. Random House. ISBN 978-0-345-31536-6.
- Timothy Ferris (1980). Galaxies. Sierra Club Books. ISBN 978-0-87156-273-9.
- Timothy Ferris (1984). SpaceShots. Pantheon Books. ISBN 0-394-53890-0.
- Bruce Porter; Timothy Ferris (1988). The Practice of Journalism. Prentice-Hall. ISBN 978-0-13-693706-7.
- Timothy Ferris (1988). Coming of Age in the Milky Way. William Morrow & Co. ISBN 978-0-688-05889-0.
- Timothy Ferris; Clifton Fadiman, eds. (1991). World Treasury of Physics, Astronomy, and Mathematics. Little Brown. ISBN 978-0-316-28129-4.
- Timothy Ferris (1992). The Mind's Sky: Human Intelligence in a Cosmic Context. Bantam Books. ISBN 978-0-553-37133-8.
- Timothy Ferris (1993). The Universe & Eye. Ingram Pinn (illust.). Pavilion Books. ISBN 978-0-517-15572-1.
- Timothy Ferris (1997). The Whole Shebang: A State-of-the-Universe(s) Report. Simon & Schuster. ISBN 978-0-684-83861-8.
- Timothy Ferris (2001). Life Beyond Earth. Simon & Schuster. ISBN 978-0-684-84937-9.
- Timothy Ferris, ed. (2001). Best American Science Writing 2001. HarperCollins. ISBN 0-06-093648-7.
- Timothy Ferris (2002). Seeing in the Dark: How Backyard Stargazers Are Probing Deep into the Universe and Guarding Earth from Interplanetary Peril. Simon & Schuster. ISBN 0-684-86579-3.
- Timothy Ferris (2010). The Science of Liberty: Democracy, Reason, and the Laws of Nature. HarperCollins. ISBN 978-0-06-078150-7.

== Films ==
- Producer, narrator, and writer, Seeing in the Dark, sixty-minute documentary film, PBS premier September 19, 2007; DVD and BR-DVD releases, PBS Home Video, 2008.
- Author and narrator, Life Beyond Earth, two-hour PBS television special, world premier November 10, 1999; DVD release, PBS Home Video, 2000.
- Author and narrator, The Creation of the Universe, ninety-minute television science special; U.S. premier, PBS network, November 20, 1985; also broadcast in the United Kingdom, Japan, Sweden, Norway, Italy, Venezuela, and Brazil. Inaugural release, PBS Home Video, 1991; laserdisc release, Pacific Arts Video, 1992; CD-ROM release, The Voyager Company, 1993; DVD release, PBS Home Video, 2005.
- Writer and narrator, segments on The MacNeil-Lehrer News Hour, PBS television: "Exploding Stars and the Origins of Human Civilization", October 21, 1993; "Pipe Organs and Particle Accelerators", June 8, 1993; "Columbus Day," October 7, 1992; and "The Voyager Encounter With Neptune," August 22, 1989.
- Presenter, segment on American Epic, PBS premier May 30, 2017; also broadcast in the United Kingdom, Germany, France, Australia, Israel, Spain, and Brazil. DVD and BR-DVD releases, PBS Home Video, 2017
- He appeared in The Farthest, a 2017 documentary on the Voyager program.
