= Isabel Hawkins =

American astronomer

Isabel Trecco Hawkins (born 1958) is an Argentine-American astronomer and science educator. Formerly a researcher in the isotopic composition of the interstellar medium and on the cosmic microwave background at the University of California, Berkeley, her interests have shifted to science popularization, as a senior scientist for the Exploratorium in San Francisco.

== Education and career ==
Hawkins was born in 1958 in Córdoba, Argentina. She became interested in astronomy at age 10 through a book provided by a traveling encyclopedia salesman, through sleeping under the stars in summers at a family ranch in San Francisco del Chañar, and through a birthday visit to the Galileo Galilei Planetarium. She first came to the United States as an exchange student in high school, in Los Altos, California, choosing to do so in part because no telescopes were available in Argentina. Returning to the US a year later, she earned a bachelor's degree in physics at the University of California, Riverside, married her American high school sweetheart, and completed a Ph.D. in 1986 at the University of California, Los Angeles. Her dissertation, The carbon twelve to carbon thirteen isotope ratio of the interstellar medium in the neighborhood of the Sun, was supervised by Michael Jura.

After two stints as a postdoctoral researcher, she became a researcher in the Space Sciences Laboratory of the University of California, Berkeley. In the mid-1990s, her interests shifted to science education and she became director of the laboratory's Center for Science Education. She moved to the Exploratorium in 2009. She also provides television content on science for Univision and consults for the Smithsonian Museum and the Museum of Indian Arts and Culture.

== Recognition ==
Hawkins was the 2009 recipient of the Klumpke–Roberts Award of the Astronomical Society of the Pacific.

Minor planet 27120 Isabelhawkins, discovered in 1998, is named for Hawkins.
