= The Farthest =

- Theatrical release poster
- Directed by: Emer Reynolds
- Written by: Emer Reynolds
- Produced by: John Murray; Clare Stronge
- Cinematography: Kate McCullough
- Edited by: Tony Cranstoun
- Music by: Ray Harman
- Production companies: Crossing the Line Productions; HHMI Tangled Bank Studios
- Distributed by: Abramorama
- Release date: 26 February 2017 (Dublin Film Festival)
- Running time: 121 minutes
- Country: Ireland
- Language: English
- Box office: $6,900

The Farthest (The Farthest - Voyager in Space in the United States on PBS) is an Irish documentary film that chronicles the history of the Voyager program and its two space probes, Voyager 1 and Voyager 2, launched in 1977. In 2013, Voyager 1 became the first human-made object to leave the Solar System and reach interstellar space. This makes the program one of humankind's greatest achievements. The story is presented through the testimonies of the NASA team involved. The film premiered on 26 February 2017 at the Dublin Film Festival, where it won the Audience Award, and 22 August 2017 on PBS.

== Cast ==
The cast includes more than 20 of the original and current mission scientists, engineers, team members and NASA employees; among them are Frank Drake, Carolyn Porco, Lawrence Krauss, Timothy Ferris, Edward C. Stone, Nick Sagan, Larry Soderblom, Fran Bagenal and Jon Lomberg.

== Reception ==
On review aggregator website Rotten Tomatoes, the film has a 100% approval rating based on 27 critical reviews, with the consensus stating, "Informative, enthusiastic and accessible, The Farthest will inspire even the most grounded of viewers to look up in wonder once in a while."

Donald Clarke of The Irish Times awarded the film four stars out of five, calling it "A wonderful film that will inform generations to come." Leslie Felperin of The Guardian also gave the film four stars out of five, stating, "his exquisite, exemplary science documentary, directed by Irish editor turned helmer Emer Reynolds, recounts the rich and fascinating story of the Voyager mission, arguably Nasa’s finest, noblest contribution to scientific understanding." Frank Scheck of The Hollywood Reporter commented, "The Farthest ultimately proves a welcome and invaluable reminder, in these budget-challenged times, that space exploration is of boundless importance."

Nick Schager of Variety wrote, "It’s rare for a film to make one swell with pride about something he or she had no direct hand in, but “The Farthest” accomplishes that feat with aplomb." Noel Murray of the Los Angeles Times observed, "Reynolds takes a thorough and direct approach to the Voyager story, weaving together insightful and unexpectedly poetic interviews with several of the people who worked on the project, illustrated with a mix of archival footage and artfully shot re-creations." Richard A. Marini of San Antonio Express News called the film "Fascinating and inspiring."
