= The Demon-Haunted World =

1995 book by Carl Sagan

The Demon-Haunted World: Science as a Candle in the Dark
- Cover of the first edition
- Author: Carl Sagan
- Language: English
- Subjects: Scientific skepticism Science; Philosophy
- Publisher: Random House
- Publication date: 1995/1997
- Publication place: United States
- Media type: Print (hardcover and paperback)
- Pages: 457
- ISBN: 0-345-40946-9
- OCLC: 32855551
- Dewey Decimal: 001.9 20
- LC Class: Q175 .S215 1995
- Preceded by: Pale Blue Dot
- Followed by: Billions and Billions

The Demon-Haunted World: Science as a Candle in the Dark is a 1995 book by the astronomer and science communicator Carl Sagan. (Four of the 25 chapters were written with Ann Druyan.) In it, Sagan aims to explain the scientific method to laypeople and to encourage people to learn critical and skeptical thinking. He explains methods to help distinguish between ideas that are considered valid science and those that can be considered pseudoscience. Sagan states that when new ideas are offered for consideration, they should be tested by means of skeptical thinking and should stand up to rigorous questioning.

== Themes ==
Sagan explains that science is not just a body of knowledge, but is a way of thinking. Sagan shows how scientific thinking is both imaginative and disciplined, bringing humans to an understanding of how the universe is, rather than how they wish to perceive it. He says that science works much better than any other system because it has a "built-in error-correcting machine". Superstition and pseudoscience get in the way of the ability of many laypersons to appreciate the beauty and benefits of science. Skeptical thinking allows people to construct, understand, reason, and recognize valid and invalid arguments. Wherever possible, there must be independent validation of the concepts whose truth should be proved. He states that reason and logic would succeed once the truth was known. Conclusions emerge from premises, and the acceptability of the premises should not be discounted or accepted because of bias.

=== Dragon in my garage ===
As an example of skeptical thinking, Sagan offers a story concerning a fire-breathing dragon who lives in his garage. When he persuades a rational, open-minded visitor to meet the dragon, the visitor remarks that they are unable to see the creature. Sagan replies that he "neglected to mention that she's an invisible dragon". The visitor suggests spreading flour on the floor so that the creature's footprints might be seen, which Sagan says is a good idea, "but this dragon floats in the air". When the visitor considers using an infrared camera to view the creature's invisible fire, Sagan explains that her fire is heatless. He continues to counter every proposed physical test with a reason why the test will not work.

Sagan concludes by asking: "Now what's the difference between an invisible, incorporeal, floating dragon who spits heatless fire and no dragon at all? If there's no way to disprove my contention, no conceivable experiment that would count against it, what does it mean to say that my dragon exists? Your inability to invalidate my hypothesis is not at all the same thing as proving it true."

Continuing with concepts relevant to the 'dragon in my garage' story, Sagan writes about a patient of John Mack who claimed to have scars on her body which were from encounters with aliens. Sagan writes that if the patient is asked what her scars look like, she is unable to show them because, unfortunately, they are located in the private areas of her body.

=== Baloney detection kit ===
Sagan presents a set of tools for skeptical thinking that he calls the "baloney detection kit". Skeptical thinking consists both of constructing a reasoned argument and recognizing a fallacious or fraudulent one. In order to identify a fallacious argument, Sagan suggests employing such tools as independent confirmation of facts, debate, development of different hypotheses, quantification, the use of Occam's razor, and the possibility of falsification. Sagan's "baloney detection kit" also provides tools for detecting "the most common fallacies of logic and rhetoric", such as argument from authority and statistics of small numbers. Through these tools, Sagan argues the benefits of a critical mind and the self-correcting nature of science can take place.

Sagan provides nine tools as the first part of this kit.

1. There must be independent confirmation of the facts given when possible.
2. Encourage debate on the evidence from all points of view.
3. Realize that an argument from authority is not always reliable. Sagan supports this by telling us that "authorities" have made mistakes in the past and they will again in the future.
4. Consider more than one hypothesis. Sagan adds to this by telling us that we must think of the argument from all angles and think all the ways it can be explained or disproved. The hypothesis that then still hasn't been disproved has a much higher chance of being correct.
5. Try to avoid clinging obdurately to your own hypothesis and so become biased. Sagan tells us to compare our own hypothesis with others to see if we can find reasons to reject our own hypothesis.
6. Quantify. Sagan tells us that if whatever we are trying to explain has numerical value or quantitative data related to it, then we'll be much more able to compete against other hypotheses.
7. If there is a chain of argument, every link in that chain must be correct.
8. The use of Occam's razor, which says to choose the hypothesis that is simpler and requires the fewest assumptions.
9. Ask if a given hypothesis can be falsified. Sagan tells us that if a hypothesis cannot be tested or falsified then it is not worth considering.

Sagan suggests that with the use of this "baloney detection kit" it is easier to critically think and find the truth.

==== Logical fallacies ====
There is a second part to the kit. This consists of twenty logical fallacies that one must not commit when offering up a new claim.

1. Ad hominem. An arguer attacks the opposing arguer and not the actual argument.
2. Argument from authority. Someone expects another to immediately believe that a person of authority or higher knowledge is correct.
3. Argument from adverse consequences. Someone says that something must be done a certain way or else there will be adverse consequences.
4. Appeal to ignorance. One argues a claim in that whatever has not been proved false must be true, and vice versa.
5. Special pleading. An arguer responds to a deeply complex or rhetorical question or statement by, usually, saying "oh you don't understand how so and so works."
6. Begging the question. An arguer assumes the answer and makes a claim such as, this happened because of that, or, this needs to happen in order for that to happen.
7. Observational selection. Someone talks about how great something is by explaining all of the positive aspects of it while purposely not mentioning any of the negative aspects.
8. Statistics of small numbers. Someone argues something by giving the statistics in small numbers, which isn't very reliable.
9. Misunderstanding of the nature of statistics. Someone misinterprets statistics given to them.
10. Fallacy of inconsistency. An arguer is very inconsistent in their claims.
11. Non sequitur. This is Latin for "it doesn't follow". A claim is made that doesn't make much sense, such as "Our nation will prevail because God is great."
12. Post hoc ergo propter hoc. Latin for "it happened after, so it was caused by". An arguer claims that something happened because of a past event when really it probably didn't.
13. Meaningless question. Someone asks a question that has no real meaning or doesn't add to the argument at all.
14. The excluded middle. An arguer only considers or mentions the two opposite extremes of the conversation and excludes the aspects in between the two extremes.
15. Short-term vs. long-term. A subset of the excluded middle, but so important it was pulled out for special attention.
16. Slippery slope, related to excluded middle (e.g., If we allow abortion in the first weeks of pregnancy, it will be impossible to prevent the killing of a full-term infant. Or, conversely: If the state prohibits…).
17. Confusion of correlation and causation. The latter causes the former.
18. Straw man. Caricaturing a position to make it easier to attack. This is also a short-term/long-term fallacy.
19. Suppressed evidence, or half-truth.
20. Weasel word. Talleyrand said: "An important art of politicians is to find new names for institutions which under old names have become odious to the public."

Sagan provides a skeptical analysis of several examples of what he refers to as superstition, fraud, and pseudoscience such as witches, UFOs, ESP, and faith healing. He is critical of organized religion.

In a 2020 interview for Skeptical Inquirer, when Sagan's wife Ann Druyan was asked about the origin of the phrase "baloney detection kit", she said that

It didn't really come from Carl. It actually came from a friend of mine named Arthur Felberbaum who died about forty years ago. He and Carl and I once sat down for dinner together. His politics were very left wing, so Carl and Arthur and I were trying to find common ground so that we could have a really good dinner together. And at one point, Arthur said, "Carl, it's just that I dream that every one of us would have a baloney detection kit in our head." And that's where that idea came from.

=== Misuse of science ===
Sagan indicates that science can be misused. Thus, he is highly critical of Edward Teller, the "father of the hydrogen bomb", and Teller's influence on politics, and contrasts his stance to that of Linus Pauling and other scientists who took moral positions.

Sagan also discusses the misuse of science in representation. He relates to the depiction of the mad scientist character in children's TV shows and is critical of this occurrence. Sagan suggests an addition of scientific television programs, many of which would take a look at believed hoaxes of the past and encourage viewers to engage in critical thinking to better represent science on popular television.

==== Misuse of psychiatric authority ====
Sagan indicates that therapists can contribute to the growth of pseudoscience or the infusion of "false stories". He is critical of John Mack and his support of alien abduction cases, which were represented in his patients.

Sagan writes about the story of Paul Ingram. Ingram's daughter reported that her father had sexually abused her. He was told that "sex offenders often repressed memories of their crimes." Ingram was eventually able to have a foggy visualization of the claimed events, and he suggested that perhaps "a demon might be responsible." Sagan describes how once Ingram started remembering events, so did several other individuals and family members. A "memory recovery" technique was performed on Ingram, and he confessed to the crimes. A medical examination was done on his daughter, where none of the scars she described were actually found. Sagan writes that Ingram later tried to plead innocence once "away from his daughters, his police colleagues, and his pastor."

==== Hoaxes ====
Hoaxes have played a valuable role in the history of science by revealing the flaws in our thinking and helping us advance our critical thinking skills. One of Sagan's examples is the "Carlos hoax" by James Randi that revealed flaws in reporting by news media. Carlos was described as an ancient spirit that supposedly possessed José Alvarez and provided Alvarez with advanced knowledge about the universe. Many news outlets assumed this was true and reported it as such, which spread misinformation.

Sagan also cites crop circles as hoaxes.

== Reception and legacy ==
The book was a New York Times bestseller. The contemporary skeptical movement considers it an important book. The Demon-Haunted World has been criticized (in Smithsonian magazine and The New York Times) for not incorporating certain information relevant to the items he discusses in his book. The Smithsonian article by Paul Trachtman argues that Sagan relates issues of government choices and declining scientific thinking skills to pseudoscience topics like astrology and faith healing but ignores other issues that may be causing governmental bodies and other individuals to turn away from science. One such issue is consequences of pouring governmental money into cancer research. Trachtman writes, "it is not because of such beliefs that Congress now approaches the NIH budget with an ax. In fact, billions of dollars spent on years of research in the war on cancer have spawned growing professional bureaucracies and diminishing medical benefits." Trachtman argues that Sagan does not include problems like growing bureaucracies and diminishing medical benefits as reasons for a lack of scientific attention. In his review for The New York Times, James Gorman also argues for an unaddressed issue in Sagan's book, saying Sagan fails to emphasize the idea that scientists should take a more active role in teaching science to the public, while he does mention the failures of the education system to do so.

The review in the Smithsonian magazine and a review by academic biologist Richard Lewontin in the New York Review of Books provide a range of opinions on Sagan's attitude towards religious ideas. Per the New York Review article, "when it comes to the Supreme Extraterrestrial he is rather circumspect." The Smithsonian article suggests Sagan was very clear about his religious beliefs in the book, for he "splits his universe in two, into science and irrationality." The Smithsonian goes on to say that Sagan's defined religious views fall within the area of an untestable claim, a type of claim he argues against in The Demon-Haunted World.

Lewontin's review also claims that Sagan includes something in The Demon-Haunted World which he also is arguing against in that same text. The article mentions how Sagan discusses a natural predisposition people have towards science, but, the article says, "He does not tell us how he used the scientific method to discover the "embedded" human proclivity for science." Sagan heavily discusses the importance of using the scientific method in his book, and this article claims he strays away from his own message by not including a description of his use of the scientific method on this topic.

A review by Lee Dembart in the Los Angeles Times was positive. It described Sagan's book as "a manifesto for clear thought", with the main issue being the length of eight chapters. Gorman's review in The New York Times also criticized the length of the book.

The book has received a number of retrospective reviews. An article in The Guardian, 2012, described the book as somewhat dated, though still insightful. Another article from The Verge in 2017 noted that a quote from the book regarding Sagan's pessimistic prediction for a future America had gone viral on Twitter, which the article described as "chillingly prescient". The article praised the book, stating that Sagan "practiced the scientific skepticism and thinking that he preached, and that's what helped him accurately analyze the trends of his time and forecast their eventual outcomes in ours."

== See also ==
- Extraordinary Popular Delusions and the Madness of Crowds – 1841 book by Charles Mackay
- Junk science – Scientific data considered to be spurious or fraudulent
- Pathological science – Area of research which persists despite being widely discredited
- Rationalism – Epistemological view centered on reason
