= Klumpke-Roberts Award =

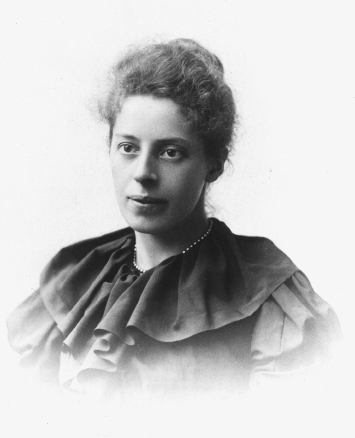
Dorothea Klumpke-Roberts

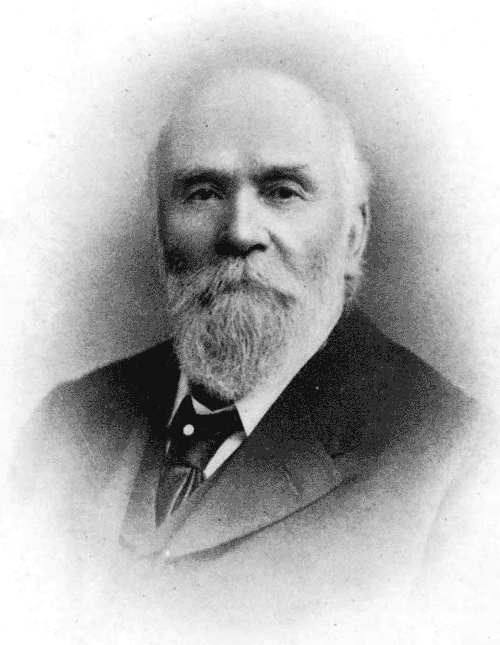
Isaac Roberts

The Klumpke-Roberts Award, one of seven international and national awards for service to astronomy and astronomy education given by the Astronomical Society of the Pacific, was established from a bequest by astronomer Dorothea Klumpke-Roberts to honor her husband Isaac Roberts and her parents.

It recognizes outstanding contributions to the public understanding and appreciation of astronomy. It is open to "individuals involved in science, education, writing/publishing, broadcasting, astronomy popularization, the arts, or other pursuits" from all nations and is the most prestigious award of its kind.

== Award winners ==
Source: Astronomical Society of the Pacific

- 1974 Carl Sagan
- 1975 Isaac Asimov
- 1976 Chesley Bonestell
- 1977 Fred Hoyle
- 1978 Patrick Moore
- 1979 William J. Kaufmann III
- 1980 Walter Sullivan
- 1981 Dietrick Thomsen
- 1982 Bart Bok
- 1983 Helen Sawyer Hogg
- 1984 Deborah Byrd
- 1985 James Stokley
- 1986 Timothy Ferris
- 1987 The Editors of Sky and Telescope Magazine
- 1988 Joseph M. Chamberlain
- 1989 Ed Krupp
- 1990 Donald Goldsmith
- 1991 Richard Berry
- 1992 Philip Morrison
- 1993 David Morrison
- 1994 Andrew Fraknoi
- 1995 Heidi Hammel
- 1996 Terence Dickinson
- 1997 Franklyn M. Branley
- 1998 Julieta Fierro
- 1999 Stephen P. Maran
- 2000 Jack Horkheimer
- 2001 Sandi Preston
- 2002 Don Davis and Jon Lomberg
- 2003 Hubble Heritage Project, Space Telescope Science Institute
- 2004 Seth Shostak
- 2005 Jeff Goldstein
- 2006 Jeffrey Rosendhal
- 2007 Noreen Grice
- 2008 Dava Sobel
- 2009 Isabel Hawkins
- 2010 Marcia Bartusiak
- 2011 Paul Davies
- 2012 Ian Ridpath
- 2013 Mary Kay Hemenway
- 2014 Dennis Schatz
- 2015 Robert J. Nemiroff, Michigan Technological University and Jerry Bonnell, University of Maryland
- 2016 Chris Impey, University of Arizona College of Science
- 2017 Paul A. Delaney, York University
- 2019 Jay Pasachoff, Williams College
- 2021 Lars Lindberg Christensen
- 2022 Suzanne Gurton
- 2023 Don McCarthy
- 2024 Richard Tresch Fienberg

== See also ==
- List of astronomy awards
