= The Cosmic Connection =

1973 book by Carl Sagan

- Cover of the first edition
- Author: Carl Sagan
- Language: English
- Subject: Extraterrestrial intelligence
- Publication date: 1973
- Publication place: United States
- Media type: Print (Hardcover, Paperback)
- Pages: 274 (1973 Book Club Edition); 336 (2000 2nd edition)
- ISBN: 978-0385004572

The Cosmic Connection: An Extraterrestrial Perspective is a book by the astronomer Carl Sagan, produced by Jerome Agel. It was originally published in 1973; an expanded edition with contributions from Freeman Dyson, David Morrison, and Ann Druyan was published in 2000 under the title Carl Sagan's Cosmic Connection. The book contains artwork by Jon Lomberg and other artists. The book was listed as number thirteen in a list of the "25 Greatest Science Books of All Time" by Discover Magazine in 2006.

== Summary ==
Sagan covers several topics, and focuses mainly on the possibility of extraterrestrial intelligence, the likelihood of the existence of more advanced civilizations, and their distribution in the local galaxy, and in the universe. He describes the hypothetical opinions of more advanced intelligences and their views of the Earth, as well as communication with mankind. He also discusses the popularity of UFO sightings and attempts mathematically to portray the probability of such events. Sagan also discusses his view of astrology as a pseudoscience.
