= The Varieties of Scientific Experience =

2006 book by Carl Sagan

The Varieties of Scientific Experience: A Personal View of the Search for God
- Cover
- Author: Carl Sagan
- Language: English
- Subject: Relationship between religion and science
- Publisher: The Penguin Press HC
- Publication date: November 2, 2006
- Publication place: United States
- Media type: Print (hardcover and paperback)
- Pages: 304
- ISBN: 1-59420-107-2

The Varieties of Scientific Experience: A Personal View of the Search for God is a book collecting transcribed talks on the subject of natural theology that astronomer Carl Sagan delivered in 1985 at the University of Glasgow as part of the Gifford Lectures. The book was first published posthumously in 2006, 10 years after his death. The title is a reference to The Varieties of Religious Experience by William James.

The book was edited by Ann Druyan, who also provided an introduction section. The sixth chapter, "The God Hypothesis", was later reprinted in Christopher Hitchens' anthology The Portable Atheist.
