= Contact (novel) =

1985 novel by Carl Sagan

- Cover of the first edition
- Author: Carl Sagan
- Language: English
- Genre: Science fiction
- Publisher: Simon and Schuster
- Publication date: September 1985
- Publication place: United States
- Media type: Print (Hardcover, Paperback)
- Pages: 432
- ISBN: 0-671-43400-4
- OCLC: 12344811
- Dewey Decimal: 813/.54 19
- LC Class: PS3569.A287 C6 1985

Contact is a 1985 hard science fiction novel by American scientist Carl Sagan. The plot concerns contact between humanity and a more technologically advanced extraterrestrial life form.

Contact ranked number seven on Publishers Weekly's 1985 bestseller list. The only full work of fiction published by Sagan, the novel originated as a screenplay by Sagan and Ann Druyan (whom he later married) in 1979; when development of the film stalled, Sagan converted it into a novel. It was adapted in 1997 as the film Contact, starring Jodie Foster.

== Plot ==
As a child, Eleanor "Ellie" Arroway shows a strong aptitude for science and mathematics. Dissatisfied with a school lesson, she confirms in a library that pi is transcendental. When Ellie is in sixth grade, her father, Theodore ("Ted"), dies. Her new stepfather, John Staughton, does not support her interests. Ellie resents him and believes her mother remarried out of weakness.

After graduating from Harvard, Ellie earns a doctorate from Caltech under radio astronomer David Drumlin. She becomes director of "Project Argus," a New Mexico radio telescope array searching for extraterrestrial intelligence (SETI). This puts her at odds with much of the scientific community, including Drumlin, who pushes to defund SETI. Eventually, the project detects a signal from Vega transmitting prime numbers. Further analysis reveals a retransmission of Adolf Hitler's 1936 Olympic speech, the first TV signal to escape Earth's ionosphere.

President Helen Lasker meets with Ellie to discuss first contact. Ellie begins a relationship with Presidential Science Advisor Ken der Heer. With Soviet colleague Vaygay Lunacharsky, she ensures continuous monitoring of the signal. A third message contains plans for an advanced machine, but decoding its 30,000 pages proves impossible without a missing primer.

At the President's insistence, Ellie meets religious leaders Billy Jo Rankin and Palmer Joss. A skeptic, she demonstrates her trust in science by standing at a precise point in front of a Foucault pendulum. Dismissing Rankin's views, she finds Joss's perspective intriguing. In Paris, experts confirm the Machine is a five-seat dodecahedron. There, Ellie meets Devi Sukhavati, a doctor who lost her husband after leaving India for love. The final message piece is found when billionaire S. R. Hadden suggests checking for phase modulation, revealing the primer.

A U.S.–Soviet race to build the Machine ensues, but Soviet design flaws leave the American version as the only option. Ellie applies as a passenger but loses her spot to Drumlin. Extremists plant a bomb in the Wyoming facility, which detonates during testing, killing Drumlin and delaying the project indefinitely. Meanwhile, Ellie's mother suffers a stroke, leaving her paralyzed. Staughton accuses Ellie of neglecting her family.

Ellie later learns Hadden has moved to a private space station. There, he reveals his company has secretly built a third Machine in Hokkaido, Japan, set for launch on December 31, 1999. Ellie, Vaygay, and Devi secure seats, joined by Nigerian physicist Abonnema Eda and Chinese archaeologist Xi Qiaomu. Before departure, Joss gives Ellie a medallion, which she takes aboard.

The activated Machine transports the group through wormholes to a station near the Milky Way's center, where each meets an extraterrestrial in the form of a loved one. Ellie's visitor, appearing as Ted, explains their species' motives and a project to alter the universe's properties using mass in Cygnus A. The wormhole network was built by unknown precursors, and hidden messages exist in transcendental numbers like pi. Reunited, the travelers record evidence before the dodecahedron returns them to Earth.

Back home, their journey—seeming more than a day—took no time at all on Earth. Their video recordings are erased, likely by wormhole magnetic fields. With Hadden seemingly dead and the transmission halted, officials suspect a hoax. Pressured, the travelers stay silent, though Joss believes Ellie. Hadden faked his death, secretly launching himself into space using cryogenics, but this remains unknown to the characters.

Following "Ted's" suggestion, Ellie runs a program computing pi to unprecedented lengths. Before results emerge, her mother dies, leaving a final letter revealing Staughton—not Ted—is Ellie's biological father. When Ellie examines the program's output, she finds a circle formed from 0s and 1s after 10^{20} digits in pi's base-11 representation—evidence of her journey.

== Publication history ==
Reading science fiction and fantasy as a child inspired Sagan to become an astronomer. As an adult, he preferred realistic stories that helped readers understand real science and history, like Robert Heinlein's "—And He Built a Crooked House—" and L. Sprague de Camp's Lest Darkness Fall. In 1978, Sagan predicted that because of science fiction, "I know many young people who would, of course, be interested, but in no way astounded, were we to receive a message tomorrow from an extraterrestrial civilization". In 1981, Simon & Schuster gave Sagan a $2 million advance on the novel. At the time, "the advance was the largest ever made for a book that had not yet been written." The first printing was 265,000 copies. In the first two years it sold 1,700,000 copies. It was a main selection of Book-of-the-Month-Club.

Sagan's friend, physicist Kip Thorne, gave Sagan ideas on the nature of wormholes when Sagan was developing the outline of the novel.

Sagan named the novel's protagonist, Eleanor Arroway, after two people: Eleanor Roosevelt, a "personal hero" of Sagan's wife, Ann Druyan, and Voltaire, whose last name was Arouet. The character is based on the real-life SETI researcher Jill Tarter.

In 1986, the novel won the Locus Award for Best First Novel, and placed #15 in the poll for the Locus Award for Best Science Fiction Novel.

== See also ==
- Communication with extraterrestrial intelligence
- Fermi paradox
- His Master's Voice
- The Listeners

== Sources ==
- Davidson, Keay. Carl Sagan: A Life. New York: John Wiley & Sons, 1999.
- Sagan, Carl. Contact. New York: Simon and Schuster, 1985.
- Spence, Jennifer. "20th-Century American Bestsellers: Contact". LIS 590AB/ENGL 564: 20th-Century American Bestsellers (Spring 2006). Graduate School of Library and Information Science, University of Illinois, Urbana-Champaign. Archived from the original on July 19, 2011.
