= Linda Salzman Sagan =

American artist and writer (1940–2023)

Linda Sagan
- Born: Linda Salzman; 16 July 1940
- Died: 22 November 2023 (aged 83); Ithaca, New York, United States
- Spouse: Carl Sagan (m. 1968; div. 1981)
- Children: Nick Sagan

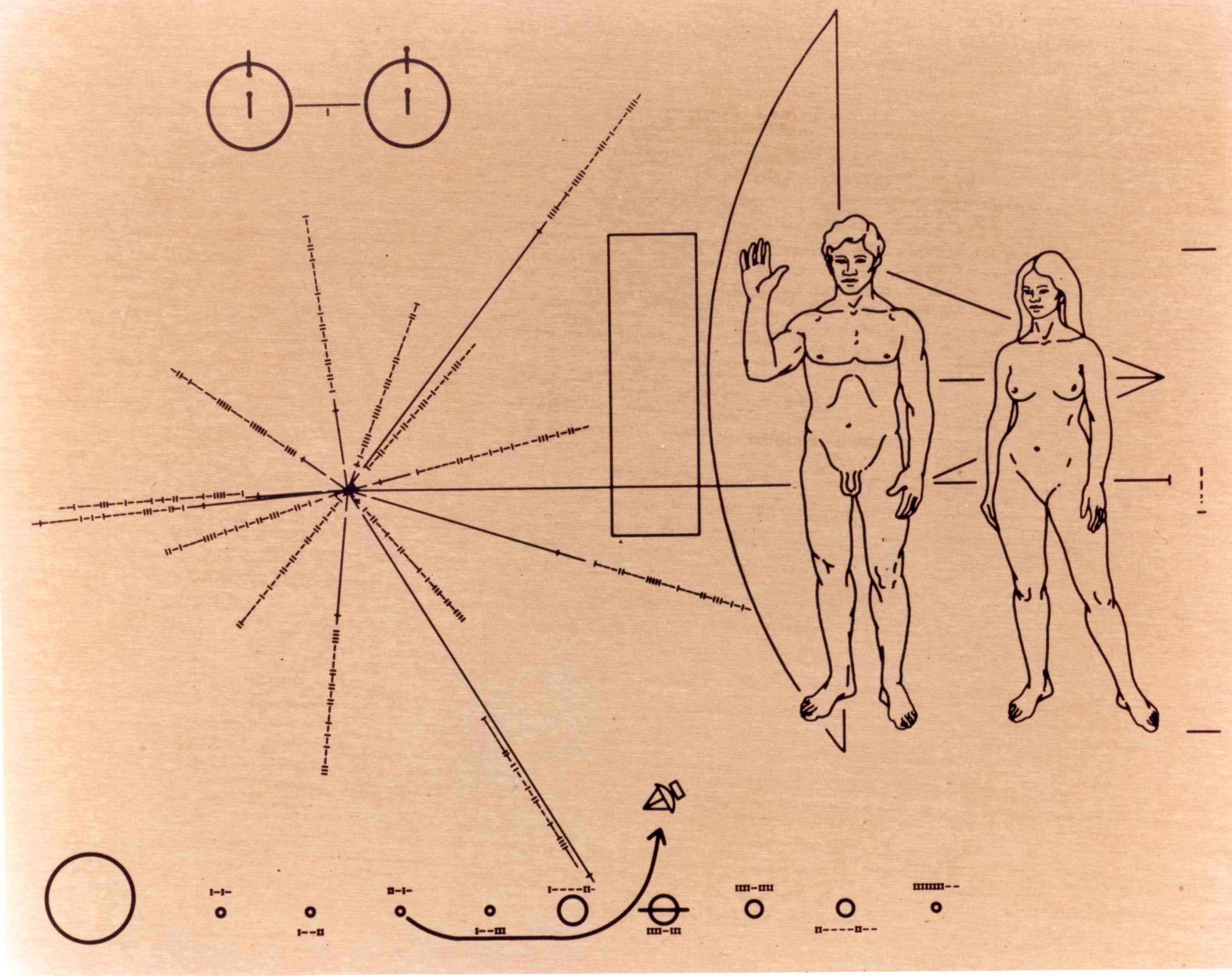
Salzman's illustration on the Pioneer plaque. This image is NASA's censored version of Salzman's original illustration, which included the female external genitalia.

Linda Salzman (July 16, 1940 – November 22, 2023) was an American artist and writer.

== Biography ==
Salzman Sagan created the artwork for the plaque on the Pioneer spacecraft and coproduced the Voyager Golden Record.

Salzman Sagan co-authored the book Murmurs of Earth with her husband, astronomer Carl Sagan, whom she married on April 6, 1968; the marriage lasted until their divorce in 1981.

Salzman Sagan was the mother of author and screenwriter Nick Sagan.

Linda Salzman Sagan died in Ithaca, New York, on November 22, 2023, at the age of 83.

== See also ==
- NASA Ames Research Center
