= 66th Primetime Creative Arts Emmy Awards =

2014 American television programming awards

- Date: August 16, 2014
- Location: Nokia Theatre; Los Angeles, California
- Presented by: Academy of Television Arts & Sciences
- Most awards: Saturday Night Live (5)

Television/radio coverage
- Network: FXM

The 66th Annual Primetime Creative Arts Emmy Awards ceremony was held on August 16, 2014, at the Nokia Theatre in Downtown Los Angeles. The ceremony is in conjunction with the annual Primetime Emmy Awards and is presented in recognition of technical and other similar achievements in American television programming, including guest acting roles.

The Academy of Television Arts & Sciences announced that it will implement online voting for its members to select the nominees. Winners for this year were voted on via paper ballots; online voting to determine the winners will not be used until 2015.

The nominees were announced on July 10, 2014. The Governor's Award and juried award winners in Animation and Costumes for a Variety Series were announced on July 31, 2014. Six Interactive Media juried awards were announced on August 13, 2014.

== Winners and nominees ==
Winners are listed first and highlighted in bold:

=== Governor's Award ===
- **Marion Dougherty (posthumous)**

=== Programs ===
Programs
**Outstanding Structured Reality Program**: **Shark Tank (ABC)**; Antiques Roadshow (PBS); Diners, Drive-Ins and Dives (Food Network); MythBusters (Discovery Channel); Undercover Boss (CBS); Who Do You Think You Are? (TLC)	**Outstanding Unstructured Reality Program**: **Deadliest Catch (Discovery Channel)**; Alaska: The Last Frontier (Discovery Channel); Flipping Out (Bravo); Million Dollar Listing New York (Bravo); Wahlburgers (A&E); Wild Things with Dominic Monaghan (BBC America)
**Outstanding Variety Special**: **AFI Life Achievement Award: A Tribute to Mel Brooks (TNT)**; The Beatles: The Night That Changed America (CBS); Best of Late Night with Jimmy Fallon Primetime Special (NBC); Billy Crystal: 700 Sundays (HBO); The Kennedy Center Honors (CBS); Sarah Silverman: We Are Miracles (HBO)	**Outstanding Informational Series or Special**: **Anthony Bourdain: Parts Unknown (CNN)**; **Vice (HBO)**; Inside the Actors Studio (Bravo); Through the Wormhole (Science); The Writers' Room (SundanceTV)
**Outstanding Documentary or Nonfiction Series**: **American Masters (PBS)**; **Years of Living Dangerously (Showtime)**; Cosmos: A Spacetime Odyssey (Fox / Nat Geo); Pioneers of Television (PBS); The World Wars (History)	**Outstanding Documentary or Nonfiction Special**: **American Experience (Episode: "JFK") (PBS)**; Paycheck to Paycheck: The Life and Times of Katrina Gilbert (HBO); Running from Crazy (OWN); The Sixties: The Assassination of President Kennedy (CNN); The Square (Netflix); Whoopi Goldberg Presents Moms Mabley (HBO)
**Outstanding Animated Program**: **Bob's Burgers (Episode: "Mazel-Tina") (Fox)**; Archer (Episode: "Archer Vice: The Rules of Extraction") (FX); Futurama (Episode: "Meanwhile") (Comedy Central); South Park (Episode: "Black Friday") (Comedy Central); Teenage Mutant Ninja Turtles (Episode: "The Manhattan Project") (Nickelodeon)	**Outstanding Short-Format Animated Program**: **Mickey Mouse (Episode: "O Sole Minnie") (Disney Channel)**; Adventure Time (Episode: "Be More") (Cartoon Network); Phineas and Ferb (Episode: "Thanks But No Thanks") (Disney Channel); Regular Show (Episode: "The Last Laserdisc Player") (Cartoon Network); Robot Chicken (Episode: "Born Again Virgin Christmas Special") (Cartoon Network)
**Outstanding Children's Program**: **One Last Hug: Three Days at Grief Camp (HBO)**; Degrassi (Nickelodeon); Dog with a Blog (Disney Channel); Good Luck Charlie (Disney Channel); Nick News with Linda Ellerbee: Family Secrets: When Violence Hits Home (Nickelodeon); Wynton Marsalis – A YoungArts Masterclass (HBO)	**Outstanding Special Class Program**: **67th Tony Awards (CBS)**; 71st Golden Globe Awards (NBC); 86th Academy Awards (ABC); 2014 Winter Olympics: Opening Ceremony (NBC); The Sound of Music Live! (NBC)
**Outstanding Short-Format Live-Action Entertainment Program**: **Between Two Ferns with Zach Galifianakis (funnyordie.com)**; Childrens Hospital (Cartoon Network); Parks and Rec in Europe (nbc.com); The Soup: True Detective (E!); Super Bowl XLVIII Halftime Show starring Bruno Mars (Fox)	**Outstanding Short-Format Nonfiction Program**: **30 for 30 Shorts (ESPN)**; Comedians in Cars Getting Coffee (Crackle); Cosmos: A National Geographic Deeper Dive (nationalgeographic.com); I Was There: Boston Marathon Bombings (History.com); Jay Leno's Garage (jaylenosgarage.com); Park Bench with Steve Buscemi (AOL)
**Outstanding Interactive Program**: **The Tonight Show Starring Jimmy Fallon Digital Experience (NBC)**; @midnight (Comedy Central); Game of Thrones: Premiere – Facebook Live and Instagram (HBO); The Voice (NBC)

=== Acting ===
Acting
**Outstanding Guest Actor in a Comedy Series**: **Jimmy Fallon as Various Characters on Saturday Night Live (Episode: "Host: Jimmy Fallon") (NBC)**; Steve Buscemi as Marty on Portlandia (Episode: "Celery") (IFC); Louis C.K. as Various Characters on Saturday Night Live (Episode: "Host: Louis C.K.") (NBC); Gary Cole as Kent Davison on Veep (Episode: "Crate") (HBO); Nathan Lane as Pepper Saltzman on Modern Family (Episode: "The Wedding, Part 2") (ABC); Bob Newhart as Arthur Jeffries / Professor Proton on The Big Bang Theory (Episode: "The Proton Transmogrification") (CBS)	**Outstanding Guest Actress in a Comedy Series**: **Uzo Aduba as Suzanne "Crazy Eyes" Warren on Orange Is the New Black (Episode: "Lesbian Request Denied") (Netflix)**; Laverne Cox as Sophia Burset on Orange Is the New Black (Episode: "Lesbian Request Denied") (Netflix); Joan Cusack as Sheila Jackson on Shameless (Episode: "Liver, I Hardly Know Her") (Showtime); Tina Fey as Various Characters on Saturday Night Live (Episode: "Host: Tina Fey") (NBC); Natasha Lyonne as Nicole "Nicky" Nichols on Orange Is the New Black (Episode: "WAC Pack") (Netflix); Melissa McCarthy as Various Characters on Saturday Night Live (Episode: "Host: Melissa McCarthy") (NBC)
**Outstanding Guest Actor in a Drama Series**: **Joe Morton as Rowan Pope on Scandal (Episode: "Guess Who's Coming To Dinner") (ABC)**; Dylan Baker as Colin Sweeney on The Good Wife (Episode: "Tying the Knot") (CBS); Beau Bridges as Barton Scully on Masters of Sex (Episode: "Manhigh") (Showtime); Reg E. Cathey as Freddy Hayes on House of Cards (Episode: "Chapter 22") (Netflix); Paul Giamatti as Harold Levinson on Downton Abbey (Episode: "Episode Eight") (PBS); Robert Morse as Bert Cooper on Mad Men (Episode: "Waterloo") (AMC)	**Outstanding Guest Actress in a Drama Series**: **Allison Janney as Margaret Scully on Masters of Sex (Episode: "Brave New World") (Showtime)**; Kate Burton as Vice President Sally Langston on Scandal (Episode: "A Door Marked Exit") (ABC); Jane Fonda as Leona Lansing on The Newsroom (Episode: "Red Team III") (HBO); Kate Mara as Zoe Barnes on House of Cards (Episode: "Chapter 14") (Netflix); Margo Martindale as Claudia on The Americans (Episode: "Behind the Red Door") (FX); Diana Rigg as Lady Olenna Tyrell on Game of Thrones (Episode: "The Lion and the Rose") (HBO)
**Outstanding Character Voice-Over Performance**: **Harry Shearer as Kent Brockman, Mr. Burns, and Smithers on The Simpsons (Episode: "Four Regrettings and a Funeral") (Fox)**; Chris Diamantopoulos as Mickey Mouse on Mickey Mouse (Episode: "The Adorable Couple") (Disney Channel); Stephen Full as Stan on Dog with a Blog (Episode: "My Parents Posted What?!") (Disney Channel); Seth Green as Various Characters on Robot Chicken DC Comics Special 2: Villains in Paradise (Cartoon Network); Seth MacFarlane as Peter Griffin, Stewie Griffin, and Glenn Quagmire on Family Guy (Episode: "Into Harmony's Way") (Fox); Maurice LaMarche as Calculon and Morbo on Futurama (Episode: "Calculon 2.0") (Comedy Central)	**Outstanding Narrator**: **Jeremy Irons on Game of Lions (Nat Geo)**; Daniel Craig on One Life (Nat Geo); Whoopi Goldberg on Whoopi Goldberg Presents Moms Mabley (HBO); Jane Lynch on Penguins: Waddle All The Way (Discovery Channel); Henry Strozier on Too Cute! (Animal Planet)

=== Animation ===
Animation
**Outstanding Individual Achievement in Animation (Juried)**
- **Adventure Time – Nick Jennings (Episode: "Wizards Only, Fools") (Cartoon Network)**
- **Gravity Falls – Ian Worrel (Episode: "Dreamscaperers") (Disney Channel)**
- **Long Live the Royals – Sean Szeles (CartoonNetwork.com)**
- **Mickey Mouse – Narina Sokolova (Episode: "‘O Sole Minnie") (Disney Channel)**
- **Mickey Mouse – Valerio Ventura (Episode: "The Adorable Couple") (Disney Channel)**
- **The Powerpuff Girls: Dance Pantsed – Jasmin Lai (Cartoon Network)**
- **Robot Chicken DC Comics Special 2: Villains in Paradise – Cameron Baity (Adult Swim)**
- **The Simpsons – Dmitry Malanitchev (Episode: "Treehouse of Horror XXIV") (Fox)**
- **The Simpsons – Charles Ragins (Episode: "Treehouse of Horror XXIV") (Fox)**
- **Uncle Grandpa – Nick Edwards (Episode: "Afraid of the Dark") (Cartoon Network)**

=== Art Direction ===
Art Direction
**Outstanding Art Direction for a Contemporary Program (Half-Hour or Less)**: **House of Lies (Episodes: "Wreckage"; "Middlegame"; "Zhang") (Showtime)**; The Big Bang Theory (Episodes: "The Hofstadter Insufficiency"; "The Locomotive Manipulation"; "The Proton Transmogrification") (CBS); Modern Family (Episode: "Las Vegas") (ABC); Silicon Valley (Episodes: "Articles of Incorporation"; "Signaling Risk"; "Optimal Tip-to-Tip Efficiency") (HBO); Veep (Episodes: "Clovis"; "Detroit"; "Special Relationship") (HBO)	**Outstanding Art Direction for a Contemporary or Fantasy Series (Single-Camera)**: **Game of Thrones (Episodes: "The Laws of Gods and Men"; "The Mountain and the Viper") (HBO)**; House of Cards (Episodes: "Chapter 18"; "Chapter 24") (Netflix); Justified (Episode: "The Toll") (FX); True Blood (Episodes: "At Last"; "Fuck the Pain Away"; "In the Evening") (HBO); True Detective (Episodes: "Form and Void"; "The Locked Room"; "Seeing Things") (HBO)
**Outstanding Art Direction for a Period Series, Miniseries, or Movie (Single-Camera)**: **Boardwalk Empire (Episodes: "Erlkönig"; "The Old Ship of Zion"; "Farewell Daddy Blues") (HBO)**; American Horror Story: Coven (FX); Downton Abbey (Episode: "Episode Eight") (PBS); Mad Men (Episode: "Time Zones") (AMC); Masters of Sex (Episode: "Pilot") (Showtime)	**Outstanding Art Direction for Variety, Nonfiction, Reality or Reality-Competition Program**: **86th Academy Awards (ABC)**; 2014 Winter Olympics: Opening Ceremony (NBC); Cosmos: A Spacetime Odyssey (Episodes: "Hiding in the Light"; "The Lost Worlds of Planet Earth"; "Unafraid of the Dark") (Fox / Nat Geo); Portlandia (Episodes: "Celery"; "Sharing Finances"; "3D Printer") (IFC); The Voice (Episodes: "Episode 601"; "Episode 516A"; "Episode 607") (NBC)

=== Casting ===
Casting
**Outstanding Casting for a Comedy Series**: **Orange Is the New Black - Jennifer Euston (Netflix)**; Louie - Gayle Keller (FX); Modern Family - Jeff Greenberg (ABC); Nurse Jackie - Julie Tucker and Ross Meyerson (Showtime); Veep - Allison Jones, Pat Moran, and Meredith Tucker (HBO)	**Outstanding Casting for a Drama Series**: **True Detective - Alexa L. Fogel, Christine Kromer and Meagan Lewis (HBO)**; Breaking Bad - Sharon Bialy, Sherry Thomas and Kiira Arai (AMC); Game of Thrones - Nina Gold and Robert Sterne(HBO); The Good Wife - Mark Saks (CBS); House of Cards - Laray Mayfield and Julie Schubert (Netflix)
**Outstanding Casting for a Miniseries, Movie, or Special**: **Fargo - Rachel Tenner, Jackie Lind, and Stephanie Gorin (FX)**; American Horror Story: Coven - Robert J. Ulrich, Eric Dawson, and Meagan Lewis (FX); The Normal Heart - Amanda Mackey and Cathy Sandrich Gelfond (HBO); Sherlock ("His Last Vow") --Julia Duff and Kate Rhodes James (PBS); Treme - Alexa L. Fogel and Meagan Lewis (HBO)

=== Choreography ===
Choreography
**Outstanding Choreography**
- **Tabitha and Napoleon D'umo for So You Think You Can Dance (Routines: "Routines: Puttin' on the Ritz / Gold Rush / Run the World") (Fox)**
  - Derek Hough for Dancing with the Stars (Routines: "Human / Ameksa / Too Darn Hot") (ABC)
  - Mandy Moore for So You Think You Can Dance (Routines: "Edge of Glory / Feelin' Good / I Can't Make You Love Me") (Fox)
  - Christopher Scott for So You Think You Can Dance (Routines: "Trigger / Sand / The Gravel Road") (Fox)
  - Travis Wall for So You Think You Can Dance (Routines: "Hanging by a Thread / Wicked Game / Medicine") (Fox)

=== Cinematography ===
Cinematography
**Outstanding Cinematography for a Multi-Camera Series**: **How I Met Your Mother – Christian La Fountaine (Episode: "Daisy") (CBS)**; 2 Broke Girls – Christian La Fountaine (Episode: "And the Near Death Experience") (CBS); The Exes – George Mooradian (Episode: "When Haskell Met Sammy") (TV Land); Last Man Standing – Donald A. Morgan (Episode: "Eve's Boyfriend") (ABC); Mike & Molly – Gary Baum (Episode: "Weekend at Peggy's") (CBS)	**Outstanding Cinematography for a Single-Camera Series**: **True Detective – Adam Arkapaw (Episode: "Who Goes There") (HBO)**; Breaking Bad – Michael Slovis (Episode: "Granite State") (AMC); Game of Thrones – Jonathan Freeman (Episode: "Two Swords") (HBO); Game of Thrones – Anette Haellmigk (Episode: "The Lion and the Rose") (HBO); Homeland – David Klein (Episode: "The Star") (Showtime); House of Cards – Igor Martinovic (Episode: "Chapter 18") (Netflix)
**Outstanding Cinematography for a Limited Series or Movie**: **Sherlock ("His Last Vow") – Neville Kidd (PBS)**; Fargo – Dana Gonzales (Episode: "Buridan's Ass") (FX); Fargo – Matt Lloyd (Episode: "The Crocodile's Dilemma") (FX); Fleming: The Man Who Would Be Bond – Ed Wild (BBC America); Killing Kennedy – Stephen St. John (Nat Geo); The Normal Heart – Danny Moder (HBO)	**Outstanding Cinematography for a Nonfiction Program**: **The Square (Netflix)**; Anthony Bourdain: Parts Unknown – Morgan Fallon (CNN); Anthony Bourdain: Parts Unknown – Todd Liebler and Zach Zamboni (CNN); Cosmos: A Spacetime Odyssey – Bill Pope (Fox / Nat Geo); Vice – Jake Burghart and Jerry Ricciotti (HBO)
**Outstanding Cinematography for a Reality Program**: **Deadliest Catch (Discovery Channel)**; Alaska: The Last Frontier (Discovery Channel); The Amazing Race (CBS); Project Runway (Lifetime); Survivor (CBS); The Voice (NBC)

=== Commercial ===
Commercial
**Outstanding Commercial**
- **"Misunderstood" (Apple Inc.)**
  - "Childlike Imagination" (General Electric)
  - "Hero's Welcome" (Budweiser)
  - "Possibilities" (Nike, Inc.)
  - "Puppy Love" (Budweiser)

=== Costumes ===
Costumes
**Outstanding Costumes for a Series**: **Game of Thrones (Episode: "The Lion and the Rose") (HBO)**; Boardwalk Empire (Episode: "New York Sour") (HBO); Downton Abbey (Episode: "Episode Eight") (PBS); Mad Men (Episode: "Time Zones") (AMC); Once Upon a Time (Episode: "A Curious Thing") (ABC)	**Outstanding Costumes for a Miniseries, Movie, or Special**: **American Horror Story: Coven (Episode: "Bitchcraft") (FX)**; House of Versace (Lifetime); The Normal Heart (HBO); Sherlock ("His Last Vow") (PBS); The White Queen (Episode: "The Price of Power") (Starz)
**Outstanding Costumes for a Variety Program or a Special**: **Saturday Night Live (Episode: "Host: Jimmy Fallon") (NBC)**; **So You Think You Can Dance (Episode: "Episode 1008") (Fox)**

=== Directing ===
Directing
**Outstanding Directing for Nonfiction Programming**: **Jehane Noujaim for The Square (Netflix)**; Brannon Braga for Cosmos: A Spacetime Odyssey (Episode: "Standing Up in the Milky Way") (Fox / Nat Geo); Ken Fuchs for Shark Tank (Episode: "Episode 501") (ABC); Craig Spirko for Project Runway (Episode: "Sky's The Limit") (Lifetime); Bertram van Munster for The Amazing Race (Episode: "Part Like The Red Sea") (CBS)	**Outstanding Directing for a Variety Series**: **Saturday Night Live (Episode: "Host: Jimmy Fallon"), Directed by Don Roy King (NBC)**; The Colbert Report (Episode: "Episode 9135"), Directed by James Hoskinson (Comedy Central); The Daily Show with Jon Stewart (Episode: "Episode 18153"), Directed by Chuck O'Neil (Comedy Central); Portlandia (Episode: "Getting Away"), Directed by Jonathan Krisel (IFC); The Tonight Show Starring Jimmy Fallon (Episode: "Episode 1: Will Smith/U2"), Directed by Dave Diomedi (NBC)

=== Hairstyling ===
Hairstyling
**Outstanding Hairstyling for a Single-Camera Series**: **Downton Abbey (Episode: "Episode Eight") (PBS)**; Boardwalk Empire (Episode: "William Wilson") (HBO); Game of Thrones (Episode: "The Lion and the Rose") (HBO); Mad Men (Episode: "The Runaways") (AMC); The Originals (Episode: "Dance Back from the Grave") (The CW)	**Outstanding Hairstyling for a Multi-Camera Series or Special**: **Saturday Night Live (Episode: "Host: Anna Kendrick") (NBC)**; 86th Academy Awards (ABC); Dancing with the Stars (Episode: "1805") (ABC); Key & Peele (Episode: "Substitute Teacher #3") (Comedy Central); The Voice (Episode: "419B") (NBC)
**Outstanding Hairstyling for a Miniseries or Movie**: **American Horror Story: Coven (FX)**; Bonnie & Clyde (Lifetime); Mob City (TNT); The Normal Heart (HBO); The White Queen (Starz)

=== Hosting ===
Hosting
**Outstanding Host for a Reality or Reality-Competition Program**
- **Jane Lynch for Hollywood Game Night (NBC)**
  - Tom Bergeron for Dancing with the Stars (ABC)
  - Anthony Bourdain for The Taste (ABC)
  - Cat Deeley for So You Think You Can Dance (Fox)
  - Heidi Klum and Tim Gunn for Project Runway (Lifetime)
  - Betty White for Betty White's Off Their Rockers (NBC)

=== Interactive Media ===
Interactive Media
**Multiplatform Storytelling (Juried)**: **Skywire Live with Nik Wallenda (Discovery Channel)**	**Original Interactive Program (Juried)**: **Just a Reflektor (AATOAA, Google Creative Lab, UNIT9)**
**Social TV Experience (Juried)**: **HitRecord on TV (Pivot)**; **Live from Space (Nat Geo)**	**User Experience and Visual Design (Juried)**: **Game of Thrones Viewers Guide (HBO)**; **Xfinity TV on the X1 Platform (Comcast)**

=== Lighting Design / Direction ===
Lighting Design / Direction
**Outstanding Lighting Design / Lighting Direction for a Variety Series**: **Dancing with the Stars (Episode: "Episode 1711A") (ABC)**; America's Got Talent (Episode: "Episode 826") (NBC); Saturday Night Live (Episode: "Host: Jimmy Fallon") (NBC); The Tonight Show Starring Jimmy Fallon (Episode: "Episode 1: Will Smith/U2") (NBC); The Voice (Episode: "Episode 619A") (NBC)	**Outstanding Lighting Design / Lighting Direction for a Variety Special**: **2014 Winter Olympics: Opening Ceremony (NBC)**; 56th Grammy Awards (CBS); 67th Tony Awards (CBS); 86th Academy Awards (ABC); The Beatles: The Night That Changed America (CBS); Super Bowl XLVIII Halftime Show starring Bruno Mars (Fox)

=== Main Title Design ===
Main Title Design
**Outstanding Main Title Design**
- **True Detective (HBO)**
  - Black Sails (Starz)
  - Cosmos: A Spacetime Odyssey (Fox / Nat Geo)
  - Masters of Sex (Showtime)
  - Silicon Valley (HBO)

=== Make-up ===
Make-up
**Outstanding Make-up for a Single-Camera Series (Non-Prosthetic)**: **True Detective (Episode: "The Secret Fate of All Life") (HBO)**; Boardwalk Empire (Episode: "Resolution") (HBO); Breaking Bad (Episode: "Ozymandias") (AMC); Game of Thrones (Episode: "Oathkeeper") (HBO); Mad Men (Episode: "The Runaways") (AMC)	**Outstanding Make-up for a Multi-Camera Series or Special (Non-Prosthetic)**: **Saturday Night Live (Episode: "Host: Jimmy Fallon") (NBC)**; Dancing with the Stars (Episode: "1703") (ABC); Key & Peele (Episode: "East/West Bowl Rap") (Comedy Central); So You Think You Can Dance (Episode: "Season 10 Finale") (Fox); The Voice (Episode: "Episode 516B") (NBC)
**Outstanding Make-up for a Miniseries or Movie (Non-Prosthetic)**: **The Normal Heart (HBO)**; American Horror Story: Coven (FX); Anna Nicole (Lifetime); Bonnie & Clyde (Lifetime); Fargo (FX)	**Outstanding Prosthetic Make-up for a Series, Miniseries, Movie, or Special**: **Game of Thrones (Episode: "The Children") (HBO)**; American Horror Story: Coven (FX); Anna Nicole (Lifetime); Boardwalk Empire (Episode: "William Wilson") (HBO); Breaking Bad (Episode: "Felina") (AMC); The Normal Heart (HBO)

=== Music ===
Music
**Outstanding Music Composition for a Series (Original Dramatic Score)**: **Alan Silvestri for Cosmos: A Spacetime Odyssey (Episode: "Standing Up in the Milky Way") (Fox / Nat Geo)**; Jeff Beal for House of Cards (Episode: "Chapter 26") (Netflix); T Bone Burnett for True Detective (Episode: "Form and Void") (HBO); Ramin Djawadi for Game of Thrones (Episode: "The Mountain and the Viper") (HBO); John Lunn for Downton Abbey (Episode: "Episode Eight") (PBS)	**Outstanding Music Composition for a Miniseries, Movie, or Special (Original Dramatic Score)**: **David Arnold and Michael Price for Sherlock ("His Last Vow") (PBS)**; Ludovic Bource for Clear History (HBO); James Levine for American Horror Story: Coven (Episode: "The Seven Wonders") (FX); John Lunn for The White Queen (Episode: "The Final Battle") (Starz); Rob Mathes for Herblock: The Black and The White (HBO); Jeff Russo for Fargo (Episode: "The Crocodile's Dilemma") (FX)
**Outstanding Music Direction**: **The Beatles: The Night That Changed America (CBS)**; 67th Tony Awards (CBS); 86th Academy Awards (ABC); Barbra Streisand: Back to Brooklyn (Great Performances) (PBS); Saturday Night Live (Episode: "Host: Jimmy Fallon") (NBC); The Sound of Music Live! (NBC)	**Outstanding Original Music and Lyrics**: **67th Tony Awards (Song: "Bigger!") (CBS)**; A Christmas Carol: The Concert (Song: "No Trouble") (PBS); Key & Peele (Episode: "Substitute Teacher #3") (Song: "Les Mis") (Comedy Central); Saturday Night Live (Episode: "Host: Jimmy Fallon") (Song: "Home for the Holiday (Twin Bed)") (NBC); Sofia the First: The Floating Palace (Song: "Merroway Cove") (Disney Channel); Sons of Anarchy (Episode: "A Mother's Work") (Song: "Day is Gone") (FX)
**Outstanding Original Main Title Theme Music**: **Alan Silvestri for Cosmos: A Spacetime Odyssey (Fox / Nat Geo)**; Andrew Feltenstein and John Nau for The Spoils of Babylon (IFC); Daniele Luppi for Magic City (Starz); Bear McCreary for Black Sails (Starz); Brian Tyler and Robert Lydecker for Sleepy Hollow (Fox)

=== Picture Editing ===
Picture Editing
**Outstanding Single-Camera Picture Editing for a Drama Series**: **Breaking Bad – Skip MacDonald (Episode: "Felina") (AMC)**; Breaking Bad – Kelley Dixon (Episode: "To'hajiilee") (AMC); Breaking Bad – Kelly Dixon and Chris McCaleb (Episode: "Granite State") (AMC); House of Cards – Byron Smith (Episode: "Chapter 14") (Netflix); True Detective – Affonso Gonçalves (Episode: "Who Goes There") (HBO)	**Outstanding Single-Camera Picture Editing for a Comedy Series**: **Orange Is the New Black – William Turro (Episode: "Tit Punch") (Netflix)**; Modern Family – Ryan Case (Episode: "Las Vegas") (ABC); Orange Is the New Black – Shannon Mitchell (Episode: "Tall Men With Feelings") (Netflix); Orange Is the New Black – Michael S. Stern (Episode: "Can't Fix Crazy") (Netflix); Portlandia – Bill Benz and Daniel Gray Longino (Episode: "Getting Away") (IFC)
**Outstanding Single-Camera Picture Editing for a Miniseries or Movie**: **Sherlock ("His Last Vow") – Yan Miles (PBS)**; Fargo – Regis Kimble (Episode: "Buridan's Ass") (FX); Fargo – Bridget Durnford (Episode: "The Rooster Prince") (FX); Fargo – Skip MacDonald (Episode: "The Crocodile's Dilemma") (FX); The Normal Heart – Adam Penn (HBO)	**Outstanding Multi-Camera Picture Editing for a Comedy Series**: **The Big Bang Theory – Peter Chakos (Episode: "The Cooper Extraction") (CBS)**; The Colbert Report – Christein Aromando and Jason Baker (Episode: "Episode 9115") (Comedy Central); The Daily Show with Jon Stewart – Eric Davies, Graham Frazier, Daric Schlesselman, and Robert York (Episode: "Episode 19006") (Comedy Central); How I Met Your Mother – Sue Federman (Episode: "Gary Blauman") (CBS); Jimmy Kimmel Live! – Jason Bielski, James Crowe, Brian Marsh, Kevin McCullough, and Matt Williams (Episode: "Behind the Scandelabra") (ABC)
**Outstanding Picture Editing for Short-Form Segments and Variety Specials**: **The Daily Show with Jon Stewart – Eric Davies (Comedy Central)**; AFI Life Achievement Award: A Tribute to Mel Brooks – Dave Brown, Debra Light, Thomas Mitchell, Michael Polito, and Pi Ware (TNT); Billy Crystal: 700 Sundays – Kent Beyda; The Colbert Report – Christein Aromando (Comedy Central); The Colbert Report – Jason Baker (Comedy Central)	**Outstanding Picture Editing for Nonfiction Programming**: **The Square – Christopher de la Torre, Muhamed El Manasterly, and Pedro Kos (Netflix)**; American Masters – Stephen Ellis, Gordon Mason, and Phil McDonald (PBS); Anthony Bourdain: Parts Unknown – Nick Brigden (CNN); Cosmos: A Spacetime Odyssey – John Duffy, Eric Lea, and Michael O'Halloran (Fox / Nat Geo); The Sixties: The Assassination of President Kennedy – Chris A. Peterson (CNN)
**Outstanding Picture Editing for Reality Programming**: **Deadliest Catch – Rob Butler, Josh Earl, and Art O'Leary (Discovery Channel)**; The Amazing Race – Andy Castor, Eric Goldfarb, Julian Gomez, Andrew Kozar, Jennifer Nelson, Paul C. Nielsen, and Jacob Parsons (CBS); Naked and Afraid – Emily Hsuan and Chris Meyer (Discovery Channel); Project Runway – Julie Cohen, Eileen Finkelstein, Scott Austin Hahn, Yaffa Lerea, Ryan Mallick, and Adrienne Salisbury (Lifetime); Survivor – Dave Armstrong, Tim Atzinger, Andrew Bolhuis, Frederick Hawthrone, Evan Mediuch, and Joubin Mortazavi (CBS); The Voice – William Fabian Castro, Noel Guerra, John M. Larson, Robert M. Malachowski Jr., James Munoz, Eric B. Shanks, Hudson H. Smith III, Jason Stewart, and Robby Thompson (NBC)

=== Sound ===
Sound
**Outstanding Sound Editing for a Series**: **Black Sails (Episode: "I.") (Starz)**; Boardwalk Empire (Episode: "White Horse Pike") (HBO); Breaking Bad (Episode: "Felina") (AMC); Game of Thrones (Episode: "The Watchers on the Wall") (HBO); The Walking Dead (Episode: "Too Far Gone") (AMC)	**Outstanding Sound Editing for a Miniseries, Movie, or Special**: **Sherlock ("His Last Vow") (PBS)**; American Horror Story: Coven (Episode: "Fearful Pranks Ensue") (FX); Bonnie & Clyde (Episode: "Night Two") (Lifetime); Fargo (Episode: "The Crocodile's Dilemma") (FX); Klondike (Episode: "Part 1") (Discovery Channel); Mob City (Episodes: "Oxpecker", "Stay Down") (TNT)
**Outstanding Sound Editing for Nonfiction Programming (Single or Multi-Camera)**: **Cosmos: A Spacetime Odyssey (Episode: "Standing Up in the Milky Way") (Fox / Nat Geo)**; The Amazing Race (Episode: "Part Like The Red Sea") (CBS); Anthony Bourdain: Parts Unknown (Episode: "Punjab") (CNN); Vice (Episode: "Terrorist University / Armageddon Now") (HBO); The World Wars (Episode: "Trial by Fire") (History)	**Outstanding Sound Mixing for a Comedy or Drama Series (One Hour)**: **House of Cards (Episode: "Chapter 14") (Netflix)**; Breaking Bad (Episode: "Felina") (AMC); Downton Abbey (Episode: "Episode Eight") (PBS); Game of Thrones (Episode: "The Watchers on the Wall") (HBO); Homeland (Episode: "Good Night") (Showtime)
**Outstanding Sound Mixing for a Miniseries or Movie**: **Treme (Episode: "Sunset on Louisianne") (HBO)**; American Horror Story: Coven (Episode: "Fearful Pranks Ensue") (FX); Fargo (Episode: "The Crocodile's Dilemma") (FX); Killing Kennedy (Nat Geo); Sherlock ("His Last Vow") (PBS)	**Outstanding Sound Mixing for a Comedy or Drama Series (Half-Hour) and Animation**: **Nurse Jackie (Episode: "The Lady with the Lamp") (Showtime)**; Californication (Episode: "Kickoff") (Showtime); Modern Family (Episode: "The Wedding, Part 1") (ABC); The Simpsons (Episode: "Married to the Blob") (Fox); Veep (Episode: "Detroit") (HBO)
**Outstanding Sound Mixing for a Variety Series or Special**: **56th Grammy Awards (CBS)**; 86th Academy Awards (ABC); The Beatles: The Night That Changed America (CBS); The Kennedy Center Honors (CBS); The Voice (Episode: "Episode 516B") (NBC)	**Outstanding Sound Mixing for Nonfiction Programming**: **Jimi Hendrix: Hear My Train A Comin' (American Masters) (PBS)**; The Amazing Race (Episode: "Part Like The Red Sea") (CBS); Anthony Bourdain: Parts Unknown (Episode: "Tokyo") (CNN); Cosmos: A Spacetime Odyssey (Episode: "Standing Up in the Milky Way") (Fox / Nat Geo); Deadliest Catch (Episode: "Careful What You Wish For") (Discovery Channel)

=== Special Visual Effects ===
Special Visual Effects
**Outstanding Special Visual Effects**: **Game of Thrones (Episode: "The Children") (HBO)**; The 100 (Episode: "We are Grounders, Part 2") (The CW); Agents of S.H.I.E.L.D. (Episode: "T.A.H.I.T.I.") (ABC); Almost Human (Episode: "Pilot") (Fox); Cosmos: A Spacetime Odyssey (Episode: "The Immortals") (Fox / Nat Geo)	**Outstanding Special Visual Effects in a Supporting Role**: **Black Sails (Episode: "I.") (Starz)**; Da Vinci's Demons (Episode: "The Sins of Daedalus") (Starz); Hawaii Five-0 (Episode: "Ho'onani Makuakane") (CBS); Mob City (Episode: "A Guy Walks Into a Bar") (TNT); Vikings (Episode: "Invasion") (History); The Walking Dead (Episode: "30 Days Without an Accident") (AMC)

=== Stunt Coordination ===
Stunt Coordination
**Outstanding Stunt Coordination for a Comedy Series or Variety Program**: **Brooklyn Nine-Nine (Fox)**; Community (NBC); It's Always Sunny in Philadelphia (FX); Sam & Cat (Nickelodeon); Shameless (Showtime)	**Outstanding Stunt Coordination for a Drama Series, Miniseries, or Movie**: **The Blacklist (NBC)**; Game of Thrones (HBO); Grimm (NBC); Hawaii Five-0 (CBS); Revolution (NBC); True Blood (HBO)

=== Technical Direction ===
Technical Direction
**Outstanding Technical Direction, Camerawork, Video Control for a Series**: **Dancing with the Stars (Episode: "Episode 1711A") (ABC)**; The Big Bang Theory (Episode: "The Locomotive Manipulation") (CBS); The Daily Show with Jon Stewart (Episode: "Episode 18153") (Comedy Central); Jimmy Kimmel Live! (Episode: "In Austin") (ABC); Saturday Night Live (Episode: "Host: Jimmy Fallon") (NBC); The Voice (Episode: "Episode 519A") (NBC)	**Outstanding Technical Direction, Camerawork, Video Control for a Miniseries, Movie, or Special**: **The Sound of Music Live! (NBC)**; 67th Tony Awards (CBS); 86th Academy Awards (ABC); 2014 Winter Olympics: Opening Ceremony (NBC)

=== Writing ===
Writing
**Outstanding Writing for Nonfiction Programming**: **Cosmos: A Spacetime Odyssey (Episode: "Standing Up in the Milky Way") (Fox / Nat Geo)**; American Experience (Episode: "JFK") (PBS); Anthony Bourdain: Parts Unknown (Episode: "Congo") (CNN); The World Wars (Episode: "Trial by Fire") (History); Years of Living Dangerously (Episode: "The Surge") (Showtime)	**Outstanding Writing for a Variety Series**: **The Colbert Report (Comedy Central)**; The Daily Show with Jon Stewart (Comedy Central); Inside Amy Schumer (Comedy Central); Key & Peele (Comedy Central); Portlandia (IFC); The Tonight Show Starring Jimmy Fallon (NBC)
