= Shadows of Forgotten Ancestors (disambiguation) =

Shadows of Forgotten Ancestors is a 1965 Soviet-era Ukrainian film by Sergei Parajanov.

Shadows of Forgotten Ancestors may also refer to:

- Shadows of Forgotten Ancestors (novel), a 1911 novel by Mykhailo Kotsiubynsky at the basis of the film
- Shadows of Forgotten Ancestors (Sagan and Druyan book), a 1992 book by Carl Sagan and Ann Druyan
- "Shadows of Forgotten Ancestors" (song), a 2022 song by Alina Pash
- "Shadows of Forgotten Ancestors" (Cosmos: Possible Worlds), a 2020 episode of the TV series Cosmos: Possible Worlds
