= The World Set Free (Cosmos: A Spacetime Odyssey) =

- Cosmos: A Spacetime Odyssey episode
- Episode no.: Episode 12
- Directed by: Brannon Braga
- Written by: Ann Druyan; Steven Soter
- Narrated by: Neil deGrasse Tyson
- Editing by: John Duffy; Michael O'Halloran; Eric Lea
- Production code: 112
- Original air date: June 1, 2014
- Running time: 40 minutes

Episode chronology
← Previous "The Immortals"	Next → "Unafraid of the Dark"

"The World Set Free" is the twelfth episode of the American documentary television series Cosmos: A Spacetime Odyssey. It premiered on June 1, 2014, on Fox, and aired on June 2, 2014, on National Geographic Channel. The episode was written by Ann Druyan and Steven Soter, and directed by Brannon Braga. The episode explores global warming, humanity's effect on the Earth's atmosphere, and what we can do to mitigate it, including a look at alternative energy technologies. The episode also examines the planet Venus to inspect the runaway greenhouse effect. The episode's title alludes to H. G. Wells' novel published in 1914, The World Set Free, where Wells predicts that humanity will develop destructive nuclear weapons, perpetuating a devastating global war and forcing the world to come to its senses to create a peaceful society that harnesses the power of atomic energy.

== Episode summary ==
The increase in surface temperatures on Earth due to global warming

This episode explores the nature of the greenhouse effect and the evidence demonstrating the existence of global warming from humanity's influence. Tyson begins by describing the long-term history of the planet Venus; based on readings from the Venera series of probes to the planet, the planet had once had an ocean and an atmosphere, but due to the release of carbon dioxide from volcanic eruptions, the runaway greenhouse effect on Venus caused the surface temperatures to increase and boiled away the oceans.

Tyson then notes the delicate nature of the amount of carbon dioxide in the atmosphere can influence Earth's climate due to the greenhouse effect, and that levels of carbon dioxide have been increasing since the start of the 20th century. Evidence has shown this to be from mankind's consumption of oil, coal, and gas instead of from volcanic eruptions due to the isotopic signature of the carbon dioxide. The increase in carbon dioxide has led to an increase in temperatures, in turn leading to positive feedback loops of the melting polar ice caps and thawing-out of the permafrost to increase carbon dioxide levels.

As early as 1896 Svante Arrhenius published a scientific paper regarding Man's emission of carbon dioxide, followed by Edward Olson Hulburt in the 1930s and Guy Callendar.

Tyson then notes that humans have discovered means of harvesting solar power. At the 1878 World's Fair Augustin Mouchot won a gold medal for his solar power concentrator. In 1913 Frank Shuman constructed a solar powered irrigation plant in Egypt, with a view to transforming Sahara to arable land. Tyson points out that in both cases, the economics and ease of using cheap coal and oil caused these inventions to be overlooked at the time. Today, solar and wind-power systems would be able to collect enough solar energy from the Sun easily. Tyson then compares the motivation for switching to these cleaner forms of energy to the efforts of the Space Race and emphasizes that it is not too late for humanity to correct its course.

== Reception ==
The episode received a 1.3/4 in the 18-49 rating/share, with 3.52 million American viewers watching on Fox. It placed third and last in its timeslot behind Believe and The Good Wife; and tenth out of fifteenth for the night.
