= The Electric Boy =

- Cosmos: A Spacetime Odyssey episode
- Episode no.: Season 1 Episode 10
- Directed by: Bill Pope
- Written by: Ann Druyan; Steven Soter
- Narrated by: Neil deGrasse Tyson
- Editing by: John Duffy; Michael O'Halloran; Eric Lea
- Production code: 109
- Original air date: May 11, 2014
- Running time: 41 minutes

Episode chronology
← Previous "The Lost Worlds of Planet Earth"	Next → "The Immortals"

"The Electric Boy" is the tenth episode of the American documentary television series Cosmos: A Spacetime Odyssey. It premiered on May 11, 2014 on Fox, and aired on May 12, 2014 on National Geographic Channel. The episode was directed by Bill Pope, and written by Ann Druyan and Steven Soter. The episode explores the Earth's magnetic field and the contributions of Michael Faraday (1791 – 1867), which paved the way for high technology and light-speed communication.

== Episode summary ==
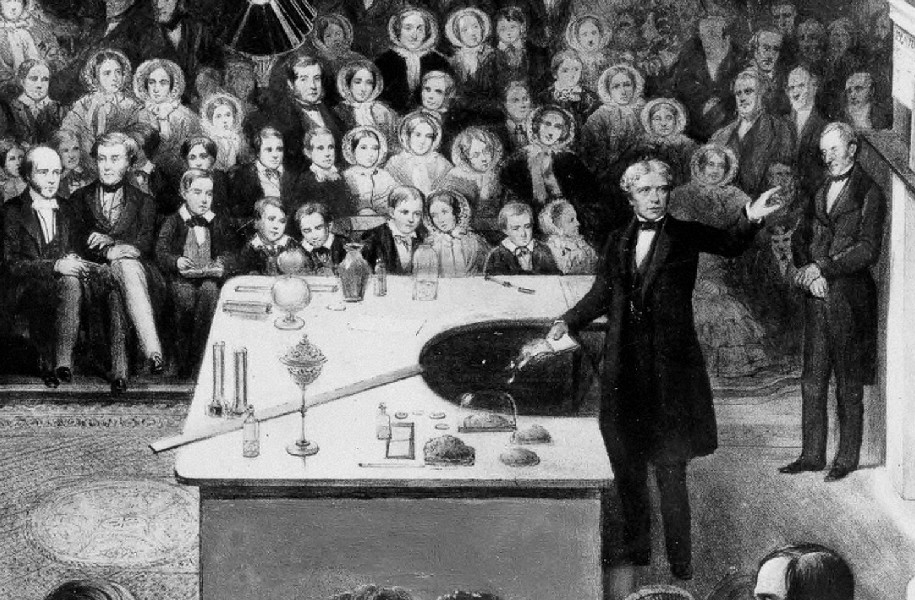
Michael Faraday presenting his experiments with electromagnetism at a Christmas Lecture, 1856

This episode provides an overview of the nature of electromagnetism, as discovered through the work of Michael Faraday. Tyson explains how the idea of another force of nature, similar to gravitational forces, had been postulated by Isaac Newton before. Tyson continues on Faraday, coming from poor beginnings, would end up becoming interested in studying electricity after reading books and seeing lectures by Humphry Davy at the Royal Institution. Davy would hire Faraday after seeing extensive notes he had taken to act as his secretary and lab assistant.

After Davy and chemist William Hyde Wollaston unsuccessfully tried to build on Hans Christian Ørsted's discovery of the electromagnetic phenomena to harness the ability to create motion from electricity, Faraday was able to create his own device to create the first electric motor by applying electricity aligned along a magnet. Davy, bitter over Faraday's breakthrough, put Faraday on the task of improving the quality of high-quality optical glass, preventing Faraday from continuing his research. Faraday, undeterred, continued to work in the Royal Institution, and created the Christmas Lectures designed to teach science to children. Following Davy's death, Faraday returned to full time efforts studying electromagnetism, creating the first electrical generator by inserting a magnet in a coil of wires.

Tyson continues to note that despite losing some of his mental capacity, Faraday concluded that electricity and magnetism were connected by unseen fields, and postulated that light may also be tied to these forces. Using a sample of the optical glass that Davy had him make, Faraday discovered that an applied magnetic field could affect the polarization of light passing through the glass sample (a dielectric material), leading to what is called the Faraday effect and connecting these three forces. Faraday postulated that these fields existed across the planet, which would later be called Earth's magnetic field generated by the rotating molten iron inner core, as well as the phenomena that caused the planets to rotate around the sun. Faraday's work was initially rejected by the scientific community due to his lack of mathematical support, but James Clerk Maxwell would later come to rework Faraday's theories into the Maxwell's equations that validated Faraday's theories. Their combined efforts created the basis of science that drives the principles of modern communications today.

== Episode title ==
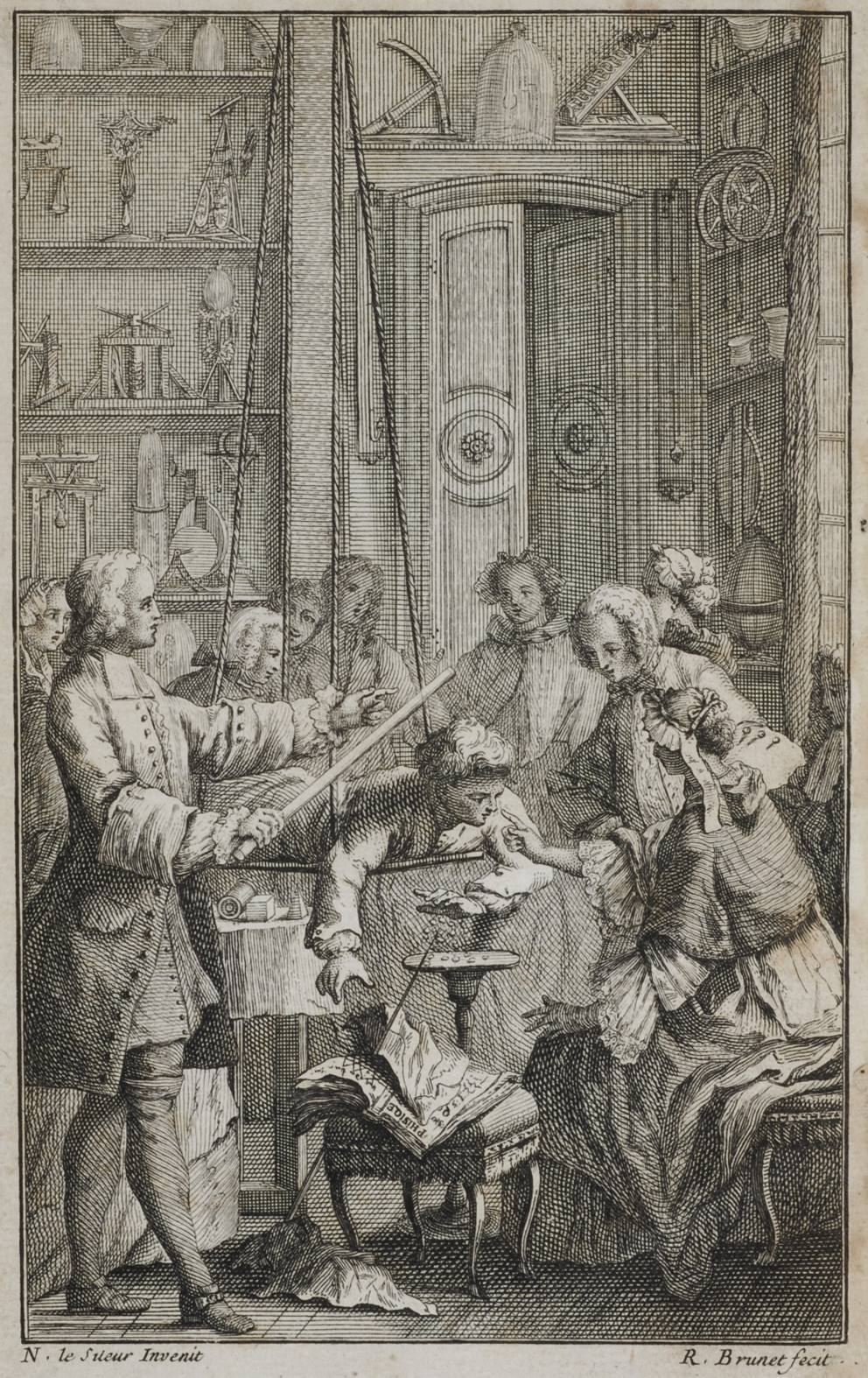
The Electric Boy, Essai sur l'electricité des corps, 1746

Faraday can be seen as an "electric boy" because of his electrical discoveries. Also, "The Electric Boy" was an experimental demonstration of static electricity popular in the eighteenth-century. A young man was suspended from the ceiling using insulating silk cords, and electrified, causing his body to act as a magnet. Objects were attracted to him, and close proximity of another person could lead to sparks.

== Reception ==
The episode received a 1.1/3 in the 18-49 rating/share, with 3.46 million American viewers watching on Fox. It placed third and last in its timeslot behind The Good Wife and Rosemary's Baby; and eleventh out of fifteenth for the night.
