= The Immortals (Cosmos: A Spacetime Odyssey) =

- Cosmos: A Spacetime Odyssey episode
- Episode no.: Season 1 Episode 11
- Directed by: Brannon Braga
- Written by: Ann Druyan; Steven Soter
- Narrated by: Neil deGrasse Tyson
- Editing by: John Duffy; Michael O'Halloran; Eric Lea
- Production code: 111
- Original air date: May 18, 2014
- Running time: 43 minutes

Guest appearance
- Christiane Amanpour as Enheduanna

Episode chronology
← Previous "The Electric Boy"	Next → "The World Set Free"

"The Immortals" is the eleventh episode of the American documentary television series Cosmos: A Spacetime Odyssey. It premiered on May 18, 2014, on Fox, and aired on May 19, 2014, on National Geographic Channel. The episode was written by Ann Druyan and Steven Soter, and directed by Brannon Braga. The episode explores the possibility of the interstellar spread of life and possible alien encounters. The episode also presents the hypothesis of panspermia, where the origin of life is attributed to comets or asteroids carrying radiation-resistant organisms.

== Episode summary ==
This episode covers the nature of how life may have developed on Earth and the possibility of life on other planets. Tyson begins by explaining how the human development of writing systems enabled the transfer of information through generations, describing how Princess Enheduanna ca. 2280 BCE would be one of the first to sign her name to her works, and how Gilgamesh collected stories, including that of Utnapishtim documenting a great flood comparable to the story of Noah's Ark. Tyson explains how DNA similarly records information to propagate life, and postulates theories of how DNA originated on Earth, including evolution from a shallow tide pool, or from the ejecta of meteor collisions from other planets. In the latter case, Tyson explains how comparing the composition of the Nakhla meteorite in 1911 to results collected by the Viking program demonstrated that material from Mars could transit to Earth, and the ability of some microbes to survive the harsh conditions of space. With the motions of solar systems through the galaxy over billions of years, life could conceivably propagate from planet to planet in the same manner.

Tyson then moves on to consider if life on other planets could exist. He explains how Project Diana, performed in the 1940s, showed that radio waves are able to travel in space, and that all of humanity's broadcast signals continue to radiate into space from our planet. Tyson says that projects have since looked for similar signals potentially emanating from other solar systems and that the development and lifespan of extraterrestrial civilizations must be considered for such detection to be realized. According to Tyson, civilizations can be wiped out by cosmic events like supernovae, natural disasters such as the Toba disaster, or even self-destruct through war or other means, making probability estimates difficult. Tyson describes how elliptical galaxies, in which some of the oldest red dwarf stars exist, would offer the best chance of finding established civilizations. He concludes that human intelligence properly applied should allow our species to avoid such disasters and enable us to migrate beyond the Earth before the Sun's eventual transformation into a red giant.

Tyson ends the episode by speculating that our descendants will marvel at how many rivers we had to cross on Earth before we found our way to the stars.

== Reception ==
The episode received a 1.1/3 in the 18-49 rating/share, with 3.24 million American viewers watching on Fox. It placed second out of third in its timeslot between The Good Wife and The Women of SNL; and ninth out of fourteenth for the night.

Jennifer Ouellette wrote in the Los Angeles Times, "After several wonderful narrative- and character-driven episodes, it's a bit of a letdown to have the series lapse back into the tenuous connections and aimless wandering of earlier episodes. 'The Immortals' talks a lot about the power of story; too bad it doesn't heed its own counsel in this case."
