= Wanderers (2014 film) =

- Title card
- Directed by: Erik Wernquist
- Written by: Carl Sagan
- Based on: Pale Blue Dot: A Vision of the Human Future in Space
- Produced by: Erik Wernquist
- Starring: Anna Nerman; Camilla Hammarström; Hanna Mellin
- Narrated by: Carl Sagan
- Edited by: Erik Wernquist
- Music by: Cristian Sandquist
- Release date: October 11, 2014
- Running time: 3:50 minutes
- Country: Sweden
- Language: English

Wanderers is a 2014 Swedish science fiction short film created by the digital artist and animator Erik Wernquist. The film depicts actual locations in the Solar System being investigated by human explorers, aided by hypothetical space technology. Of the film's fifteen scenes, Wernquist created some using solely computer graphics, but most are based on actual photographs taken by robotic spacecraft or rovers combined with additional computer-generated elements.

Wanderers is narrated by astronomer Carl Sagan, reading from his 1994 book Pale Blue Dot: A Vision of the Human Future in Space.

== Plot ==
The film begins with a group of nomads around 10,000 BC, travelling through the Middle East on Earth. Shining clearly above them in the darkening twilight sky are the five naked eye "wandering stars" in the Solar System which might be visited some day by descendants of the human wanderers. The film then cuts to the future and shows a large interplanetary spacecraft leaving Earth's orbit, carrying space colonists on their way to another planet or moon.

=== Mars ===
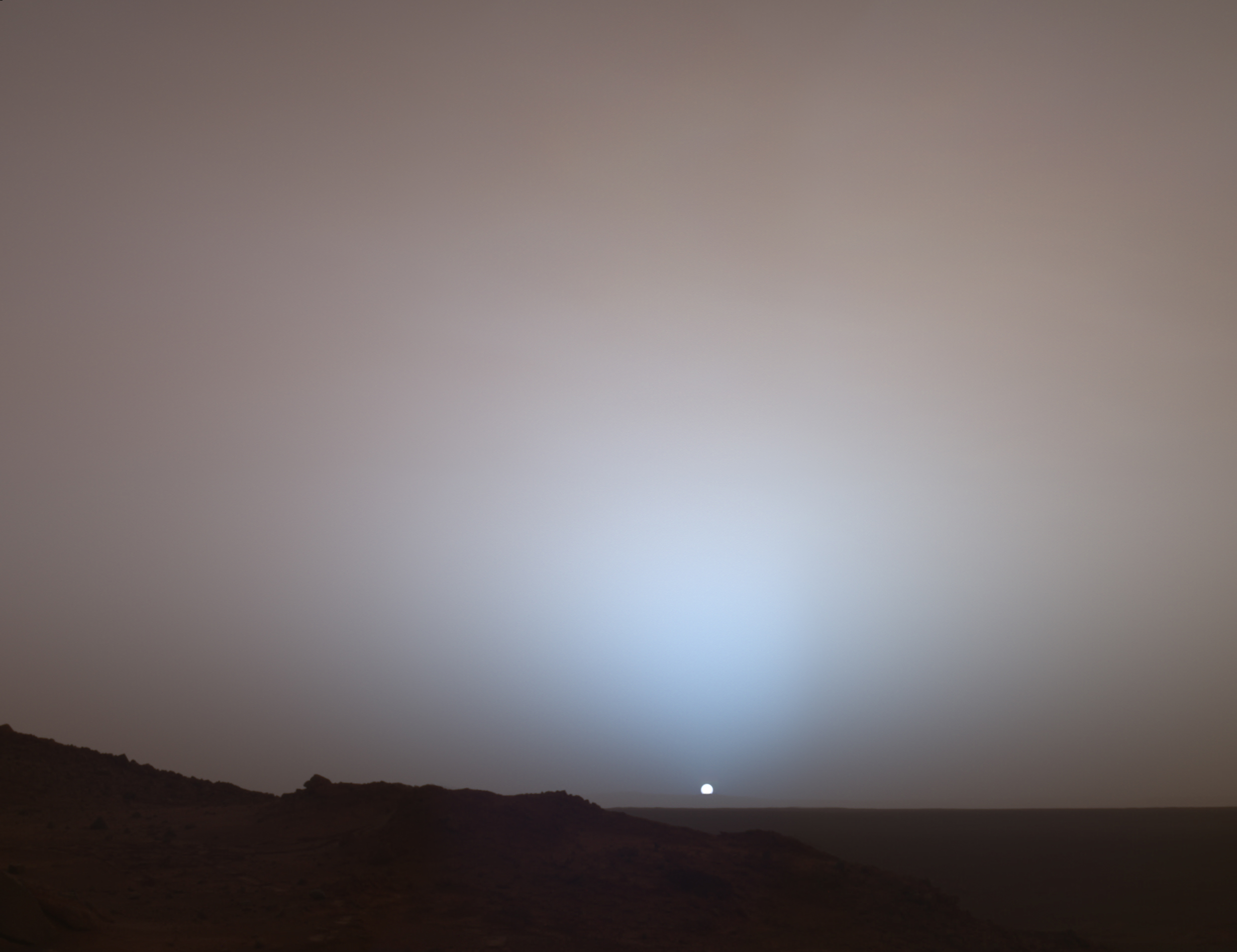
Erik Wernquist adds human explorers to this photo taken by NASA's Spirit rover on Mars to create the "Blue Sunset" scene in Wanderers.

Other than Earth's Moon, no other body in the Solar System has been explored and examined for possible future human colonization more intently than Mars. In Wanderers, Wernquist starts with NASA photographs and crafts three scenes showing the possible Martian future: in the first, the cabin of a theorized space elevator descends down its cable, transporting supplies to a Mars colony below, in the second, workers in space suits wait near the edge of Victoria Crater for approaching dirigibles, and in the third, a group of hikers (who are presumably accustomed to watching red sunsets on Earth) enjoy the sight of the Martian sky glowing blue around the setting Sun.

=== Saturn and its moons ===
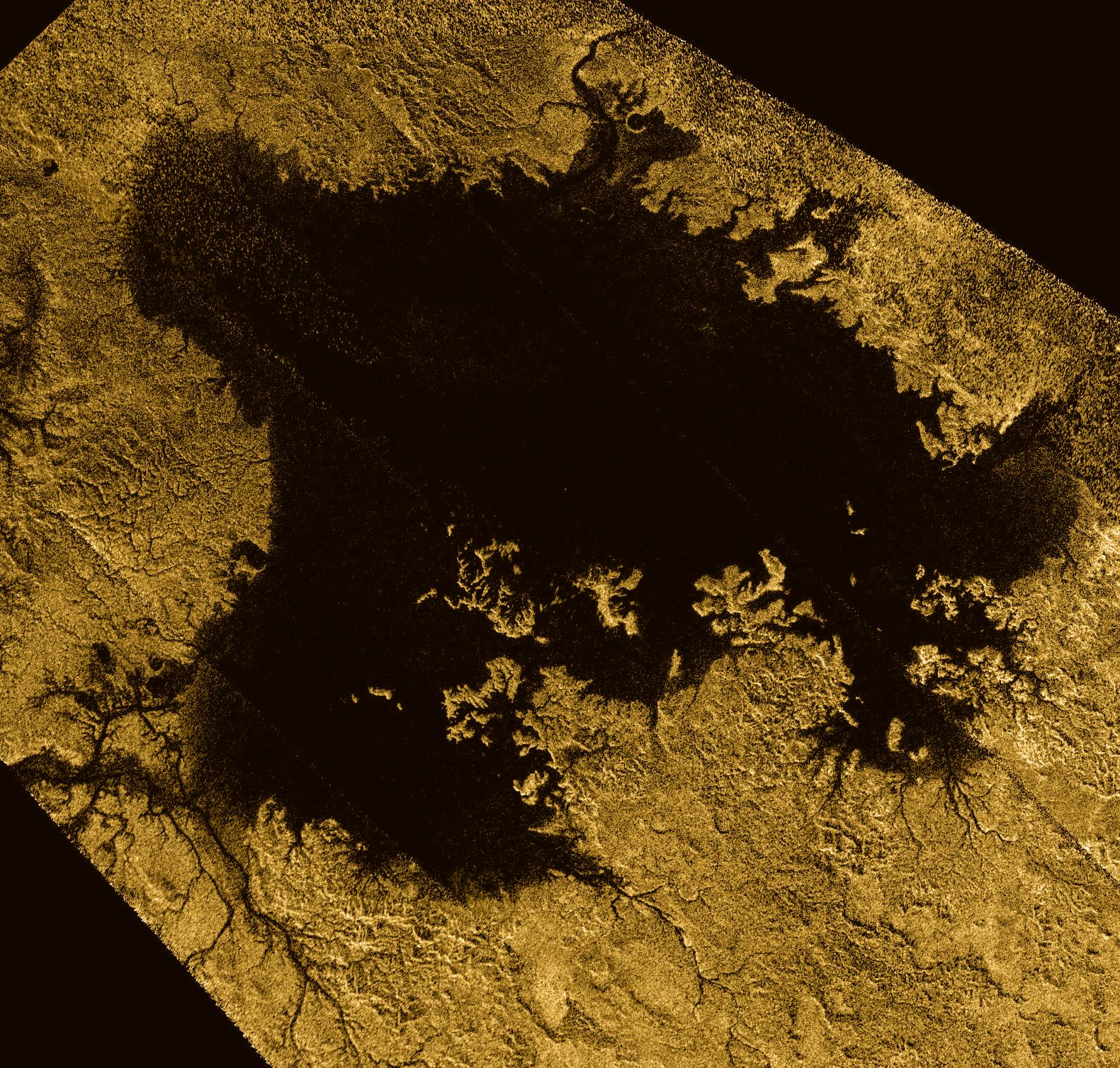
Wanderers shows adventurers wearing bird-like wings flying over the liquid methane lake Ligeia Mare on Saturn's moon Titan.

Wanderers makes good use of the wealth of information and images returned by the NASA / ESA Cassini–Huygens mission: one third of its scenes depict either Saturn or one of its moons. One scene gives an extreme close-up view of Saturn's rings - the perspective is from inside the plane of the rings, looking up from within the jumble of water ice chunks that compose the rings to a person floating just above the plane. The final scene (discussed in more detail below) shows the rings at a distance, lit up by the Sun behind them, casting a luminous glow on Saturn's nighttime cloud tops that Wernquist refers to as "ringshine."

In a scene on Saturn's moon Titan which is only made imaginable by Titan's relatively low levels of gravity, its thick, hazy atmosphere, and a not-yet-discovered hyper-efficient thermal insulating material, humans fly above the moon's liquid methane sea Ligeia Mare using wings that are approximately the same size - relative to their bodies - as bird wings. The view of a spacecraft moving through the salt water crystals ejected from geysers on Saturn's moon Enceladus is a reminder that a liquid ocean beneath its icy surface could potentially provide an environment capable of sustaining some form of life. A chain of human settlements on Saturn's moon Iapetus are portrayed on the peaks of its equatorial ridge, each covered with an enormous and (apparently) transparent dome that does not obstruct the view of Saturn and its rings. (Since the orbit of Iapetus is more inclined relative to the rings than any of Saturn's other major moons, Wernquist helpfully adds that the beautiful view "would make for some highly valuable real estate.")

=== Jupiter, its moon Europa, and Miranda (moon of Uranus) ===
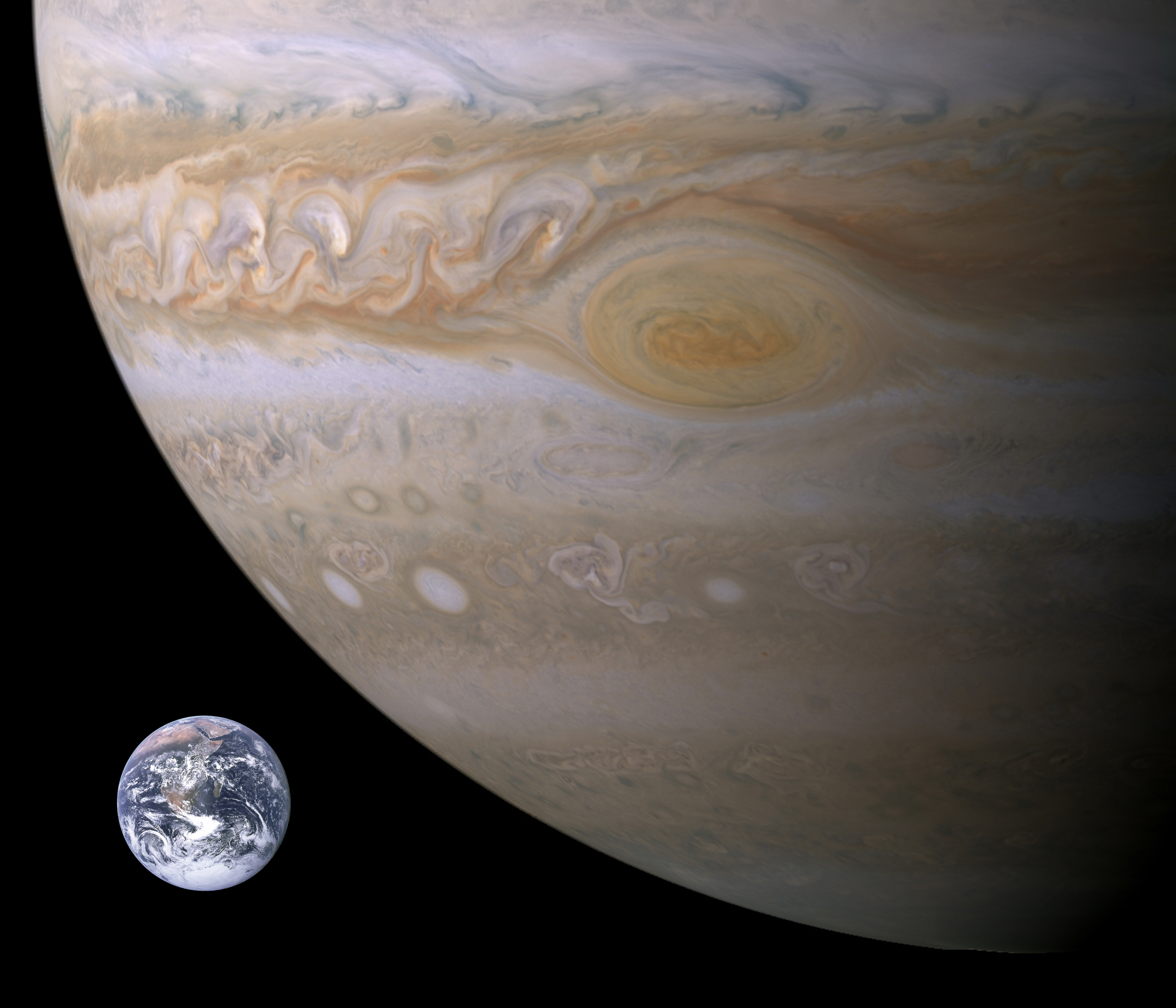
Compared to Earth's gravity, Jupiter's massive bulk creates such suffocating surface gravity that Wanderers could only show space adventurers near the Great Red Spot by depicting them in weightless orbit above it.

Wanderers does not specify whether any of the space explorers it depicts are governmentally-sponsored astronauts, cosmonauts, or taikonauts, if they are alternately commercial astronauts, space flight participants, or solely space tourists. Wernquist calls them simply "passengers", "people," and "hikers," and none of the spacecraft transporting them carry the insignia of a space agency or a privately funded space enterprise. Regardless of their official designation, the people shown in the two Jupiter scenes and the one scene showcasing Uranus and its moon Miranda must be referred to as "adventurers."

In a scene shown from orbit above Jupiter, a spacecraft's cargo bay doors open to reveal a tethered adventurer beginning a spacewalk, with the Great Red Spot visible below. We also see adventurers walking across the surface ice on Jupiter's moon Europa, and who, in so doing, might also be walking above extraterrestrial microbes. (Like Saturn's moon Enceladus, astrobiologists are very focused on the possibility that Europa could harbor life.) Another group of adventurers BASE jump off of a cliff on Miranda, the smallest gravitationally-rounded moon orbiting the planet Uranus. The cliff in question, Verona Rupes, may be 5 - 10 kilometers tall. Combined with Miranda's low gravity, Wernquist estimates the jumpers could enjoy a free fall of perhaps 12 minutes before engaging a small rocket to brake their fall.

=== The "Terrarium", a hollowed-out, inhabited asteroid ===
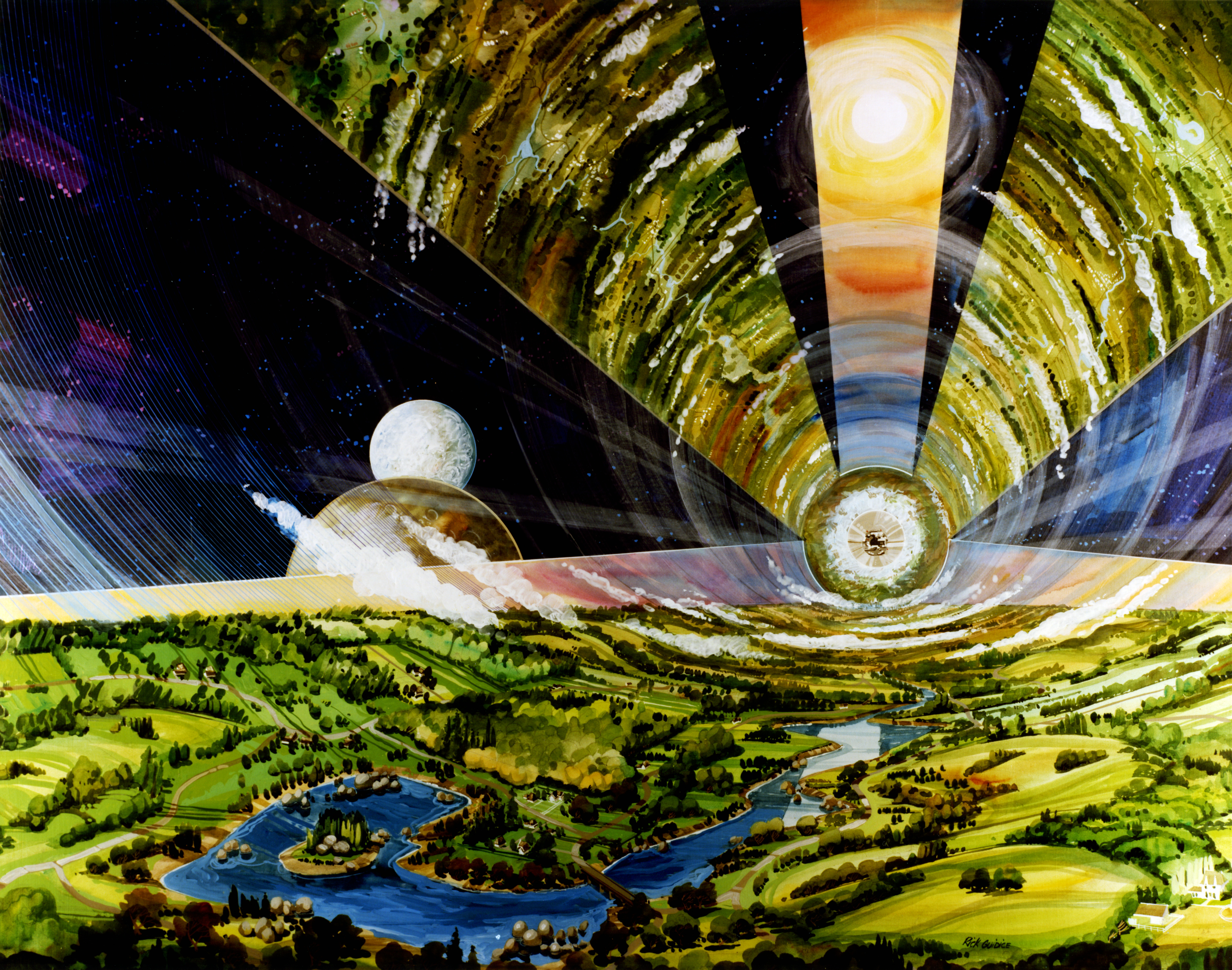
An O'Neill cylinder is somewhat similar to the hollow "Terrarium" asteroid in Wanderers: both are large hypothetical space habitats which rotate to create artificial gravity.

The film includes a dramatic illustration of possible in situ resource utilization: it depicts a hollowed-out Main Belt asteroid which could serve as a habitat for colonists and a space station for travelers who venture beyond the orbit of Mars. The interior cavity of the asteroid / habitat / station consists of a human-constructed, self-contained ecosystem, complete with pressurized, breathable air, land and soil, bodies of water, and clouds rotating around a periodic source of artificial sunlight.

Wernquist concedes that his depiction of a terraformed asteroid "is by far the most speculative part of this short film," but also says that he included it "to visualize the possibilities of human engineering and construction." He calls the asteroid a "terrarium," applying the name used by Kim Stanley Robinson in his hard science fiction novel 2312.

=== The final scene: Saturn's "ringshine" ===
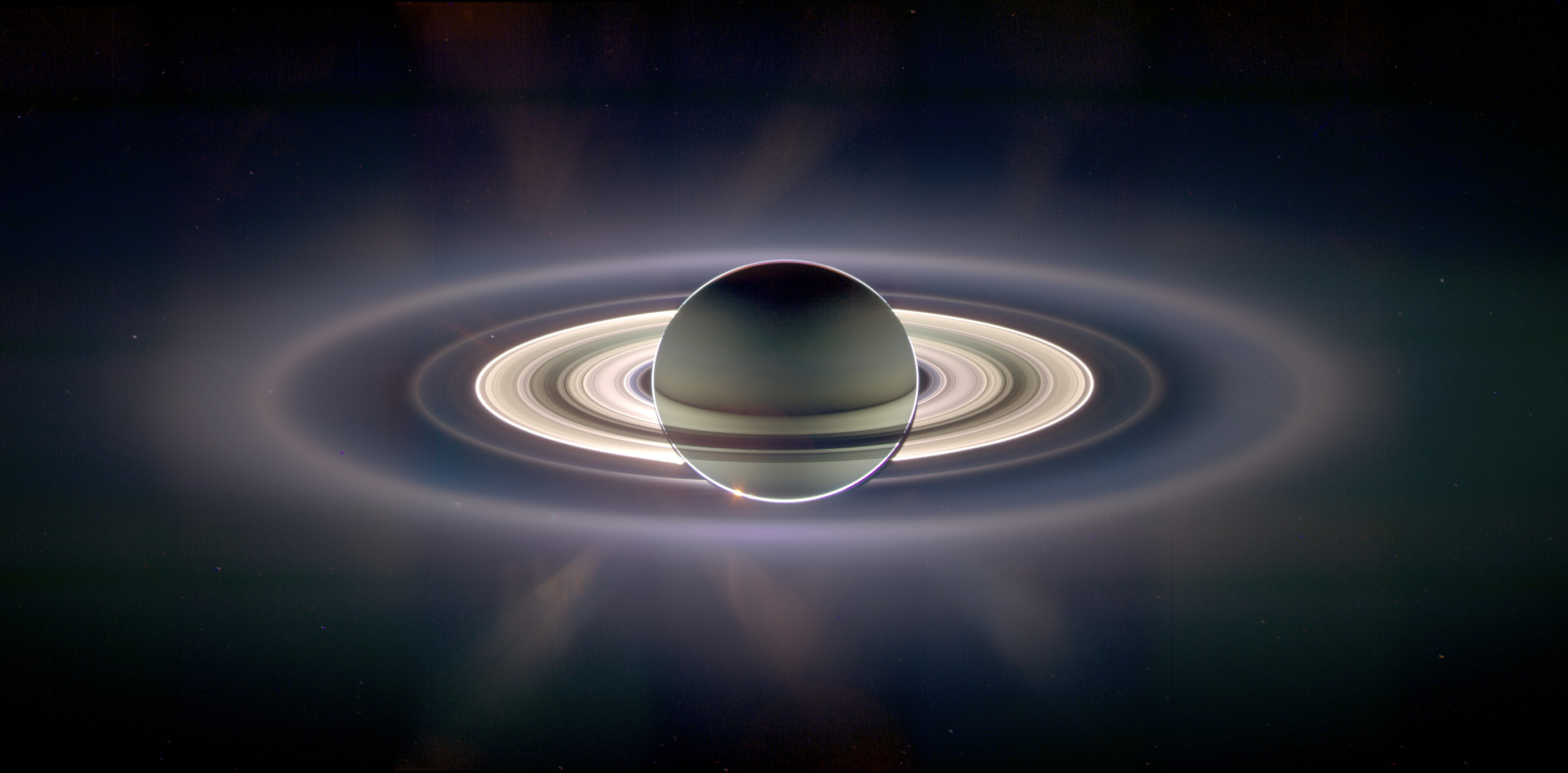
Images like this from the Cassini spacecraft (a mosaic of actual photographs with exaggerated color) inspired the final scene, "Ringshine - (Saturn)."

On Saturn, human-made airships are shown in the distant clouds, somewhat similar to the HAVOC crewed airships contemplated by NASA for a possible mission to Venus. The airships are framed by the planet's colossal rings. On one of the ships, a female explorer gazes out into the distance, wearing an insulated jacket, a fur hood, and a protective mask. As the clouds of Saturn cast reflections on her helmet, which conceals her mouth, she smiles in wonder. Carl Sagan's narration concludes as he states:

Maybe it’s a little early. Maybe the time is not quite yet. But those other worlds — promising untold opportunities — beckon. Silently, they orbit the Sun, waiting.

== Development ==
Wanderers is based on the visions of its director, Erik Wernquist, regarding humanity's future explorations of outer space. The film's visuals, animated by Wernquist, are digital recreations of real places in the Solar System; though speculative, the human technology depicted in the film derives from pre-existing scientific concepts and ideas. The film's backgrounds are built from map data and/or from photographs taken by NASA. The visuals are inspired by the works of science fiction writers Arthur C. Clarke and Kim Stanley Robinson, as well as illustrator Chesley Bonestell.

With the permission of Ann Druyan, the wife of astronomer Carl Sagan, Wernquist added excerpts of Sagan's narration of his book Pale Blue Dot throughout the film.

== Release and reception ==
The film was released on the video-sharing website Vimeo on October 11, 2014, and was officially uploaded to YouTube on August 4, 2015.

The short film has received extremely positive reviews since its release. Leonard David, a columnist on Space.com, called it a "marvelous production". Amy Shira Teitel of the website Nerdist said the film was "brilliantly realistic" and that it "might even be better than Interstellar." Dante D'Orazio of The Verge wrote that the film was a "stunningly beautiful journey across our solar system", and that while it "doesn't have a traditional story, the visuals and score (paired with Sagan's words) will make you, too, dream of the day when we become a multi-planetary species."
