= Unafraid of the Dark =

- Cosmos: A Spacetime Odyssey episode
- Episode no.: Episode 13
- Directed by: Ann Druyan
- Written by: Ann Druyan; Steven Soter
- Narrated by: Neil deGrasse Tyson
- Editing by: John Duffy; Michael O'Halloran; Eric Lea
- Production code: 113
- Original air date: June 8, 2014
- Running time: 44 minutes

Episode chronology
← Previous "The World Set Free"	Next → —

"Unafraid of the Dark" is the thirteenth and final episode of the American documentary television series Cosmos: A Spacetime Odyssey and its series finale. It premiered on June 8, 2014, on Fox and aired on June 9, 2014, on the National Geographic Channel. The episode was written by Ann Druyan and Steven Soter, and directed by Ann Druyan, making this her series directorial debut. The episode explores the mysteries of dark energy and dark matter, as well as the contributions and theories of Swiss astronomer Fritz Zwicky, who furthered our understanding of "supernovae, neutron stars and 'standard candles.'" The finale reveals a recording of life on Earth - the final message on the golden record of the space probe, Voyager. The episode ends with Carl Sagan's (host of the original Cosmos) iconic speech on Earth as the "Pale Blue Dot."

== Episode summary ==
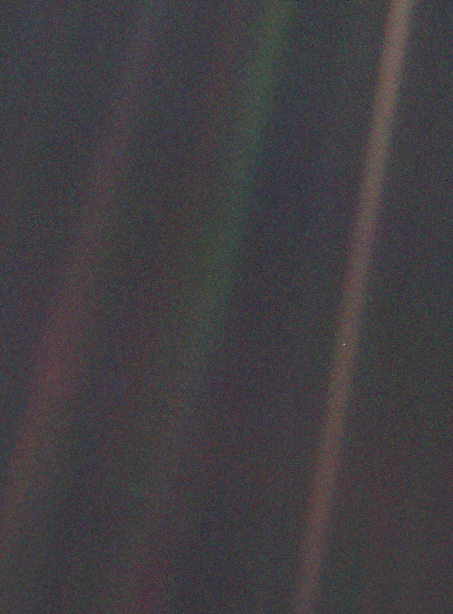
The Pale Blue Dot, taken by Voyager I in 1990 from outside the orbit of Neptune

Tyson begins the episode by noting how the destruction of the Library of Alexandria lost much of humanity's knowledge to that point. He then contrasts on the strive for humanity to continue to discover new facts about the universe and the need to not close off further discovery.

Tyson then proceeds to describe the discovery of cosmic rays by Victor Hess through high-altitude balloon trips, where radiation increased the farther one was from the surface. Swiss Astronomer Fritz Zwicky, in studying supernovae, postulated that these cosmic rays originated from these events instead of electromagnetic radiation. Zwicky would continue to study supernovae, and by looking at standard candles that they emitted, estimated the movement of the galaxies in the universe. His calculations suggested that there must be more mass in the universe than those apparent in the observable galaxies, and called this dark matter. Initially forgotten, Zwicky's theory was confirmed by the work of Vera Rubin, who observed that the rotation of stars at the edges of observable galaxies did not follow expected rotational behavior without considering dark matter. This further led to the discovery of dark energy by Edwin Hubble to account for the known rate of expansion of the universe beyond the visible and dark matter mass.

Tyson then describes the interstellar travel, using the two Voyager probes. Besides the abilities to identify several features on the planets of the Solar System, Voyager I was able to recently demonstrate the existence of the Sun's variable heliosphere which help buffer the Solar System from interstellar winds. Tyson describes Carl Sagan's role in the Voyager program, including creating the Voyager Golden Record to encapsulate humanity and Earth's position in the universe, and convincing the program directors to have Voyager I to take a picture of Earth from beyond the orbit of Neptune, creating the image of the Pale Blue Dot. Tyson concludes the series by emphasizing Sagan's message on the human condition in the vastness of the cosmos, and to encourage viewers to continue to explore and discover what else the universe has to offer.

The series concludes with the empty-seated Ship of the Imagination leaving Earth and traveling through space as Tyson looks on from planet Earth.

== Reception ==
The episode received a 1.1/3 in the 18-49 rating/share, with 3.09 million American viewers watching on Fox.
