= 2709 Sagan =

Asteroid named in honor of Carl Sagan

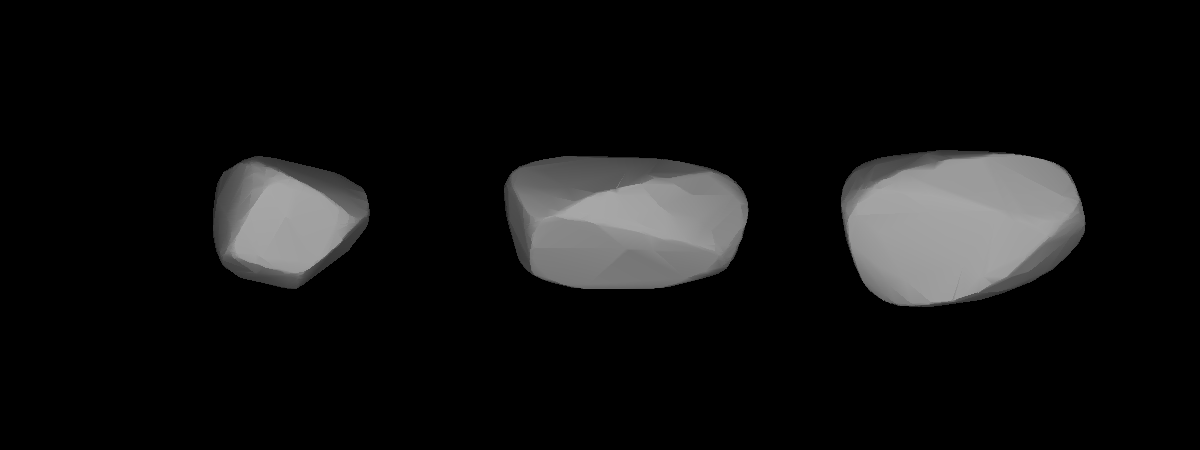
- Lightcurve-based 3D-model of Sagan

Discovery
- Discovered by: E. Bowell
- Discovery site: Anderson Mesa Stn.
- Discovery date: 21 March 1982

Designations
- Named after: Carl Sagan (astronomer and science communicator)
- Alternative designations: 1982 FH · 1951 WF_{1} 1959 CC · 1959 EA_{1} 1964 WT · 1982 FE_{2}
- Minor planet category: main-belt · Flora

Orbital characteristics
- Epoch 4 September 2017 (JD 2458000.5)
- Uncertainty parameter 0
- Observation arc: 58.15 yr (21,239 days)
- Aphelion: 2.3475 AU
- Perihelion: 2.0428 AU
- Semi-major axis: 2.1952 AU
- Eccentricity: 0.0694
- Orbital period (sidereal): 3.25 yr (1,188 days)
- Mean anomaly: 319.11°
- Mean motion: 0° 18^{m} 10.8^{s} / day
- Inclination: 2.7318°
- Longitude of ascending node: 241.13°
- Argument of perihelion: 308.48°

Physical characteristics
- Dimensions: 6.559±0.196 km 6.81 km (calculated)
- Synodic rotation period: 5.254±0.001 h 5.2557±0.0002 h (Note: Pravec, Petr (2016): lightcurve plot of (2709) Sagan with a rotation period of 5.2557±0.0002 hours with a brightness amplitude of 0.63 mag (U=3). Summary figures for (2709) Sagan at Collaborative Asteroid Lightcurve Link (CALL)); 5.2564±0.0007 h (Note: Pravec, Petr (2011): lightcurve plot of (2709) Sagan rotation period of 5.2564±0.0007 hours with a brightness amplitude of 0.09 mag (U=3). Summary figures at Collaborative Asteroid Lightcurve Link (CALL)); 5.258±0.002 h
- Geometric albedo: 0.24 (assumed); 0.259±0.043
- Spectral type: SMASS = S · S
- Absolute magnitude (H): 12.13±1.03 · 13.0

2709 Sagan, provisional designation 1982 FH, is a stony Florian asteroid from the inner regions of the asteroid belt, approximately 6.7 kilometers in diameter. It was discovered on 21 March 1982, by American astronomer Edward Bowell at Lowell's Anderson Mesa Station near Flagstaff, Arizona, and named after astronomer and science popularizer Carl Sagan.

== Orbit and classification ==
Sagan is a member of the Flora family, one of the largest families of stony asteroids. It orbits the Sun in the inner main-belt at a distance of 2.0–2.3 AU once every 3 years and 3 months (1,188 days). Its orbit has an eccentricity of 0.07 and an inclination of 3° with respect to the ecliptic.

== Physical characteristics ==
In the SMASS classification, Sagan is classified as a S-type asteroid. It has an albedo of 0.26, according to observations made by the Wide-field Infrared Survey Explorer and subsequent NEOWISE mission. The body has a rotation period between 5.254 and 5.258 hours and a brightness variation between 0.09 and 0.63 magnitude (U=3/3/3/3).

== Naming ==
This minor planet was named in honor of Carl Sagan (1934–1996), planetary scientist at Cornell University, science popularizer, editor of the journal Icarus, and founder of The Planetary Society. Sagan participated on a number of planetary space missions, including the Voyager mission to the outer planets and the Mariner 9 and Viking program to Mars.

Sagan's research encompassed studies of the greenhouse effect on Venus, the atmosphere and surface of Titan, windblown dust on Mars, and the possibility of extraterrestrial intelligent life. Sagan won the Pulitzer Prize for literature in 1978. The official naming citation was published by the Minor Planet Center on 4 August 1982 (M.P.C. 7158).

An asteroid discovered in 1998, 4970 Druyan, is named after Sagan's wife Ann Druyan and is said to be in a "wedding ring orbit" with respect to 2709 Sagan.
