= Comet (book) =

1985 book by Carl Sagan and Ann Druyan

- Cover of the first edition
- Authors: Carl Sagan; Ann Druyan
- Language: English
- Subject: Comets
- Publisher: Random House
- Publication date: 1985
- Publication place: United States
- Media type: Print (Hardcover and Paperback)
- Pages: 398
- ISBN: 978-0-394-54908-8

Comet is a 1985 popular-science book by Carl Sagan and Ann Druyan. The authors describe the scientific nature of comets, as well as their varying roles and perceptions throughout history. The evolution of human understanding of comets is also detailed, and thinkers and astronomers such as Edmond Halley, Immanuel Kant, and William Huggins are discussed.

The publication of the first edition was months ahead of the 1986 appearance of Halley's Comet. A 1997 edition includes additional material.
