= Cosmos (Sagan book) =

1980 book by Carl Sagan

- Cover of the first edition
- Author: Carl Sagan
- Cover artist: Adolf Schaller
- Language: English
- Subject: Cosmology
- Publisher: Random House; Hachette UK (1995 Ed.)
- Publication date: 1980
- Publication place: United Kingdom
- Media type: Print (Hardcover, Paperback)
- Pages: 365 (first edition); 413 (1995 edition); 396 (2013 edition)
- ISBN: 0-394-50294-9 (first edition); 978-0-3491-0703-5 (1995 edition); 978-0-375-50832-5 (2002 edition); 978-0-345-53943-4 (2013 edition)
- OCLC: 6280573
- Dewey Decimal: 520
- LC Class: QB44.2 .S235
- Preceded by: Broca's Brain: Reflections on the Romance of Science
- Followed by: Pale Blue Dot: A Vision of the Human Future in Space

Cosmos is a popular science book written by astronomer and Pulitzer Prize-winning author Carl Sagan. It was published in 1980 as a companion piece to the PBS mini-series Cosmos: A Personal Voyage with which it was co-developed and intended to complement. Each of the book's 13 illustrated chapters corresponds to one of the 13 episodes of the television series.

Just a few of the ideas explored in Cosmos include the history and mutual development of science and civilization, the nature of the Universe, human and robotic space exploration, the inner workings of the cell and the DNA that controls it, and the dangers and future implications of nuclear war. One of Sagan's main purposes for both the book and the television series was to explain complex scientific ideas in a way that anyone interested in learning can understand. Sagan also believed the television was one of the greatest teaching tools ever invented, so he wished to capitalize on his chance to educate the world.

Spurred in part by the popularity of the TV series, Cosmos spent 50 weeks on the Publishers Weekly best-sellers list and 70 weeks on the New York Times Best Seller list to become the best-selling science book ever published at the time. In 1981, it received the Hugo Award for Best Non-Fiction Book. The unprecedented success of Cosmos ushered in a dramatic increase in visibility for science-themed literature. The success of the book also served to jumpstart Sagan's literary career. The sequel to Cosmos is Pale Blue Dot: A Vision of the Human Future in Space (1994).

In 2013, a new edition of Cosmos was published, with a foreword by Ann Druyan and an essay by Neil deGrasse Tyson.

== Summary ==
Cosmos has 13 chapters, corresponding to the 13 episodes of the Cosmos television series. In the original edition, each chapter is heavily illustrated. The book covers a broad range of topics, comprising Sagan's reflections on anthropological, cosmological, biological, historical, and astronomical matters from antiquity to contemporary times. Sagan reiterates his position on extraterrestrial life—that the magnitude of the universe permits the existence of thousands of alien civilizations, but no credible evidence exists to demonstrate that such life has ever visited earth. Sagan explores 15 billion years of cosmic evolution and the development of science and civilization. He traces the origins of knowledge and the scientific method, mixing science and philosophy, and speculates about the future of science. He also discusses the underlying premises of science by providing biographical anecdotes about many prominent scientists, placing their contributions in the broader context of the development of modern science.

The book, like the television series, contains a number of Cold War undertones including subtle references to self-destruction and the futility of the arms race.

== Popularity ==
Shortly after release, Cosmos became the best-selling science book ever published in the English language, and was the first science book to sell more than half a million copies. Though spurred in part by the popularity of the television series, Cosmos became a best-seller by its own regard, reaching hundreds of thousands of readers. It was only surpassed in the late 1980s by Stephen Hawking's A Brief History of Time (1988). Cosmos spent 50 weeks on the Publishers Weekly best-seller's list, and 70 weeks on the New York Times Best Seller list. Cosmos sold over 900,000 copies while on these lists, and continued popularity has allowed Cosmos to sell about five million copies internationally. Shortly after Cosmos was published, Sagan received a $2 million advance for the novel Contact. This was the largest release given for an unwritten fiction book at the time. The success of Cosmos made Sagan "wealthy as well as famous." It also ushered in a dramatic increase in visibility for science books, opening up new options and readership for the previously fledgling genre. Science historian Bruce Lewenstein of Cornell University noted that among science books "Cosmos marked the moment that something different was clearly going on."

After the success of Cosmos, Sagan turned into an early scientific celebrity. He appeared on many television programs, wrote a regular column for Parade, and worked to continually advance the popularity of the science genre.

Lewenstein also noted the power of the book as a recruitment tool. Along with Microbe Hunters and The Double Helix, he described Cosmos as one of the "books that people cite as 'Hey, the reason I'm a scientist is because I read that book'." Particularly in astronomy and physics, he said, the book inspired many people to become scientists. Sagan has also been called the "most successful popularizing scientist of our time," for his ability to draw such a large and varied audience.

The popularity of Sagan's Cosmos has been referenced in arguments supporting increased space exploration spending. Sagan's book was also referenced in Congress by Arthur C. Clarke in a speech promoting an end to Cold War anti-ICBM spending, instead arguing that the anti-ICBM budget would be better spent on Mars exploration.

== Critical reception ==
Reception for Sagan's work was generally positive. In The New York Times Book Review, novelist James Michener praised Cosmos as "a cleverly written, imaginatively illustrated summary of [Sagan's]... ruminations about our universe... His style is iridescent, with lights flashing upon unexpected juxtapositions of thought." The American astrophysicist Neil deGrasse Tyson described "Cosmos" as something "more than Carl Sagan". David Whitehouse of the British Broadcasting Corporation went so far as to say that "there is not a book on astronomy – in fact not one on science – that comes close to the eloquence and intellectual sweep of Cosmos... If we send just one book to grace the libraries of distant worlds..., let it be Cosmos." Kirkus Reviews described the book as "Sagan at his best." Cornell News Service characterized it as "an overview of how science and civilization grew up together." In 1981, Cosmos received the Hugo Award for Best Non-Fiction Book.

== See also ==
- Kosmos by Alexander von Humboldt; like Cosmos, a book that discusses the then known universe and humankind's place in it
