= The Lost Worlds of Planet Earth =

- Cosmos: A Spacetime Odyssey episode
- Episode no.: Season 1 Episode 9
- Directed by: Brannon Braga
- Written by: Ann Druyan; Steven Soter
- Narrated by: Neil deGrasse Tyson
- Editing by: John Duffy; Michael O'Halloran; Eric Lea
- Production code: 110
- Original air date: May 4, 2014
- Running time: 45 minutes

Guest appearance
- Amanda Seyfried as Marie Tharp

Episode chronology
| ← Previous "Sisters of the Sun" | Next → "The Electric Boy" |

"The Lost Worlds of Planet Earth" is the ninth episode of the American documentary television series Cosmos: A Spacetime Odyssey. It premiered on May 4, 2014 on Fox, and aired on May 5, 2014 on National Geographic Channel. The episode was directed by Brannon Braga, written by Ann Druyan and Steven Soter, and featured the voice of Amanda Seyfried as geologist Marie Tharp. The episode explores the history of the Earth starting with the period of the Late Heavy Bombardment, approximately "3.8 to 4.1 billion years ago during which the Moon, Mercury, Venus, and the Earth were battered by space debris." Host Neil deGrasse Tyson then delves into the biography of the Earth, expressed "in its continents, oceans and life living on and in them, saying 'the past is another planet,'" alluding to how plate tectonics have shaped the Earth over millions of years.

The episode received a 1.6/5 in the 18-49 rating/share, with 4.08 million American viewers watching on Fox.

== Episode summary ==
A map of Earth's plate tectonics

This episode explores the palaeogeography of Earth over millions of years, and its impact on the development of life on the planet. Tyson starts by explaining that the lignin-rich trees evolved in the Carboniferous period about 300 million years ago, were not edible by species at the time and would instead fall over and become carbon-rich coal. Some 50 million years later, near the end of the Permian period, volcanic activity would burn the carbonaceous matter, releasing carbon dioxide and acidic components, creating a sudden greenhouse gas effect that warmed the oceans and released methane from the ocean beds, all leading towards the Permian–Triassic extinction event, killing 90% of the species on Earth.

Tyson then explains on the nature of plate tectonics that would shape the landmasses of the world. Tyson explains how scientists like Abraham Ortelius hypothesized the idea that land masses may have been connected in the past, Alfred Wegener who hypothesized the idea of a super-continent Pangaea and continental drift despite the prevailing idea of flooded land-bridges at the time, and Bruce C. Heezen and Marie Tharp who discovered the Mid-Atlantic Ridge that supported the theory of plate tectonics. Tyson describes how the landmasses of the Earth lay atop the mantle, which moves due to the motion and heat of the Earth's outer and inner core.

Tyson moves on to explain the asteroid impact that initiated the Cretaceous–Paleogene extinction event, leaving small mammals as the dominant species on Earth. Tyson proceeds to describe more recent geologic events such as the formation of the Mediterranean Sea due to the breaking of the natural dam at the Strait of Gibraltar, and how the geologic formation of the Isthmus of Panama broke the free flow of the Atlantic Ocean into the Pacific, causing large-scale climate change such as turning the bulk of Africa from lush grasslands into arid plains and further influencing tree-climbing mammals' evolution towards walking long distances on two legs and using tools. Tyson further explains how the influence of other planets in the Solar System have small effects on the Earth's spin and tilt, creating the various ice ages, and how these changes influenced early human's nomadic behavior. Tyson explains that the climate then stabilized to become the current interglacial period, and finally that this stable period risks to be prematurely ended by the human activity of burning fossil fuels, which will threaten our environment and our ability to feed ourselves. Tyson concludes the episode by noting how Earth's landmasses are expected to change in the future, and postulates what may be the next great extinction event, and that there is a chance that our story will end with it.

== Reception ==
The episode's premiere on Fox brought a 1.6/5 in the 18-49 rating/share, with an audience of 4.08 million American viewers. It placed fourth and last in its timeslot behind The Good Wife, Resurrection, and Believe; and thirteenth out of seventeenth for the night.

== See also ==
- Geological history of the Earth
- Plate tectonics
