= Sasha Sagan =

American writer, TV producer and filmmaker (born 1982)

- Born: Alexandra Sagan; 1982 (age 43–44); Ithaca, New York, U.S
- Education: New York University
- Occupations: Author, screenwriter, producer, podcaster
- Notable work: For Small Creatures Such as We
- Spouse: Jonathan Noel (m. 2013)
- Children: 2
- Parents: Carl Sagan (father); Ann Druyan (mother)
- Relatives: Dorion Sagan (half-brother); Nick Sagan (half-brother)

Sasha Sagan promoting her book, "For Small Creatures Such as We" at the Sanctuary Events Center in Fargo, ND

Alexandra "Sasha" Sagan (born 1982) is an American author, television producer, filmmaker, and podcaster.

== Early life and education ==
Sagan is the daughter of the writer Ann Druyan and astronomer Carl Sagan.

She is a graduate of New York University.

== Career ==
Sagan co-wrote the screenplay of the short film Bastard (2010) with Kirsten Dunst. The film was screened at the Tribeca Film Festival.

She played the role of Carl Sagan's mother in Cosmos: Possible Worlds in 2020.

She has written for New York magazine.

== Book ==
Sagan's book For Small Creatures Such as We was published in 2019.

== Personal life ==
Sagan lives in Boston with her husband, Jonathan Noel, and their daughter and son. They were married in Ithaca, New York in September 2013.
