= Cosmos: Possible Worlds =

2020 American science documentary television series

- Genre: Science documentary
- Based on: Cosmos: A Personal Voyage by: Carl Sagan; Ann Druyan; Steven Soter
- Written by: Ann Druyan; Brannon Braga
- Directed by: Ann Druyan; Brannon Braga
- Presented by: Neil deGrasse Tyson
- Composer: Alan Silvestri
- Country of origin: United States
- Original language: English
- No. of episodes: 13

Production
- Executive producers: Seth MacFarlane; Ann Druyan; Brannon Braga; Jason Clark
- Producers: Kara Vallow; Joseph Micucci
- Cinematography: Karl Walter Lindenlaub
- Running time: 44 minutes
- Production companies: Cosmos Studios; Fuzzy Door Productions

Original release
- Network: National Geographic; Fox
- Release: March 9 – April 20, 2020

Related
- Cosmos: A Personal Voyage (1980); Cosmos: A Spacetime Odyssey (2014)

Cosmos: Possible Worlds is a 2020 American science documentary television series that premiered on March 9, 2020, on National Geographic. The series is a follow-up to the 2014 television series Cosmos: A Spacetime Odyssey, which followed the original Cosmos: A Personal Voyage series presented by Carl Sagan on PBS in 1980. The series is presented by astrophysicist Neil deGrasse Tyson, written, directed, and executive-produced by Ann Druyan and Brannon Braga, with other executive producers being Seth MacFarlane and Jason Clark.

The series consists of 13 episodes that were broadcast over seven weeks. The series had its broadcast television premiere on Fox on September 22, 2020. Braga explains that "Possible Worlds refers to planets far, far away, but also ... the future as a possible world."

== Development and production ==
On January 13, 2018, it was announced that another season titled Cosmos: Possible Worlds would debut in 2019 on Fox and National Geographic channels, to be hosted by Neil deGrasse Tyson and executive produced by Ann Druyan, Seth MacFarlane, Brannon Braga, and Jason Clark. The studio portions were filmed at Santa Fe Studios with plans for location shooting in the Pacific Northwest, Europe, and Asia.

This 13-episode sequel series was slated to premiere on March 3, 2019, on Fox, and the following day on National Geographic. However, from December 2018 through February 2019, Tyson became the subject of sexual harassment allegations. Both National Geographic and Fox stated they would investigate these allegations, and indefinitely postponed the premiere of Cosmos on February 15, 2019. National Geographic and Fox completed their investigation without stating the results of it on March 15, 2019, and affirmed that Cosmos would resume at some point.

The series premiered in early March 2020 in the United States on the National Geographic Channel and was scheduled to air on Fox afterwards, as well as in 172 other countries.

Druyan expects the series to be inspiring, with a strong emphasis on a hopeful future, and she hopes that the series will help correct antiscience rhetoric and policies. Druyan also stated that, due to current events, she was motivated "by a greater sense of urgency" when writing the new series as compared to the previous series. Regarding a line she wrote for episode 1: "Our ship of the imagination is propelled by twin engines of skepticism and wonder" Druyan said:

I'm very proud of that line, because that's the point. You don't have to have one at the expense of the other … an equal measure of both always. For me, science and skepticism were the means to have the greatest spiritual experiences of my life. And every one of them was about having a somewhat deeper sense of the romance of being alive in the Cosmos, and the beauty of nature. The universe that science reveals is so much more amazing than our ancestors could ever have anticipated, because they had never seen the curtain of darkness peeled away … and actually seen the vastness and began to know something of just how big it all is."

The tone of the series has been described as optimistic. Tyson said the series is "a very hopeful vision of what we can do if we're enlightened enough." Druyan has expressed the hope that "If we start listening to what the scientists are telling us, we can get out of this horrible mess that we've created for ourselves." Druyan was awarded the National Geographic Further Award by the 2020 Sun Valley Film Festival for her work on Cosmos.

== Cast ==
- Neil deGrasse Tyson as Himself / Host
- Seth MacFarlane as United States President Harry S. Truman
- Patrick Stewart as astronomer William Herschel
- Viggo Mortensen as Soviet plant geneticist Nikolai Vavilov
- Judd Hirsch as J. Robert Oppenheimer, the father of the atomic bomb
- Sasha Sagan (daughter of Ann Druyan and Carl Sagan) as Rachel Gruber Sagan, Carl Sagan's mother

== Episodes ==
No.	Title	Directed by	Written by	Original release date	Prod. code	U.S. viewers (millions)
1	"Ladder to the Stars"	Brannon Braga	Ann Druyan	March 9, 2020	YNF201	0.535
An adventure spanning billions of years into the evolution of life and consciousness. A visit to a 100,000-year-old laboratory. The story of the change in life-style that radically altered human existence and the life of the heretic who found god in the book of nature, opening our way to the stars.
2	"The Fleeting Grace of the Habitable Zone"	Ann Druyan	Ann Druyan and Brannon Braga	March 9, 2020	YNF211	0.364
There is no refuge from change in the cosmos. There will come a time in the life of the Sun when Earth will no longer be a home for us. The story of our ancestors who rose to a comparable challenge and a long-term vision of our future on other worlds.
3	"Lost City of Life"	Brannon Braga	Ann Druyan and Brannon Braga	March 16, 2020	YNF203	0.421
A new vision of genesis at the bottom of the blood red sea of the infant Earth. And the story of the man who found the first clues to life's beginning in a green jewel. As he searched for life's origin, he risked his own, daring to toy with his Nazi tormentors.
4	"Vavilov"	Ann Druyan	Ann Druyan and Brannon Braga	March 16, 2020	YNF204	0.444
In the first half of the 20th century pioneering geneticist Nikolai Vavilov traveled 5 continents assembling a treasury of the worlds seeds. He dreamed that science could be the means to end hunger. His refusal to tell a scientific lie cost him his life. The heroism of his colleagues and its direct impact on your life is one of the most stirring stories in the history of science.
5	"The Cosmic Connectome"	Ann Druyan	Ann Druyan and Brannon Braga	March 23, 2020	YNF205	0.356
A voyage of discovery through the evolution of consciousness with stops in ancient Greece, a visit to the largest life form on Earth, into the poignant dream of an abandoned orphan that opened the way to our understanding of the architecture of thought and beyond to a vision of a galactic network of thought.
6	"The Man of a Trillion Worlds"	Ann Druyan	Ann Druyan and Brannon Braga & André Bormanis	March 23, 2020	YNF206	0.401
A child lies on the rug of a tenement dreaming of interstellar adventures. At the dawn of the space age, a young Carl Sagan's career is forged in the clash of his mentors, two scientific titans. Sagan goes on to realize his childhood dreams, to carry their research forward and communicate its significance to the whole world.
7	"The Search for Intelligent Life on Earth"	Brannon Braga	Ann Druyan and Brannon Braga	March 30, 2020	YNF207	0.457
A revelation of the hidden underground network that is a collaboration of four kingdoms of life, and a true first contact story between humans and beings who communicate in a symbolic language and have maintained a representative democracy for many tens of millions of years.
8	"The Sacrifice of Cassini"	Ann Druyan	Ann Druyan and Brannon Braga	March 30, 2020	YNF208	0.520
The mysterious untold story of the scientist who figured out how to go the Moon while fighting for his life in a WWI trench. He wrote a letter to fifty years in the future. It made the Apollo Mission possible. And the saga of the twenty-year long odyssey of a robotic explorer ordered to commit suicide on another world.
9	"Magic Without Lies"	Brannon Braga	Ann Druyan and Brannon Braga	April 6, 2020	YNF209	0.384
In the counterintuitive realm of quantum mechanics, light can be two contradictory things, and somehow - no one knows how - an unseen observer can alter the nature of reality. The man who stumbled on this hole in reality and the still- unfolding technological revolution that it made possible.
10	"A Tale of Two Atoms"	Brannon Braga	Based on a story by : Carl Sagan, Ann Druyan and Steven Soter; Teleplay by : Ann Druyan and Brannon Braga	April 6, 2020	YNF210	0.407
Two atoms from different parts of the universe meet on a small planet. How a deadly embrace between science and state altered the fate of the world, and a gripping cautionary tale of others who grew used to living in the shadow of grave danger until it killed them all except one.
11	"Shadows of Forgotten Ancestors"	Brannon Braga	Inspired by "Shadows of Forgotten Ancestors" by : Carl Sagan and Ann Druyan; Teleplay by : Ann Druyan and Brannon Braga	April 13, 2020	YNF202	0.390
From the birth of the devil in ancient Persia, where a beloved family dog becomes a seething beast to a searing story of saintliness among macaque monkeys, an exploration of human potential for change. It concludes with the story of how one of history's greatest monsters was transformed into one of its shining lights.
12	"Coming of Age in the Anthropocene"	Ann Druyan	Ann Druyan and Brannon Braga	April 13, 2020	YNF212	0.375
What kind of world can a child born in 2020 expect to grow up in? And when did our slide into planet-wide environmental destruction begin? The possible world that awaits our baby girl into her 20s: one darkened by our refusal to face the real and mounting challenges we face but concluding with a message of hope.
13	"Seven Wonders of the New World"	Brannon Braga	Ann Druyan	April 20, 2020	YNF213	N/A
The young Carl Sagan and Neil Tyson first discovered their passion for science at the NY World's Fairs of the past. We visit the dazzling Pavilions of the 2039 NY World's Fair, where problems we currently think intractable have been plausibly solved through public commitment and scientific imagination. And our baby is a woman now, with a baby of her own and a future bright with possibilities.

== Book ==
Druyan authored a companion book to the series released in February 2020. As was the case with the original Cosmos book, it is divided into thirteen chapters, mostly titled after the episodes, with a variant sequence.

== Possible sequel ==
When asked if she was planning another season of Cosmos, Druyan said "Yes! I very much have season four in mind, and I know what it's going to be. And I even know some of the stories that I want to tell in it. But I'm going to take a little bit of a break, thanks to the coronavirus, so is everyone else for a little while. But I do intend to do a fourth season."
