= Shadows of Forgotten Ancestors (Sagan and Druyan book) =

1992 book by Carl Sagan and Ann Druyan

Shadows of Forgotten Ancestors: A Search for Who We Are
- Cover of the first edition
- Authors: Carl Sagan; Ann Druyan
- Language: English
- Subject: History of life
- Publisher: Random House (1992); Ballantine Books (1993)
- Publication date: 1992 (Random House); 1993 (Ballantine Books)
- Publication place: United States
- Media type: Print (hardback and paperback)
- Pages: 528
- ISBN: 0-394-53481-6
- OCLC: 28866374
- Followed by: Pale Blue Dot

Shadows of Forgotten Ancestors: A Search for Who We Are is a 1992 book by Carl Sagan and Ann Druyan.

== Overview ==
The authors give a summary account of the evolutionary history of life on Earth, with particular focus upon certain traits central to human nature and the discussion of where their precursors began to develop in other species. In the final chapters, they examine primates in detail, comparing the details between anatomically modern humans and the extant species most closely related to them.

The book was the basis for an episode of the same name in the 2020 series Cosmos: Possible Worlds, written by Druyan and Brannon Braga.

== Publication data ==
- Sagan, Carl; Druyan, Ann (1992). Shadows of Forgotten Ancestors: A Search for Who We Are (1st ed.). New York: Random House. ISBN 0-394-53481-6.
- Sagan, Carl; Druyan, Ann (1993). Shadows of Forgotten Ancestors: A Search for Who We Are (1st ed.). New York: Ballantine Books. ISBN 0-345-38472-5.
