= Pale Blue Dot (book) =

1994 book by Carl Sagan

Pale Blue Dot: A Vision of the Human Future in Space
- Cover of the first edition
- Author: Carl Sagan
- Language: English
- Subject: Astronomy
- Publisher: Random House
- Publication date: 1994; 32 years ago
- Publication place: United States
- Media type: Print (hardcover and paperback)
- Pages: 429
- ISBN: 0-679-43841-6
- OCLC: 30736355
- Dewey Decimal: 919.9/04 20
- LC Class: QB500.262 .S24 1994
- Preceded by: Shadows of Forgotten Ancestors
- Followed by: The Demon-Haunted World

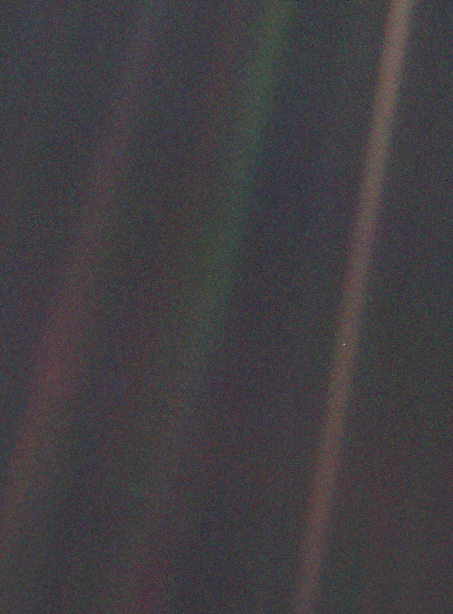
The original 1990 Pale Blue Dot photograph in which Earth is seen from the Voyager 1 space probe (nearly half-way up the righthand band of light)

Pale Blue Dot: A Vision of the Human Future in Space is a 1994 book by the astronomer Carl Sagan. It is the sequel to Sagan's 1980 book Cosmos and was inspired by the famous 1990 Pale Blue Dot photograph, for which Sagan provides a poignant description. In the book, Sagan mixes philosophy about the human place in the universe with a description of the current knowledge about the Solar System. He also details a human vision for the future.

In 2023, the audiobook of Pale Blue Dot, read by Sagan, was selected by the Library of Congress for preservation in the United States National Recording Registry as being "culturally, historically, or aesthetically significant."

== Summary ==
The first part of the book examines the claims made throughout history that Earth and the human species are unique. Sagan proposes two reasons for the persistence of the idea of a geocentric, or Earth-centered universe: pride in human existence, and the threat of torturing those who dissented from it, particularly during the time of the Roman Inquisition. However, he also admits that the scientific tools to prove the Earth orbited the Sun were (until the last few hundred years) not accurate enough to measure effects such as parallax, making it difficult for astronomers to prove that the geocentric theory was false.

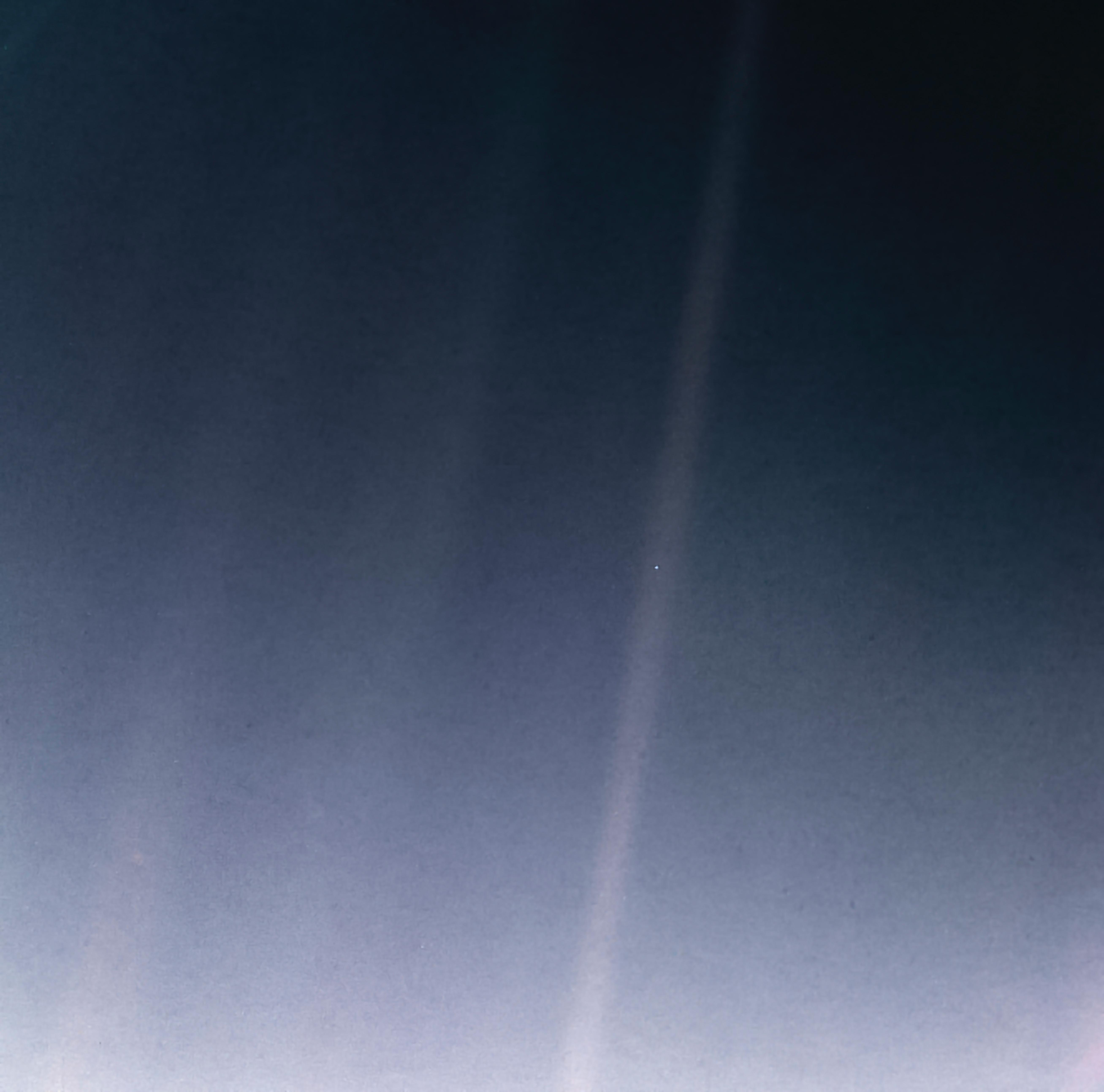
Pale Blue Dot as republished by NASA in 2020 for the images' 30th anniversary. Using modern image-processing software, the brightness and colors were balanced to enhance the area containing the Earth.

After saying that society has gained humility from understanding that Earth is not literally the center of the universe, Sagan embarks on an exploration of the entire Solar System. He begins with an account of the Voyager program, in which he was a participating scientist. He describes the difficulty of working with the low light levels at distant planets, and the mechanical and computer problems which beset the twin spacecraft as they aged, and which could not always be diagnosed and fixed remotely. Sagan then examines each one of the major planets, as well as some of the moons—including Titan, Triton, and Miranda—focusing on whether life is possible at the frontiers of the Solar System.

Sagan argues that studying other planets provides context for understanding the Earth—and protecting humanity's only home planet from environmental catastrophe. He believes that NASA's decision to cut back exploration of the Moon after the Apollo program was a short-sighted decision, despite its expense and declining popularity among the American public. Sagan says future exploration of space should focus on ways to protect Earth and to extend human habitation beyond it. The book was published the same year comet Shoemaker-Levy 9 crashed into Jupiter, an event Sagan uses to highlight the danger Earth faces from the occasional asteroid or comet large enough to cause substantial damage if it were to hit Earth. He says there must be political will to track large extraterrestrial objects and mitigate their significant risks to humanity. Sagan argues that in order to save the human race, space colonization and terraforming should be utilized.

Later in the book, Sagan's wife, Ann Druyan, challenges readers to pick one of the other planetary dots photographed and featured in the book, and imagine that there are inhabitants on that world who believe that the universe was created solely for themselves. She shared Sagan's belief that humans are not as important as they think they are.

The first edition of the book includes an extensive list of illustrations and photographs, much of it taken from public archives of information released by NASA.

== See also ==
- Anthropocentrism
- Earthrise, 1968 Apollo 8 photograph
- The Blue Marble, 1972 Apollo 17 photograph
- Wanderers (2014 film)
