= Ann Druyan =

American author and producer (born 1949)

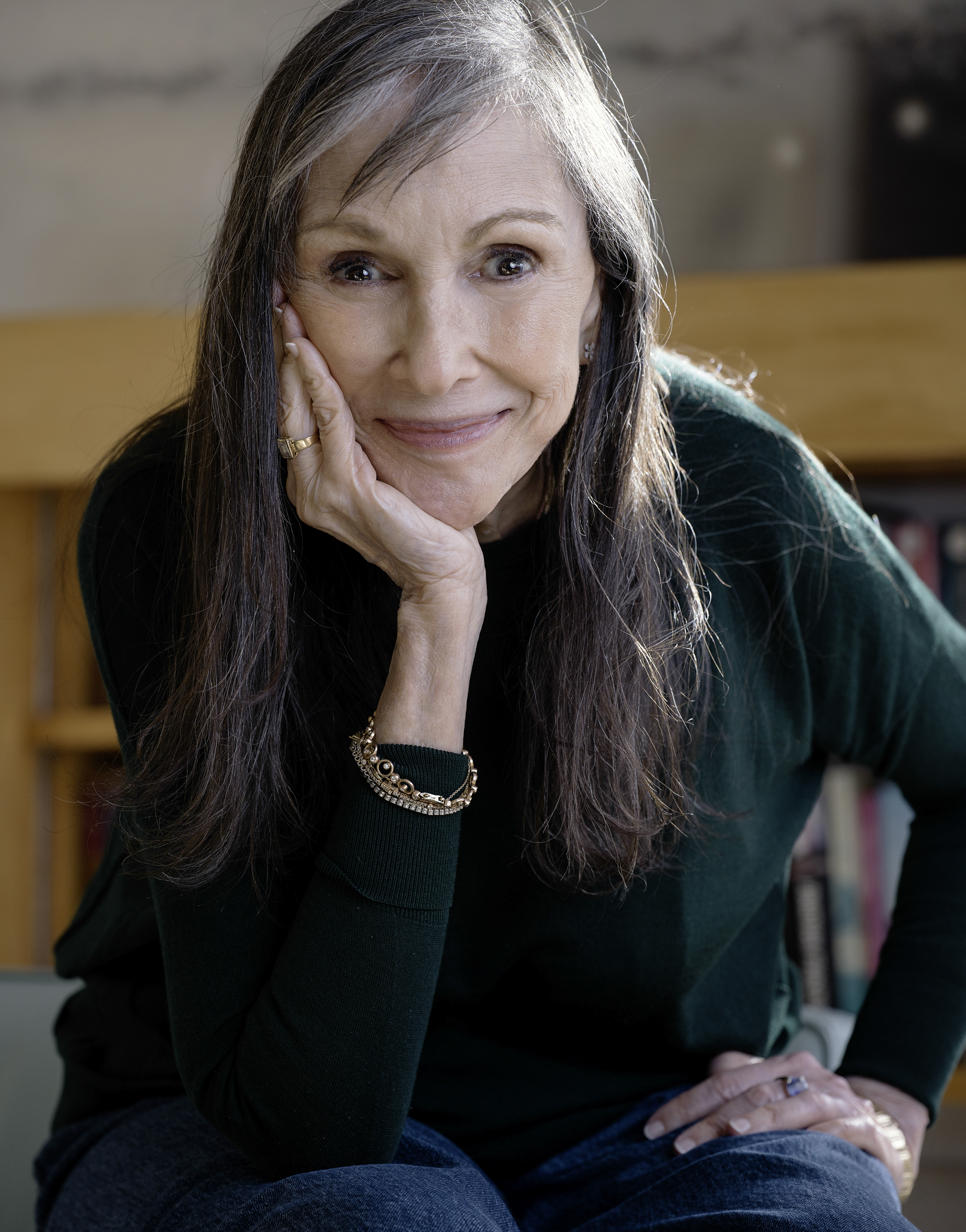
- Druyan at her home in 2025
- Born: June 13, 1949 (age 77); New York City, U.S.
- Known for: Author, activist, producer
- Spouse: Carl Sagan (m. 1981; died 1996)
- Children: 2, including Sasha

Ann Druyan (/driːˈæn/ dree-ANN; born June 13, 1949) is an American documentary producer and director specializing in the communication of science. She co-wrote the 1980 PBS documentary series Cosmos, hosted by Carl Sagan, whom she married in 1981. She was the creator, producer, and writer of the 2014 sequel, Cosmos: A Spacetime Odyssey and its sequel series, Cosmos: Possible Worlds, as well as the book of the same name. She directed episodes of both series.

In the late 1970s, she became the creative director of NASA's Voyager Interstellar Message Project, which produced the golden discs affixed to both the Voyager 1 and Voyager 2 spacecraft. She also published a novel, A Famous Broken Heart, in 1977, and later co-wrote several best selling non-fiction books with Sagan.

== Early life and education ==
Ann Druyan was born in Queens, New York, the daughter of Pearl A. (née Goldsmith) and Harry Druyan, who co-owned a knitwear firm. Her family was Jewish.

Druyan's early interest in math and science was, in her word, "derailed" when a junior high-school teacher ridiculed a question she asked about the universality of π. "I raised my hand and said, 'You mean this applies to every circle in the universe?', and the teacher told me not to ask stupid questions. And there I was having this religious experience, and she made me feel like such a fool. I was completely flummoxed from then on until after college." Druyan characterized her three years at New York University as "disastrous", and it was only after she left school without graduating that she discovered the pre-Socratic philosophers and began educating herself, thus leading to a renewed interest in science.

== Career ==
In the late 1970s, Druyan became the creative director of NASA's Voyager Interstellar Message Project. As creative director, Druyan worked with a team to design a complex message, including music and images, for possible alien civilizations. These golden phonograph records affixed to the Voyager 1 and Voyager 2 spacecraft are now beyond the outermost planets of the Solar System, and Voyager 1 has entered interstellar space. Both records have a projected shelf life of one billion years.

Druyan's role on the project was discussed on the July 8, 2018, 60 Minutes segment "The Little Spacecraft That Could". In the segment, Druyan explained her insistence that Chuck Berry's "Johnny B. Goode" be included on the Golden Record, saying: "...Johnny B. Goode, rock and roll, was the music of motion, of moving, getting to someplace you've never been before, and the odds are against you, but you want to go. That was Voyager." The segment also discussed Sagan's suggestion, in 1990, that Voyager 1 turn its cameras back towards Earth to take a series of photographs showing the planets of the Solar System. The shots, showing Earth from a distance of 3.7 billion miles as a small point of bluish light, became the basis for Sagan's famous "Pale Blue Dot" passage, first published in Pale Blue Dot: A Vision of the Human Future in Space (1994).

During that time, Druyan also co-wrote (with Carl Sagan and Steven Soter) the 1980 PBS documentary series Cosmos, hosted by Carl Sagan. The thirteen-part series covered a wide range of scientific subjects, including the origin of life and a perspective of humans place in the universe. It was highly acclaimed, and became the most widely watched series in the history of American public television at that time. The series won two Emmys and a Peabody Award, and has since been broadcast in more than 60 countries and seen by over 500 million people. A book was also published to accompany the series. As of 2009, it is still the most widely watched PBS series in the world. Several revised versions of the series were later broadcast; one version, telecast after Sagan's death, opens with Druyan paying tribute to her late husband and the impact of Cosmos over the years.

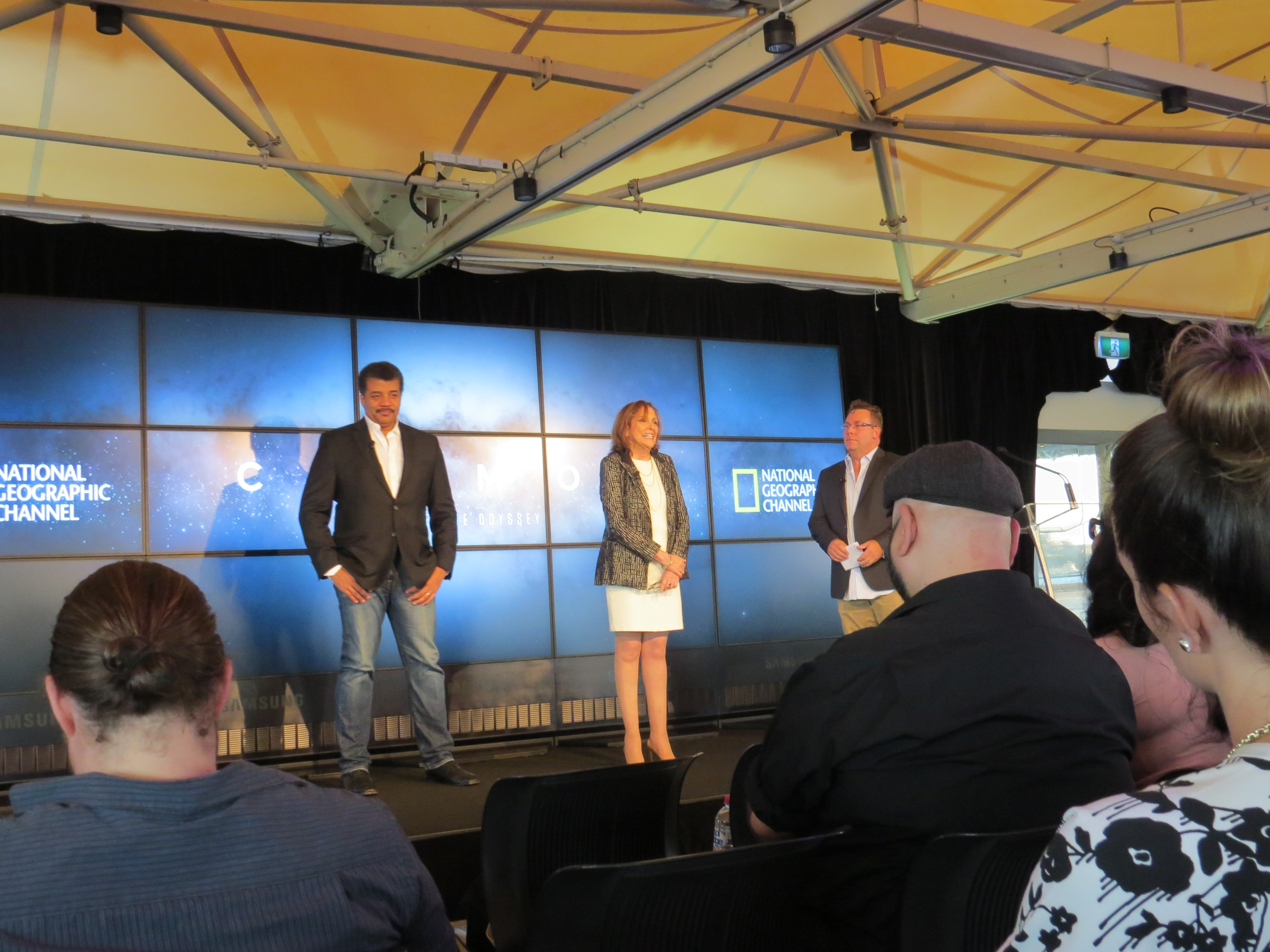
Neil deGrasse Tyson and Ann Druyan in Sydney

Druyan wrote and produced the 1987 PBS NOVA episode "Confessions of a Weaponeer" on the life of President Eisenhower's Science Advisor George Kistiakowsky.

In 2000, Druyan, together with Steve Soter, co-wrote Passport to the Universe, the inaugural planetarium show for the Rose Center for Earth and Space at the American Natural History Museum's Hayden Planetarium. The attraction is narrated by Tom Hanks. Druyan and Soter also co-wrote The Search for Life: Are We Alone, narrated by Harrison Ford, which also debuted at the Hayden's Rose Center.

In 2000, Druyan co-founded Cosmos Studios, Inc, with Joseph Firmage. As CEO of Cosmos Studios, Druyan produces science-based entertainment for all media. In addition to Cosmos: A SpaceTime Odyssey, Cosmos Studios has produced Cosmic Africa, Lost Dinosaurs of Egypt, and the Emmy-nominated documentary Cosmic Journey: The Voyager Interstellar Mission and Message. In 2009, she distributed a series of podcasts called At Home in the Cosmos with Annie Druyan, in which she described her works, the life of her husband, Carl Sagan, and their marriage.

Druyan is credited, with Carl Sagan, as the co-creator and co-producer of the 1997 feature film Contact.

In 2011, it was announced that Druyan would executive produce, co-write, and be one of the episodic directors for a sequel to Cosmos: A Personal Voyage, to be called Cosmos: A Spacetime Odyssey, which began airing in March 2014. Episodes premiered on Fox and also aired on National Geographic Channel on the following night. At the time of its release, Fox gave the series the largest global rollout of a television series ever, debuting it in 180 countries. The premiere episode was shown across nine of Fox's cable properties in addition to the broadcast network in a "roadblock" style premiere. The series went on to become the most-watched series ever for National Geographic Channel International, with at least some part of the 13-episode series watched by 135 million people, including 45 million in the U.S.

In March 2020, a third season of Cosmos, named Cosmos: Possible Worlds, for which Druyan was executive producer, writer, and director, premiered on National Geographic. Druyan also said: "I very much have season four in mind, and I know what it's going to be. And I even know some of the stories that I want to tell in it."

=== Writing ===
Druyan's first novel, A Famous Broken Heart, was published in 1977.

Druyan co-wrote six New York Times bestsellers with Carl Sagan, including: Comet, Shadows of Forgotten Ancestors, and The Demon-Haunted World. She is co-author, along with Carl Sagan, F. D. Drake, Timothy Ferris, Jon Lomberg and Linda Salzman Sagan, of Murmurs Of Earth: The Voyager Interstellar Record. She also wrote the updated introduction to Sagan's book The Cosmic Connection and the epilogue of Billions and Billions. She wrote the introduction to, and edited The Varieties of Scientific Experience, published from Sagan's 1985 Gifford lectures.

In February 2020, Druyan published Cosmos: Possible Worlds, a companion volume to the television series of the same name, which premiered in March 2020.

=== Work in science ===
Druyan is a fellow of the Committee for the Scientific Investigation of Claims of the Paranormal (CSICOP).

Druyan served as program director of the first solar-sail deep-space mission, Cosmos 1, launched on a Russian ICBM in 2005.

Druyan is involved in multiple Breakthrough Initiatives. With Frank Drake, Druyan is the co-chair of Breakthrough Message and also a member of Breakthrough Starshot.

She is a member of the advisory board of The Carl Sagan Institute.

== Activism ==
Druyan has for many years been a vocal advocate for nuclear disarmament. She was arrested three times at the Mercury, Nevada nuclear test site during Mikhail Gorbachev's unilateral moratorium on underground nuclear testing, with which President Ronald Reagan did not cooperate. This included an arrest in June 1986, when she crossed a white painted line indicating the test site's boundary. Sagan, who attended the same protest with Druyan, was not arrested.

In the early 1990s, Druyan worked with Sagan and then-Senator Al Gore Jr. and a host of religious and scientific leaders to bring the scientific and religious worlds together in a unified effort to preserve the environment, resulting in the Declaration of the 'Mission to Washington'.

She was a founding director of the Children's Health Fund until the spring of 2004, a project that provides mobile pediatric care to homeless and disadvantaged children in more than half a dozen cities. She is currently a member of their advisory board.

She has been on the board of directors of the National Organization for the Reform of Marijuana Laws (NORML) for over 10 years and was its president from 2006 to 2010.

== Honors ==
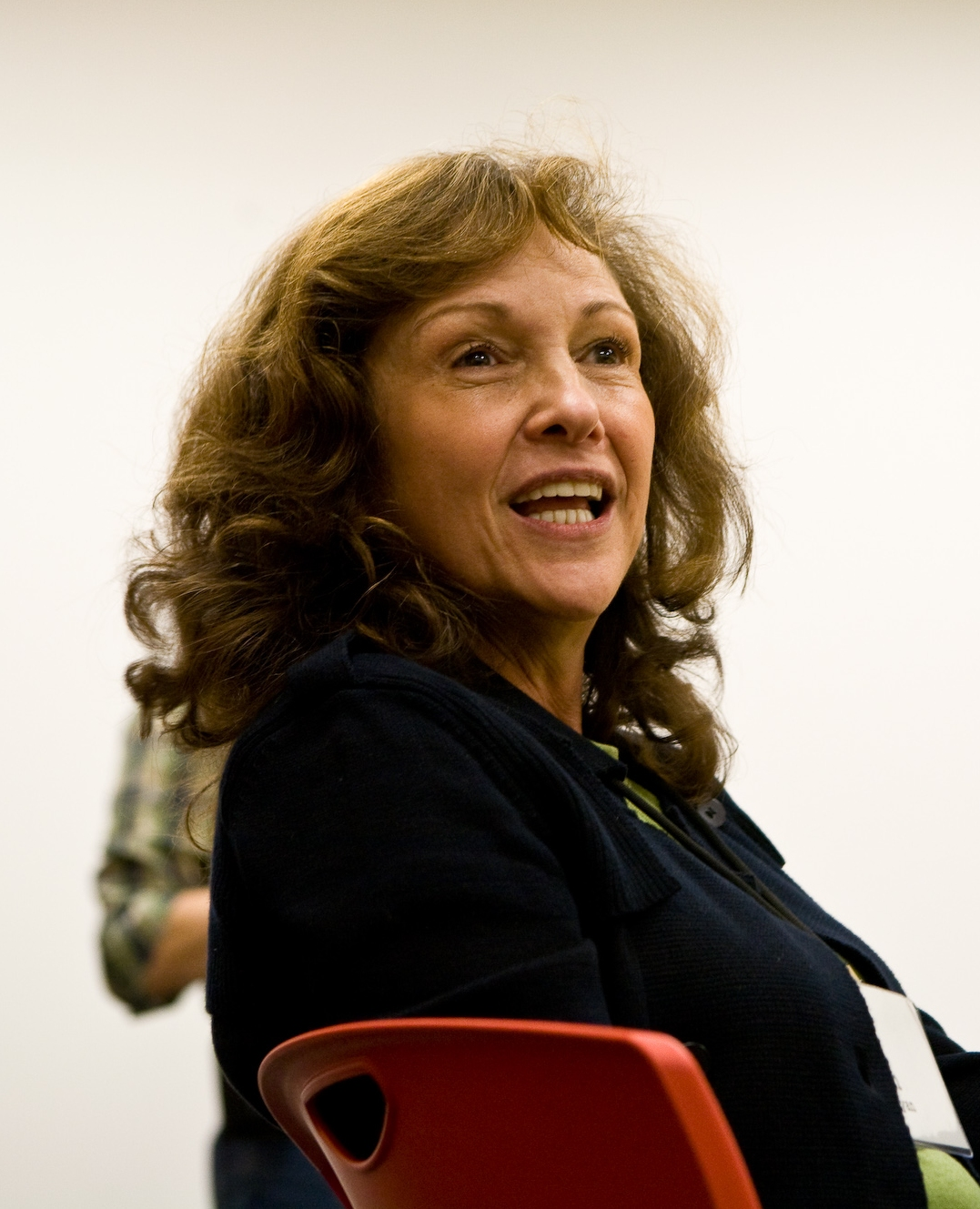
Druyan in 2008

An asteroid discovered in 1988 was named in Druyan's honor by its discoverer Eleanor F. Helin. In a 2020 interview with Skeptical Inquirer, Druyan discussed 4970 Druyan and the asteroid named after her late husband, saying that 4970 Druyan is in a "wedding ring orbit" around the Sun with 2709 Sagan. Druyan was presented with a plaque on Sagan's sixtieth birthday, which is inscribed: "Asteroid 2709 Sagan in eternal companion orbit with asteroid 4970 Druyan, symbolic of their love and admiration for each other."

In November 2006, Druyan was a speaker at "Beyond Belief: Science, Religion, Reason and Survival".

In January 2007, she was a juror at the 2007 Sundance Film Festival, responsible for selecting the winner of the Alfred P. Sloan Prize for films about science and technology.

In November 2007, Druyan was awarded the title of "Humanist Laureate" by the International Academy of Humanism.

In October 2019, the Center for Inquiry West opened the Carl Sagan–Ann Druyan Theater in Los Angeles.

== Religious and philosophical views ==
In an interview with Joel Achenbach of The Washington Post, Druyan said that her early interest in science stemmed from a fascination with Karl Marx. Achenbach commented that "She had, at the time, rather vaporous standards of evidence", a reference to her belief in the ancient astronauts of Erich von Däniken and the theories of Immanuel Velikovsky pertaining to the solar system.

Concerning the death of her husband she stated:

When my husband died, because he was so famous and known for not being a believer, many people would come up to me—it still sometimes happens—and ask me if Carl changed at the end and converted to a belief in an afterlife. They also frequently ask me if I think I will see him again. Carl faced his death with unflagging courage and never sought refuge in illusions. The tragedy was that we knew we would never see each other again. I don't ever expect to be reunited with Carl.

== Personal life ==
Druyan and Sagan's working and resulting romantic relationship has been the subject of numerous treatments in popular culture, including the Radiolab episode "Carl Sagan and Ann Druyan's Ultimate Mix Tape", a segment of the Comedy Central program Drunk History's episode "Space", and the song "Sounds of Earth" by Jim Moray. The asteroid 4970 Druyan, which is in a companion orbit with asteroid 2709 Sagan named after Druyan's late husband, is named after Druyan. In 2015, it was announced that Warner Brothers was in development on a drama about Sagan and Druyan's relationship, to be produced by producer Lynda Obst and Druyan.

In 2020, Sagan and Druyan's daughter Sasha Sagan released a book For Small Creatures Such As We: Rituals for Finding Meaning in our Unlikely World, which discusses life with her parents and her father's death when she was fourteen years old.

Druyan also gave Sasha a recurring role in Cosmos: Possible Worlds, where she played her own grandmother, including in the episode Man of a Trillion Worlds, which featured the life of Carl Sagan.

== Awards ==
- 2004 Richard Dawkins Award
- 2014 Outstanding Writing for Nonfiction Programming Primetime Emmy Award
- 2015 The Award for Outstanding Producer of Non-Fiction Television from Producers Guild of America
- 2015 Writers Guild Award for "Documentary Script – Other than Current Events"
- 2017 Harvard Humanist of the Year Award
- 2020 National Geographic Further Award

== See also ==
- Women in science
- List of peace activists
