= Leonora Payne Ison =

British architectural draughtsperson and artist

Leonora Payne Ison (1904–1996) was a British architectural draughtsperson and artist. She depicted the architectural history of England from antiquity to the 20th century, working in collaboration with her husband Walter Ison, the poet John Betjeman and others.

== Early life and family ==
Leonora Florence Mary Payne was born 4 July 1904 in Wendover, Buckinghamshire. She was the daughter of barrister and historian Edward Payne and his wife Emma Pertz, and younger sister to sister to Humfry and Cecilia. She was the great-granddaughter of physician and writer James Wilkinson. She attended St. Paul's Primary School for Girls before moving on to the Bartlett School of Architecture, where she studied under Professor Sir Albert Richardson and was recognised with prizes as well as being the first woman to win the Owen Jones Traveling Scholarship.

== Adult life ==
While working for cinema architect Frank Verity, Leonora met Walter Ison, as colleague, whom she married in 1931. Shortly after the Second World War, the Isons moved to Bath, which they found the Georgian architecture decayed and in danger of demolition. In 1948 they published The Georgian Buildings of Bath, with Leonora contributing all the illustrations, which aided the work of the Bath Preservation Trust in retaining the architectural legacy. The produced a further volume on Bristol in 1952. She contributed drawings to several other of Walter's books as well as publishing her own volume English Architecture Through the Ages in 1966, which included an introduction by Walter.

From the mid-1950s until 1962, the Isons lived at Rainham Hall in Essex, securing a lease on the Georgian house from the National Trust. They made the house, which had recently secured Grade II* status, available for public visits on Wednesdays and Sundays.

In 1960 she began a collaboration with the poet John Betjeman when The Telegraph asked her to provide illustrations for his architecture column. They collaborated on the column until 1964, when Betjeman was replaced by Peter Fleetwood-Hesketh and later John Chisholm. The column was discontinued at her retirement, at which point she took up flower painting. Leonora and John remained in correspondence until his death, and later contributed drawings to Frank Delaney's posthumous biography of the poet, in which he noted she "captured Betjeman country in its heyday...a visualising amanuensis."

She was elected a Fellow of the Royal Society of Arts in 1973.

== Death and legacy ==
In 1962 she presented a set of her great-grandfather's poems to the British Museum. The Isons moved to St Leonards-on-Sea for their retirement, where she died on 21 November 1996.

== Sources ==
- Catch, J.R. "'A Buckinghamshire polymath: Edward John Payne". Records of Buckinghamshire. 32: 120–129.
- Collett, Jenny (2015). Rainham Hall. National Trust. ISBN 9781843594758. OCLC 973816257.
- Delaney, Frank (1985). Betjeman Country. London: Paladin Books. ISBN 0586084991.
- Hillier, Bevis (2004). Betjeman: the Bonus of Laughter. London: J. Murray. ISBN 0719564956.
- Ison, Leonora; Ison, Walter (1966). English Architecture Through the Ages: Secular Building. Arthur Barker Ltd. OCLC 1152004901.
- Woodward, Christopher (16 December 1996). "OBITUARY : Leonora Ison". The Independent.
