= Wynnefield, Philadelphia =

Wynnefield
- Neighborhood of Philadelphia
- 4900 block of Wynnefield Avenue

- Location within Philadelphia
- Country: United States
- State: Pennsylvania
- County: Philadelphia County
- City: Philadelphia
- Area codes: 215, 267 and 445

Wynnefield is a diverse middle-class neighborhood in West Philadelphia. Its borders are 53rd Street at Jefferson to the south, Philadelphia's Fairmount Park to the east, City Avenue (commonly referred to as "City Line") to the north and the Amtrak Philadelphia Main Line tracks to the west.

Surrounding neighborhoods include Bala Cynwyd to the north, Wynnefield Heights and Belmont Village to the east, Parkside to the south, and Overbrook to the west. Its main commercial arteries are North 54th Street, Bryn Mawr Avenue (2200 block), and City Avenue. It is the home of the television station WPHL-TV (PHL 17).

== History ==
Like the nearby suburban community of Wynnewood, Wynnefield takes its name from William Penn's physician, Thomas Wynne, who built his home Wynnestay at 52nd Street and Woodbine Avenue in 1690. The former Woodside Amusement Park was located in nearby Fairmount Park and is now the separate community of Wynnefield Heights.

Before Wynnefield's expansion in the early twentieth century, it was largely a rural and undeveloped area of farms dating back to the late 1600s. However, this changed with the construction of the Market-Frankford Elevated Train and the various trolley lines. With the creation of the lines it suddenly became easier for people to live farther from their jobs, and into the undeveloped areas of the city. Today, all but one of Philadelphia's trolley lines are exclusively operational in West Philadelphia.

In Philadelphia, the Jewish-American community was discriminated against in certain neighborhoods in Philadelphia, prompting them to create their own community in Wynnefield. From about 1900, Wynnefield was considered an upscale community with predominantly Jewish-American residents. However, there were large groups of non-Jewish immigrants from Russia, Germany, and other Eastern European countries that formed the Wynnefield community.

In the 1920s Wynnefield expanded again, through the purchasing of rural lots, and their conversion into smaller plotted neighborhoods of row houses. Additional streets, such as Diamond Street were put in 1923 and additional row housing increasing the population of the neighborhood. German-Catholics moved into the neighborhood, prompting the founding of Saint Barbara's Roman Catholic Church in January 1921 on Georges Lane and Lebanon Ave near 54th Street.

Until the 1960s, an area near Wynnefield, Bala Cynwyd, across City Avenue in Lower Merion Township, was known as an upscale shopping district. Small, local boutiques thrived alongside of The Blum Store, Bonwit Teller, and Lord & Taylor. Betty's hat shop was a popular destination for the Main Line elite and Jackie Kennedy fans. Suburbanites would bring their families to spend the day shopping and to enjoy a meal at local haunts such as Pub Tiki and Williamson's Restaurant. Women from areas such as nearby Bucks County would ride into Bala Cynwyd on SEPTA buses, donning their best garb and wearing their white gloves.

In the mid-1960s, the neighborhood began the transition into being largely African American. As of 2006, changes to the neighborhood include the expansion of St. Joseph's University, and an influx of students and new residents of non-African descent moving into the area. Today Wynnefield closely parallels highly regarded Mt. Airy as being one of the most racially diverse neighborhoods in Philadelphia.

Much of the development of Wynnefield after the 1960s is due to the influence of the late Katie B. Jackson (1929–1993). Known by the African-American community as "Queen of Wynnefield," Jackson founded the Wynnefield Academy, a private, co-educational PK-4 elementary school in 1975. The Katie B. Jackson Development Corporation and Katie B. Jackson Senior Citizens Complex bear her name.

Har Zion Temple, a synagogue, built at 54th & Wynnefield Ave in 1924, was a longtime resident of the area before moving to larger facilities in Penn Valley, PA in 1976.

The William Mann School and Wynnestay are listed on the National Register of Historic Places.

== Demographic ==
According the U.S. Census from the 2019 American Community Survey 5-Year Estimates, the total population of 19131, which include Overbrook, Wynnfield, Belmont Village, and Wynnefield Heights, was 44,723 where 44.5% is male and 55.5% is female. Per the 2019 U.S. Census data, the community is 82.2% African-American, 13.4% Caucasian, 4.1% Asian/Pacific Islander and 3.6% Hispanic/Latino.

The mean household income in the past 12 months (in 2019 inflation-adjusted dollars) was $49,724.

Of the 21,361 total housing units located in the 19131 zip code per 2019 Census data, 8,544 or 48.8% are owner-occupied units. The neighborhood offers a variety of housing types: two-story brick town homes and row duplexes, garden apartments, and mid-rise and high-rise apartment homes.

== Education ==
=== Colleges and universities ===
About half of Saint Joseph's University's Hawk Hill campus is in Wynnefield.

=== Primary and secondary schools ===
==== Public schools ====
Wynnefield is served by the School District of Philadelphia.

Elementary schools:

- Samuel Gompers Elementary School (K-8)
- William B. Mann Elementary School. However, this school is now a Mastery Charter School.

High schools:

- Overbrook High School.
- Science Leadership Academy at Beeber (The former Beeber Middle School)

Charter schools:

- The Laboratory Charter School of Communication and Languages

==== Private schools ====
- Woodbine Academy
- St. Rose of Lima Catholic School
- Settlement Music School, Wynnefield Branch

=== Public libraries ===
Free Library of Philadelphia operates the Wynnefield Branch .

== Notable people ==
Wynnefield also has connections to the motion picture and music industries. Wynnefield is the childhood home of actor and rapper Will Smith, film producer Lee Daniels (Monster's Ball and The Woodsman), film director Charles Stone III, and documentary filmmaker Tigre Hill. Also, former basketball player Julius Erving once resided there as well as boxer Michael Spinks.

Local politicians with Wynnefield ties include Philadelphia mayor Michael Nutter, former mayor Wilson Goode, and city councilwoman Blondell Reynolds Brown.

== Places of worship ==
- Wynnefield Presbyterian Church
- Pinn Memorial Baptist Church
- West Side Baptist Church
- Wynnefield Baptist Church
- St. Barbara Catholic Church
- Bethel Holiness Pentecostal Church
- Overbrook Avenue Gospel Hall
- New Testament Church of God
- Endtime Zion Church of Jesus
- Community Bible Tabernacle Church
- International Church of God
- Church of the Advocate
- Evelyn Graves Ministries Church
- Baha'i Community of Phila
- Bawa Muhaiyaddeen Fellowship Mosque
- Kol Tzedek Synagogue
