= Blakeway =

Blakeway is an English surname. Notable people by that name include:

- Alan Blakeway (1898–1936), British archaeologist
- Cassie Blakeway (born 1993), Australian rules footballer
- Charles Blakeway (1868–1922), Archdeacon of Stafford
- Denys Blakeway, British television producer and author
- Graham Blakeway, English rugby league footballer who played in the 1960s
- Jacob Blakeway (1583–?), historical figure connected to the Mayflower
- John Brickdale Blakeway (1765–1826), English barrister, cleric and topographer
- Phil Blakeway (born 1950), England international rugby union footballer
