= Payne-Gaposchkin =

Payne-Gaposchkin could refer to:

- Cecilia Payne-Gaposchkin, 1900–1979, astronomer
- 2039 Payne-Gaposchkin, an asteroid discovered in 1974, named after Cecilia Payne-Gaposchkin
