= Thomas Wynne =

17th century English physician

- Born: July 20, 1627; Caerwys, Wales
- Died: January 16, 1692 (aged 64); Philadelphia, Province of Pennsylvania
- Occupations: Physician, politician

Thomas Wynne (July 20, 1627 – January 16, 1692) was personal physician of William Penn and one of the original settlers of Philadelphia in the Province of Pennsylvania. Born in Ysceifiog, Wales, where his family dated back seventeen generations to Owain Gwynedd, he accompanied Penn on his original journey to America on the ship Welcome.

== Early life and education ==
According to church records, Wynne was born on July 20, 1627, the fourth of five sons of Thomas Wynne, Sr. Wynne lost his father at the age of 11. While attracted to the study of medicine early on, heavy taxes levied on his family originally made the acquisition of proper learning materials difficult. His trade was that of cooper. He was later able to make the acquaintance of an established surgeon by the name of Richard Moore, and soon he was able to apprentice until he was deemed worthy of licensing. He was licensed in Shropshire by Drs. Hollins, Needham and Moore. Wynne in turn, after the death of Dr. Richard Moore, apprenticed Moore's son Mordecai.

== Immigration to Pennsylvania ==
Born into the Anglican Church, he in 1655 married Quaker Martha Buttall (1627–1670) and found himself profoundly converted. He became a devout Quaker, and authored several pamphlets on Quaker doctrine. Wynne faced persecution, including six years' imprisonment in England in the 1680s. After Martha died, he married a twice-widowed woman, Elizabeth Rowden Maude (b. 1637; d. after 1691), on July 20, 1676, and she accompanied him as he joined Penn on his trip to America, leaving on August 30 and landing on October 27, 1682.

== Career ==
Wynne was notable for erecting the first brick house in colonial-era Philadelphia, on his "Liberty Lot" at Front and Chestnut streets, known as Wynne Street until renamed by Penn in 1684. He built a home at 52nd Street and Woodbine Avenue in 1690 named "Wynnestay", a reference to the Wynnstay estate in Wales owned by Sir John Wynn, 1st Baronet, a collateral cousin), and several surrounding communities in the greater Philadelphia area now bear his name. He returned to England with Penn in 1684. He served as speaker for the first two Pennsylvania Assemblies of the Province in Philadelphia in 1687 and 1688 and acted as Justice of Sussex County, now a county in Delaware, from 1687 to 1691. He was appointed a justice of the peace in January 1690 and held the position of justice of the provincial court from September 1690 until his death.

== Death ==
His time in America lasted only nine years. His death is noted by the meeting of Radnor Friends Meetinghouse then at Duckett's Farm, which in 1950 was located at the West Philadelphia train station not far from his home at Wynnestay. Thomas Wynne's burial is noted in the Philadelphia Meeting records at Ducketts Farm Burial Ground.

== Family ==
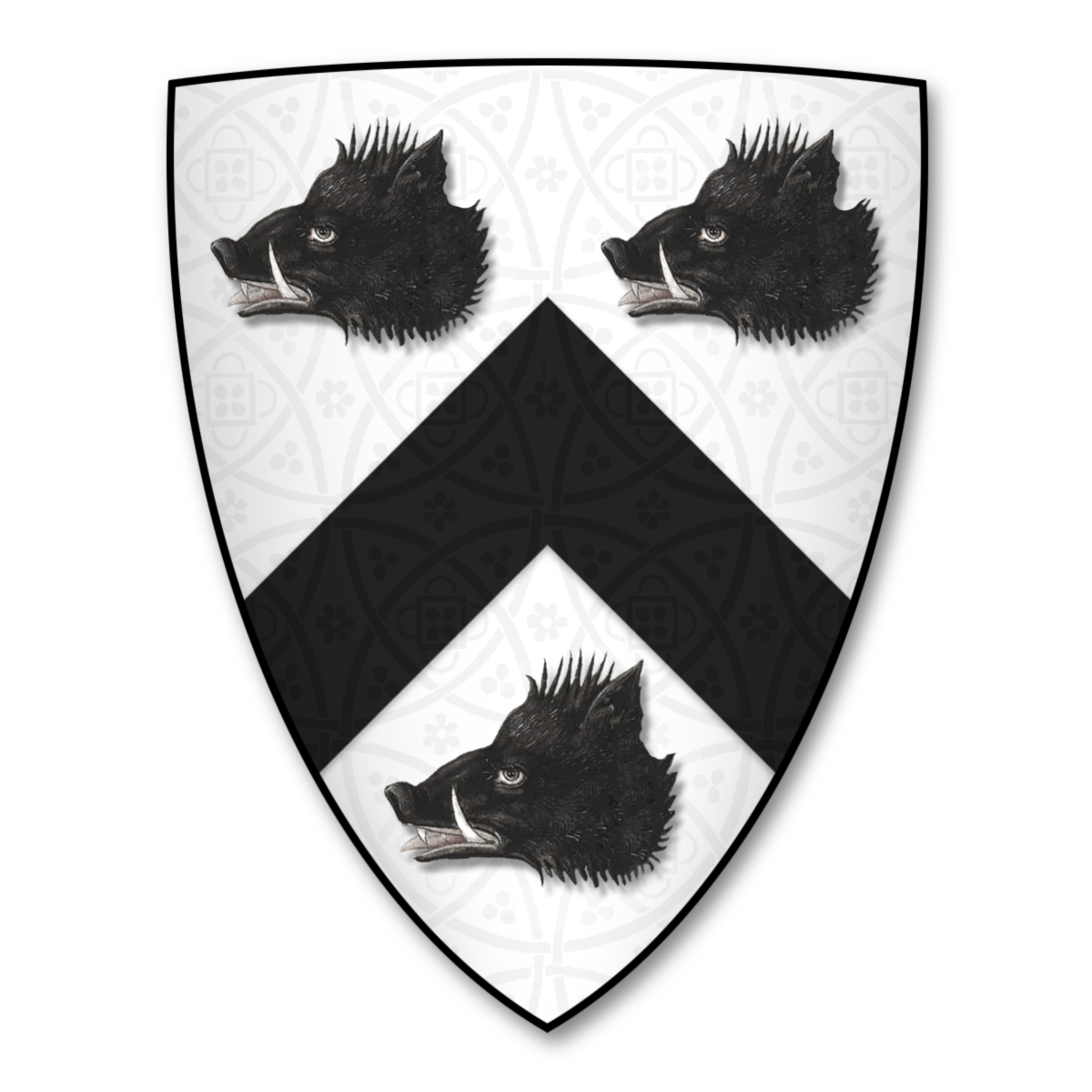
Wynne's coat of arms

Among his descendants, through Mary Wynne and Dr. Edward Jones,: John Cadwalader, Lambert Cadwalader, John Dickinson, Sally Wister; through his daughter Rebecca: Charles Dickinson; through his daughter Hannah Joshua Humphreys and Charles Humphreys; through his step daughter Margery Maude Joshua Fisher; great-grandsons, Thomas, and Warner Wynne, through his son Jonathan, son Jonathan all served in the Pennsylvania "Flying Camp" and were taken prisoner by the British at the Battle of Fort Washington and Thomas was held on the prison ships in New York Harbor. His great-grandson Thomas through his son Jonathan, son Thomas died shortly after George Washington's crossing of the Delaware River from him Gustavus Wynne Cook. This Thomas is remembered on the Lower Merion Revolutionary War Memorial.

== See also ==
- Wynnewood, Pennsylvania
- Penn Wynne, Pennsylvania
- Wynnefield, Philadelphia
- Wynnefield Heights, Philadelphia
