= Edward John Payne =

English barrister and historian (1844–1904)

Edward John Payne (22 July 1844 – 26 December 1904) was an English barrister and historian specializing in colonial history.

== Life ==
The elder son of Edward William Payne, of High Wycombe, Buckinghamshire, Payne was educated at High Wycombe Royal Grammar School and at Magdalen Hall and Charsley's Hall, Oxford, taking a second in Honour Moderations (Latin and Greek literature) in the Trinity Term of 1869 and a first class degree in Literae Humaniores in 1871. The next year he was elected a Fellow of University College, Oxford, and in 1874 was called to the bar from Lincoln's Inn. The same year, he published the first volume of his Select Works of Burke. He was appointed as Recorder of High Wycombe in 1883. As a barrister, he was a member of the chambers at 2, Stone Buildings.

Payne was a capable viola da gamba player. In 1880 he gave a musical lecture-recital, when he played pieces by Johann Sebastian Bach, Handel, Caix and Abel.

In 1899 Payne married Emma Leonora Helena Pertz, the elder daughter of Major Pertz of Holt, Norfolk, and of Koblenz, Prussia, and they set up home at Holywell Lodge, Wendover, Buckinghamshire. His wife was a niece of the German historian Georg Heinrich Pertz and of the Swedenborgian writer James John Garth Wilkinson.

Payne died on Boxing Day, 1904, in uncertain circumstances, being found drowned in a canal at Wendover.

Despite the shortness of his marriage, he was the father of three children, the astronomer Cecilia Payne-Gaposchkin (1900–1979), the archaeologist Humfry Payne (1902–1936), who married the writer Dilys Powell (1901–1995) and Leonora Florence Mary Payne (1904-1996), who married the architectural historian Walter Ison, with whom she produced, amongst other books, 'The Georgian Buildings of Bath'.

Payne's A History of the New World called America, an ambitious attempt at a comprehensive history of the Americas, remained unfinished at his death.

== Major publications ==
- Select Works of Burke in three volumes (1874–1876)
- History of European Colonies (1877)
- Voyages of the Elizabethan Seamen to America, in two volumes (1893–1900)
- With James Sutherland Cotton: Colonies and Dependencies: India and the Colonies (London : Macmillan, 1883)
- A History of the New World called America, in two volumes (1892–1899)
- The Colonies (British Citizen Series, 1902)
- 'The Age of Discovery' and 'The New World', chapters 1 & 2 of Cambridge Modern History, vol. I (1902)
- Colonies and Colonial Federations (London : Macmillan, 1904)
