= Rittenhouse Medal =

Astronomy award

The Rittenhouse Medal is awarded by the Rittenhouse Astronomical Society for outstanding achievement in the science of Astronomy. The medal was one of those originally minted to commemorate the Bi-Centenary of the birth of David Rittenhouse on April 8, 1932. In 1952 the Society decided to establish a silver medal to be awarded to astronomers for noteworthy achievement in astronomical science. The silver medal is cast from the die (obverse) used for the Bi-Centennial Rittenhouse Medal.

Year	Recipient	Affiliation
Certificate Medal
1933	Frank Schlesinger	Director Yale Observatory
1934	Robert G. Aitken	Director Lick Observatory
1935	Harlow Shapley	Mount Wilson Observatory
1936	Robert McMath	Director McMath-Hulbert Observatory
1937	Armin O. Leuschner	Berkley Astronomical Department
1938	Knut Lundmark	Professor of Astronomy, University of Lund, Sweden
1940	Gustavus Wynne Cook	Director Cook Observatory
1940	John A. Miller	Director Emeritus, Sproul Observatory
1943	Forest Ray Moulton	Secretary, American Association for the Advancement of Science
1943	Samuel Fels	Philanthropist and Donor of Fels Planetarium
Silver Medal
1952	Gerard P. Kuiper	Director Yerkes Observatory
1953	Harlow Shapley	Director Harvard Observatory
1954	Otto Struve	President International Astronomical Union
1955	Harold Spencer Jones	Astronomer Royal of England
1958	Lyman Spitzer, Jr.	Director Princeton University Observatory
1959	Bengt Stromgren	Professor; Institute for Advanced Study, Princeton
1960	Fred Hoyle	Plumian Professor of Astronomy, Cambridge University
1961	Cecilia Payne-Gaposchkin	Professor Harvard University
1965	Peter Van De Kamp	Director Sproul Observatory, Swarthmore College
1966	Martin Schwarzschild	Professor; Princeton University
1967	Helen Sawyer Hogg	Professor at University of Toronto; Harvard College Observatory
1968	Allan Sandage	
1980	Carl Sagan	
1988	Carolyn Shoemaker, Eugene Shoemaker	
1990	Clyde Tombaugh	

== See also ==
- List of astronomy awards
