= Frances Rollins Morse =

American social activist and conservationist (1850–1928)

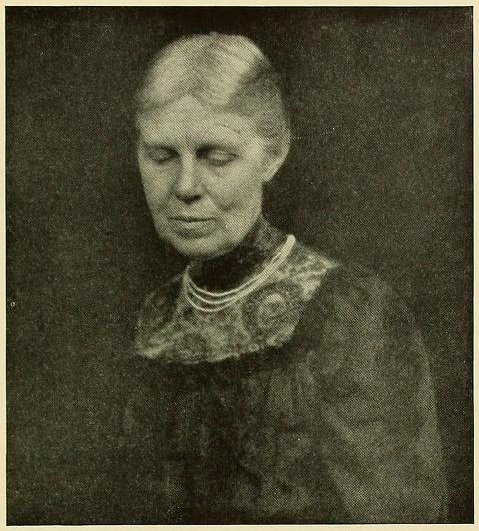
- Photograph of Frances Rollins Morse
- Born: January 21, 1850; Boston, Massachusetts
- Died: 1928 (aged 77–78)
- Parent(s): Samuel Torrey Morse; Harriet Jackson Lee Morse
- Relatives: Mary Lee Morse (aunt)

Frances Rollins Morse (1850–1928) or Fanny Rollins Morse was an American conservationist and social activist. She is noted for her initiatives in the field of social work. Morse was one of the founders of the Associated Charities of Boston and was a co-founder of the School of Social Work at Simmons College.

== Biography ==
Morse was born in Boston on January 21, 1850, to Samuel Torrey Morse (1816–1890) and Harriet Jackson Lee Morse. Samuel Morse was a tradesman and a founding member of the Union Club during the American Civil War. Her mother was the sister of Mary Lee Morse, who was a noted member of the Boston elite. The Morse family descended from Patrick Tracy Jackson, one of the owners of the Lowell Textile Mills and was also the treasurer of the Boston and Lowell Railroad.

Morse studied at Miss Clapp's school in Boston. There she met Alice James, the American diarist who would become her life-long friend. James was two years her senior. The published correspondence of James and her brother William James included letters to Morse, which cited her conservation and charity activities.

In her adult years, she was known for her charity and social work in Boston. A collection of her works, correspondence, travel diaries and other documents had been given to Harvard University’s Schlesinger Library. She also published a collection of letters and journals of her family.
