= Alan Blakeway =

British archaeologist

Alan Albert Antisdel Blakeway (1898 - 9 October 1936) was a British archaeologist who was director of the British School at Athens.

== Early life ==
Alan Albert Antisdel Blakeway was born in 1898, the eldest son of the venerable C.E. (Charles Edward) Blakeway, Archdeacon of Stafford.

== Career ==
Blakeway was a master at Winchester College from 1924 to 1931. He was a fellow of Corpus Christi College, University of Oxford. He was appointed director of the British School at Athens in 1936 but died the same year. He was replaced by G.M. Young.

== Family ==
Blakeway married Alison Hope (later Mrs Antony Andrewes) in 1935.

== Death ==
Blakeway died of blood poisoning at Winchester on 9 October 1936.

== Selected publications ==
- "Prolegomena to the study of Greek commerce with Italy, Sicily, and France in the eighth and seventh centuries B.C.," Annual of the British School at Athens, 33, pp. 170–208.
- "Demaratus: A study in some aspects of the earliest Hellenisation of Latium and Etruria", Journal of Roman Studies, 1935.
- Lectures on early Greek history and the Peloponnesian League. Oxford, 1935.

== See also ==
- Humfry Payne
