= Hardy Williams Academy =

- Anna Howard Shaw Junior High School
- U.S. National Register of Historic Places
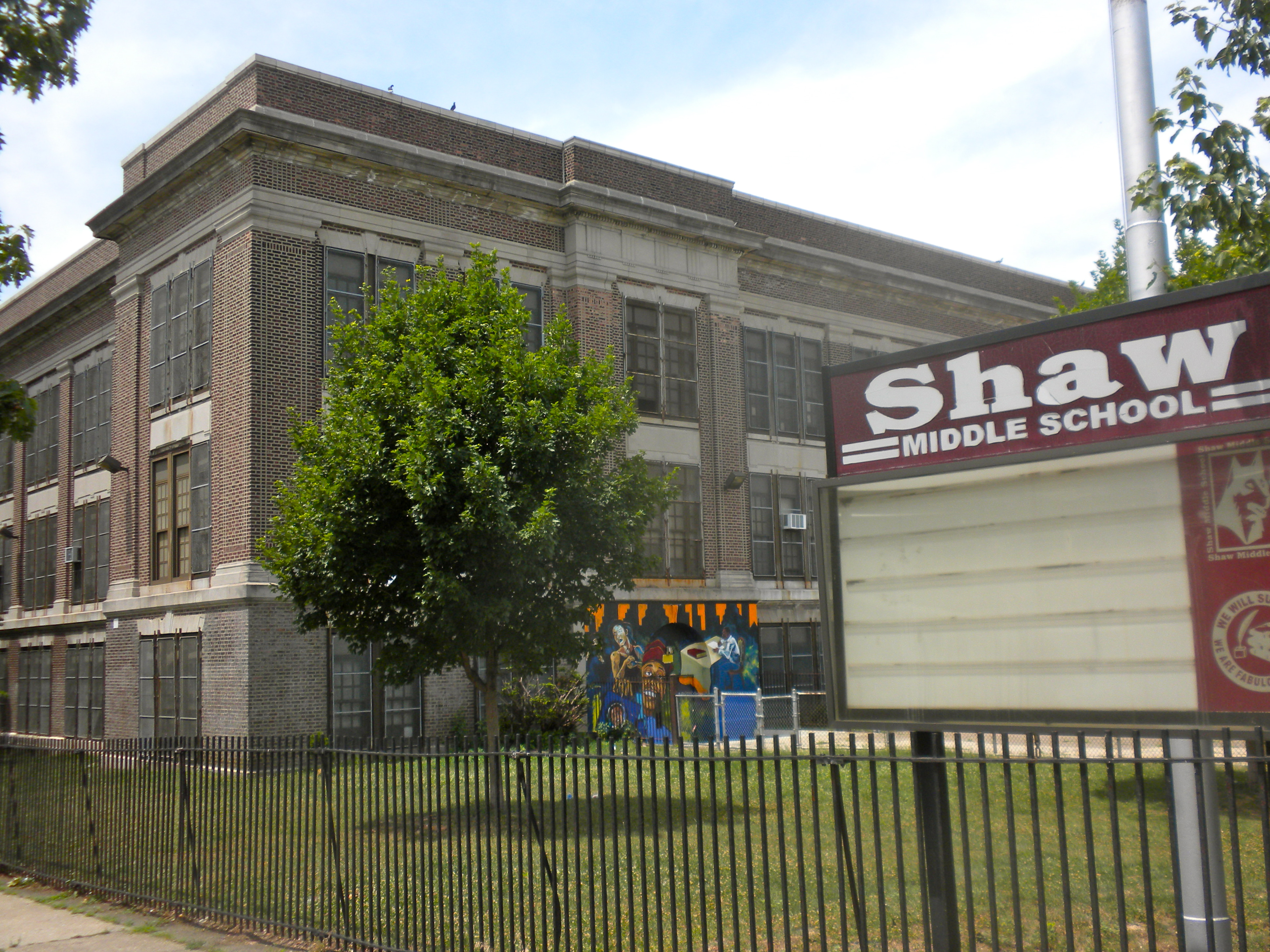
- Anna Howard Shaw Junior High School, June 2010

- Location within Philadelphia Location within Pennsylvania Location within the United States
- Location: 5400 Warrington Ave., Philadelphia, Pennsylvania, United States
- Coordinates: 39.9419°N 75.2264°W
- Area: 3.2 acres (1.3 ha)
- Built: 1922–1924
- Architect: Irwin T. Catharine
- Architectural style: Colonial Revival
- Website: masterycharter.org/secondary-schools/hardy-williams-high
- MPS: Philadelphia Public Schools TR
- NRHP reference No.: 88002321
- Added to NRHP: November 18, 1988

The Hardy Williams Academy, formerly the Anna Howard Shaw Junior High School, is a historic junior high school building located in the Southwest Schuylkill neighborhood of Philadelphia, Pennsylvania, United States.

It was added to the National Register of Historic Places in 1988.

== History and architectural features ==
The building was designed by Irwin T. Catharine and built between 1922 and 1924. It is a three-story, seventeen-bay, brick building which sits on a raised stone basement. It was designed in the Colonial Revival-style in the shape of a shallow "W," and features a center projecting pavilion, stone cornice, and a brick parapet. The school was named for Anna Howard Shaw.

Since 2015, the school has been used as a charter school run by Mastery Charter Schools. It was renamed in honor of Hardy Williams.
