= Alice James =

American writer (1848–1892)

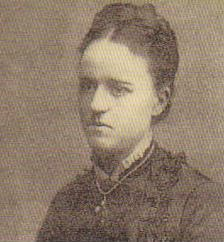
- Photograph of Alice James
- Born: August 7, 1848; New York City, U.S.
- Died: March 6, 1892 (aged 43); London, England
- Resting place: Cambridge Cemetery, Cambridge, Massachusetts, U.S.
- Occupations: Writer, diarist
- Parents: Henry James Sr. (father); Mary Robertson Walsh (mother)
- Relatives: William James (brother); Henry James (brother)

Alice James (August 7, 1848 – March 6, 1892) was an American diarist, and the younger sister of novelist Henry James and philosopher and psychologist William James. Her relationship with William was unusually close, and she seems to have been badly affected by his marriage. James suffered lifelong health problems that were generally dismissed as hysteria in the style of the day. She is best known for her published diaries.

== Life ==
Born into a wealthy and intellectually active family, daughter of Henry James Sr. of Albany, New York, and Mary Robertson Walsh. James soon developed the psychological and physical problems that would plague her until the end of her life at age 43 due to breast cancer. The youngest of five children, she lived with her parents until their deaths in 1882. She went to a Boston school called Miss Clapp’s, where she met Frances Rollins Morse, one of her life-long friends often cited in her published diary and correspondence.

James taught history from 1873 to 1876 for the Society to Encourage Studies at Home, a Boston-based correspondence school for women founded by Anna Eliot Ticknor. The three years she taught were "among the most illness-free she had." James never married, seeking affection from her brothers and female friends instead. After her father's death in late 1882, she inherited a share in the income from the family properties in Albany, and her brother Henry made over his own share to her. This allowed her to live independently without employment.

== Era of hysteria ==
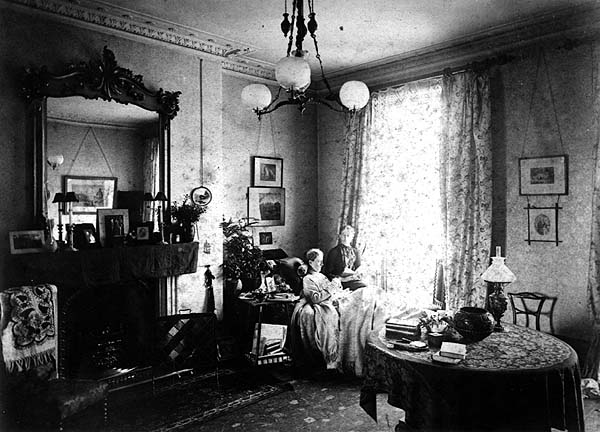
Alice James (reclining) and Katharine Loring, taken at the Royal Leamington Spa (England), c. 1890

In the Victorian era, hysteria was an extremely common diagnosis for women. Almost any disease a woman had could fit the symptoms of hysteria because there was no set list of symptoms. In 1888, twenty years after James was "overwhelmed by violent turns of hysteria", she wrote in her diary that she was both suicidal and homicidal. She was struggling with the urge to kill her father, though this diary entry does not state the reason why she was patricidal. In 1866, James traveled to New York to receive "therapeutic exercise", and in 1884, she received electrical "massage". Hoping that a change of scenery would improve her health, she traveled to England with her companion (likely partner) Katharine Loring. She was ultimately diagnosed with neurasthenia, which kept her bedridden for much of her life.

== Breast cancer and treatment ==
As Alice was suffering from breast cancer, her brother William James wrote her a letter explaining how much he pitied her. He advised her to "look for the little good in each day as if life were to last a hundred years." He wanted her to save herself from suffering the torment of physical pain. "Take all the morphia (or other forms of opium if that disagrees) you want, and don't be afraid of becoming an opium-drunkard. What was opium created for except for such times as this?"

William also suggested that she might benefit from hypnotism and recommended the London physician Charles Lloyd Tuckey. Concerned about her suggestibility to hypnotism, instead Tuckey taught Katharine Loring to hypnotically relax Alice, allowing her to sleep once more: "under ... the pawings of an amiable necromancer, I have regained all my native dignity."

== Diary ==
James began to keep a diary in 1889. The diary was not published for many years after her death due to sharp comments on various persons whom she had mentioned by name. A poorly edited version of the diary was eventually released in 1934. Leon Edel edited a fuller edition in 1964.

== Relationship with William ==
Howard Feinstein, in Becoming William James (1984), wrote that Alice and her brother William had a close relationship that has been argued to consist of eroticism. William would write "mock sonnets" to Alice and read them to her in front of their family. One such sonnet has William declaring his desire to marry Alice, "I swore to ask thy hand, my love." The sonnet goes on to describe Alice rejecting him, "So very proud, but yet so fair/The look you on me threw/You told me I must never dare/To hope for love from you." William concludes the sonnet by saying that he will commit suicide because Alice will not marry him.

Given the nature of the family's constant humorous bantering and affectionate teasing, it is widely understood that the sonnet was entirely a joke - though to an end which Jean Strouse, her biographer, questions with concerns about how Alice has been positioned within the family dynamic: "Was William complementing or making fun of her? Did the idea of sweet little Alice as a desirable woman seem ridiculous? Did only boys have inflamed hearts? Did brothers marry sisters? The poem celebrates an Alice who is the object of male dreams, a fatal child-woman whose refusal of her entranced suitor brother condemned him to suicide. Were girls supposed to be cool and superior to desire and despair?"

== Relationship with Katharine Peabody Loring ==
James's relationship with her companion Katharine Peabody Loring, with whom she lived for over a decade, was the inspiration for Henry James's 1886 novel The Bostonians.

== Sources ==
Anna Robeson Brown Burr edited and wrote an introduction to Alice James, Her Brothers — Her Journal (1934). Jean Strouse published what has become the standard life (Alice James: A Biography) in 1980. Strouse steered something of a middle course between Alice-as-icon and Alice-as-victim. Ruth Yeazell published James's correspondence in The Death and Letters of Alice James (1981). Susan Sontag wrote a play about James, Alice in Bed (1993), which seems to waver between sympathy and impatience with its subject. Lynne Alexander wrote a sympathetic novel about Alice James, The Sister (2012). In American Breakdown: Our Ailing Nation, My Body's Revolt, and the Nineteenth-Century Woman Who Brought Me Back to Life, Jennifer Lunden used memoir, biography, and social criticism to correlate Alice's illness with her own, myalgic encephalomyelitis/chronic fatigue syndrome.
