= Gustavus Wynne Cook =

American banker (1867–1940)

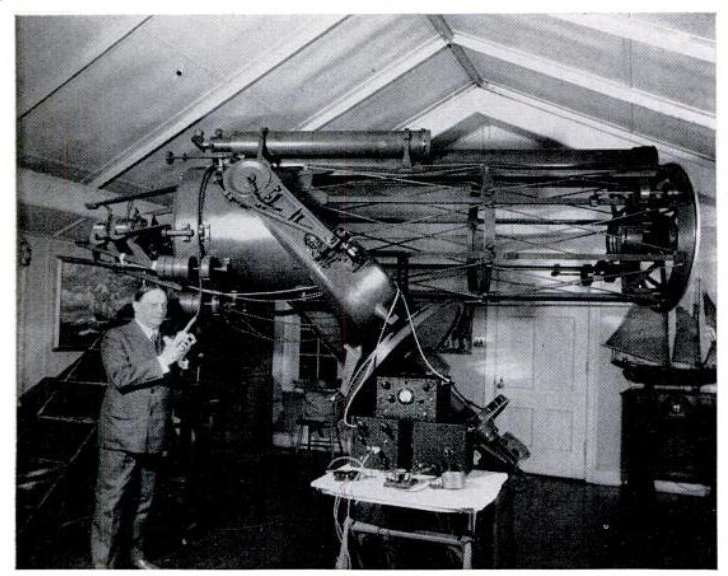
Cook in 1939 with his private telescope which cost him $100,000

Gustavus Wynne Cook (December 12, 1867 – June 4, 1940) was an American banker, businessman, and amateur astronomer. Cook was born in Philadelphia, Pennsylvania, the son of Lavinia Borden and Richard Yerkes Cook (a descendant of Dr. Thomas Wynne). He married Nannie Mumford Bright and they lived at Roslyn House in Wynnewood, Pennsylvania. The Roslyn House Observatory was in their home. They had two daughters, Nancy Wynne Cook Putnam (1897–1980) and Lavinia Cook Wright.

Cook was president of the South Chester Tube Company (now Southco) and the South Chester Terminal and Warehouse. The Flower and Cook Observatory located in Malvern, Pennsylvania, which was part of the University of Pennsylvania, is named in his honor. He was elected to the American Philosophical Society in 1934.

Cook is laid to rest in the Church of the Advocate burial vault.
