= Henry James Sr. =

American Swedenborgian theologian (1811–1882)

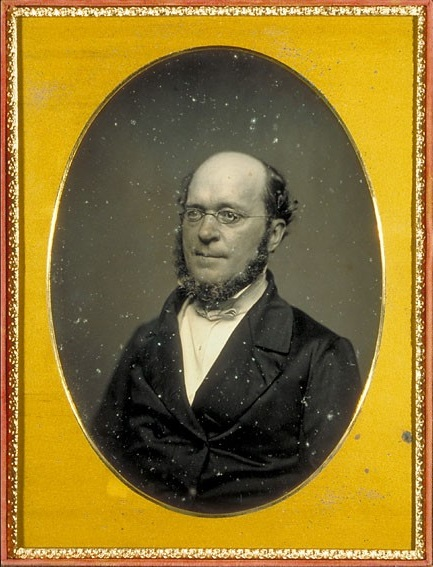
- Daguerreotype of James, c. 1855
- Born: June 3, 1811; Albany, New York, U.S.
- Died: December 18, 1882 (aged 71); Boston, Massachusetts, U.S.
- Education: Union College; Princeton Theological Seminary
- Occupation: Theologian
- Spouse: Mary Robertson Walsh (m. 1840; died 1882)
- Children: William; Henry; Garth; Robertson; Alice

Henry James Sr. (June 3, 1811 – December 18, 1882) was an American theologian and the father of the philosopher William James, the novelist Henry James, and the diarist Alice James.

Following a dramatic moment of spiritual enlightenment, he became deeply absorbed in Swedenborgianism, repudiating materialism and following the utopian path to grace. In this way, he was generally out of sympathy with contemporary American leaders of philosophical thought. His influence was felt more in frequent lively debates within his own circle of friends than in public life. He said “I love the fireside rather than the forum."

== Early life ==
James was born on June 3, 1811, in Albany, New York. He was one of twelve children born to Catharine (née Barber) James and William James (1771–1832), an emigrant from Bailieborough, County Cavan, Ireland, to the United States around 1789, who amassed a fortune of about $1.2 million from business dealings in upstate New York State, primarily in Albany real estate, money lending, and his involvement with the building of the Erie Canal.

At the age of thirteen, he was severely burned trying to stamp out a fire in a barn, and lost a leg to amputation. The three years he was bedridden reinforced his studious disposition. After attending The Albany Academy, he entered Union College in 1828 and graduated in 1830. His father, a Presbyterian, disapproved of his religious ideas, but when the patriarch's will was broken, he became an independently wealthy man. He studied at Princeton Theological Seminary from 1835 to 1837 to prepare for the ministry, but found himself disconcerted by "enormous difficulties which inhered in its philosophy," and abandoned the idea of becoming a minister. After Princeton, James then went to England for about a year, and returned in 1838 to New York.

== Career ==
Upon James's return to New York in 1838, he prepared an edition of Robert Sandeman's Letters on Theron and Aspasio, which has been called the principal literary document of a Scottish sect that opposed the Presbyterian Church. In his preface to Sandeman's work, he called it "a far more faithful exhibition of Gospel truth than any other work." What specifically interested James was its radically egalitarian message. Sandeman wrote: "In fine, the whole New Testament speaks aloud, that as to the matter of acceptance with God, there is no difference betwixt one man and another; — no difference betwixt the best accomplished gentleman, and the most infamous scoundrel; — no difference betwixt the most virtuous lady and the vilest prostitute ..."

=== Swedenborgianism ===
Around 1841, James began to be interested in Swedenborgianism when he read some articles in London's Monthly Magazine on the subject by J. J. Garth Wilkinson, who would become one of James's closest friends. In his quest, he met and befriended Ralph Waldo Emerson, but did not find much satisfaction in Emerson's thought.

Emerson introduced James to Thomas Carlyle. But it was in the work of Emanuel Swedenborg (1688–1772), the Swedish scientist, religious visionary and teacher, that James found a spiritual home. In May 1844, while living in Windsor, in England, James was sitting alone one evening at the family dinner table after the meal, gazing at the fire, when he had the defining spiritual experience of his life, which he would come to interpret as a Swedenborgian "vastation," a stage in the process of spiritual regeneration. This experience was an apprehension of, in his own words, "a perfectly insane and abject terror, without ostensible cause, and only to be accounted for, to my perplexed imagination, by some damned shape squatting invisible to me within the precincts of the room, and raying out from his fetid personality influences fatal to life."

James's "vastation" initiated a spiritual crisis that lasted two years, and was finally resolved through the thorough exploration of the work of Swedenborg and Christian mystics. James became convinced that, as he put it, "the curse of mankind, that which keeps our manhood so little and so depraved, is its sense of selfhood, and the absurd abominable opinionativeness it engenders." He remained attached to Swedenborg's thought for the rest of life, and never traveled without carrying Swedenborg's works with him.

In 1845, James again returned to the United States and began a lifetime of lecturing about his spiritual discoveries. He devoted his mornings to writing, and published a number of discursive volumes devoted to the exposition of his thought.

=== Social thought ===
In the late 1840s, James became interested in the former members of Brook Farm, an experiment in communal living at West Roxbury, Massachusetts that lasted from 1841 to 1847, and in Fourierism, the school of utopian socialism that grew out of the thought of French social philosopher Charles Fourier (1772–1837) and which was a major influence in the last several years of Brook Farm. James was interested in utopianism as a stepping stone to the spiritual life.

James was a stern critic of the "gross materiality" of American society, and found in Fourier's thought a useful critique. He held most of the leading writers of his day in low regard, with the possible exception of Walt Whitman, though he met and cultivated many of them, including Emerson, Bronson Alcott, Henry David Thoreau, and William Makepeace Thackeray.

James was an advocate of many social reforms, including the abolition of slavery and the liberalization of divorce.

=== Theology ===
Theologically, James was out of sympathy with the naturalism of much of the religious thought of the nineteenth century. He regarded creation itself as "a purely spiritual process, falling wholly within the realm of affection and thought." The fundamental theological problem, in his view, is theodicy, or the problem of evil. His Swedenborgian solution to the problem of evil relied on breaking the bond between God and nature, or, put alternatively, between nature and reality. True reality (or God) is, in James's view, thoroughly spiritual, in a way that denizens of the natural world can scarcely comprehend. But through intuition of this true reality, James thought, liberation from the illusions of natural appearances—which include time, space, and selfhood—is possible. In such liberation lies salvation, in James's view, whereas evil—more specifically, spiritual evil, since James distinguishes this from "physical" and "moral" evil—arises from action based on the delusion of selfhood. C. Hartley Grattan says that in James's philosophy, "the principle of hell is selfhood and the principle of heaven is brotherly love". But James was not a slavish follower of Swedenborg. Rather, it was in Swedenborg that he found the most fecund exploration of his central insight that the source of all evil was in attachment to the self.

=== Later years ===
Although the ideas of James were received by his contemporaries with little enthusiasm, and although he was altogether out of sympathy with his age's enthusiasm for science, he never grew discouraged; in fact, some of the best expositions of his thought are to be found in the volumes of his later years. He participated actively in the lives of his children, whose education he had done so much to shape. His society was cultivated by many, who enjoyed his conversation—provided that they were strong enough to bear the sometimes devastating criticism he offered. He delighted in paradox and exaggeration and enjoyed flouting convention. But he shunned formal society, which he found uncongenial. He wrote: "The bent of my nature is towards affection and thought rather than action. I love the fireside rather than the forum."

=== Legacy ===
Thoreau's description of an encounter with James gives an idea of how his contemporaries saw and judged him:

I met Henry James the other night at Emerson's, at an Alcottian conversation, at which, however, Alcott did not talk much, being disturbed by James's opposition. The latter is a hearty man enough, with whom you can differ very satisfactorily, both on account of his doctrines and his good temper. He utters quasi-philanthropic dogmas in a metaphysic dress; but they are, for all practical purposes, very crude. He charges society with all the crime committed, and praises the criminal for committing it. But I think that all the remedies he suggests out of his head—for he goes no farther, hearty as he is—would leave us about where we are now. For, of course, it is not by a gift of turkeys on Thanksgiving Day that he proposes to convert the criminal, but by a true sympathy with each one,—with him, among the rest, who lying tells the world from the gallows that he has never been treated kindly by a single mortal since he was born. But it is not so easy a thing to sympathize with another, though you may have the best disposition to do it. There is Dobson over the hill. Have not you and I and all the world been trying to sympathize with him since he was born (as doubtless he with us), and yet we have got no further than to send him to the House of Correction once at least; and he, on the other hand, has sent us to another place several times. This is the real state of things as I understand it, at least so far as James's remedies. We are now, alas! exercising what charity we actually have, and new laws would not give us any more. But perchance, we might make some improvements in the House of Correction. You and I are Dobson; what will James do for us?

== Personal life ==
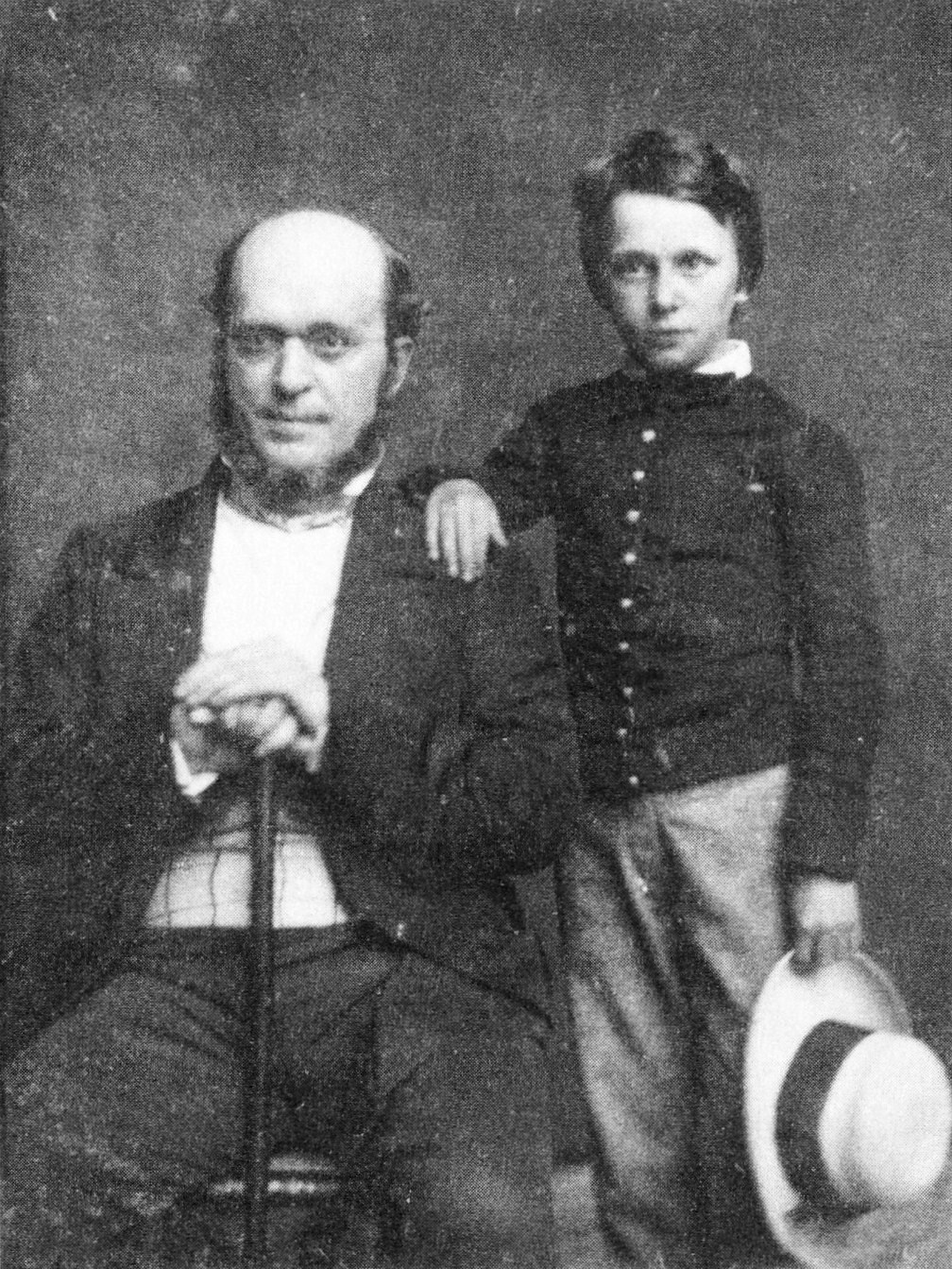
Henry James Sr. and Henry James Jr. – 1854 daguerreotype by Mathew Brady

On July 28, 1840, James was married to Mary Robertson Walsh (1810–1882), the sister of a fellow Princeton seminarian, by the mayor of New York, in his bride's house on Washington Square. The couple lived in New York, and together had five children:

- William James (1842–1910), a philosopher and psychologist, and the first educator to offer a psychology course in the United States.
- Henry James Jr. (1843–1916), an author considered to be among the greatest novelists in the English language who was nominated for the Nobel Prize in Literature in 1911, 1912, and 1916.
- Garth Wilkinson "Wilkie" James (1845–1883), who married Caroline Eames Cary.
- Robertson "Bob" James (1846–1910), who married Mary Lucinda Holton (1849–1922).
- Alice James (1848–1892), a writer who became well known for her diary published posthumously in 1934 with a more complete version published in 1964.

James's marriage was a happy one, and when Mary James died on January 29, 1882, his will to live seemed to die with her. His work on yet another volume flagged, and he fell into a state of indolence. He rallied briefly after visits from his sons, called to his side by his daughter, Alice. But he suffered a relapse after Henry Jr. and William left on excursions to Europe. His famous sons never saw him alive again. He died on December 18, 1882, at his residence on Vernon Street in Boston.

On the same day, his son Henry's boat docked in New York on his way back to see his father. William James, in London at the time, was kept from full knowledge of his father's decline in order not to interfere with a much needed vacation; when he learned that his father was on his deathbed, four days before his final demise, William James wrote a moving letter that his father never read. In it, the famous psychologist wrote:

In that mysterious gulf of the past into which the present will soon fall and go back and back, yours is still for me the central figure. All my intellectual life I derive from you; and though we have often seemed at odds in the expression thereof I'm sure there's a harmony somewhere, & that our strivings will combine. What my debt to you is goes beyond all my power of estimating,—so early, so penetrating and so constant has been the influence. ... Good night my sacred old Father. If I don't see you again—Farewell! a blessed farewell!

Henry Sr. made Henry Jr. the executor of his estate, which caused resentment from his eldest son William. Under the terms of his will, Wilkie received a smaller share of the estate than his siblings, because his father felt that he had advanced enough money to him in his lifetime which had been lost in failed business ventures. However, Henry, Alice and Bob felt badly about Wilkie, who suffered from a heart condition and rheumatic fever after injuries incurred in the Civil War, so they decided to redistribute the estate equally. William strongly disagreed with this, arguing that it was easier for Alice and Henry to forfeit a larger share of the estate to Wilkie because they did not have families of their own to support. The matter had not been resolved when Wilkie died in November 1883, less than a year after his father.

== Bibliography ==
- Moralism and Christianity; or Man's Experience and Destiny (1850), AMS Press reprint: ISBN 0-404-10084-8
- Lectures and Miscellanies (1852)
- The Church of Christ Not an Ecclesiasticism (1854) AMS Press 1983 reprint: ISBN 0-404-10082-1
- The Nature of Evil, Considered in a Letter to the Rev. Edward Beecher, D.D., Author of "The Conflict of Ages" (1855) AMS Press 1983 reprint ISBN 0-404-10086-4
- Christianity the Logic of Creation (1857) AMS Press 1983 reprint: ISBN 0-404-10080-5
- The Social Significance of Our Institutions (1861)
- Substance and Shadow; or Morality and Religion in Their Relation to Life (1863) AMS Press 1983 reprint: ISBN 0-404-10088-0
- The Secret of Swedenborg, Being an Elucidation of His Doctrine of the Divine Natural Humanity (1869) AMS Press 1983 reprint: ISBN 0-404-10087-2
- Society the Redeemed Form of Man, and the Earnest of God's Omnipotence in Human Nature, Affirmed in Letters to a Friend (1879)
- The Literary Remains of Henry James (1885), edited by his son, William James. Literature House 1970 reprint: ISBN 0-8398-0950-6

== See also ==
- American philosophy
- List of American philosophers
