= Mastery Charter School Mann Elementary =

- William B. Mann School
- U.S. National Register of Historic Places
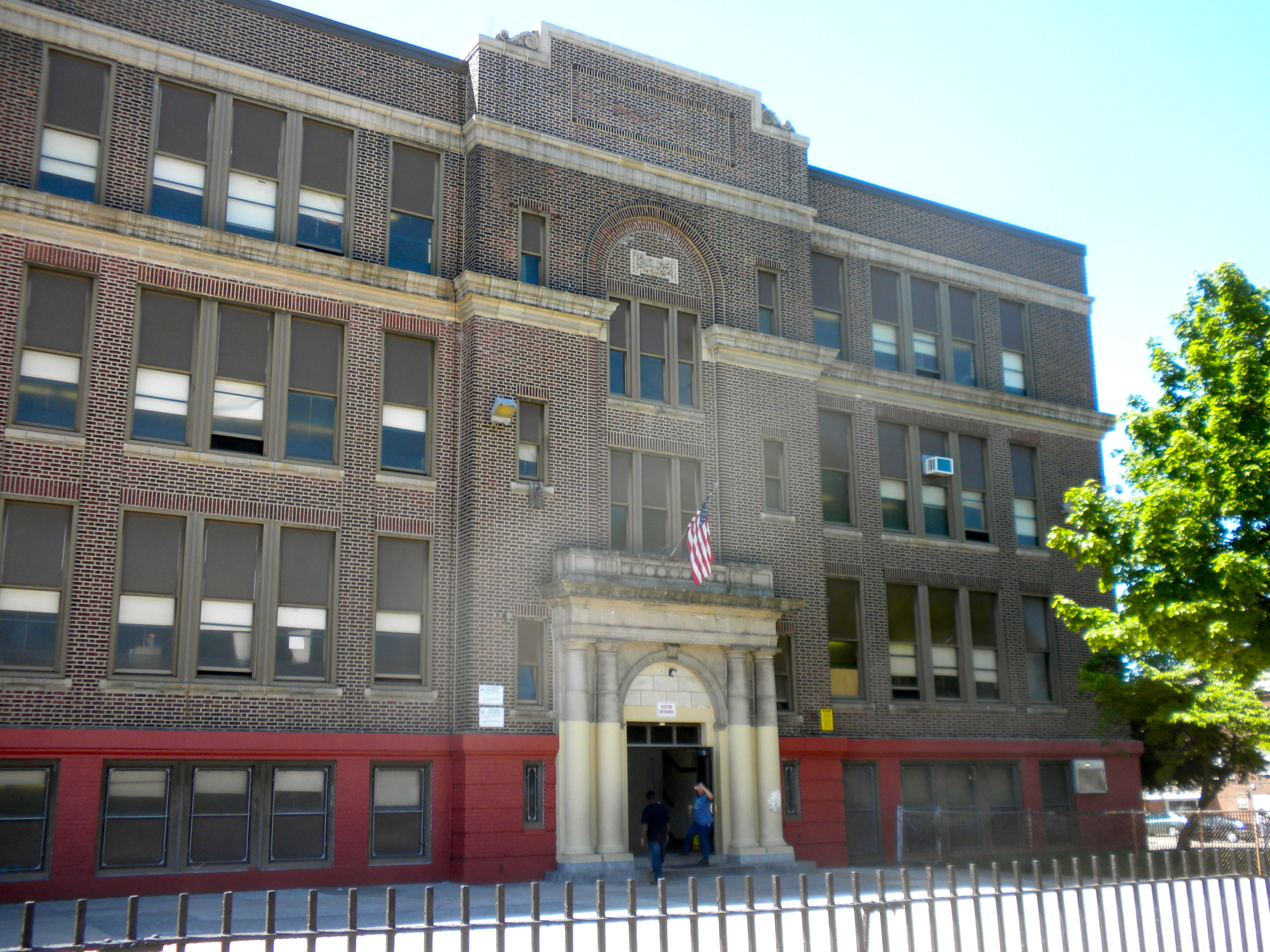
- William B. Mann School, June 2010

- Location within Philadelphia Location within Pennsylvania Location within the United States
- Location: 5376 West Berks St., Philadelphia, Pennsylvania
- Coordinates: 39.9857°N 75.2313°W
- Area: 4 acres (1.6 ha)
- Built: 1923–1924
- Architect: Irwin T. Catharine
- Architectural style: Colonial Revival
- MPS: Philadelphia Public Schools TR
- NRHP reference No.: 88002297
- Added to NRHP: November 18, 1988

The Mastery Charter School Mann Elementary, formerly known as the William B. Mann School, is a historic American school in the Wynnefield neighborhood of Philadelphia, Pennsylvania. It is a charter school run by Mastery Charter Schools.

== History and architectural features ==
The building was designed by Irwin T. Catharine and built between 1923 and 1924. It is a three-story, nine-bay by five-bay, brick building that sits on a raised basement. Designed in the Colonial Revival style, it features large stone arch surrounds on the first level, a projecting entrance pavilion, a double stone cornice, and brick parapet that is topped by stone coping. The building was added to the National Register of Historic Places in 1988.

It was named for Philadelphia lawyer William B. Mann (1816-1896).
