= Belmont Village, Philadelphia =

Belmont Village
- Neighborhood of Philadelphia
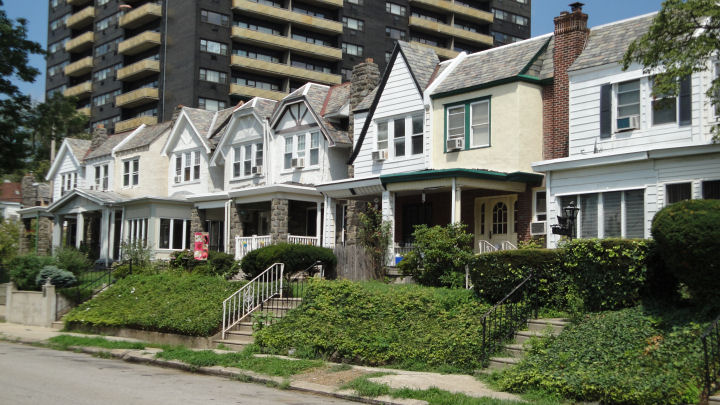
- Tudor-inspired homes on Sherwood Rd, Belmont Village

- Location within Philadelphia
- Coordinates: 40°00′04″N 75°13′21″W
- Country: United States
- State: Pennsylvania
- County: Philadelphia
- City: Philadelphia
- Area codes: 215, 267 and 445

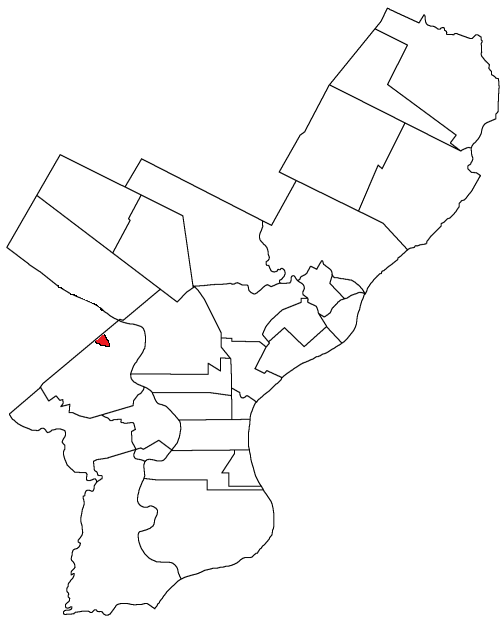
Map of Belmont Village

Belmont Village is a middle class neighborhood located in the West Philadelphia section of Philadelphia, Pennsylvania, United States. The zip code is 19131.

Known as Blockley in the early 1900s, when developers first built homes in the area, the region now comprises Overbrook, Wynnefield, Belmont Village, and Wynnefield Heights. In Belmont Village, the homes have stone facing on Lenape Road, while on nearby Conshohocken Avenue, the homes have an opulent Spanish Revival-style.

In the early 20th-century, John McClatchy shaped the look of many Philadelphia neighborhoods, including Belmont Village. McClatchy advertised the development at the time as located in Bala, and it is close to Bala station on the Cynwyd Regional Rail line, but is actually in the city’s Belmont Village section.

== Boundaries ==
Belmont Village encompasses the area from City Avenue to the north, Fairmount Park to the south, the Bala Golf Club to the west, and Belmont Avenue to the east.

Belmont Village is separated from its closest neighbor to the west, Wynnefield, by the grounds of the Bala Golf Club and SEPTA’s Cynwyd Line (formerly the R6). Belmont Village is separated from its closest neighbor to the east, Wynnefield Heights, by the Belmont Water Treatment Facility. Belmont Village borders Fairmount Park to its south. Its northern border is City Avenue.

Along with East Falls and Manayunk, Belmont Village is part of Pennsylvania House of Representatives, District 194 and Pennsylvania Senate, District 7. The civic association for the neighborhood is the Belmont Village Community Association.

== Demographics ==
According the U.S. Census from the 2019 American Community Survey 5-Year Estimates, the total population of 19131, which include Overbrook, Wynnfield, Belmont Village, and Wynnefield Heights, was 44,723 where 44.5% is male and 55.5% is female. Per the 2019 U.S. Census data, the community is 82.2% African-American, 13.4% Caucasian, 4.1% Asian/Pacific Islander, and 3.6% Hispanic/Latino.

The mean household income in the past 12 months (in 2019 inflation-adjusted dollars) was $49,724.

Of the 21,361 total housing units located in the 19131 zip code per 2019 Census data, 8,544 or 48.8% are owner-occupied units.

== Transportation ==
Belmont Village is accessible to Center City via West River Drive and SEPTA’s Cynwyd Line. The Bala Station sits directly across the street from the northern end of Belmont Village. The neighborhood is also accessible to several major roadways such as Route 1, I-76, and I-95.

== Education ==
Belmont Village is served by the Philadelphia School District. Students in the neighborhood attend William B. Mann Elementary School. In May 2010, after years of failing to meet state standards, the School District turned operation of Mann over to Mastery Charter Schools. Mann will continue to be run as a neighborhood school and is one of Mastery's first elementary schools.

The area high school is Overbrook High School.

Belmont Village is close to a number of private elementary and secondary schools, including Friends' Central School on City Avenue. Two colleges also flank Belmont Village, the Philadelphia College of Osteopathic Medicine (PCOM) to the east and Saint Joseph's University to the west.

== Local points of interest ==
Along Belmont Village's northern border is the City Avenue Business District, home to several stores and restaurants. The Bala-Cynwyd Shopping Center is located across City Avenue from Belmont Village and contains a department store, a large grocery store, shops, and restaurants.

Along Belmont Village's southern border is Fairmount Park, which contains points of interest such as the Carousel House and the Mann Center for the Performing Arts. Nearby East Parkside is home of the Philadelphia Zoo and Memorial Hall/Please Touch Museum.

Every July, the Greek Picnic draws over 100,000 people to an adjacent area of Fairmount Park, celebrating African-American college fraternities and sororities.

== Gallery ==
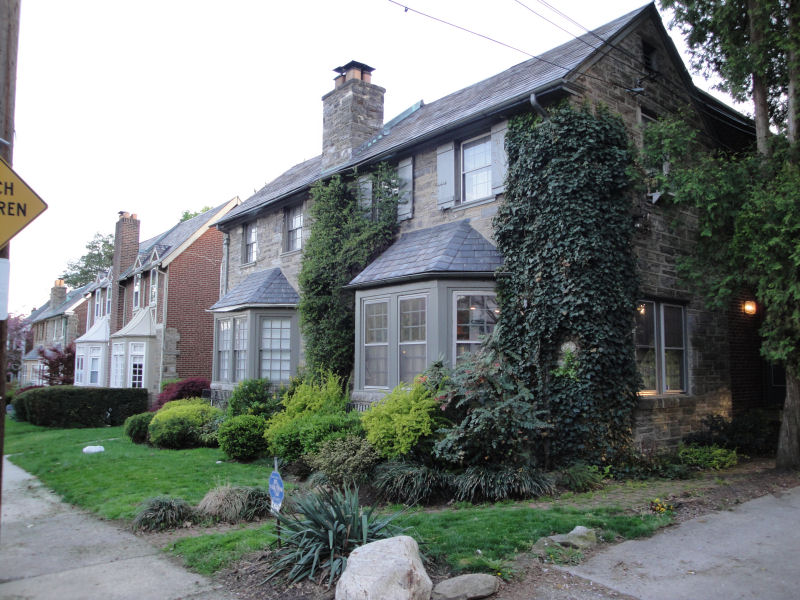
Stone Twin on Lenape Rd

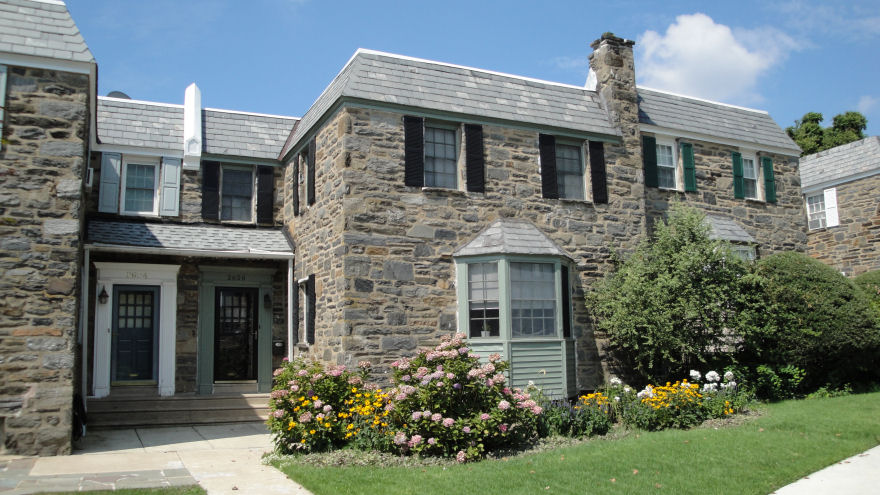
Stone Row on Lenape Rd

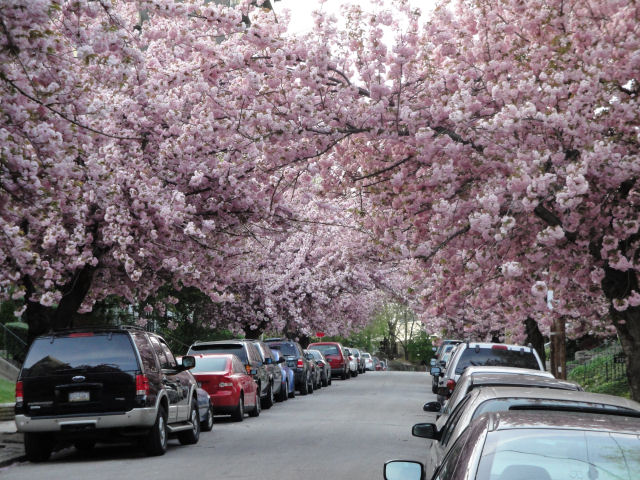
46th Street in full bloom

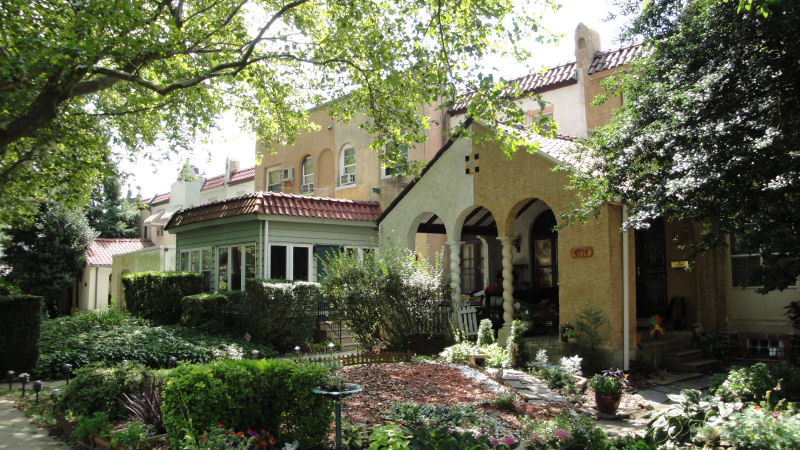
Spanish-inspired homes on Conshohocken Ave

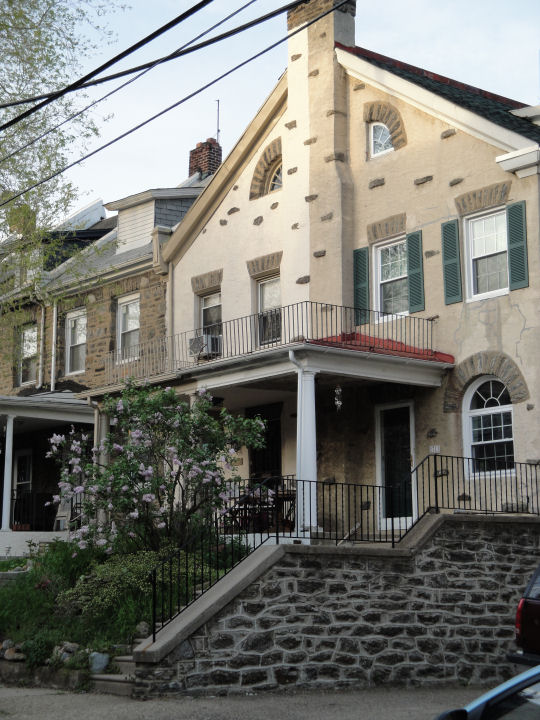
Stucco Twin on 46th St
