= Mastery Schools =

Charter school network in the United States

Coordinates: 40.03170°N 75.17911°W

Mastery Schools is a network of 24 charter schools with over 14,000 students in Philadelphia, Pennsylvania and Camden, New Jersey. It is headquartered at the Mastery Charter Pickett Campus in Germantown, Philadelphia.

The Mastery Charter Schools Foundation has EIN 20-5593485 as a 501(c)(3) Public Charity based in Philadelphia. In 2024, it claimed total revenue of $9,018,682 and total assets of $115,413,557.

== Overview ==
Mastery began in 2001 with the Brook J. Lenfest Campus.

== Schools ==
Elementary Schools

- Grover Cleveland Elementary (K–8)
- Clymer Elementary (K–6)
- Cramer Hill Elementary (K–8)
- Frederick Douglass Elementary (K–8)
- Hardy Williams Elementary (K-6)
- Harrity Elementary (K–8)
- Mann Elementary (K–6)
- McGraw Elementary (K–5)
- Molina Elementary (K–8)
- Pastorius-Richardson Elementary (K–8)
- Smedley Elementary (K–6)
- Thomas Elementary (K–6)
- Hardy Williams Elementary (K–6)
- John Wister Elementary (K–5)

Middle Schools

- East Camden Middle School (6–8)
- Mastery Charter Prep Middle School (7–8)

High Schools

- Mastery High School of Camden (9–12)
- Simon Gratz (9–12)
- Lenfest Campus (7–12)
- Pickett Campus (6–12)
- Shoemaker Campus (7–12)
- Thomas Campus (7–12)
- Hardy Williams High (7–12)
