= Humfry Payne =

British archaeologist (1902–1936)

- Humfry Payne
- Born: 19 February 1902; Wendover, England
- Died: 9 May 1936 (aged 34); Athens, Greece
- Scientific career
- Fields: Archaeologist

External image
- Portrait of Payne by Ithell Colquhoun, 1935, at the National Portrait Gallery

Humfry Gilbert Garth Payne (19 February 1902 – 9 May 1936) was an English archaeologist, director of the British School at Athens from 1929 to his death.

== Personal ==
Born at Wendover, Buckinghamshire, Payne was one of three children, the only son, of the historian Edward John Payne, fellow of University College Oxford, and Emma Leonora Helena (née Pertz).

He attended Westminster School and afterwards Christ Church, Oxford where he was awarded first class honours in classical Mods (1922) and Greats (1924). In 1926, he married the journalist Dilys Powell.

Payne was the younger brother of the astronomer Cecilia Payne-Gaposchkin (1900–1979).

== Career ==
A research studentship at Christ Church (1926 to 1931) and an assistantship in the department of antiquities at the Ashmolean Museum (1926 to 1928) followed, during which he researched in Mediterranean archaeology. Payne received the Conington Prize for classical learning in 1927 for work on painted Greek pottery. He was a student of John Beazley, known for his work on classical vase-painting, and worked with Alan Blakeway, and they published joint papers on black-figured Attic pottery excavated at Naucratis. There were large collections of vase material from Corinthia, Payne took up the challenge of studying and collating the information which he published in 1931 as Necrocorinthia, which was admired and made his name throughout the archaeological world.

Payne spent summer archaeological excavation seasons 1927–1929 on Crete, around Knossos where Arthur Evans was working. In 1929, his work had been recognised when he was appointed as the director of the British School of Archaeology in Athens. He then, in 1930, instigated the dig at Perachora, a settlement on the Gerania peninsula on the Gulf of Corinth. There, the sanctuary and harbour sites were to be dug from 1930 to 1933, and later in 1939 and in the 1960s. This work was written up as Perachora: the sanctuaries of Hera Akraia and Limenia, mostly by Payne, edited by Thomas Dunbabin to be published in 1940; a second volume was to be published in 1962.

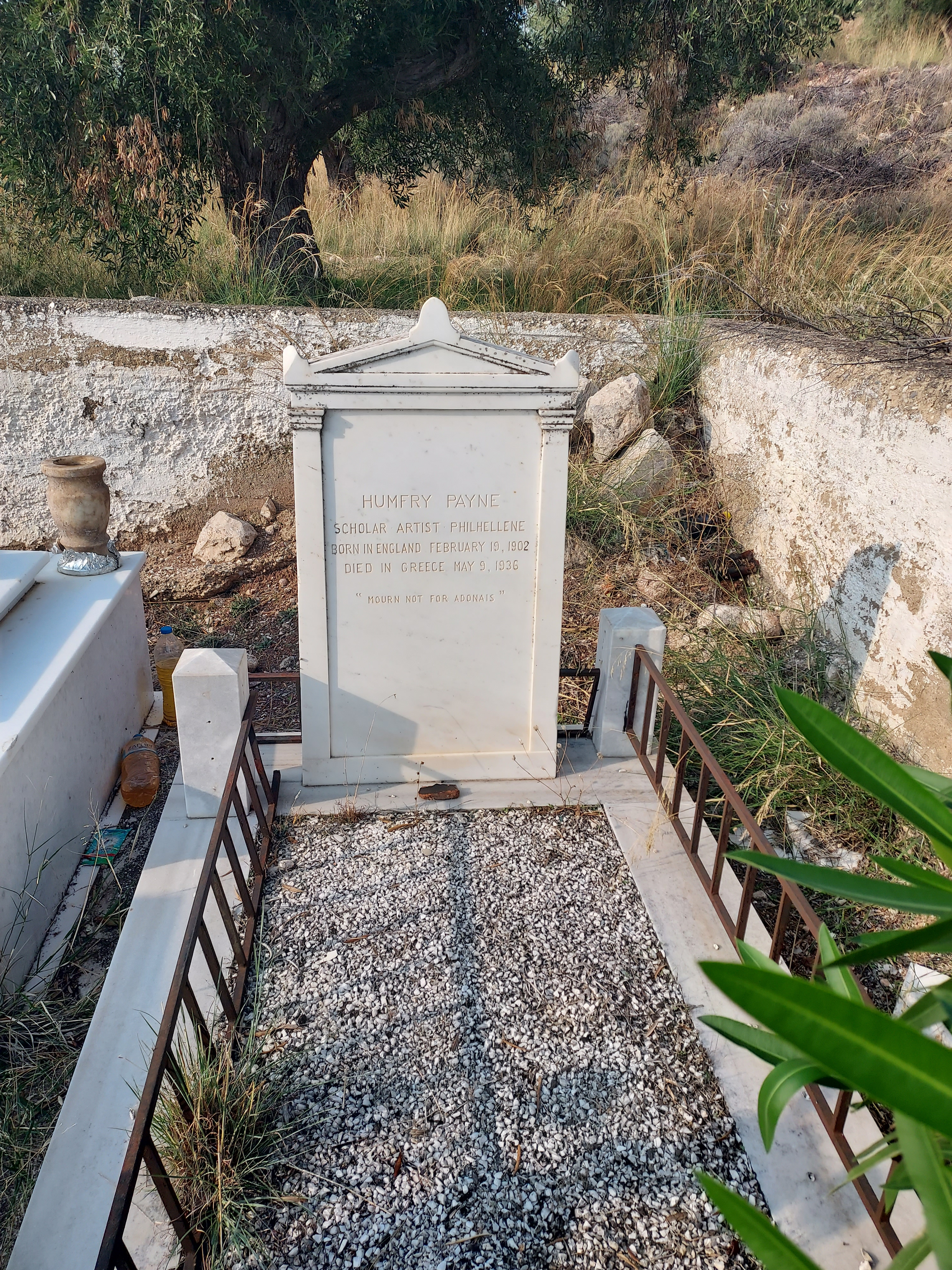
The Grave of Humfry Payne at Mycenae

He also worked on archaic sculptures which had been found at the Acropolis of Athens 50 years earlier. This work, published in 1936 as Archaic marble sculpture from the Acropolis was to confirm his reputation. It changed views on the origin of many pieces; for example it identified potential reunions of sculptured parts in French museums with other parts in the Acropolis Museum. His career came to an early end when he died from an infection of staphylococcus in the Evangelismos Hospital in Athens. He was 34 years old.

He is buried in the cemetery of Agios Georgios (St George) at Mycenae where his tombstone bears the words Mourn not for Adonais, a quotation from Percy Bysshe Shelley's poem Adonais, an elegy for John Keats.

== Written works ==
- Necrocorinthia: a study of Corinthian art in the archaic period. (1931), Oxford: Clarendon Press.
- Archaic marble sculpture from the Acropolis, (1936), Manchester: Cresset Press (with Gerard Mackworth Young).
- Perachora: the sanctuaries of Hera Akraia and Limenia, (1940), Oxford: Clarendon Press (ed T J Dunbabin).
- Protokorinthische Vasenmalerei, (1974), Mainz: Verlag Philipp von Zabern, (reprint).

== Sources ==
- Obituary, The Times, 11 May 1936, pg 17.
- Oxford Dictionary of National Biography. OUP (2004).
