= Wynnestay =

Historic house in Pennsylvania, United States

- U.S. National Register of Historic Places
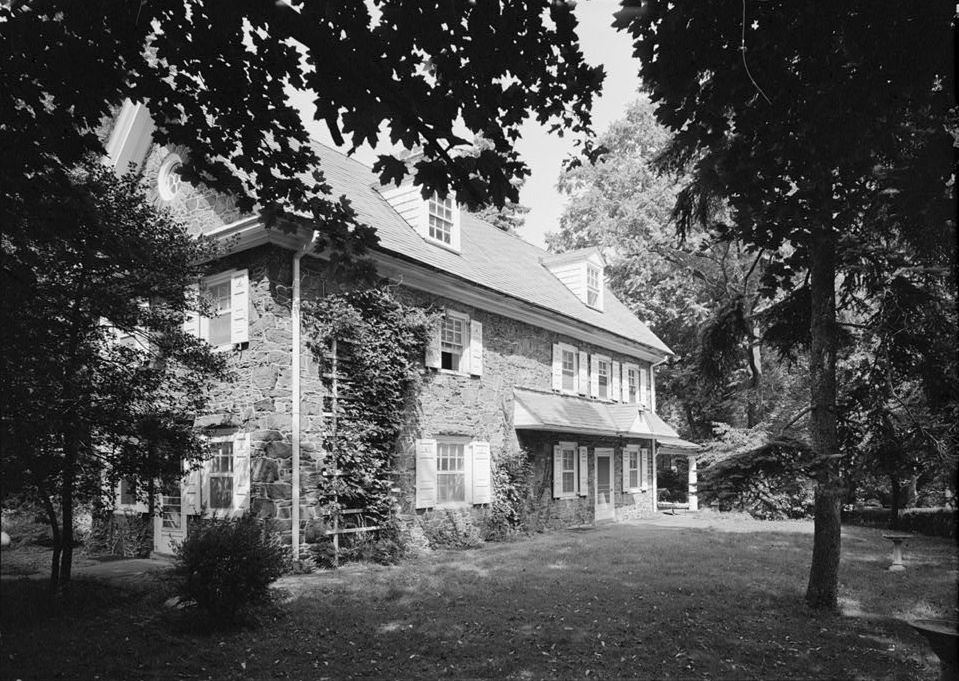
- (1973 photograph)

- Location within Philadelphia Location within Pennsylvania Location within the United States
- Location: 5125 Woodbine Ave., Philadelphia, Pennsylvania
- Coordinates: 39°59′38.5″N 75°13′49.5″W
- Area: less than one acre
- Built: 1689, 1904
- Architect: Walter Smedley
- Architectural style: Colonial Revival
- NRHP reference No.: 08001270
- Added to NRHP: December 30, 2008

Wynnestay or Wynnstay is an historic residence that is one of the oldest extant houses located in Philadelphia, Pennsylvania, United States.

It was added to the National Register of Historic Places in 2008 and is available for touring by appointment only.

== History and architectural features ==
This two-and-a-half-story house was built in 1689 as the residence of Dr. Thomas Wynne, the personal physician of William Penn, the founder of Pennsylvania. Wynne was also the first Speaker of the Pennsylvania Provincial Assembly.

The land surrounding Wynnestay was developed starting around 1895 with the encouragement of Pennsylvania Railroad President George B. Roberts, and the building of the nearby Wynnefield Station. The house was extensively renovated in 1904, with the addition of a large ell that was designed by Walter Smedley.
