= Cecilia Payne-Gaposchkin =

British-American astronomer (1900–1979)

Cecilia Payne-Gaposchkin FRAS
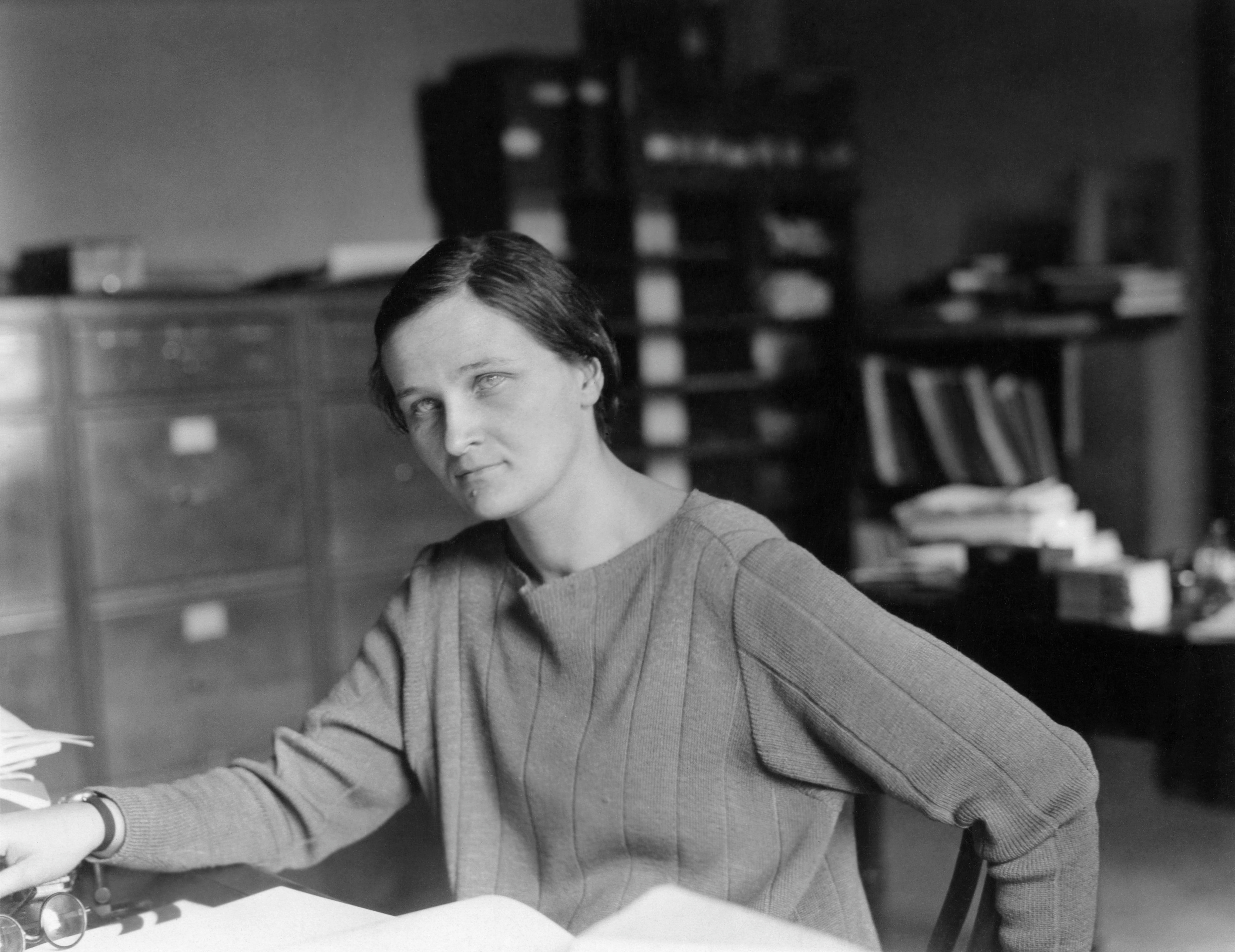
- Born: Cecilia Helena Payne; May 10, 1900; Wendover, Buckinghamshire, England
- Died: December 7, 1979 (aged 79); Cambridge, Massachusetts, U.S.
- Citizenship: British; United States (from 1931)
- Education: Newnham College, Cambridge; Harvard University
- Known for: Explanation of stellar spectra and composition of the Sun, more than 3,000,000 observations of variable stars
- Spouse: Sergei Illarionovich Gaposchkin (m. 1934)
- Children: 3
- Relatives: Georg Heinrich Pertz (great uncle); James John Garth Wilkinson (great uncle); Edward John Payne (father); Humfry Payne (brother)
- Awards: Annie Jump Cannon Award in Astronomy (1934), Rittenhouse Medal (1961), Award of Merit from Radcliffe College (1952), Henry Norris Russell Prize (1976)
- Scientific career
- Fields: Astronomy, astrophysics
- Workplaces: Harvard College Observatory, Harvard University
- Thesis: Stellar Atmospheres: A contribution to the observational study of high temperature in the reversing layers of stars (1925)
- Doctoral advisor: Harlow Shapley
- Doctoral students: Helen Sawyer Hogg, Joseph Ashbrook, Frank Kameny, Frank Drake, Paul W. Hodge

Cecilia Payne-Gaposchkin (born Cecilia Helena Payne; May 10, 1900 – December 7, 1979) was a British-born American astronomer and astrophysicist. Her work on the cosmic makeup of the universe and the nature of variable stars was foundational to modern astrophysics.

She determined that stars were composed primarily of hydrogen and helium in her 1925 doctoral thesis. Her groundbreaking conclusion was initially rejected by leading astrophysicists, including Henry Norris Russell, because it contradicted the science of the time, which held that no significant elemental differences distinguished the Sun and Earth. Independent observations eventually proved that she was correct.

Despite completing her studies, because she was a woman Payne was not eligible to receive a degree from the University of Cambridge. Similarly in America, she was not eligible to receive a doctoral degree (PhD) for her studies at Harvard University, as the university did not grant doctoral degrees to women at the time. Instead, she received her doctoral degree from Radcliffe College – a liberal arts college for women that began as a study program for women within Harvard. She would go on to overcome barriers for women that she encountered in science and her success opened the door for countless women astronomers, including her Harvard colleague, Helen Sawyer Hogg.

While she was a student at Cambridge, Payne was elected to the Royal Astronomical Society. Later, she became the first recipient of the American Astronomical Society’s prestigious Annie Jump Cannon Award in Astronomy. In 1956, she was the first woman appointed as a professor and as a department chair at Harvard.

Her work resulted in several published books, including The Stars of High Luminosity (1930), Variable Stars (1938), and Variable Stars and Galactic Structure (1954).

== Early life ==
Cecilia Helena Payne, born in Wendover in Buckinghamshire, England, was one of three children born to Emma Leonora Helena (née Pertz), from an erudite Prussian family, and Edward John Payne, a London barrister. Her father was a historian and musician who had been an Oxford fellow. Payne had two distinguished uncles, historian Georg Heinrich Pertz and the Swedenborgian writer James John Garth Wilkinson. When Cecilia was four, her father died, leaving her mother to raise the family on her own.

== Education ==
Payne began her formal education in Wendover at a private school run by Elizabeth Edwards. When Payne was twelve, her family moved to London to facilitate the education of her brother, Humfry; he later became an archaeologist. Payne initially attended St. Mary's College, Paddington, where study of mathematics or science was not available to her. In 1918, she transferred to St. Paul's Girls' School, where her music teacher, Gustav Holst, encouraged her to pursue a career in music. However, Payne decided to focus on science. The following year she won a scholarship covering her expenses at Newnham College, Cambridge University, where she studied physics and chemistry.

Her interest in astronomy began after she attended a lecture by Arthur Eddington, detailing his 1919 expedition to the island of Príncipe in the Gulf of Guinea off the west coast of Africa to observe and photograph the stars near a solar eclipse as a test of Albert Einstein's general theory of relativity. She said of the lecture: "The result was a complete transformation of my world picture. [...] My world had been so shaken that I experienced something very like a nervous breakdown." Although she completed her studies, she did not receive an official degree because Cambridge did not grant degrees to women until 1948.

Payne realized that her only career option in the U.K. was to become a teacher, so she looked for grants that would enable her to move to the United States. Leslie Comrie, then a PhD student at Cambridge University, introduced her to Harlow Shapley, the director of the Harvard College Observatory, after a lecture in London at the British Astronomical Association. A fellowship established to encourage women to study at the Harvard Observatory enabled Payne to move to the United States to study at Harvard College in 1923. Adelaide Ames had been the first recipient of this fellowship in 1922, with Payne following as the second.

Lawrence H. Aller later described Payne as one of the "most capable go-getters" in Shapley's observatory. She then studied related courses at Harvard via the program for women and Shapley persuaded Payne to write a doctoral dissertation on a topic in astronomy.

=== Doctoral thesis ===
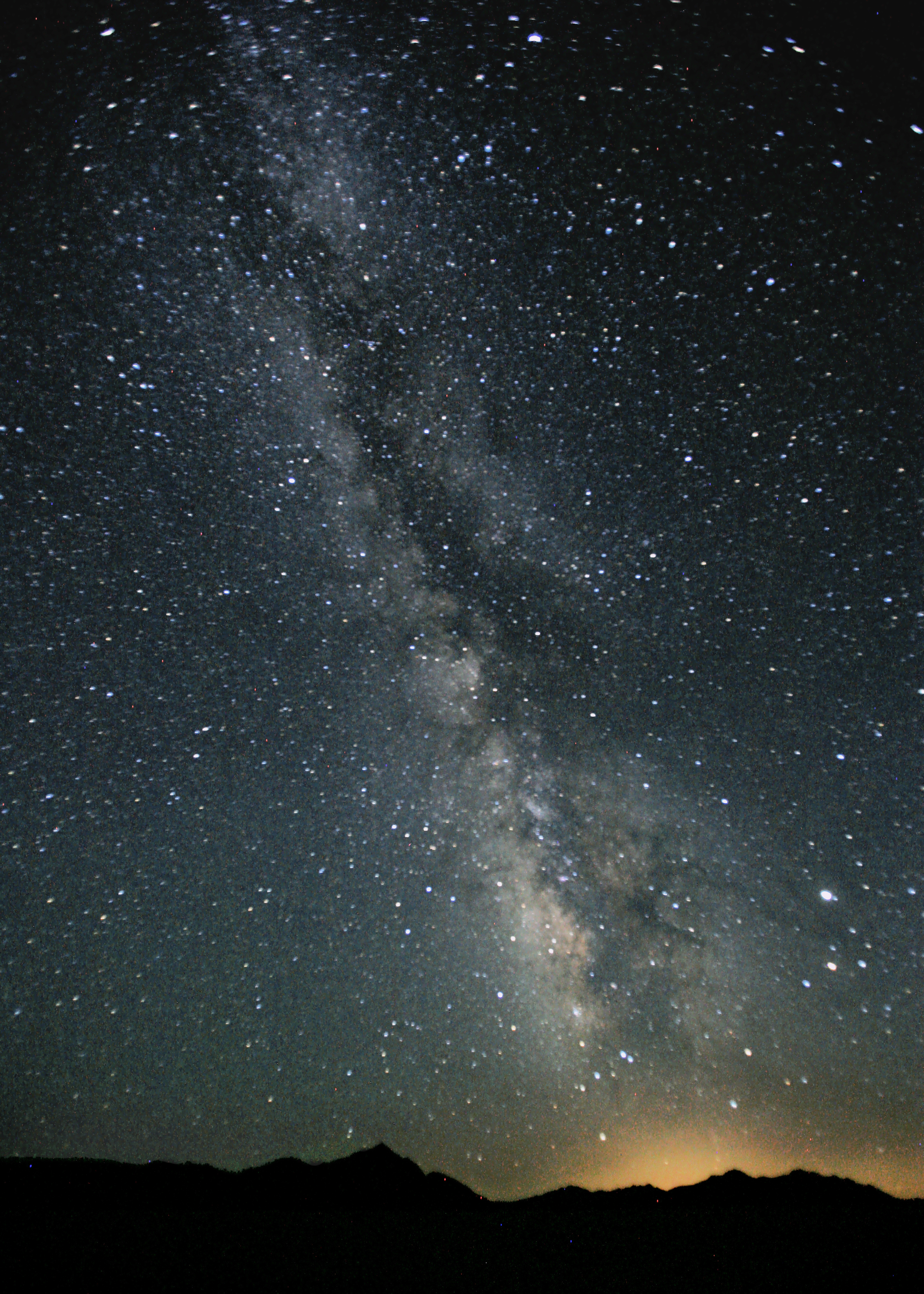
Ratios of hydrogen and helium measured in the Milky Way galaxy match Payne-Gaposchkin's 1925 calculations

In 1925, Payne became the first person to earn a doctoral degree (PhD) in astronomy from Radcliffe College of Harvard University. Her thesis was Stellar Atmospheres; A Contribution to the Observational Study of High Temperature in the Reversing Layers of Stars.

While analyzing glass plates at the Harvard College Observatory, Payne made a groundbreaking discovery by accurately relating the spectral classes of stars to their measured temperatures using Indian physicist Meghnad Saha's ionization theory. She demonstrated that the great variation in stellar absorption lines was due to differing amounts of ionization at different temperatures, not to varying amounts of elements. Payne found that silicon, carbon, and several common metals seen in the Sun's spectrum were present in about the same relative amounts as on Earth, which aligned with the prevailing belief that stars had a similar elemental composition as on Earth, however, she found that helium, and particularly hydrogen, were vastly more abundant in stars, with hydrogen being about a million times more prevalent. This discovery was the basis of her conclusion that hydrogen was the overwhelming constituent of stars, making it the most abundant element in the Universe.

During the review process of Payne's dissertation, Henry Norris Russell, a pre-eminent astronomer of the day who adhered to the theories of American physicist Henry Rowland, urged her not to assert that the composition of the Sun was predominantly hydrogen, however, because it contradicted the scientific consensus of the time that the elemental composition of the Sun and the Earth were similar. Russell, in a 1914 article, had argued that:

The agreement of the solar and terrestrial lists is such as to confirm very strongly Rowland's opinion that, if the Earth's crust should be raised to the temperature of the Sun's atmosphere, it would give a very similar absorption spectrum. The spectra of the Sun and other stars were similar, so it appeared that the relative abundance of elements in the universe was like that in Earth's crust.

Consequently, Russell described her scientific conclusion as "spurious". Although she included all calculations and results, Payne accommodated the criticism of her reviewer by including a statement in her thesis that her results were "almost certainly not real".

Four years later, however, Russell realized that Payne had been correct when he derived the same results by different means, effectively demonstrating that hydrogen and helium were the most abundant elements in the Milky Way, just as Payne had concluded in her thesis. Sharing his results professionally in 1929, Russell briefly acknowledged Payne's earlier work and discovery, including the mention that "[t]he most important previous determination of the abundance of the elements by astrophysical means is that by Miss Payne [...]", yet Russell was generally credited for the conclusions Payne had reached four years prior.

Nearly 40 years after Payne's thesis was published, professional recognition of her discovery was given to her by astronomer Otto Struve when he described her work as "the most brilliant PhD thesis ever written in astronomy". Today's accepted ratios for hydrogen and helium in the Milky Way Galaxy are ~74% hydrogen and ~24% helium, confirming the results of Payne-Gaposchkin's calculations from 1925.

Her work also resulted in several published books, including The Stars of High Luminosity (1930), Variable Stars (1938), and Variable Stars and Galactic Structure (1954).

== Career ==
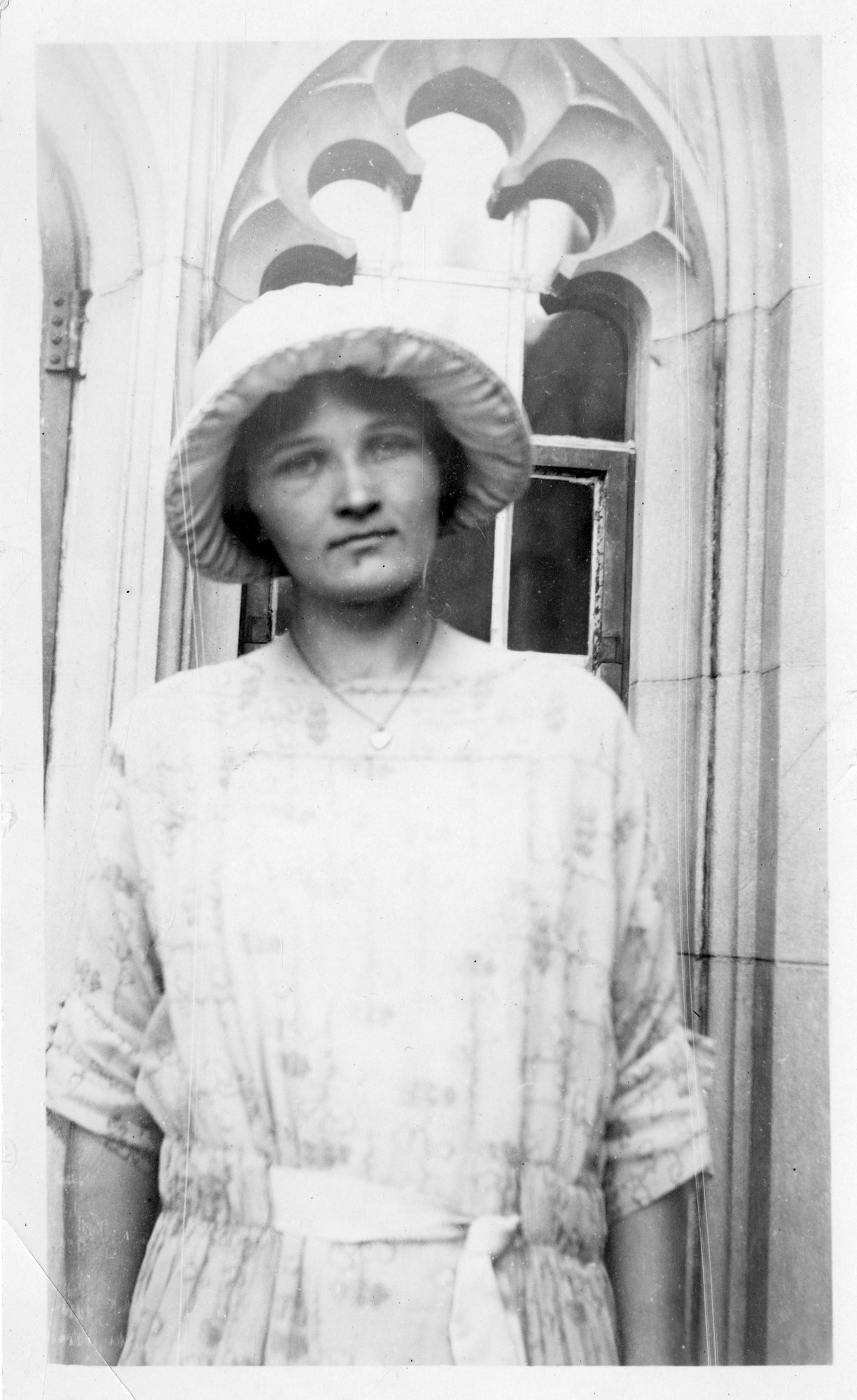
Payne-Gaposchkin at the Harvard College Observatory

After earning her doctorate in 1925, Payne remained at Harvard for the entirety of her academic career. Initially, women were barred from becoming professors at Harvard, so she spent years doing less prestigious, low-paid research. Her early work focused on stars of high luminosity and seeking to understand the structure of the Milky Way.

Later, she surveyed all stars brighter than the tenth magnitude. She then studied variable stars, making more than 1,250,000 observations with her assistants. This work later was extended to the Magellanic Clouds, adding a further 2,000,000 observations of variable stars. These data were used to determine the paths of stellar evolution. She published her conclusions in her second book, The Stars of High Luminosity (1930).

On a tour through Europe in 1933, Payne met Russian-born astrophysicist Sergei Illarionovich Gaposchkin in Germany. She helped him obtain a visa to the United States, where they married in March 1934. Her observations and analysis of variable stars, carried out with Sergei Gaposchkin, laid the basis for all subsequent work on such objects.

Harlow Shapley (the Director of the Harvard College Observatory) had made efforts to improve her position, and in 1938 she was given the title of "Astronomer". In order to get approval for her title, Shapley had assured the university that giving Payne-Gaposchkin this position would not make her equivalent to a professor. Payne later requested that her title be changed to "Phillips Astronomer", an endowed position that would make her an "officer of the university" and Shapley pushed privately for the position to be converted into an explicit professorship as the "Phillips Professor of Astronomy".

Payne-Gaposchkin was elected a Fellow of the American Academy of Arts and Sciences in 1943.

Nonetheless, the courses she taught were not recorded as available in the Harvard University catalogue until 1945.

When Donald Menzel became director of the Harvard College Observatory in 1954, he tried to improve her appointment, and in 1956 she became the first woman to be promoted to full professor from within the faculty at Harvard's Faculty of Arts and Sciences. She was appointed the Phillips Professor of Astronomy in 1958. Later, with her appointment to the Chair of the Department of Astronomy, she also became the first woman to head a department at Harvard.^{[14]}

Her students included Joseph Ashbrook, Frank Drake, Harlan Smith, and Paul W. Hodge, all of whom made important contributions to astronomy. She also supervised Helen Sawyer Hogg, Frank Kameny and Owen Gingerich.

Payne-Gaposchkin retired from active teaching in 1966 and subsequently, was appointed Professor Emerita of Harvard. She continued her research as a member of staff at the Smithsonian Astrophysical Observatory, as well as editing the journals and books published by Harvard Observatory for ten years. She edited and published the lectures of Walter Baade, Evolution of Stars and Galaxies (1963).

== Legacy ==
Payne-Gaposchkin's career marked a turning point at Harvard College Observatory. Under the direction of Harlow Shapley and Dr. E. J. Sheridan (whom Payne-Gaposchkin described as a mentor) the observatory already had offered more opportunities in astronomy to women than did other institutions. This was evident in the achievements accomplished earlier in the century by Williamina Fleming, Antonia Maury, Annie Jump Cannon, and Henrietta Swan Leavitt. However, with Payne's PhD, women entered the mainstream.

The trail she blazed into the largely male-dominated scientific community was an inspiration to many. For example, she became a role model for astrophysicist Joan Feynman. Feynman's mother and grandmother had dissuaded her from pursuing science, since they believed women were not physically capable of understanding scientific concepts. Feynman was inspired by Payne-Gaposchkin when she came across her work in an astronomy textbook. Seeing Payne-Gaposchkin's published research convinced Feynman that she could, in fact, follow her scientific passions.

While accepting the Henry Norris Russell Prize from the American Astronomical Society, Payne spoke of her lifelong passion for research: "The reward of the young scientist is the emotional thrill of being the first person in the history of the world to see something or understand something. Nothing can compare with that experience [...] The reward of the old scientist is the sense of having seen a vague sketch grow into a masterly landscape."

== Personal life ==
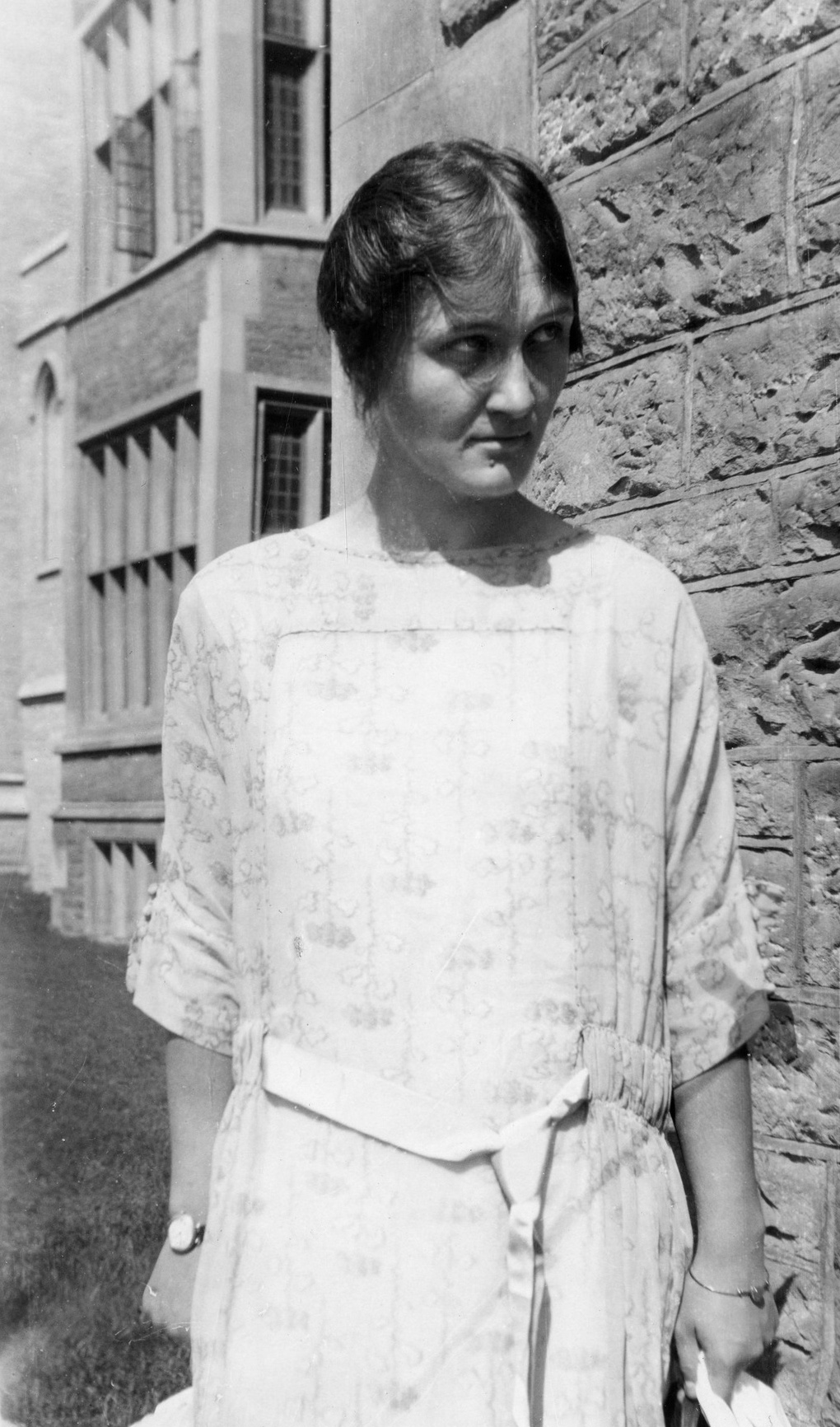
Payne-Gaposchkin

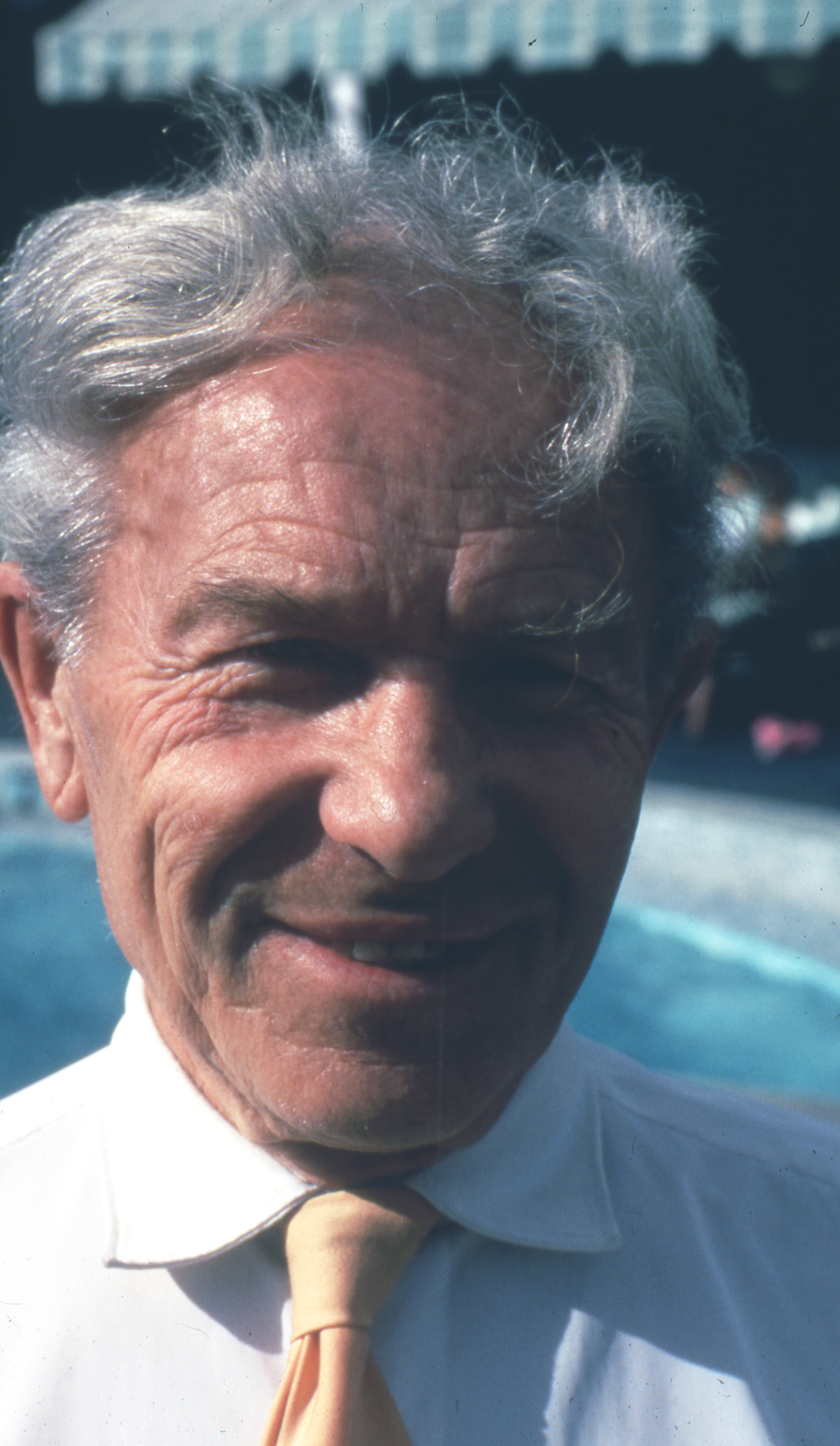
Sergei Gaposchkin in 1970

In her autobiography, Payne said that while in school she created an experiment on the efficacy of prayer by dividing her exams in two groups, praying for success only on one, the other one being a scientific control group. She achieved the higher marks in the latter group. Later on, she became an agnostic.

In 1931, Payne became a United States citizen, so she held joint citizenship of both the UK and the US. On a tour through Europe in 1933, she met Russian-born astrophysicist Sergei Illarionovich Gaposchkin (1898-1984) in Germany. She helped him get a visa to the United States. They married in March 1934, settling in Lexington, Massachusetts, a short commute from Harvard. Payne added her husband's name to her own and the Payne-Gaposchkins had three children: Edward, Katherine, and Peter. Payne's daughter remembers her as "an inspired seamstress, an inventive knitter, and a voracious reader". Payne and her family were members of the First Unitarian Church in Lexington, where Cecilia taught Sunday school. She was also active with the Quakers.

During the World War II years, work at the observatory was virtually stopped, but Payne and her husband continued, often taking their children with them to work. They lived in Lexington, while on a small farm they had near Townsend, a neighbour helped them raise pigs and poultry and to deliver meat and eggs to local markets.

She died at her home in Cambridge, Massachusetts, on December 7, 1979, aged 79. Shortly before her death, Payne had her autobiography privately printed as The Dyer's Hand. It was reprinted later as, Cecilia Payne-Gaposchkin: An Autobiography and Other Recollections.

Payne's younger brother, archaeologist Humfry Payne (1902–1936), who married author and film critic Dilys Powell, became director of the British School of Archaeology at Athens, where he died in 1936, aged 34. Payne's granddaughter, Cecilia Gaposchkin, is a professor of late medieval cultural history and French history at Dartmouth College, New Hampshire.

Payne-Gaposchkin's children also became scientists like their parents. Katherine Haramundanis and Peter John Arthur Gaposchkin became astronomers. Edward Michael Gaposchkin became a computer scientist and a geologist.

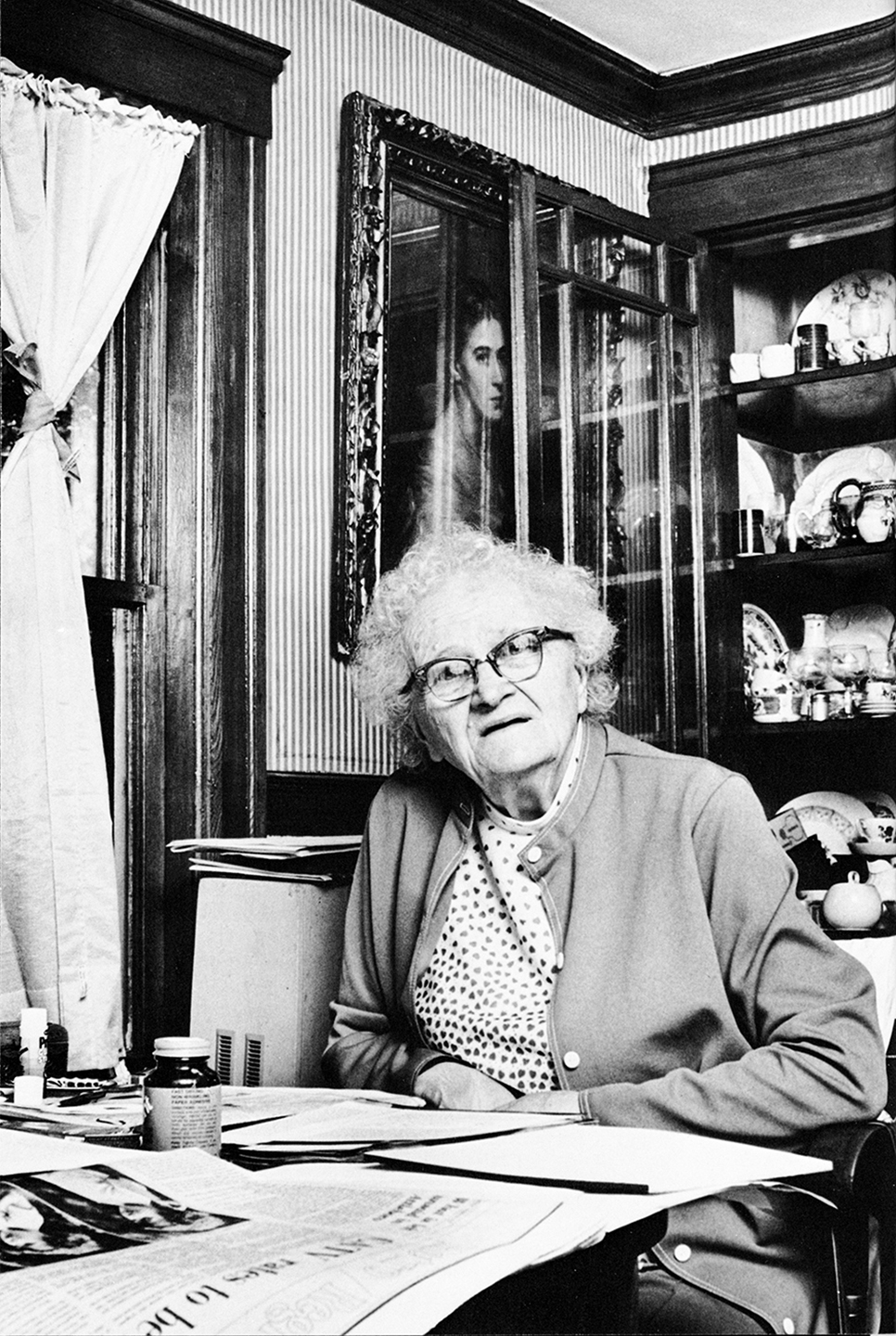
Cecilia Payne-Gaposchkin photographed by Lynn Gilbert

== Honors and awards ==
- Elected member of Royal Astronomical Society while still a student at Cambridge (1923)
- Listed among 250 scientists added to the fourth edition of American Men of Science (1927)
- First recipient of the Annie J. Cannon Award in Astronomy (1934)
- Member of the American Philosophical Society (1936)
- Member of the American Academy of Arts and Sciences (1943)
- Received the Award of Merit from Radcliffe College (1952)
- Awarded the Rittenhouse Medal from the Rittenhouse Astronomical Society at the Franklin Institute (1961)
- Named Professor Emerita of Harvard University (1967)
- Namesake of Asteroid 2039 Payne-Gaposchkin, discovered in 1974
- Henry Norris Russell Lectureship of the American Astronomical Society (1976)
- Institute of Physics Cecilia Payne-Gaposchkin Medal and Prize named in her honor (2008)
- The American Physical Society's Doctoral Dissertation Award in Astrophysics was renamed the Cecilia Payne-Gaposchkin Doctoral Dissertation Award in Astrophysics (2018)
- Namesake of one of the ASAS-SN telescopes deployed in South Africa
- Honorary Degrees from Rutgers University, Wilson College, Smith College, Western College, Colby College, and the Women's Medical College of Pennsylvania
- Namesake of the Payne-Gaposchkin Patera (volcano) on Venus
- In 2026, English Heritage installed a blue plaque in her honour on 70 Lansdowne Road, London, where she lived in her teens.

== Selected bibliography ==
Published academic books:

- The Stars of High Luminosity. Harvard Observatory monographs; no. 3. New York; London: published for the Harvard Observatory by McGraw Hill. 1930. LCCN 30-34245. OCLC 3196276.
- Payne-Gaposchkin, Cecilia; Gaposchkin, Sergei (1938). Variable Stars. Harvard Observatory monographs; no. 5. Cambridge, Massachusetts: Harvard Observatory. LCCN 39-18855. OCLC 831947.
- Variable Stars & Galactic Structure. London: University of London; Athlone Press. 1954. LCCN 55-37995. OCLC 530546.
- Introduction to Astronomy. Prentice-Hall physics series. New York: Prentice-Hall. 1954. Bibcode:1954inas.book.....G. LCCN 54-10155. OCLC 416552.
- The Galactic Novae. Series in astrophysics. Amsterdam; New York: North-Holland; Interscience Publishers. 1957. LCCN 57-3656. OCLC 838013.

Significant research papers:

- —— (1936), "On the Physical Condition of the Supernovae", Proceedings of the National Academy of Sciences, 22 (6): 332–6, Bibcode:1936PNAS...22..332P, doi:10.1073/pnas.22.6.332, JSTOR 86556, PMC 1076773, PMID 16588077
- Whipple, F. L.; —— (1936), "On the Bright Line Spectrum of Nova Herculis", Proceedings of the National Academy of Sciences, 22 (4): 195–200, Bibcode:1936PNAS...22..195W, doi:10.1073/pnas.22.4.195, JSTOR 86718, PMC 1076741, PMID 16577695
- —— (1941), "Obituary – Annie Jump Cannon", Science, 93 (2419): 443–444, Bibcode:1941Sci....93..443P, doi:10.1126/science.93.2419.443, PMID 17820707, S2CID 42913492
- Payne-Gaposchkin, Cecilia (September 1, 1963). "Novae and Novalike Stars". Annual Review of Astronomy and Astrophysics. 1 (1): 145–148. Bibcode:1963ARA&A...1..145P. doi:10.1146/annurev.aa.01.090163.001045. ISSN 0066-4146.
- Payne-Gaposchkin, Cecilia (September 1, 1978). "The Development of our Knowledge of Variable Stars". Annual Review of Astronomy and Astrophysics. 16 (1): 1–13. Bibcode:1978ARA&A..16....1P. doi:10.1146/annurev.aa.16.090178.000245. ISSN 0066-4146.

== See also ==
- Harvard Computers – Team of women who processed astronomical data
- Sisters of the Sun
- Timeline of women in science
