= Southco =

- Southco logo
- Company type: Public limited company
- Industry: Designer and manufacturer
- Founded: 1899 in United States
- Headquarters: United States
- Area served: Americas, Europe, Asia Pacific
- Parent: Touchpoint Inc.
- Website: southco.com

Southco is a US based global designer and manufacturer company.

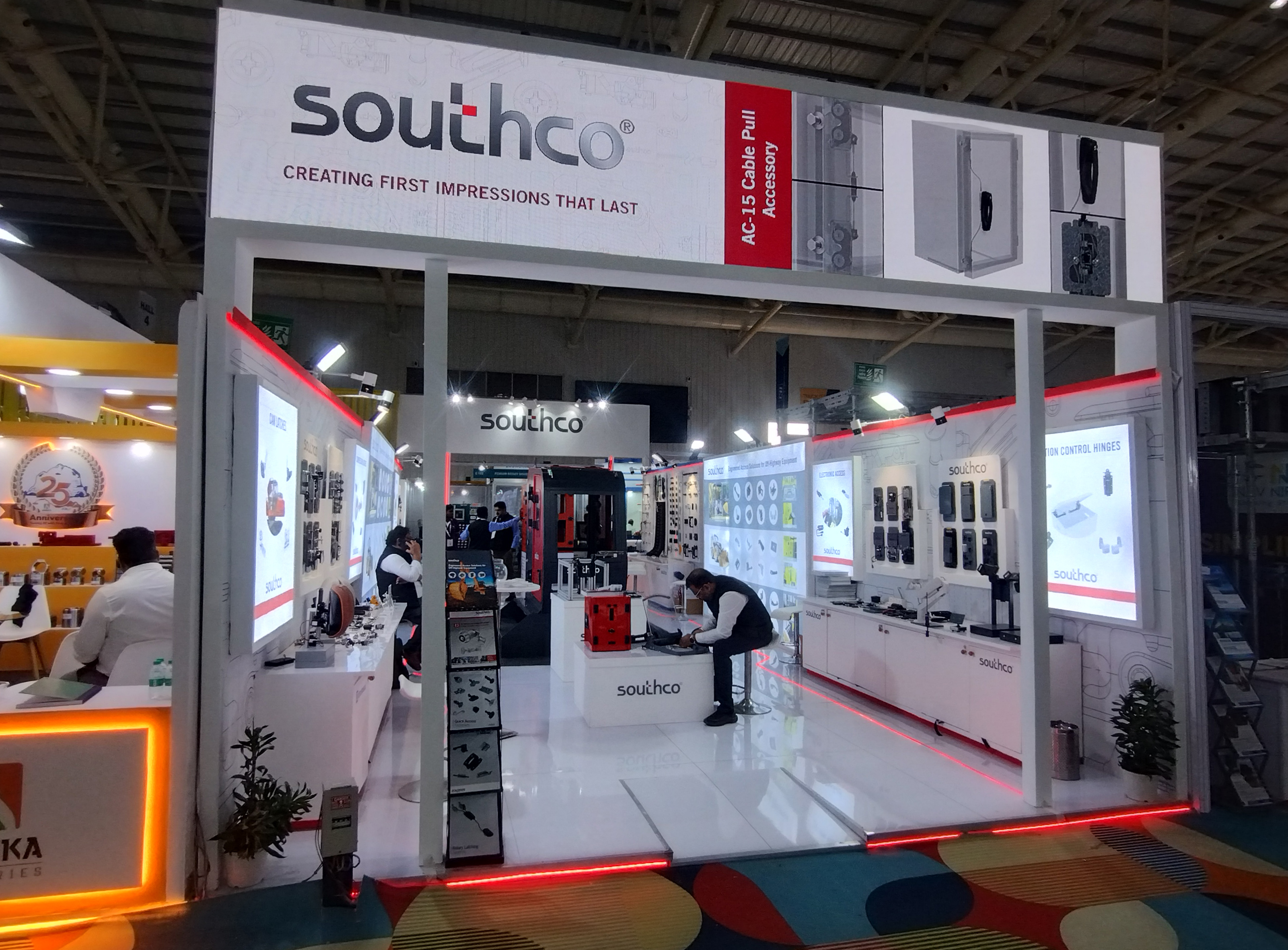
Southco at EXCON 2025, BIEC

== History ==
Southco was founded in 1899 as a pipe manufacturer for the Pennsylvania oil industry. Presently Southco is the subsidiary of Touchpoint Inc.
