= Wynnefield Heights, Philadelphia =

Wynnefield Heights
- Neighborhood of Philadelphia
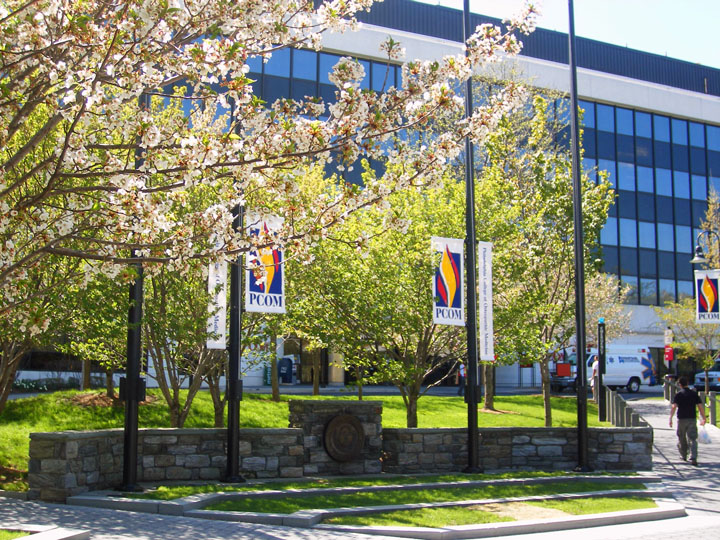
- Wynnefield Heights is the home of The Philadelphia College of Osteopathic Medicine, or PCOM, a school of some 1,300 medical and graduate-level students, which also serves as the Philadelphia 76ers practice facilities.

- Location within Philadelphia
- Country: United States
- State: Pennsylvania
- County: Philadelphia
- City: Philadelphia
- Area codes: 215, 267, and 445

Wynnefield Heights is a middle class neighborhood that is located in the greater West Philadelphia area of Philadelphia, Pennsylvania, United States. The neighborhood is bounded by City Avenue to the north, Belmont Avenue to the west, Fairmount Park to the south and east, and the Schuylkill Expressway to the east.

== History and notable features ==
This area is also known as Woodside Park or Balwynne Park. "Woodside Park" is the name of a former amusement park that was built in 1897 by the Fairmount Park Transportation Company and continued in operation until 1955.

There are a number of apartment complexes and hotels in the neighborhood, as the Schuylkill Expressway (Route 76) and Belmont Avenue provide quick access to Center City, Philadelphia and the nearby suburbs located in Montgomery County. Major business and government facilities in the neighborhood are ABC Channel 6's studios, Target, the Philadelphia Water Department. Belmont Water Treatment Facility and Reservoir, the Pennsylvania State Police Troop K Barracks, and Philadelphia College of Osteopathic Medicine's (PCOM) main campus.

== Demographics ==
Per 2010 U.S. Census data, the community is racially diverse with 36.7% African-American, 48.3% Caucasian, 9.5% Asian/Pacific Islander, and 2.8% Hispanic/Latino. As of 2010, the HUD Estimated Median Family Income for the neighborhood was approximately $76,200.

The neighborhood offers a variety of housing types: two-story brick town homes and row duplexes, garden apartments, and mid-rise and high-rise apartment homes. Of the 5,601 total housing units located in the area per 2010 Census data, 1,045 or 18.7% are owner-occupied units. At this time there are no public or parochial schools within the Wynnefield Heights neighborhood.

The Wynnefield Heights Civic Association ("WHCA") aims to "promote civic action and interaction between the residents and businesses of Wynnefield Heights for the purposes of creating a safe, clean and responsible community." WHCA holds an annual Community Day in July at the new Woodside Park & Playground located in the neighborhood.
