= Charles Blakeway =

The Ven. Charles Edward Blakeway (1868–1922) was Archdeacon of Stafford from 1911 until his death.

Blakeway was educated at Shrewsbury School and Christ Church, Oxford; and ordained in 1897.

He was an Assistant Master at Malvern College from 1898 until 1900; and Curate of Great Malvern from 1900 until 1902. After this, he held the living at Dunston from 1902 until 1914; and was Chaplain to the Bishop of Lichfield from 1913 until his death.
