= James John Garth Wilkinson =

British homeopathic physician and writer (1812–1899)

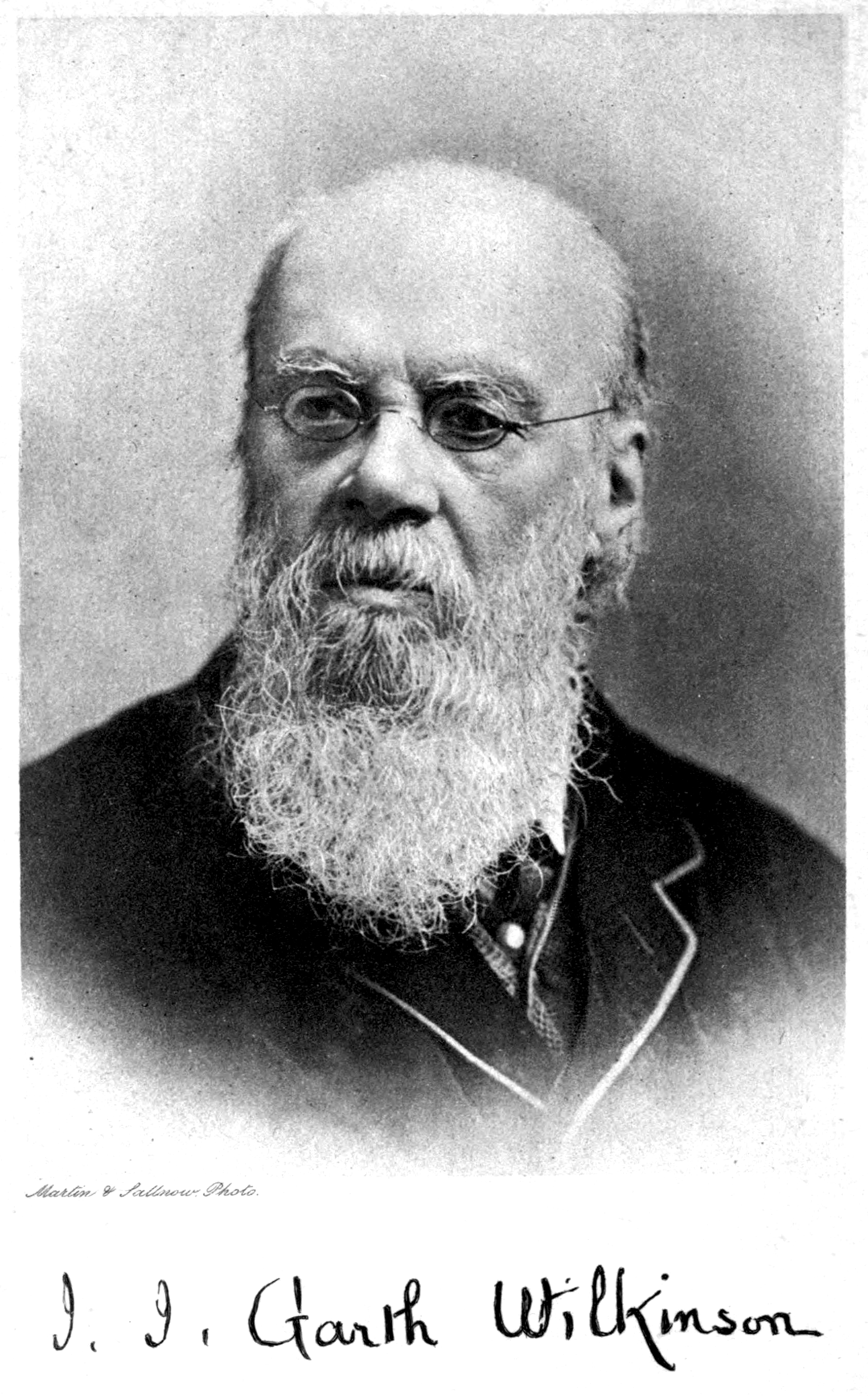
- Born: 3 June 1812; London, England
- Died: 18 October 1899 (aged 87); Hampstead, London, England
- Occupation(s): Homeopath, writer

James John Garth Wilkinson (3 June 1812 – 18 October 1899), was an English homeopathic physician, social reformer, translator and editor of Swedenborg's works, and a writer on Swedenborgian topics.

== Life ==
The son of James John Wilkinson (died 1845), a writer on mercantile law and judge of the County Palatine of Durham, he was born in London. Wilkinson studied medicine and worked at Newcastle Infirmary and Guy's Hospital. He was a Member of the Royal College of Surgeons and a Licentiate of the Society of Apothecaries in 1834. He became an independent medical practitioner at Store Street, Bedford Square in 1835. However, he became disillusioned with orthodox medicine and later took up homeopathy.

Attracted by the works of William Blake, he studied the Songs of Experience. He was also inspired by Emanuel Swedenborg, to the elucidation of whose writings he devoted much of his life.

He died at Finchley Road, South Hampstead, where he had lived for nearly fifty years. He was commemorated by a bust and portrait in the rooms of the Swedenborgian Society in Bloomsbury Street, London.

== Works ==
Between 1840 and 1850 he edited Swedenborg's treatises on The Doctrine of Charity, The Animal Kingdom, Outlines of a Philosophic Argument on the Infinite, and Hieroglyphic Key to Natural and Spiritual Mysteries.

Wilkinson's preliminary discourses to these translations and his criticisms of Samuel Taylor Coleridge's comments on Swedenborg displayed an aptitude not only for mystical research, but also for original philosophic debate. The vigour of his thought won admiration from Henry James, Sr. (father of the novelist) and from Ralph Waldo Emerson, through whom he met Thomas Carlyle and James Anthony Froude; and his speculation further attracted Alfred Tennyson, the Oliphants and Edward Maitland.

He wrote a sketch of Swedenborg for the Penny Cyclopaedia, and a standard biography, Emanuel Swedenborg (1849); but these were not his only interests. He was a traveller, a linguist, well versed in Scandinavian literature and philology, the author of mystical poems entitled Improvisations from the Spirit (1857), a social and medical reformer, a convinced opponent of vaccination and vivisection. Wilkinson was a vegetarian.

Wilkinson criticized vivisection as unethical and unnecessary cruelty inflicted on animals in his book On Human Science: Good and Evil, and on Divine Revelation, published in 1876. He was an advocate of nature conservation and women's rights.

== Anti-vaccination ==
Wilkinson was an anti-vaccinationist. He contributed to The Vaccination Inquirer and completed a series of Vaccination Tracts in 1879.

== Legacy ==
Henry James, Sr. became a Swedenborgian, and named a son after Wilkinson: Garth Wilkinson James, also known as Wilkie James, an officer of the 54th Regiment Massachusetts Volunteer Infantry under Robert Gould Shaw.

== Selected publications ==
- Emanuel Swedenborg: A Biography (1849)
- The Human Body and its Connexion With Man (1851)
- The Homoeopathic Principle Applied to Insanity (1857)
- On Human Science: Good and Evil, and on Divine Revelation (1876)
- Vaccination Tracts (1879)
- Epidemic Man and His Visitations (1893)
- The New Jerusalem and the Old Jerusalem (1894)

== Sources ==
- Lines, Richard. "James John Garth Wilkinson 1812–1899: Author, Physician, Swedenborgian". Journal of the New Church Historical Society. Chester, 2002. (Available on-line.)
- Wilkinson, Clement John. James John Garth Wilkinson. London, 1911. (Available on-line.)
