= Deeper, Deeper, Deeper Still =

- Cosmos: A Spacetime Odyssey episode
- Episode no.: Season 1 Episode 6
- Directed by: Bill Pope
- Written by: Ann Druyan; Steven Soter
- Narrated by: Neil deGrasse Tyson
- Editing by: John Duffy; Michael O'Halloran; Eric Lea
- Production code: 106
- Original air date: April 13, 2014
- Running time: 44 minutes

Episode chronology
← Previous "Hiding in the Light"	Next → "The Clean Room"

"Deeper, Deeper, Deeper Still" is the sixth episode of the American documentary television series Cosmos: A Spacetime Odyssey. It premiered on April 13, 2014 on Fox and aired on April 14, 2014 on National Geographic Channel. The episode explores the smallest particles in the universe, where host Neil deGrasse Tyson "hunts for elusive neutrinos and the distant, early universe." The episode features the underground neutrino laboratory, Super-Kamiokande, located underneath Mount Kamioka in Japan.

The episode received a 1.3/4 in the 18-49 rating/share, with 3.49 million American viewers watching on Fox.

== Episode summary ==
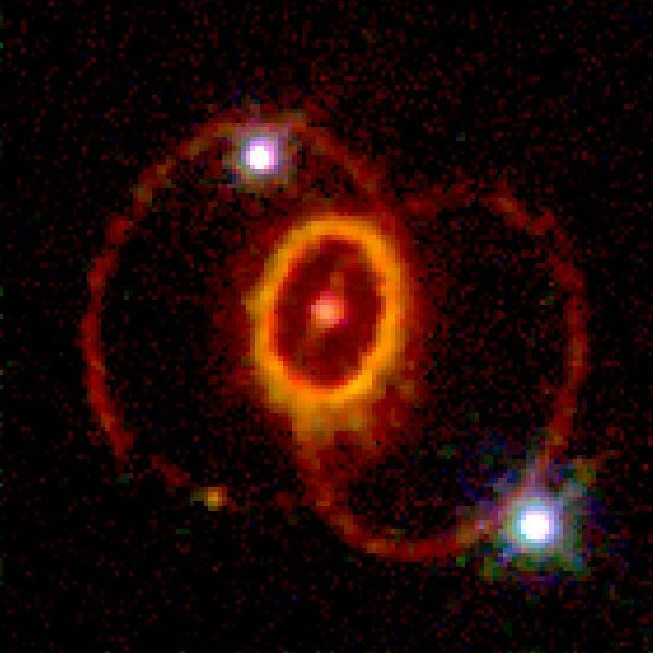
Supernova SN 1987A helped to prove the existence of neutrinos that resulted from the nuclear reactions deep within any star.

This episode exhibits the nature of the cosmos on the microscopic and atomic scales, using the Ship of the Imagination to explore these realms. Tyson describes some of the micro-organisms that live within a dewdrop, demonstrating parameciums and tardigrades. He proceeds to discuss how plants use photosynthesis via their chloroplasts to convert sunlight into chemical reactions which convert carbon dioxide and water into oxygen and energy-rich sugars. Tyson then discusses the nature of molecules and atoms and how they relate to the evolution of species. He uses the example set forth by Charles Darwin postulating the existence of the long-tongued Morgan's sphinx moth based on the nature of the comet orchid with pollen far within the flower. He further demonstrates that scents from flowers are used to trigger olfactory centers in the brain, stimulating the mind to threats as to aid in the survival of the species.

Tyson narrates how Greek philosophers Thales and Democritus postulated that all matter was made up of combinations of atoms in a large number of configurations, and describes how carbon serves as the basic building block for life on Earth due to its unique chemical nature. Tyson examines the basic structure of atoms, their protons, neutrons, and electrons, and the nature of nuclear fusion, a process found to occur within most stars. He then discusses the existence of neutrinos created by these nuclear processes, and the attempts to detect such subatomic particles which normally pass through matter, requiring subterranean facilities like the Super-Kamiokande which were used to detect neutrinos from the supernova SN 1987A in the Large Magellanic Cloud. These neutrinos were detected before any light from the explosion reached us; this was due to their ability to pass through the matter of the dying star itself. Tyson compares how neutrinos were postulated by Wolfgang Pauli to account for the conservation of energy from nuclear reactions in the same manner as Darwin's postulate on the long-tongued moth. Tyson concludes by noting that neutrinos from the Big Bang still exist in the universe but, due to the nature of light, there is a "wall of infinity" beyond which we cannot observe.

== Reception ==
=== Ratings ===
The episode's premiere on Fox brought a 1.3/4 in the 18-49 rating/share, with an audience of 3.49 million American viewers. It placed fourth and last in its timeslot behind The Good Wife, Resurrection and Believe; and fourteenth out of seventeen for the night.
