= Some of the Things That Molecules Do =

- Cosmos: A Spacetime Odyssey episode
- Episode no.: Episode 2
- Directed by: Bill Pope
- Written by: Ann Druyan; Steven Soter
- Narrated by: Neil deGrasse Tyson
- Editing by: Michael O'Halloran; John Duffy; Eric Lea
- Production code: 102
- Original air date: March 16, 2014
- Running time: 44 minutes

Episode chronology
← Previous "Standing Up in the Milky Way"	Next → "When Knowledge Conquered Fear"

"Some of the Things That Molecules Do" is the second episode of the American documentary television series Cosmos: A Spacetime Odyssey. It premiered on March 16, 2014 on Fox.

The episode received positive reviews, with critics praising the beautiful graphics as well as the wonder-inspiring and straightforward narrative of how evolution works. Despite positive reviews, however, the episode received a 2.0/5 in the 18-49 rating/share, with 4.95 million American viewers watching it live—a decrease from the 5.77 million viewers who watched the series premiere.

== Episode summary ==
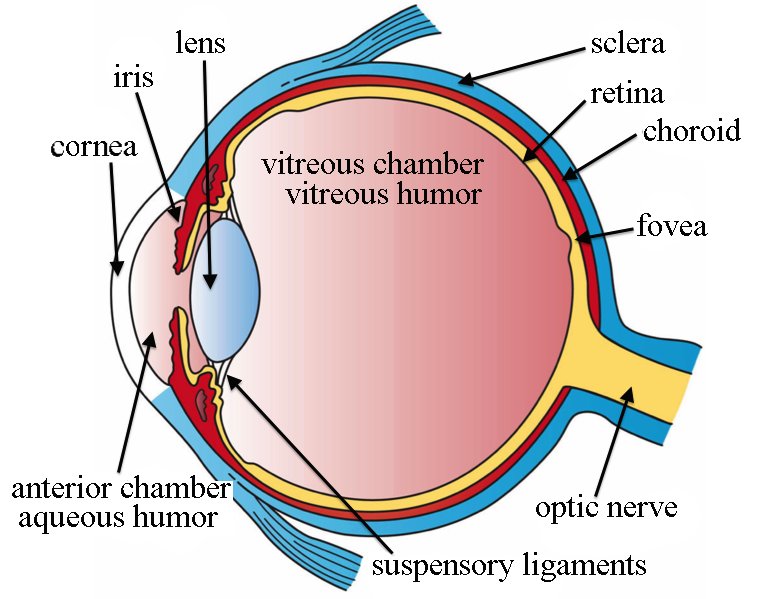
The human eye was used as a device to explain evolution to the audience.

The episode covers several facets of the origin of life and evolution. Tyson describes both artificial selection via selective breeding, using the example of mankind's domestication of wolves into dogs, and natural selection that created species like polar bears. Tyson uses the Ship of the Imagination to show how DNA, genes, and mutation work, and how these led to the diversity of species as represented by the Tree of Life, including how complex organs such as the eye came about as a common element. Tyson describes extinction of species and the five great extinction events that wiped out numerous species on Earth, while some species, such as the tardigrade, were able to survive and continue life. Tyson speculates on the possibility of life on other planets, such as Saturn's moon, Titan, as well as how abiogenesis may have originated life on Earth. The episode concludes with an animation from the original Cosmos showing the evolution of life from a single cell to mankind today, with music from Vivaldi's Mandolin Concerto.

== Reception ==
Upon airing on Fox, the episode received a 2.0/5 in the 18-49 rating/share, with 4.95 million American viewers watching it live. It placed fourth and last in its timeslot behind Resurrection, The Good Wife, and Believe; and twelfth out of sixteen for the night.
