= The Clean Room =

- Cosmos: A Spacetime Odyssey episode
- Episode no.: Episode 7
- Directed by: Brannon Braga
- Written by: Ann Druyan; Steven Soter
- Narrated by: Neil deGrasse Tyson
- Editing by: John Duffy; Michael O'Halloran; Eric Lea
- Production code: 107
- Original air date: April 20, 2014
- Running time: 42 minutes

Guest appearance
- Richard Gere as Clair Patterson

Episode chronology
| ← Previous "Deeper, Deeper, Deeper Still" | Next → "Sisters of the Sun" |

"The Clean Room" is the seventh episode of the American documentary television series Cosmos: A Spacetime Odyssey. It premiered on April 20, 2014, on Fox and aired on April 21, 2014, on National Geographic Channel. The episode explores the methods and processes used to measure the age of the Earth. The episode also pays tribute to geochemist Clair Patterson (voiced by Richard Gere) in his quest to remove the neurotoxin lead, from gasoline. The episode's title alludes to Patterson's attempts in sterilizing his lab after realizing that the inconsistent results in his experiments were due to lead contamination.

The episode received a 1.4/4 in the 18-49 rating/share, with 3.74 million American viewers watching on Fox.

== Episode summary ==
The episode describes how science, in particular the work of Clair Patterson (voiced in animated sequences by Richard Gere) in the middle of the 20th century, has been able to determine the age of the Earth. Tyson first describes how the Earth was formed from the coalescence of matter some millions of years after the formation of the Sun, and while scientists can examine the formations in rock stratum to date some geological events, these can only trace back millions of years. Instead, scientists have used the debris from meteor impacts, such as the Meteor Crater in Arizona, knowing that the material from such meteors coming from the asteroid belt would have been made at the same time as the Earth.

Tyson then outlines the work Patterson did as a graduate under his adviser Harrison Brown to provide an accurate count of lead in zircon particles from Meteor Crater, and to work with similar results being collected by George Tilton on uranium counts; with the established half-life of uranium's radioactive decay to lead, this would be used to estimate the age of the Earth. Patterson found that his results were contaminated by lead from the ambient environment, compared to Tilton's results, and required the construction of the first ultra-high cleanroom to remove all traces of environmental lead. With these clean results, Patterson was able to estimate the age of the Earth to 4.5 billion years.

Tyson goes on to explain that Patterson's work in performing lead-free experiments directed him to investigate the sources for lead. Tyson notes how lead does not naturally occur at Earth's surface but has been readily mined by humans (including the Roman Empire), and that lead is poisonous to humans. Patterson examined the levels of lead in the common environment and in deeper parts of the oceans and Antarctic ice, showing that lead had only been brought to the surface in recent times. He would discover that the higher levels of lead were from the use of tetraethyllead in leaded gasoline, despite long-established claims by Robert A. Kehoe and others that this chemical was safe. Patterson would continue to campaign against the use of lead, ultimately resulting in government-mandated restrictions on the use of lead. Tyson ends by noting that similar work by scientists continues to be used to help alert mankind to other fateful issues that can be identified by the study of nature.

== Reception ==
The episode's premiere on Fox brought a 1.4/4 in the 18-49 rating/share, with an audience of 3.74 million American viewers. It placed fourth and last in its timeslot behind The Good Wife, In My Dreams, and Believe; and eighth out of seventeenth for the night.

Jennifer Ouellette of the Los Angeles Times called it "the strongest, most coherent, and riveting episode yet."
