= When Knowledge Conquered Fear =

- Cosmos: A Spacetime Odyssey episode
- Episode no.: Episode 3
- Directed by: Brannon Braga
- Written by: Ann Druyan; Steven Soter
- Narrated by: Neil deGrasse Tyson
- Editing by: Eric Lea; Michael O'Halloran; John Duffy
- Production code: 103
- Original air date: March 23, 2014
- Running time: 43 minutes

Guest appearances
- Cary Elwes as Edmond Halley / Robert Hooke; Tom Konkle as Samuel Pepys; Alexander Siddig as Isaac Newton

Episode chronology
← Previous "Some of the Things That Molecules Do"	Next → "A Sky Full of Ghosts"

"When Knowledge Conquered Fear" is the third episode of the American documentary television series Cosmos: A Spacetime Odyssey. It premiered on March 23, 2014, on Fox, and premiered on March 24, 2014, on National Geographic Channel.

The episode received positive reviews, with critics remarking on the homage the series paid to theories that evolved due to contributions from Isaac Newton, Nicolaus Copernicus, Edmond Halley, and Robert Hooke. Despite positive reviews, however, the episode received a 1.7/4 in the 18-49 rating/share, with 4.25 million American viewers watching it live.

== Episode summary ==
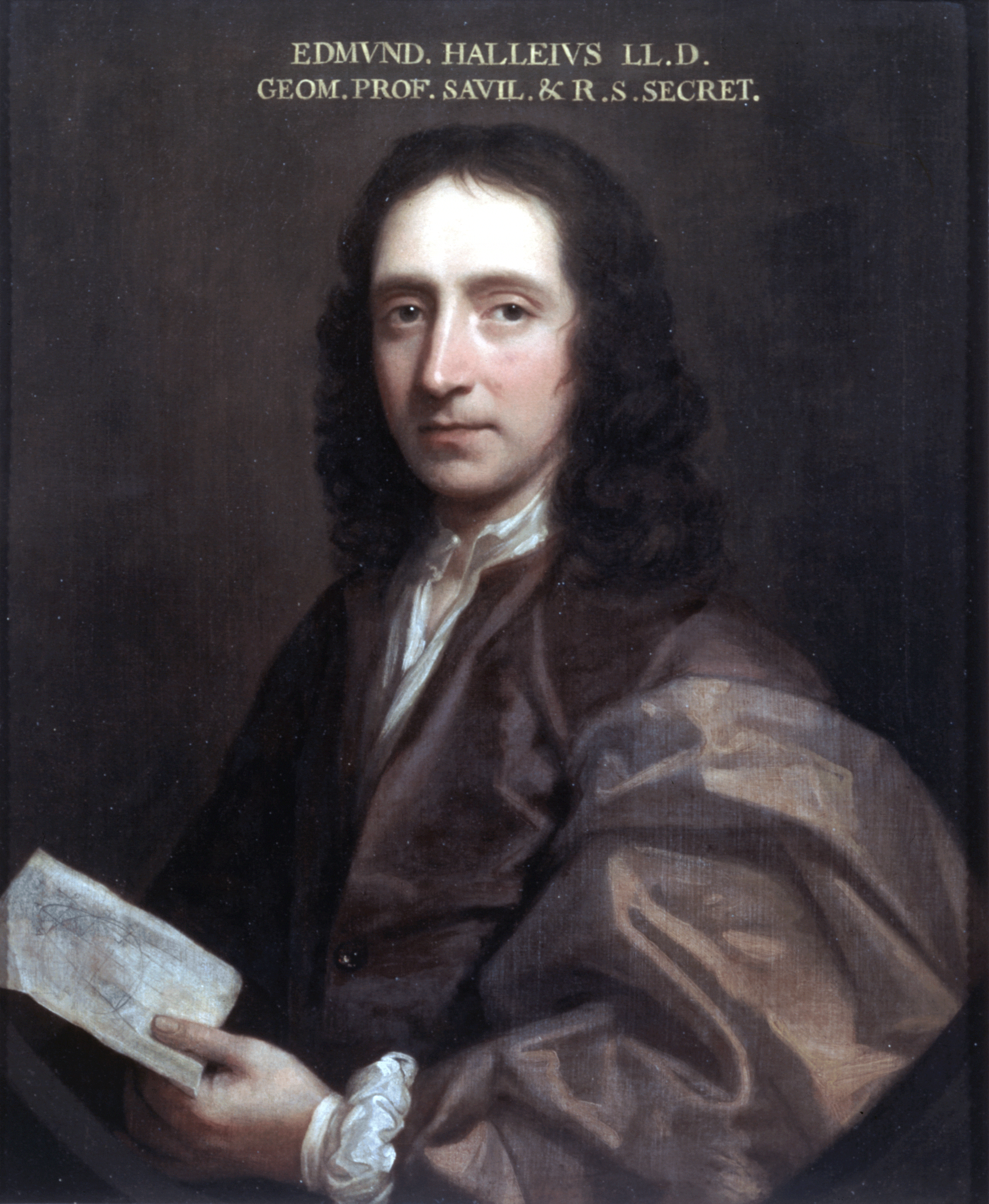
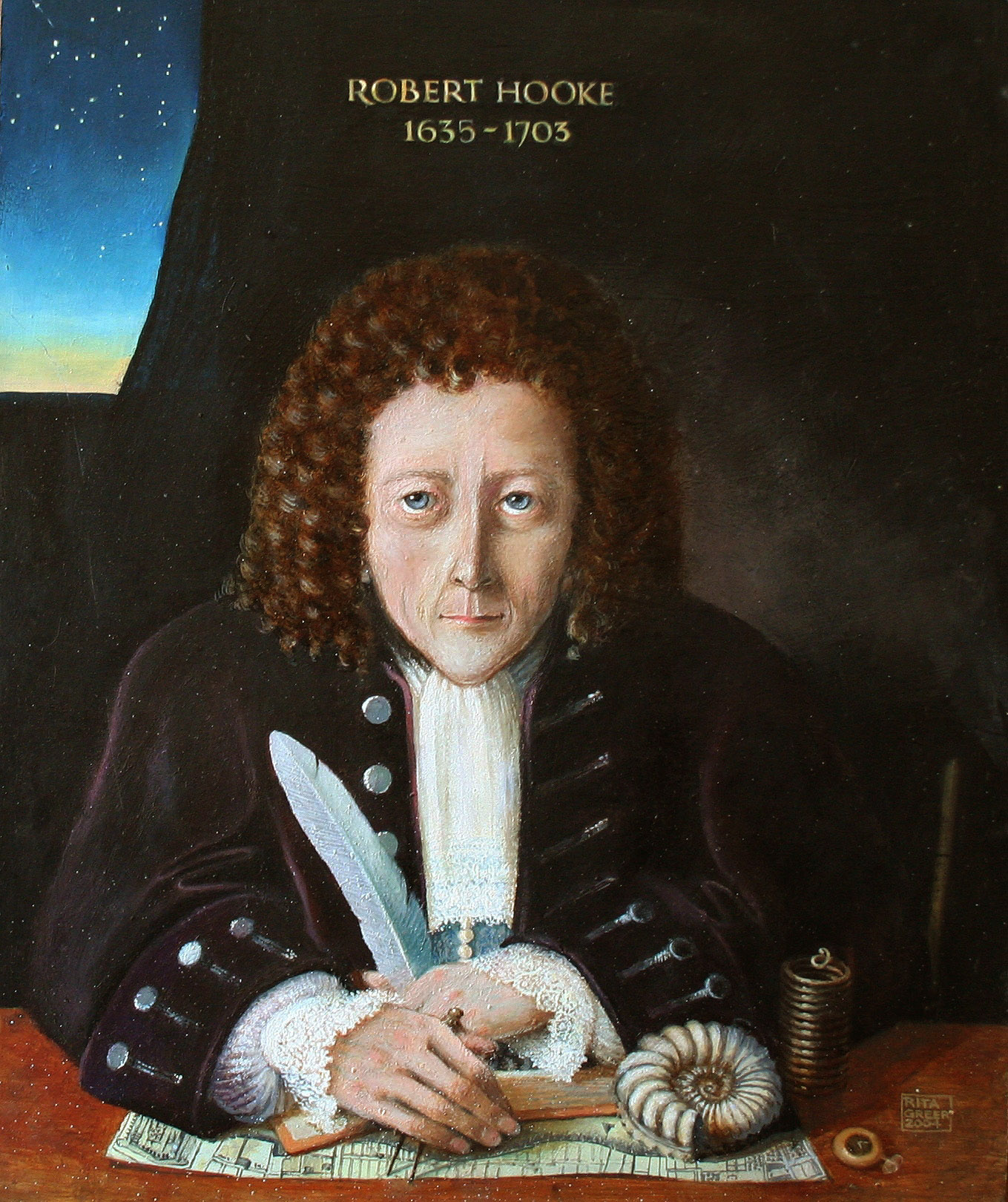
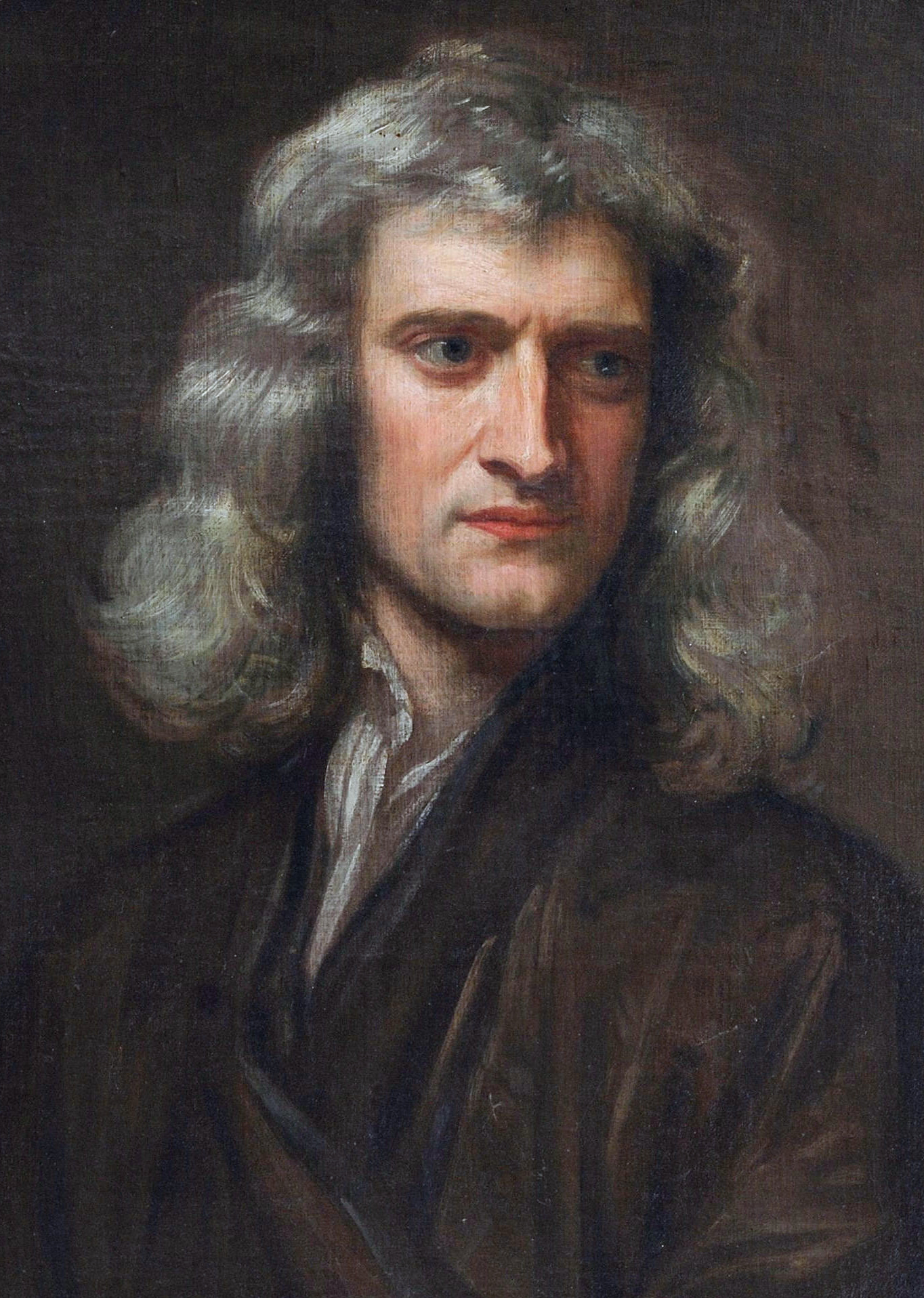
The three historical figures featured in the episode's narrative sequence, from left to right, Edmund Halley (1656 – 1742), Robert Hooke (1635 – 1703) and Isaac Newton (1642 – 1727)

The episode begins with Tyson describing how we were born into this world without an explanation of our surroundings, much like a baby abandoned on a doorstep. To help us learn about our surroundings, Tyson explains how we manifested pattern recognition early in mankind, sharpening over eons of evolution. We distinguished predator from prey; and poisonous plants from nourishing ones - enhancing our chance to live and reproduce, and passing on our genes. We used pattern recognition in astronomy and astrology, where different cultures, recognizing the patterns of stars in the skies, projected different symbols and pictures for constellations. We used it to predict the passing of the seasons, including how every culture determined that the passage of a comet was taken as an omen. Tyson continues to explain that the origin of comets only became known in the 20th century due to the work of Jan Oort and his hypothesis of the Oort cloud.

Tyson then continues to relate the collaboration Edmund Halley and Isaac Newton in the last part of the 17th century in Cambridge. The collaboration would result in the publication of Philosophiæ Naturalis Principia Mathematica, the first major work to describe the laws of physics in mathematical terms, challenging the prevailing notion that God had planned out the heavens, and against objections and claims of plagiarism from Robert Hooke, and financial difficulties of the Royal Society of London. Tyson explains how Newton's work would influence many factors of life, including modern space flight. Tyson further describes Halley's contributions including determining Earth's distance to the Sun, the motion of stars and predicting of the orbit of the then-unnamed Halley's Comet using Newton's laws. Tyson contrasts these scientific approaches to understanding the galaxy compared to what early mankind had done. The episode ends with animation of the Milky Way and Andromeda galaxies merging based on the principles of Newton's laws.

== Reception ==
The episode's premiere on Fox brought a 1.7/4 in the 18-49 rating/share, with 4.25 million American viewers watching it live. It placed fourth and last in its timeslot behind Resurrection, The Amazing Race All-Stars, and Believe; and thirteenth out of eighteenth for the night.
