= A Sky Full of Ghosts =

- Cosmos: A Spacetime Odyssey episode
- Episode no.: Episode 4
- Directed by: Brannon Braga
- Written by: Ann Druyan; Steven Soter
- Narrated by: Neil deGrasse Tyson
- Editing by: John Duffy; Michael O'Halloran; Eric Lea
- Production code: 105
- Original air date: March 30, 2014
- Running time: 43 minutes

Guest appearance
- Patrick Stewart as William Herschel

Episode chronology
← Previous "When Knowledge Conquered Fear"	Next → "Hiding in the Light"

"A Sky Full of Ghosts" is the fourth episode of the American documentary television series Cosmos: A Spacetime Odyssey. It premiered on March 30, 2014 on Fox and on March 31, 2014 on National Geographic Channel. The episode presented an in-depth treatment of black holes, beginning with John Michell's suggestion of the existence of an "invisible star" to the first discovery of a black hole, Cygnus X-1. The episode's title is an allusion to how light from stars and other cosmic objects takes eons to travel to Earth, giving rise to the possibility that we might be viewing objects that no longer exist.

The episode received positive reviews, with one critic remarking on how the "high level of production value is consistently entertaining and informative." Despite favorable reviews, however, the episode received a 1.5/4 in the 18-49 rating/share demo, with 3.91 million Americans watching it live on Fox, showing a steady decline from the series premiere.

== Episode summary ==
Tyson begins the episode by explaining the nature of the speed of light and how much of what is seen of the observable universe is from light emanated from billions of years ago. Tyson further explains how modern astronomy has used such analysis via deep time to identify the Big Bang event and the age of the universe.

Tyson proceeds to describe how the work of Isaac Newton, William Herschel, Michael Faraday, and James Clerk Maxwell contributed to understanding the nature of electromagnetic waves and gravitational force, and how this work led towards Albert Einstein's Theory of Relativity, that the speed of light is a fundamental constant of the universe and gravity can be seen as distortion of the fabric of space-time. Tyson describes the concept of dark stars as postulated by John Michell which are not visible but detectable by tracking other stars trapped within their gravity wells, an idea Herschel used to discover binary stars.

Tyson then describes the nature of black holes, their enormous gravitational forces that can even capture light, and their discovery via X-ray sources such as Cygnus X-1. Tyson uses the Ship of Imagination to provide a postulate of the warping of spacetime and time dilation as one enters the event horizon of the black hole, and the possibility that these may lead to other points within our universe or others, or even time travel. Tyson ends on noting that Herschel's son, John would be inspired by his father to continue to document the known stars as well as contributions towards photography that play on the same nature of deep time used by astronomers.

Animated sequences in this episode feature William and John Herschel; Patrick Stewart provided the voice for William in these segments.

== Reception ==
The episode's premiere on Fox brought a 1.5/4 in the 18-49 rating/share, with 3.91 million American viewers watching it live. It placed third and last in its timeslot behind Resurrection and Believe; and thirteenth out of eighteenth for the night.
