= Sisters of the Sun =

- Cosmos: A Spacetime Odyssey episode
- Episode no.: Episode 8
- Directed by: Brannon Braga
- Written by: Ann Druyan; Steven Soter
- Narrated by: Neil deGrasse Tyson
- Editing by: John Duffy; Michael O'Halloran; Eric Lea
- Production code: 108
- Original air date: April 27, 2014
- Running time: 44 minutes

Guest appearances
- Kirsten Dunst as Cecilia Payne; Marlee Matlin as Annie Jump Cannon; Maria Frucci; Peggy Jo Jacobs as Margaret Harwood; Enn Reitel

Episode chronology
← Previous "The Clean Room"	Next → "The Lost Worlds of Planet Earth"

"Sisters of the Sun" is the eighth episode of the American documentary television series Cosmos: A Spacetime Odyssey. It premiered on April 27, 2014, on Fox, and aired on April 28, 2014, on National Geographic Channel. The episode explores the violent cosmic phenomenon of supernovas, which on average occur once per galaxy per century or one billion times per year in the observable universe. The episode pays homage to the discoveries of two female astronomers, Cecilia Payne (voiced by Kirsten Dunst) and Annie Jump Cannon (voiced by Marlee Matlin), and the obstacles faced by women scientists, especially those working in the early 20th century. Payne discovered the chemical composition of stars and that they consist largely of hydrogen. Cannon developed the first catalog for the spectral characteristics of stars. The episode's title refers to the scientific contributions of the women scientists featured in the episode as well as how their discoveries helped advance our knowledge of the composition of stars.

The episode received a 1.4/4 in the 18-49 rating/share, with 3.66 million American viewers watching on Fox.

== Episode summary ==
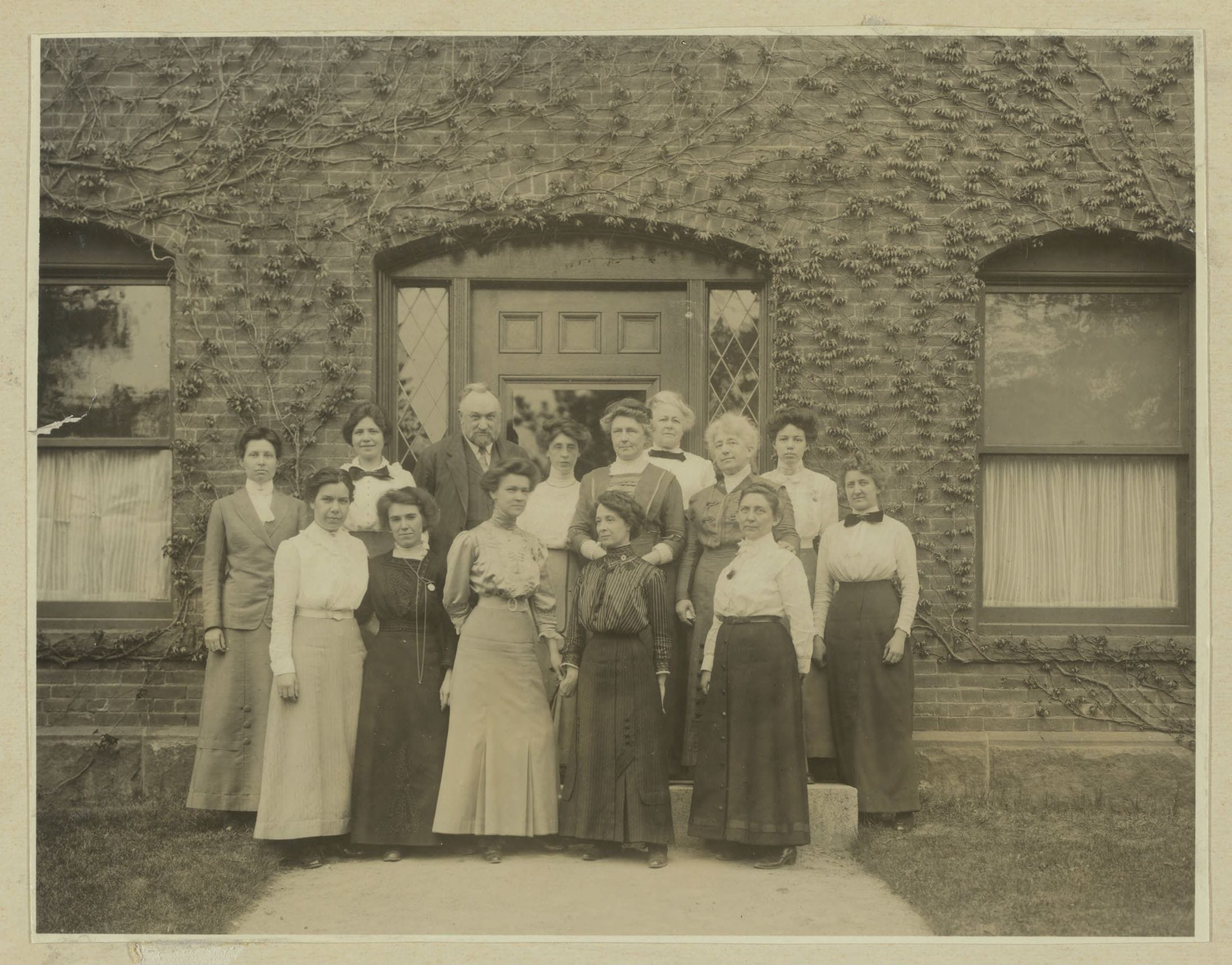
The Harvard Computers that helped to classify the types of stars

This episode provides an overview of the composition of stars, and their fate in billions of years. Tyson describes how early man would identify stars via the use of constellations that tied in with various myths and beliefs, such as the Pleiades. Tyson describes the work of Edward Charles Pickering to capture the spectra of multiple stars simultaneously, and the work of the Harvard Computers or "Pickering's Harem", a team of women researchers under Pickering's mentorship, to catalog the spectra. This team included Annie Jump Cannon, who developed the stellar classification system, and Henrietta Swan Leavitt, who discovered the means to measure the distance from a star to the Earth by its spectra, later used to identify other galaxies in the universe. Later, this team included Cecilia Payne, who would develop a good friendship with Cannon; Payne's thesis based on her work with Cannon was able to determine the composition and temperature of the stars, collaborating with Cannon's classification system.

Tyson then explains the lifecycle of stars from their birth from interstellar clouds. He explains how stars like the Sun keep their size due to the conflicting forces of gravity that pulls the gases in, and the expansion from escaping gases from the fusion reactions at its core. As the Sun ages, it will grow hotter and brighter to the point where the balance between these reactions will fail, causing the Sun to first expand into a red giant, and then collapse into a white dwarf, the collapse limited by the atomic forces. Tyson explains how larger stars may form even more collapsed forms of matter, creating novas and supernovas depending on their size and leading to pulsars. Massive stars can collapse into black holes. Tyson then describes that stars can only be so large, using the example of Eta Carinae which is considered an unstable solar mass that could become a hypernova in the relatively near future. Tyson ends describing how all matter on Earth is the same stuff that stars are made of, and that light and energy from the stars is what drives life on Earth.

== Production ==
Marlee Matlin, Academy Award Winner for Best Actress for her performance in the 1986 film Children of a Lesser God, and the only deaf performer to win a Best Actress Oscar, has collaborated with Cosmos executive producer Seth MacFarlane before in Family Guy where she voiced the character of Stella, Peter Griffin's deaf co-worker at Pawtucket Brewery. Here, Matlin provides the voice of Annie Jump Cannon, a deaf astronomer at Harvard who, along with Edward C. Pickering, is credited with the creation of the Harvard Classification Scheme, which was the first serious attempt to organize and classify stars based on their temperatures.

== Reception ==
The episode's premiere on Fox brought a 1.4/4 in the 18-49 rating/share, with an audience of 3.66 million American viewers. It placed fourth and last in its timeslot behind The Good Wife, Resurrection, and Believe; and thirteenth out of seventeenth for the night.
