= Alan Silvestri =

American composer and conductor (born 1950)

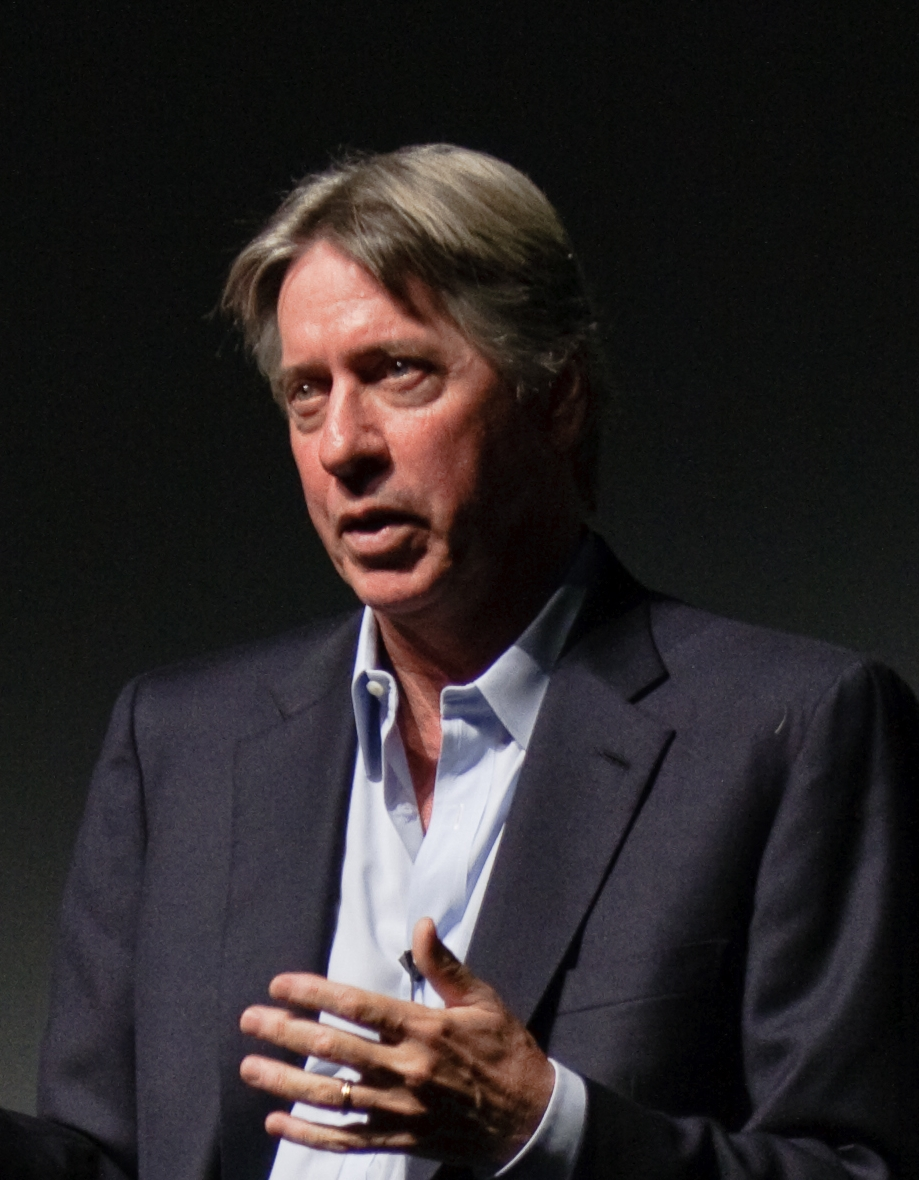
- Silvestri in 2009
- Born: Alan Anthony Silvestri; March 26, 1950 (age 76); New York City, New York, U.S.
- Occupations: Composer; conductor; orchestrator; music producer
- Years active: 1972–present
- Spouse: Sandra Silvestri (m. 1978)
- Children: 3
- Website: www.alansilvestri.com

Alan Anthony Silvestri (born March 26, 1950) is an American composer, conductor, orchestrator and music producer of film scores. He has received two Grammy Awards and two Primetime Emmy Awards as well as nominations for two Academy Awards and two Golden Globe Awards.

He has been associated with director Robert Zemeckis, composing the music for all of his feature films since 1984, some of which have become major box-office hits such as the Back to the Future film series (1985–1990), Who Framed Roger Rabbit (1988), Forrest Gump (1994) and Cast Away (2000).

Silvestri also scored many other popular movies, including Predator (1987), The Abyss (1989), Father of the Bride (1991), The Bodyguard (1992), Eraser (1996), The Parent Trap (1998), Practical Magic (1998), Stuart Little (1999), The Mummy Returns (2001), Lilo & Stitch (2002), Van Helsing (2004), the first three Night at the Museum films, G.I. Joe: The Rise of Cobra (2009), The A-Team (2010), Ready Player One (2018), and five Marvel Cinematic Universe films: Captain America: The First Avenger (2011), The Avengers (2012), Avengers: Infinity War (2018), Avengers: Endgame (2019) and Avengers: Doomsday (2026).

== Early life and education ==
Silvestri was born March 26, 1950. His grandparents emigrated in 1909 from the Italian town of Castell'Alfero, Piedmont, and settled in Teaneck, New Jersey. He grew up in Teaneck, and graduated in 1968 from Teaneck High School. He attended Berklee College of Music for two years. He was a drummer for a short time in 1966 with Teaneck-based rock band the Wildcats.

== Career ==
Silvestri moved to Los Angeles in 1970.

"I came to Hollywood in 1970 broke.... I didn't even have any goals or plans. I didn't even go to movies. And I knew nothing about composers or composing," he said.

In 1972, while he was working intermittently as a session guitarist, the producer of the low-budget action film The Doberman Gang asked him to score the picture. Silvestri agreed, despite a lack of experience: "I went out and bought a how-to-compose book by Earl Hagen.... At one point, I was using beer cans for percussion."

From 1978 to 1983, Silvestri was the main composer for the television series CHiPs, writing music for 95 of the show's 139 episodes.

Silvestri met film director Robert Zemeckis when they worked together on Zemeckis's film Romancing the Stone (1984). Since then, he has composed the music for all of Zemeckis's subsequent movies : the three Back to the Future films (1985, 1989, 1990), Who Framed Roger Rabbit (1988), Death Becomes Her (1992), Forrest Gump (1994), Contact (1997), What Lies Beneath (2000), Cast Away (2000), The Polar Express (2004), Beowulf (2007), A Christmas Carol (2009), Flight (2012), The Walk (2015), Allied (2016), Welcome to Marwen (2018), The Witches (2020), Pinocchio (2022) and Here (2024).

In 1989, Silvestri composed the score for the James Cameron-directed film The Abyss. Since 2001, he has also collaborated regularly with director Stephen Sommers, scoring the films The Mummy Returns (2001), Van Helsing (2004), and G.I. Joe: The Rise of Cobra (2009). He also composed the ImageMovers opening theme.

Silvestri has composed the scores for four Marvel Cinematic Universe films: Captain America: The First Avenger (2011), The Avengers (2012), Avengers: Infinity War (2018), and Avengers: Endgame (2019) and is currently scheduled to compose the scores for Avengers: Doomsday and Avengers: Secret Wars. His themes and motifs from those films have been referenced and reprised by other composers in multiple other MCU films.

Silvestri has also composed music for television series, including T. J. Hooker (one episode), Starsky & Hutch (three episodes), and Tales from the Crypt (seven episodes). In 2014, he composed the award-winning music for the science documentary series Cosmos: A Spacetime Odyssey. He wrote new songs with Glen Ballard for the live-action/CGI film adaptation of Disney's Pinocchio.

== Personal life ==
Silvestri and his wife Sandra own a vineyard, Silvestri Vineyards, in Carmel Valley, California. He also has a wine tasting room for his vineyards on the ground floor of the Enchanted Oaks Building. He has a daughter and two sons. He is a licensed pilot, and he flies his own aircraft - a King Air 65-C90A.

== Filmography ==
=== Film - 1970s and 1980s ===
Year	Title	Director	Studio	Notes
1972	The Doberman Gang	Byron Chudnow	Dimension Pictures	With Bradford Craig
1975	Las Vegas Lady	Noel Nosseck	Crown International Pictures	—N/a
1976	The Amazing Dobermans	Byron Ross Chudnow	Golden Films	—N/a
1978	The Fifth Floor	Howard Avedis	Film Ventures International	
1983	Tiger Man	Matt Cimber	—N/a	Credited as Alan Sylvestri
1984	Romancing the Stone	Robert Zemeckis	20th Century Fox	First collaboration with Robert Zemeckis
1984	Par où t'es rentré ? On t'a pas vu sortir	Philippe Clair	Gaumont	—N/a
1985	Fandango	Kevin Reynolds	Amblin Entertainment; Warner Bros.	—N/a
1985	Cat's Eye	Lewis Teague	De Laurentiis Entertainment Group; Metro-Goldwyn-Mayer	—N/a
1985	Back to the Future	Robert Zemeckis	Amblin Entertainment; Universal Pictures	Nominated — Saturn Award for Best Music; Nominated — Grammy Award for Best Score Soundtrack for Visual Media
1985	Summer Rental	Carl Reiner	Paramount Pictures	—N/a
1986	The Clan of the Cave Bear	Michael Chapman	Producers Sales Organization; Warner Bros.	—N/a
1986	The Delta Force	Menahem Golan	Golan-Globus; The Cannon Group	—N/a
1986	American Anthem	Albert Magnoli	Lorimar Motion Pictures; Columbia Pictures	—N/a
1986	Flight of the Navigator	Randal Kleiser	Walt Disney Pictures	—N/a
1986	No Mercy	Richard Pearce	TriStar Pictures	—N/a
1987	Critical Condition	Michael Apted	Paramount Pictures	—N/a
1987	Outrageous Fortune	Arthur Hiller	Silver Screen Partners II; Interscope Communications; Touchstone Pictures	Won — BMI Film Music Award
1987	Predator	John McTiernan	Lawrence Gordon Productions; Silver Pictures; Davis Entertainment; 20th Century Fox	Won — Saturn Award for Best Music; Won — BMI Film Music Award
1987	Overboard	Garry Marshall	Metro-Goldwyn-Mayer	—N/a
1988	Mac and Me	Stewart Raffill	Orion Pictures	—N/a
1988	Who Framed Roger Rabbit	Robert Zemeckis	Amblin Entertainment; Touchstone Pictures	Also conductor Won — BMI Film Music Award; Nominated — Saturn Award for Best Music; Nominated — Grammy Award for Best Score Soundtrack for Visual Media
1988	My Stepmother Is an Alien	Richard Benjamin	Weintraub Entertainment Group; Columbia Pictures	—N/a
1989	She's Out of Control	Stan Dragoti	Weintraub Entertainment Group; Columbia Pictures	—N/a
1989	The Abyss	James Cameron	Lightstorm Entertainment (special edition only); 20th Century Fox	Nominated — Saturn Award for Best Music
1989	Back to the Future Part II	Robert Zemeckis	Amblin Entertainment; Universal Pictures	Won — BMI Film Music Award

=== Film - 1990s ===
Year	Title	Director	Studio	Notes
1990	Downtown	Richard Benjamin	20th Century Fox	—N/a
1990	Back to the Future Part III	Robert Zemeckis	Amblin Entertainment; Universal Pictures	Won — Saturn Award for Best Music; Won — BMI Film Music Award
1990	Young Guns II	Geoff Murphy	Morgan Creek Productions; 20th Century Fox	Themes by Anthony Marinelli and Brian Banks
1990	Predator 2	Stephen Hopkins	Silver Pictures; Gordon Company; Davis Entertainment; 20th Century Fox	Also conductor
1991	Shattered	Wolfgang Petersen	Davis Entertainment; Metro-Goldwyn-Mayer	Also orchestrator Replaced Angelo Badalamenti
1991	Back to the Future: The Ride	David De Vos; Douglas Trumbull	Universal Studios Florida	Film in simulator ride
1991	Soapdish	Michael Hoffman	Paramount Pictures	Also orchestrator
1991	Dutch	Peter Faiman	Hughes Entertainment; 20th Century Fox	Also pianist
1991	Ricochet	Russell Mulcahy	HBO Films; Silver Pictures; Warner Bros.	Also conductor
1991	Father of the Bride	Charles Shyer	Sandollar Productions; Touchstone Pictures	Won — BMI Film Music Award
1992	Two-Fisted Tales	Richard Donner; Tom Holland; Robert Zemeckis	Carolco Pictures	Segment: Yellow
1992	Stop! Or My Mom Will Shoot	Roger Spottiswoode	Northern Lights Entertainment; Universal Pictures	—N/a
1992	FernGully: The Last Rainforest	Bill Kroyer	Kroyer Films; FAI Films; 20th Century Fox	Silvestri's first score for a fully animated film
1992	Death Becomes Her	Robert Zemeckis	Universal Pictures	Nominated — Saturn Award for Best Music
1992	Diner	Graham Morris; Karen Peterson	Marvel Productions	Short film
1992	The Bodyguard	Mick Jackson	Tig Productions; Warner Bros.	Won — BMI Film Music Award
1992	Sidekicks	Aaron Norris	Triumph Films	—N/a
1993	In Search of the Obelisk	Douglas Trumbull; Arish Fyzee	IMAX	IMAX film
1993	Cop and a Half	Henry Winkler	Imagine Entertainment; Universal Pictures	—N/a
1993	Super Mario Bros.	Rocky Morton; Annabel Jankel	Allied Filmmakers; Cinergi Pictures; Hollywood Pictures	Replaced Jerry Goldsmith
1993	Judgment Night	Stephen Hopkins	Largo Entertainment; Universal Pictures	Also conductor
1993	Grumpy Old Men	Donald Petrie	Warner Bros.	Won — BMI Film Music Award
1994	Clean Slate	Mick Jackson	Metro-Goldwyn-Mayer	—N/a
1994	Forrest Gump	Robert Zemeckis	Paramount Pictures	Won — BMI Film Music Award; Nominated — Academy Award for Best Original Score; Nominated — Saturn Award for Best Music; Nominated — Golden Globe Award for Best Original Score
1994	Blown Away	Stephen Hopkins	Metro-Goldwyn-Mayer	Also conductor
1994	Richie Rich	Donald Petrie	Harvey Films; Silver Pictures; Davis Entertainment; Warner Bros. Family Entertainment	—N/a
1995	The Quick and the Dead	Sam Raimi	TriStar Pictures	—N/a
1995	The Perez Family	Mira Nair	The Samuel Goldwyn Company	—N/a
1995	Judge Dredd	Danny Cannon	Cinergi Pictures; Hollywood Pictures	Also conductor Replaced David Arnold and Jerry Goldsmith
1995	Father of the Bride Part II	Charles Shyer	Touchstone Pictures	Won — BMI Film Music Award
1995	Grumpier Old Men	Howard Deutch	Warner Bros.	Won — BMI Film Music Award
1996	Sgt. Bilko	Jonathan Lynn	Imagine Entertainment; Universal Pictures	Also conductor
1996	Mission: Impossible	Brian De Palma	Cruise/Wagner Productions; Paramount Pictures	Rejected Score, replaced by Danny Elfman
1996	Eraser	Chuck Russell	Kopelson Entertainment; Warner Bros.	Also conductor Won — BMI Film Music Award
1996	The Long Kiss Goodnight	Renny Harlin	New Line Cinema	Also conductor
1997	Fools Rush In	Andy Tennant	Columbia Pictures	—N/a
1997	Volcano	Mick Jackson	Original Film; Fox 2000 Pictures; 20th Century Fox	Also conductor
1997	Contact	Robert Zemeckis	Warner Bros.	Won — ASCAP Award for Top Box Office Films; Nominated — Saturn Award for Best Music
1997	Mouse Hunt	Gore Verbinski	DreamWorks Pictures	—N/a
1998	The Odd Couple II	Howard Deutch	Paramount Pictures	Also conductor
1998	The Parent Trap	Nancy Meyers	Walt Disney Pictures	Also conductor
1998	Holy Man	Stephen Herek	Caravan Pictures; Touchstone Pictures	Also conductor
1998	Practical Magic	Griffin Dunne	Village Roadshow Pictures; Warner Bros.	Also conductor Replaced Michael Nyman
1999	Siegfried & Roy: The Magic Box	Brett Leonard	IMAX	IMAX film
1999	Stuart Little	Rob Minkoff	Columbia Pictures	Also conductor Won — ASCAP Award for Top Box Office Films

=== Film - 2000s ===
Year	Title	Director	Studio	Notes
2000	Reindeer Games	John Frankenheimer	Dimension Films; Miramax Films	Also conductor
2000	Cast Away	Robert Zemeckis	ImageMovers; Playtone; 20th Century Fox (US); DreamWorks Pictures (International)	Also conductor Won — ASCAP Award for Top Box Office Films
2000	What Lies Beneath	Robert Zemeckis	ImageMovers; DreamWorks Pictures (US); 20th Century Fox (International)	Also conductor and orchestrator Won — ASCAP Award for Top Box Office Films
2000	What Women Want	Nancy Meyers	Icon Productions; Wind Dancer Films; Paramount Pictures	Also conductor and orchestrator
2001	The Mexican	Gore Verbinski	DreamWorks Pictures	Also conductor and orchestrator
2001	The Mummy Returns	Stephen Sommers	Alphaville Films; Universal Pictures	Replaced Jerry Goldsmith; Won — ASCAP Award for Top Box Office Films
2001	Serendipity	Peter Chelsom	Tapestry Films; Miramax Films	Also conductor
2002	Showtime	Tom Dey	Village Roadshow Pictures; Warner Bros.	Also conductor and orchestrator
2002	Lilo & Stitch	Chris Sanders; Dean DeBlois	Walt Disney Feature Animation; Walt Disney Pictures	Also choir arranger and conductor Won — ASCAP Award for Top Box Office Films; Nominated — Annie Award for Outstanding Achievement for Music in a Feature Production
2002	Stuart Little 2	Rob Minkoff	Red Wagon Entertainment; Columbia Pictures	Also conductor
2002	Maid in Manhattan	Wayne Wang	Hughes Entertainment; Revolution Studios; Columbia Pictures	—N/a
2003	Identity	James Mangold	Konrad Pictures; Columbia Pictures	Also conductor Replaced Angelo Badalamenti
2003	Stitch! The Movie	Tony Craig; Bobs Gannaway	Walt Disney Television Animation; Walt Disney Pictures	Themes only; score composed by Michael Tavera
2003	Lara Croft: Tomb Raider – The Cradle of Life	Jan de Bont	Mutual Film Company; Lawrence Gordon Productions; Paramount Pictures	Also conductor Replaced Craig Armstrong and Graeme Revell
2003	Two Soldiers	Aaron Schneider	Shoe Clerk Picture Co. Inc. Westlake Entertainment Group	Short film Also conductor
2004	Van Helsing	Stephen Sommers	Universal Pictures	Also conductor Won — ASCAP Award for Top Box Office Films; Won — Saturn Award for Best Music
2004	The Polar Express	Robert Zemeckis	Shangri-La Entertainment; ImageMovers; Playtone; Castle Rock Entertainment; Warner Bros.	Also conductor Won — ASCAP Award for Top Box Office Films; Nominated — Academy Award for Best Original Song; Nominated — Saturn Award for Best Music; Nominated — Golden Globe Award for Best Original Song; Nominated — Satellite Award for Best Original Song; Nominated — World Soundtrack Award for Best Original Song Written Directly for a Film
2006	The Wild	Steve "Spaz" Williams	C.O.R.E. Walt Disney Pictures	Also conductor
2006	Leroy & Stitch	Tony Craig; Bobs Gannaway	Walt Disney Television Animation; Walt Disney Pictures	Themes only; score composed by J. A. C. Redford
2006	Night at the Museum	Shawn Levy	1492 Pictures; Ingenious Film Partners; 21 Laps Entertainment; 20th Century Fox	—N/a
2007	Beowulf	Robert Zemeckis	Shangri-La Entertainment; ImageMovers; Paramount Pictures (US); Warner Bros. (International)	Also conductor and orchestrator Nominated — World Soundtrack Award for Best Original Song Written Directly for a Film
2009	Night at the Museum: Battle of the Smithsonian	Shawn Levy	Ingenious Film Partners; 21 Laps Entertainment; Dune Entertainment; 1492 Pictures; 20th Century Fox	Also conductor
2009	G.I. Joe: The Rise of Cobra	Stephen Sommers	Hasbro; Spyglass Entertainment; Paramount Pictures	Also conductor and orchestrator
2009	G.I. Joe: The Invasion of Cobra Island	Rupinder Malhotra	RM Productions Ltd. Paramount Pictures	Two-part web film
2009	A Christmas Carol	Robert Zemeckis	ImageMovers Digital; Walt Disney Pictures	Also lyricist, conductor and orchestrator

=== Film - 2010s ===
Year	Title	Director	Studio	Notes
2010	The A-Team	Joe Carnahan	Dune Entertainment; Top Cow Productions; Scott Free Productions; 20th Century Fox	Also conductor and orchestrator Themes by Mike Post and Pete Carpenter
2010	Predators	Nimród Antal	Troublemaker Studios; Davis Entertainment; 20th Century Fox	Themes only; score composed by John Debney
2011	Captain America: The First Avenger	Joe Johnston	Marvel Studios; Paramount Pictures	Also conductor and orchestrator "Star Spangled Man" by Alan Menken with lyrics by David Zippel; Nominated — Saturn Award for Best Music; Nominated — BMI Film Music Award
2012	The Avengers	Joss Whedon	Marvel Studios; Walt Disney Studios Motion Pictures	Known as Avengers Assemble in some territories Also conductor and orchestrator
2012	Flight	Robert Zemeckis	ImageMovers; Parkes+McDonald Image Nation; Paramount Pictures	—N/a
2013	The Croods	Chris Sanders; Kirk DeMicco	DreamWorks Animation; 20th Century Fox	Also conductor and orchestrator
2013	Red 2	Dean Parisot	DC Entertainment; Di Bonaventura Pictures; Summit Entertainment; Lionsgate	Themes by Christophe Beck
2014	Night at the Museum: Secret of the Tomb	Shawn Levy	1492 Pictures; 21 Laps Entertainment; 20th Century Fox	—N/a
2015	Avengers: Age of Ultron	Joss Whedon	Marvel Studios; Walt Disney Studios Motion Pictures	Themes only; score composed by Brian Tyler and Danny Elfman
2015	The Walk	Robert Zemeckis	ImageMovers; TriStar Pictures	—N/a
2015	Doc Brown Saves the World	Glenn Sanders; Brett Levisohn; Thomas Guindon	Amblin Entertainment; Universal Pictures	Back To the Future short film
2016	Allied	Robert Zemeckis	GK Films; ImageMovers (uncredited); Huahua Media; Paramount Pictures	—N/a
2018	Ready Player One	Steven Spielberg	Village Roadshow Pictures; Amblin Entertainment; Warner Bros. Pictures	Replaced John Williams; Fourth Spielberg theatrical film without his long-time composer John Williams since Twilight Zone: The Movie (1983), The Color Purple (1985), Bridge of Spies (2015)
2018	Avengers: Infinity War	Anthony & Joe Russo	Marvel Studios; Walt Disney Studios Motion Pictures	Score composer only. Score orchestrated and conducted by Mark Graham "Black Panther Theme" by Ludwig Göransson
2018	Welcome to Marwen	Robert Zemeckis	ImageMovers; Perfect World Pictures; Universal Pictures; DreamWorks Pictures	Also conductor
2018	The Predator	Shane Black	Davis Entertainment; 20th Century Fox	Themes only; score composed by Henry Jackman
2019	Avengers: Endgame	Anthony & Joe Russo	Marvel Studios; Walt Disney Studios Motion Pictures	Score conducted with Mark Graham "Ant-Man Theme" by Christophe Beck "Doctor Strange Theme" by Michael Giacchino "Captain Marvel Theme" by Pinar Toprak; Nominated — Grammy Award for Best Score Soundtrack for Visual Media

=== Film - 2020s ===
Year	Title	Director	Studio	Notes
2020	Father of the Bride Part 3(ish)	Nancy Meyers	Netflix Original Films; The Meyers/Shyer Company	—N/a
2020	The Witches	Robert Zemeckis	ImageMovers; Necropia Entertainment; Esperanto Filmoj; Double Dare You Productions; Warner Bros.	—N/a
2022	Pinocchio	Robert Zemeckis	ImageMovers; Depth of Field; Walt Disney Pictures; Disney+	Also lyricist, conductor and orchestrator
2024	Here	Robert Zemeckis	Miramax; ImageMovers; Playtone; Sony Pictures Releasing	—N/a
2025	The Electric State	Anthony & Joe Russo	Netflix; AGBO; Skybound Entertainment	Also conductor Replaced Steve Jablonsky
2025	Lilo & Stitch	Dean Fleischer Camp	Walt Disney Pictures; Rideback	Themes only; score composed by Dan Romer
2025	The Fantastic Four: First Steps	Matt Shakman	Marvel Studios; Walt Disney Studios Motion Pictures	Mid-Credits scene only; score composed by Michael Giacchino
2025	Play Dirty	Shane Black	Team Downey; Modern Pictures; Big Indie Pictures; Amazon MGM Studios	—N/a
2026	Behemoth!	Tony Gilroy	Searchlight Pictures	Score composed with: James Newton Howard, Brandon Roberts and Michael Giacchino
2026	Avengers: Doomsday	Anthony & Joe Russo	Marvel Studios; AGBO; Walt Disney Studios Motion Pictures	—N/a
2027	Avengers: Secret Wars	Anthony & Joe Russo	Marvel Studios; AGBO; Walt Disney Studios Motion Pictures	—N/a

=== Television ===
Year	Title	Channel	Notes
1978–1979	Starsky & Hutch	ABC	3 episodes
1978–1983	CHiPs	NBC	95 episodes
1983	Manimal	NBC	5 episodes
1983	T. J. Hooker	ABC – CBS	Episode: "A Child Is Missing"
1986	Amazing Stories	NBC	Episode: "Go to the Head of Class"
1989–1995	Tales from the Crypt	HBO	7 episodes
1991–1992	Back to the Future	CBS	Theme only
2014	Cosmos: A Spacetime Odyssey	Fox / National Geographic Channel	13 episodes Primetime Emmy Award for Outstanding Music Composition for a Series (for "Standing Up in the Milky Way"); Primetime Emmy Award for Outstanding Original Main Title Theme Music
2020	Cosmos: Possible Worlds	Fox / National Geographic Channel	13 episodes

=== Other credits ===
- Back in Time (2015), guest role
- Back to the Future: The Musical (2022), composer, lyrics written with Glen Ballard
- Rogers: The Musical (2023), themes only; score composed and lyrics written by Christopher Lennertz, Alan Menken and Marc Shaiman with David Zippel, Scott Wittman, Jordan Peterson and Alex Karukas
- Music by John Williams (2024), guest role

== Awards and nominations ==
Silvestri has received two Academy Award nominations: Best Original Score for Forrest Gump (1994); and Best Original Song for "Believe" on The Polar Express soundtrack. He also received two Golden Globe nominations: Best Score for Forrest Gump and Best Song for The Polar Express. Silvestri received an honorary Doctorate of Music from Berklee College of Music in 1995.

He has also received nine Grammy Award nominations, winning two awards: Best Song Written for a Motion Picture, Television or Other Visual Media for "Believe" from The Polar Express in 2004; and Best Instrumental Composition for "Cast Away End Credits" from Cast Away in 2002. His other nominations were for Best Album of Original Score Written for a Motion Picture or a Television Special and Best Instrumental Composition, for Back to the Future in 1985, Best Album of Original Instrumental Background Score Written for a Motion Picture or Television, for Who Framed Roger Rabbit in 1988, Best Instrumental Composition, for "Who Framed Roger Rabbit Suite" in 1989, Best Pop Instrumental Performance, for "I'm Forrest...Forrest Gump (The Feather Theme)" in 1994, Best Instrumental Composition, for Avengers: Infinity War in 2018, and Best Score Soundtrack For Visual Media, for Avengers: Endgame in 2019. During the 2005 Grammy Awards, Josh Groban performed "Believe".

He has won two Emmys, both for Cosmos: A Spacetime Odyssey – Outstanding Main Title Theme Music and Outstanding Music Composition for a Series for the episode "Standing Up in the Milky Way". He has won the Saturn Award for Best Music three times, for his scores for Predator (1987), Back to the Future Part III (1989/90), and Van Helsing (2004). On September 23, 2011, he received the Max Steiner Film Music Achievement Award from the City of Vienna the yearly film-music gala concert Hollywood in Vienna.

Association	Year	Category	Project	Result	Ref.
Academy Awards	1994	Best Original Score	Forrest Gump	Nominated	
Academy Awards	2004	Best Original Song	The Polar Express ("Believe")	Nominated	
Golden Globe Awards	1994	Best Original Score	Forrest Gump	Nominated	
Golden Globe Awards	2004	Best Original Song	The Polar Express ("Believe")	Nominated	
Primetime Emmy Awards	2014	Outstanding Original Main Title Theme Music	Cosmos: A Spacetime Odyssey	Won	
Primetime Emmy Awards	2014	Outstanding Music Composition for a Series	Cosmos: A Spacetime Odyssey ("Standing Up in the Milky Way")	Won	
Grammy Awards	1986	Best Instrumental Composition	Back to the Future	Nominated	
Grammy Awards	1986	Best Score Soundtrack for Visual Media	Back to the Future	Nominated	
Grammy Awards	1989	Best Score Soundtrack for Visual Media	Who Framed Roger Rabbit	Nominated	
Grammy Awards	1990	Best Instrumental Composition	Who Framed Roger Rabbit ("Who Framed Roger Rabbit Suite")	Nominated	
Grammy Awards	1995	Best Pop Instrumental Performance	Forrest Gump	Nominated	
Grammy Awards	2002	Best Instrumental Composition	Cast Away ("End Credits")	Won	
Grammy Awards	2006	Best Song Written for Visual Media	The Polar Express ("Believe")	Won	
Grammy Awards	2019	Best Instrumental Composition	Avengers: Infinity War	Nominated	
Grammy Awards	2020	Best Score Soundtrack for Visual Media	Avengers: Endgame	Nominated	

== See also ==
- Music of Back to the Future
- Music of the Marvel Cinematic Universe
