= Standing Up in the Milky Way =

- Cosmos: A Spacetime Odyssey episode
- Episode no.: Episode 1
- Directed by: Brannon Braga
- Written by: Ann Druyan: Steven Soter
- Narrated by: Neil deGrasse Tyson
- Editing by: John Duffy; Michael O'Halloran; Eric Lea
- Production code: 101
- Original air date: March 9, 2014
- Running time: 44 minutes

Guest appearance
- Seth MacFarlane as Giordano Bruno

Episode chronology
← Previous —	Next → "Some of the Things That Molecules Do"

"Standing Up in the Milky Way" is the first aired episode of the American documentary television series Cosmos: A Spacetime Odyssey. It premiered on March 9, 2014, simultaneously on various Fox television networks, including National Geographic Channel, FX, Fox Life, and others. The episode is presented by the series host astrophysicist Neil deGrasse Tyson, directed by Brannon Braga, produced by Livia Hanich and Steven Holtzman, and written by Ann Druyan and Steven Soter.

The series represents a follow-up of the 1980s television series Cosmos: A Personal Voyage by Carl Sagan, now hosted by Tyson, and explores astronomy, space and time, astrophysics, biology, and other diverse areas of science. In this episode, Tyson takes a tour of the Solar System and the Milky Way galaxy, explores the life of Renaissance philosopher Giordano Bruno and his vision of the cosmos, goes through a Cosmic Calendar from the beginning of the universe until the present, and ends with a tribute to Carl Sagan. The episode was first presented with a brief introduction by the President of the United States Barack Obama.

The episode received positive reviews by critics, but was criticized on issues like the historical accuracy in the presentation of Giordano Bruno's life. It was also nominated for Primetime Emmy Award for Outstanding Music Composition for a Series at the 66th Primetime Creative Arts Emmy Awards, an award it won.

== Episode summary ==
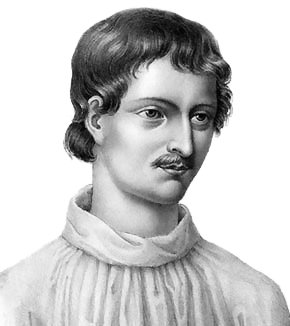
The astronomical theories of Giordano Bruno (1548–1600) and their reception by the Catholic Church were featured in the episode's narrative sequence.

The episode begins with Tyson setting off on the "Ship of the Imagination" to discover Earth’s cosmic address within the Virgo Supercluster and its place in space and time. As the viewer floats along with him past the planets of the Solar System, he skims over Venus; he shows this planet's intense greenhouse effect, as well as its extremely high temperatures. Then he explores Jupiter's Great Red Spot, a hurricane three times the size of Earth, and provides the first comparison showing how Earth's size diminishes when contrasted with the Spot's expanding view. He passes Voyager 1, the farthest man-made object from Earth, and explains the Voyager Golden Record and its purpose.

Tyson explains how human sight is limited in the cosmos and, as an example, shows us how extremely dark rogue planets are "seen" with infrared sensors. He then examines the bubble theory, and how the observable universe might be just a bubble in a "never-ending" set of bubbles, analogous to drops of a waterfall.

In an animated segment of this episode, Tyson discusses the life and vision of the 16th-century Italian philosopher Giordano Bruno (voiced by Seth MacFarlane) as the person who championed a much more expansive understanding of the Earth's place in the universe, with the Sun being just one star among all the others. (Tyson subsequently dismisses Bruno's visionary experiences as unscientific, but is sympathetic to the persecution he suffered.) Later, he presents the history of the Universe on Carl Sagan's Cosmic Calendar. The episode ends with Tyson's brief speech about Carl Sagan's life and career, and how Sagan inspired him to become an astrophysicist.

== Production ==
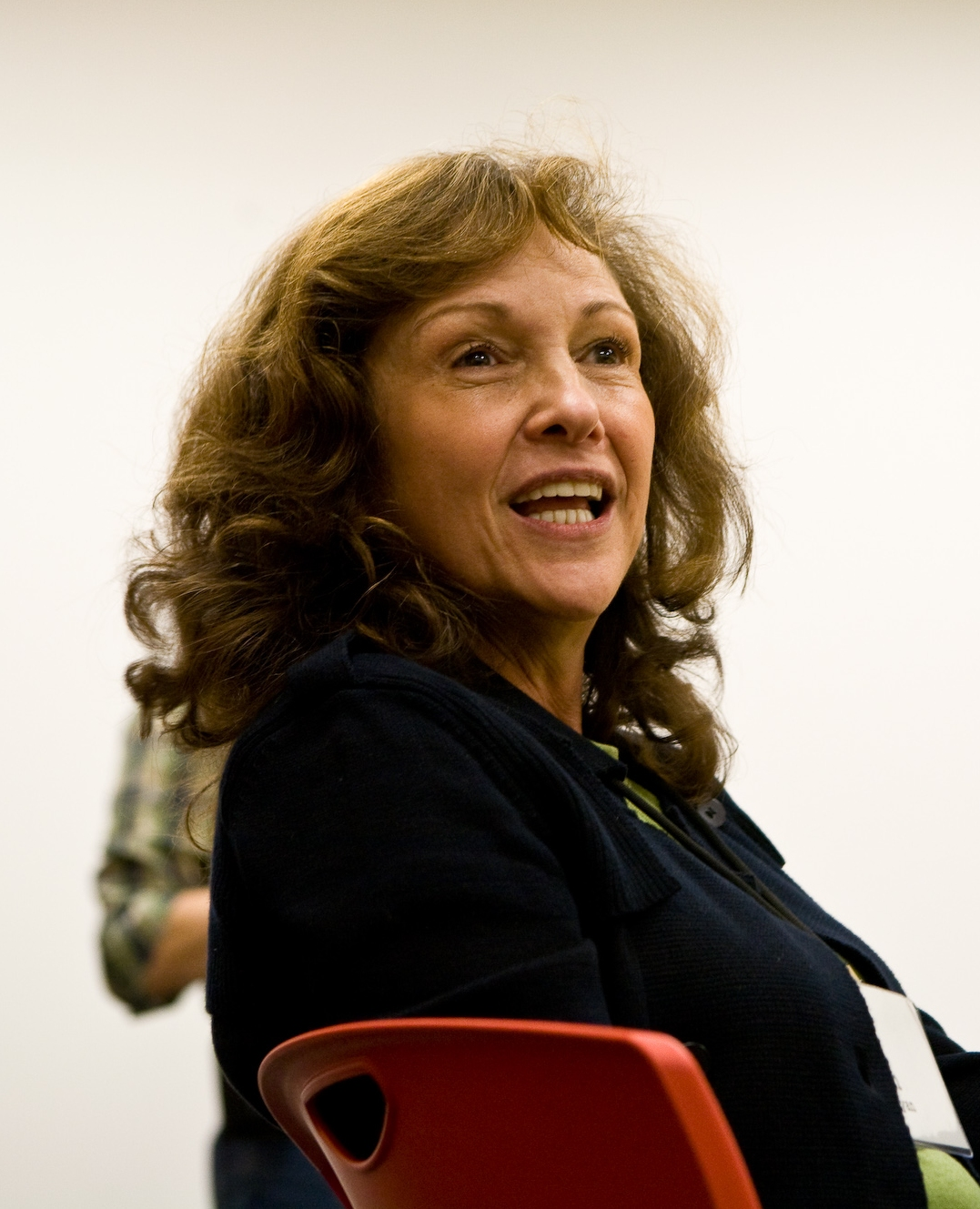
Carl Sagan's widow Ann Druyan co-wrote the episode.

Ann Druyan, Steven Soter, and astrophysicist Neil deGrasse Tyson were planning on producing a new, updated sequel to Carl Sagan's Cosmos: A Personal Voyage and continued pitching the idea to various television stations even after Sagan's death. In 2008 producer Seth MacFarlane met with Tyson at the Science & Entertainment Exchange, where Tyson told him about rebooting the Cosmos series. MacFarlane took interest in the idea and presented it to the Fox Broadcasting Company television network.

"Standing Up in the Milky Way" was directed by Brannon Braga, and written by Druyan and Soter. The narrative sequence of the episode introduced the life of philosopher Giordano Bruno voiced by the series' executive producer Seth MacFarlane, and other additional characters voiced by MacFarlane and actor Paul Telfer. The special effects for the episode were done by the DIVE VFX studio from New York City including "dimensionalization of star clusters, galaxies and nebula" for the show. The episode also introduces a new "Ship of the Imagination" redesigned by concept artist Ryan Church, which was described by The Verge as "J. J. Abrams’ Enterprise." The animated sequences of the episode were produced by Kara Vallow.

== Reception ==
"Seth MacFarlane and Neil deGrasse Tyson present a unique and riveting glimpse at our universe in Cosmos: A Spacetime Odyssey. Embracing science and all it has to offer, the docu-series is unapologetic in its somewhat controversial depiction of organized religion, but it extends an olive branch for creative thinking and plays with concepts of faith in its whimsical view of the macrocosm."

— Max Nicholson, from IGN

The episode premiered with a 2.1/5 in the 18-49 rating/share and 5.77 million Americans watching it live on Fox. However, Nielsen estimated that a total of "8.5 million watched Sunday on the total of 10 Fox-owned networks, including Fox broadcast, National Geographic and FX." Series executive producer Seth MacFarlane posted on the online social networking website Twitter that 12 million overall viewers watched the Cosmos premiere live in the US alone and 17.5 million with DVR.

"Standing Up in the Milky Way" was critically well accepted. John Teti from The A.V. Club gave the episode a mark of "B". He stated "Cosmos: A Spacetime Odyssey is both ambitious and quaint. It attempts to convey humanity’s most expansive ideas in the space of a weekly 44-minute TV series. That’s ambitious," giving a positive review on the show's creation. He did criticize the show for its "sloppy scripting that crops up more often later in the episode." Max Nicholson from IGN gave the episode a grade of 8.5 ("Great"), concluding "the docu-series is unapologetic in its somewhat controversial depiction of organized religion, but it extends an olive branch for creative thinking and plays with concepts of faith in its whimsical view of the macrocosm." A positive review was also given by Slate journalist Phil Plait, who said that he sees the episode "as making the more interesting and bigger point about suppression of thought and the grandeur of freedom of exploration of ideas."

Other reviews have criticized the historical accuracy of the segment on Giordano Bruno and question why the show did not portray more important astronomers of the time period, such as Copernicus or Galileo, or earlier medieval natural philosophers, such as Nicole Oresme and Nicholas of Cusa, who presented the possibility of a plurality of worlds centuries earlier than Bruno. Reviewers also complained that the segment was historically inaccurate in its portrayal of Bruno's troubles as stemming almost entirely from his belief in many worlds.

During the premier broadcast of the episode on March 9, 2014, on Oklahoma City Fox affiliate KOKH-TV, the episode was interrupted for 15 seconds. The brief interruption of the episode by an advertisement for FOX 25 Primetime News at Nine coincided with a monologue by Tyson in which he describes human evolution. KOKH issued a statement of apology for the event, which also rejected accusations that the incident was intentional, but "the result of operator error."
