= Bill Pope =

American cinematographer

- Born: June 19, 1952 (age 74); Bowling Green, Kentucky, U.S.
- Years active: 1976–present
- Spouse: Sharon Oreck
- Children: 2
- Relatives: Leslie Pope (sister)

Bill Pope, A.S.C. (born June 19, 1952) is an American cinematographer best known for his collaborations with directors such as Sam Raimi, The Wachowskis, and Edgar Wright.

== Early life and education ==
Pope was born in Bowling Green, Kentucky.

He attended College High School and New York University, where he received his master's degree in Fine Arts. Prior to graduation, Pope worked as the cinematographer on a student film entitled The Sixth Week which won an Oscar for Achievement in Documentary at the 5th Annual Student Academy Awards on May 21, 1978.

== Filmography ==
=== Film ===
Key
†	Denotes films that have not yet been released

Year	Title	Director	Notes
1990	Darkman	Sam Raimi	
1991	Closet Land	Radha Bharadwaj	
1992	Army of Darkness	Sam Raimi	
1993	Fire in the Sky	Robert Lieberman	
1994	Blank Check	Rupert Wainwright	
1995	Clueless	Amy Heckerling	
1996	Bound	The Wachowskis	
1997	Gridlock'd	Vondie Curtis-Hall	
1998	Zero Effect	Jake Kasdan	
1999	The Matrix	The Wachowskis	
2000	Bedazzled	Harold Ramis	
2003	The Matrix Reloaded	The Wachowskis	Shot back-to-back
2003	The Matrix Revolutions	The Wachowskis	Shot back-to-back
2004	Spider-Man 2	Sam Raimi	
2004	Team America: World Police	Trey Parker	
2006	Fur	Steven Shainberg	
2007	Spider-Man 3	Sam Raimi	
2008	The Spirit	Frank Miller	
2010	Scott Pilgrim vs. the World	Edgar Wright	
2012	Chasing Mavericks	Michael Apted; Curtis Hanson	
2012	Men in Black 3	Barry Sonnenfeld	
2013	The World's End	Edgar Wright	
2016	The Jungle Book	Jon Favreau	
2017	Baby Driver	Edgar Wright	
2019	The Kid Who Would Be King	Joe Cornish	
2019	Alita: Battle Angel	Robert Rodriguez	
2019	Charlie's Angels	Elizabeth Banks	
2020	The Boys in the Band	Joe Mantello	
2021	Shang-Chi and the Legend of the Ten Rings	Destin Daniel Cretton	Credited as "William Pope"
2023	Ant-Man and the Wasp: Quantumania	Peyton Reed	
2024	Y2K	Kyle Mooney	
2024	Unfrosted	Jerry Seinfeld	Credited as "William Pope"
2025	How to Train Your Dragon	Dean DeBlois	
2026	Send Help	Sam Raimi	
2027	How to Train Your Dragon 2 †	Dean DeBlois	Post-production

=== Television ===
Year	Title	Director	Notes
1992	American Playhouse	Robert Allan Ackerman	Episode "Mrs. Cage"
1998	Maximum Bob	Barry Sonnenfeld	Episode "Pilot"
1999	Freaks and Geeks	Jake Kasdan	Episode "Pilot"
2014	Cosmos: A Spacetime Odyssey	Brannon Braga; Himself; Ann Druyan	Documentary series; 13 episodes
2016	Preacher	Seth Rogen; Evan Goldberg	Episode "Pilot"

=== Video games ===
Year	Title	Notes
2003	Enter the Matrix	Live-action cinematographer

=== Music video ===
Year	Title	Artist
1983	"Hold Back the Night"	Aldo Nova
1984	"Bitchen Party"	Lopez Beatles
1986	"Nasty"	Janet Jackson
1986	"Mercy Street"	Peter Gabriel
1986	"Red Rain"	Peter Gabriel
1987	"We'll Be Together"	Sting
1987	"The Ledge"	The Replacements
1988	"In Your Room"	The Bangles
1988	"I Did It For Love"	Night Ranger
1988	"That's That"	Michael Johnson
1989	"One"	Metallica
1989	"After All This Time"	Rodney Crowell
1990	"Without You"	Mötley Crüe
1995	"Somebody's Crying"	Chris Isaak
1995	"Go Walking Down There"	Chris Isaak
1996	"Graduation Day"	Chris Isaak
2013	"Hold On, We're Going Home"	Drake
2014	"Gust of Wind"	Pharrell Williams
2018	"Colors"	Beck

== Nominations ==
Year	Award	Category	Title	Result
1996	Independent Spirit Awards	Best Cinematography	Bound	Nominated
1999	BAFTA Awards	Best Cinematography	The Matrix	Nominated
2004	Satellite Awards	Best Cinematography	Spider-Man 2	Nominated
2014	Primetime Emmy Awards	Outstanding Cinematography	Cosmos: A Spacetime Odyssey (For episode "Standing Up in the Milky Way")	Nominated
2016	Satellite Awards	Best Cinematography	The Jungle Book	Nominated
