= Steven Soter =

American physicist (born 1943)

- Born: May 1943 (age 83); Los Angeles, California, U.S.
- Education: University of California, Los Angeles (BS); Cornell University (PhD)
- Known for: Cosmos: A Personal Voyage, Cosmos: A Spacetime Odyssey
- Awards: Primetime Emmy Award (for writing of Cosmos)
- Scientific career
- Fields: Physical cosmology, astrophysics
- Doctoral advisors: Thomas Gold, Carl Sagan, Joseph Burns

Steven Soter (born May 1943) is an astrophysicist currently holding the positions of scientist-in-residence for New York University's Environmental Studies Program and of Research Associate for the Department of Astrophysics at the American Museum of Natural History. He is a proponent of the International Astronomical Union's definition of planet.

== Education ==
Soter received his bachelor's degree in astronomy and physics from UCLA in 1965 (advisors George Abell and Peter Goldreich) and his doctorate in astronomy from Cornell University in 1971 (advisors Thomas Gold, Carl Sagan, and Joseph Burns).

== Career in astrophysics ==
In 1974, Soter suggested that dust produced by meteoritic bombardment of Saturn's moon Phoebe might orbit the planet until colliding with Saturn's moon Iapetus and be responsible for the unique dark-bright dichotomy of the latter. Although not the unique cause, dust originating from Saturn's irregular satellites was later found in data from the Cassini spacecraft to indeed play a crucial role in the coloration of Iapetus. The discovery of Saturn's "Phoebe ring" in 2009 further strengthened the probability that this process first described by Soter plays a significant role in shaping Iapetus's appearance.

In 1977-1979, Soter co-wrote, along with Carl Sagan and Ann Druyan, Carl Sagan's monumental 1980 astronomy documentary series Cosmos. Since then, he has also acted as advisor on a number of science documentaries, such as the IMAX films Blue Planet and Cosmic Voyage.

In 1997, Soter took a position at the American Museum of Natural History's Hayden Planetarium, and eventually progressed to the position of research associate. He also made significant contributions to research related to the ancient Greek city Helike.

In 2007, after the IAU voted on a definition of planet, Soter published an article in Scientific American in which he outlined a mathematical formulation, the "planetary discriminant," to describe how the IAU's requirement that a planet must have "cleared its neighborhood" of other objects might be applied in practice. He had already written a more technical article on the same subject in 2006, submitted to The Astronomical Journal before the IAU resolution.

In 2014, he partnered with Druyan again to co-write a new television miniseries, Cosmos: A Spacetime Odyssey, hosted by his AMNH colleague Neil deGrasse Tyson.
