= RW Hotel =

Hotel in Hulu Selangor, Selangor, Malaysia

- Hotel RW
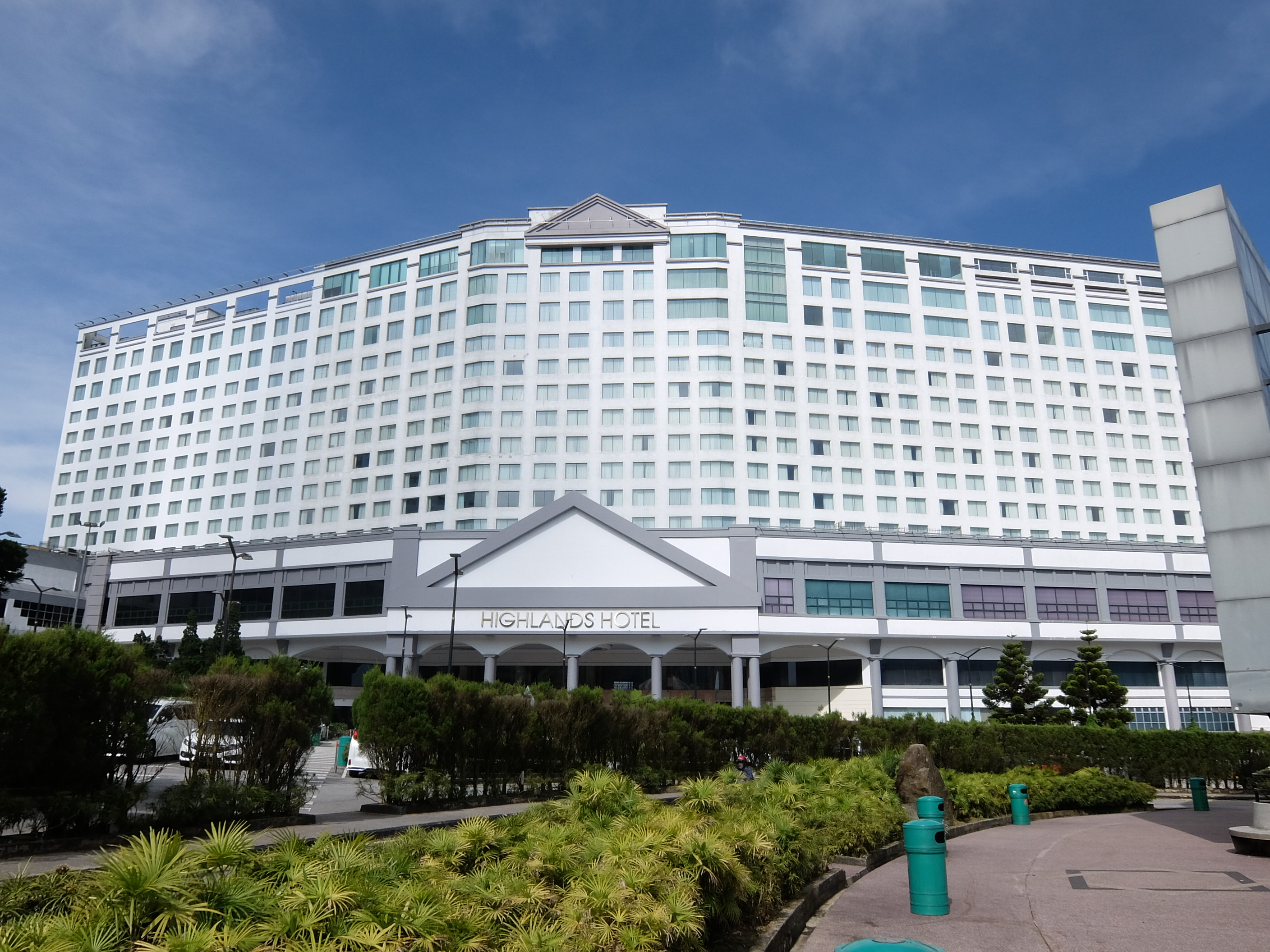
- The hotel prior to its 2026 rebranding
- Interactive map of the RW Hotel area
- Former names: Highlands Hotel; Maxims

General information
- Type: Hotel
- Location: Genting Highlands, Hulu Selangor District, Selangor, Malaysia
- Coordinates: 3°25′25.4″N 101°47′28.6″E
- Opened: 1997

Technical details
- Floor count: 28

Website
- Official website

RW Hotel, formerly known as Highlands Hotel and Maxims, is a 28-storey luxury hotel at Resorts World Genting in Genting Highlands, Malaysia. Although the resort uses a Pahang postal address, the property is situated within Mukim Batang Kali in Hulu Selangor District, Selangor.

The hotel opened in 1997 as the Highlands Hotel. It was renamed Maxims in 2013 and later reverted to Highlands Hotel before adopting its current name on 11 May 2026 as part of a portfolio-wide brand restructuring.

== Location ==
RW Hotel stands within the hilltop precinct of Resorts World Genting. While the resort complex straddles the state boundary and uses a Pahang postal code, cadastral and municipal records place the hotel building within the state of Selangor.

Corporate filings by parent company Genting Berhad list the 28-storey hotel and its Car Park IV as properties in Hulu Selangor, covering a total built-up area of 149,941 square metres (1,613,950 sq ft). The complex also falls within the statutory planning zone of the Hulu Selangor Municipal Council under the Genting Highlands Special Area Plan (Rancangan Kawasan Khas Genting Highlands Hulu Selangor).

== History ==
Construction of the original Highlands Hotel was completed alongside Car Park IV in late 1996, and the hotel officially welcomed its first guests in 1997.

In 2013, Genting Malaysia rearranged the names of its flagship hilltop hotels: the original Maxims Genting became Genting Grand, while the Highlands Hotel took over the Maxims name. The property operated under the Maxims brand for roughly a decade before reverting to Highlands Hotel in the early 2020s.

On 11 May 2026, Resorts World Genting rebranded the building as RW Hotel, establishing it as the resort's premier hospitality flagship. The neighbouring Resort Hotel subsequently assumed the Highlands Hotel moniker.

== Features ==
RW Hotel features 753 rooms and suites, with accommodations primarily reserved for casino patrons and Genting Rewards members holding Gold tier or above. It is listed as a Recommended property by Forbes Travel Guide.

Following the 2026 rebranding, guest suites were redesigned to include larger layout options ranging from an Executive Suite (500 sq ft (46 m^{2})) to a Presidential Suite (1,500 sq ft (140 m^{2})) and a multi-bedroom Super Suite (3,300 sq ft (310 m^{2})). A heated indoor pool located on Level 18 is shared among guests of RW Hotel, Genting Grand, and Crockfords.

== Genting SkyWay terminus ==
The complex incorporates the hilltop terminus of the Genting Skyway, which connects Resorts World Genting with Gohtong Jaya. Although the cable car station was built alongside the hotel, it was designed on a structurally independent foundation with expansion joints to isolate dynamic ropeway vibrations from the hotel tower. The terminus is referred to as Resorts World Station.

== See also ==
- Genting Grand Hotel
- Genting Skyway
- Awana Skyway
- Resorts World Genting
