= First World Hotel & Plaza =

Building in Bentong, Pahang, Malaysia

First World Hotel Hotel First World 第一大酒店
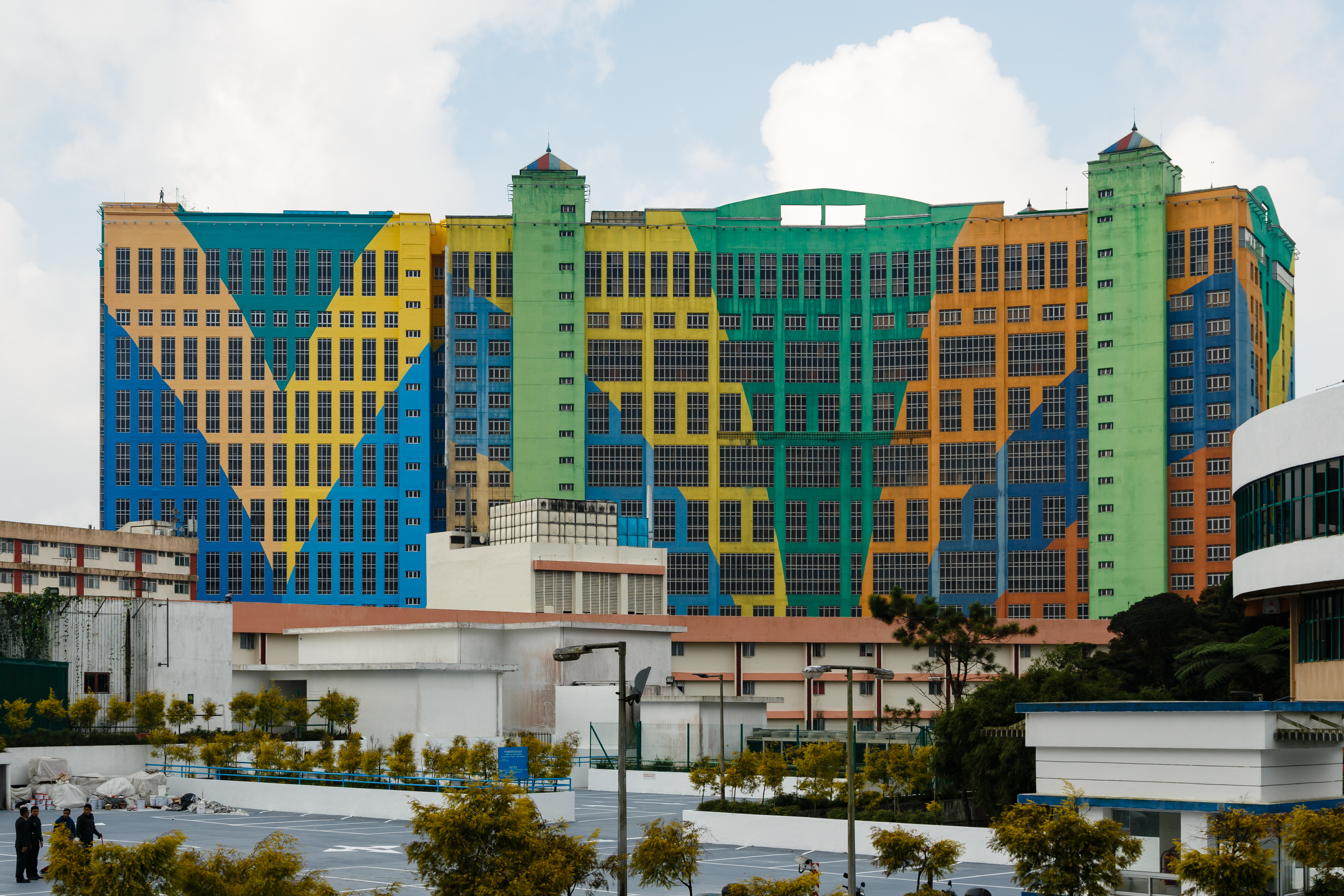

General information
- Location: First World Hotel & Plaza, Resorts World Genting, 69000 Genting Highlands, Pahang, Malaysia
- Coordinates: 3.4253°N 101.7942°E
- Opened: 2001 (Tower 1), 2006 (Tower 2), 2014 (Tower 3)

Technical details
- Floor count: 36 including 8 basements for parking

Other information
- Number of rooms: 7,351

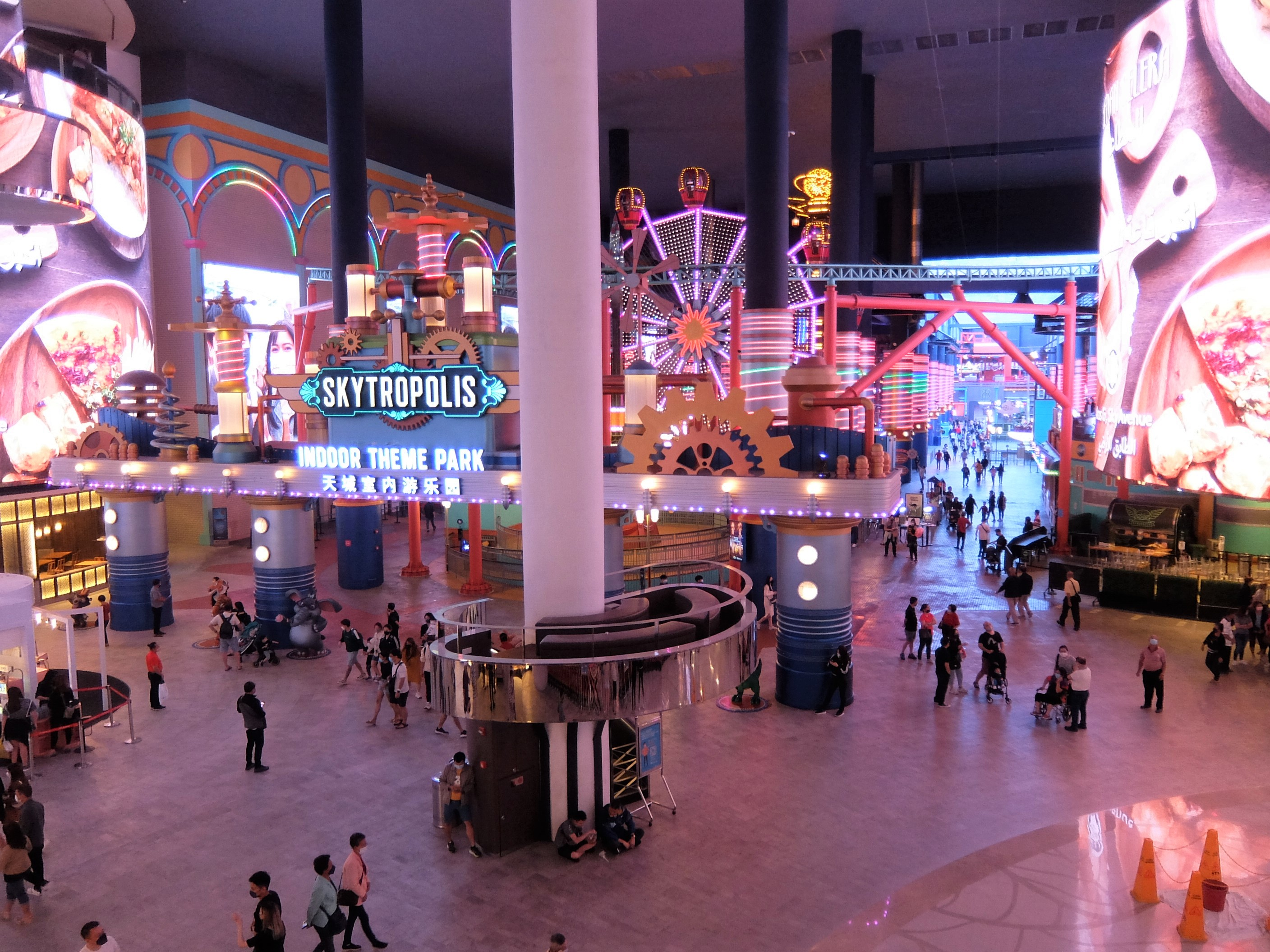
First World Plaza

First World Hotel & Plaza is a hotel, shopping and entertainment complex located at Resorts World Genting in Genting Highlands, Pahang, Malaysia which consists of a 3-star hotel and a plaza. First World Hotel, Resorts Sdn Bhd, a subsidiary of Genting Malaysia Berhad and Genting Group manages the property. It was opened on 26 July 2002 by Prime Minister Mahathir Mohamad. The hotel has been the largest hotel in the world by the number of rooms since its completion in 2015.

== First World Hotel ==
First World Hotel is a 3-star-hotel consisting of three towers and has 7,351 rooms. It has held the Guinness World Records title for the largest hotel in the world by the number of rooms since 2015. The hotel previously held the same title in 2006, then having 6,118 rooms in two towers, Tower 1 and 2. In January 2008, The Palazzo took the title after an expansion of The Venetian located on Las Vegas Strip.

In 2015, the First World Hotel regained the title after opening a new block named Tower 2 Annex (Tower 2A) with 1,233 rooms. The hotel connects to the SkyAvenue shopping mall, which also houses the Awana Skyway station that links to the Genting Highlands Premium Outlets. The First World Hotel is the first hotel in Southeast Asia to launch E-Kiosk or Express Check-in and Check-out kiosks.

== First World Plaza ==
First World Plaza is a shopping centre one floor above the lobby level of the hotel, on 46,000 square metres (500,000 sq ft) of land. It has a casino, retail and dining outlets, an Indoor Theme Park – Skytropolis Funland and other attractions such as Snow World, Genting Bowl, Seni Kome Peng Heng, Big Top Video Games Park and The VOID virtual reality attraction, which occupies nearly 7,000 square feet in the plaza.

Before refurbishment from June 2017 to December 2018, it had few attractions in the plaza including a bowling alley, cineplex, "water splash" pool (a warm indoor swimming pool made for mostly young children), Genting International Convention Centre, a pavilion, Haunted Adventure and a Ripley's Believe It or Not! museum.

== See also ==
- Awana Skyway
- Resorts World Genting
- List of largest hotels
- List of integrated resorts
