= Chin Swee Caves Temple =

Chinese temple in Genting Highlands, Pahang, Malaysia

- Malay: Tokong Gua Chin Swee; Chinese: 清水岩庙
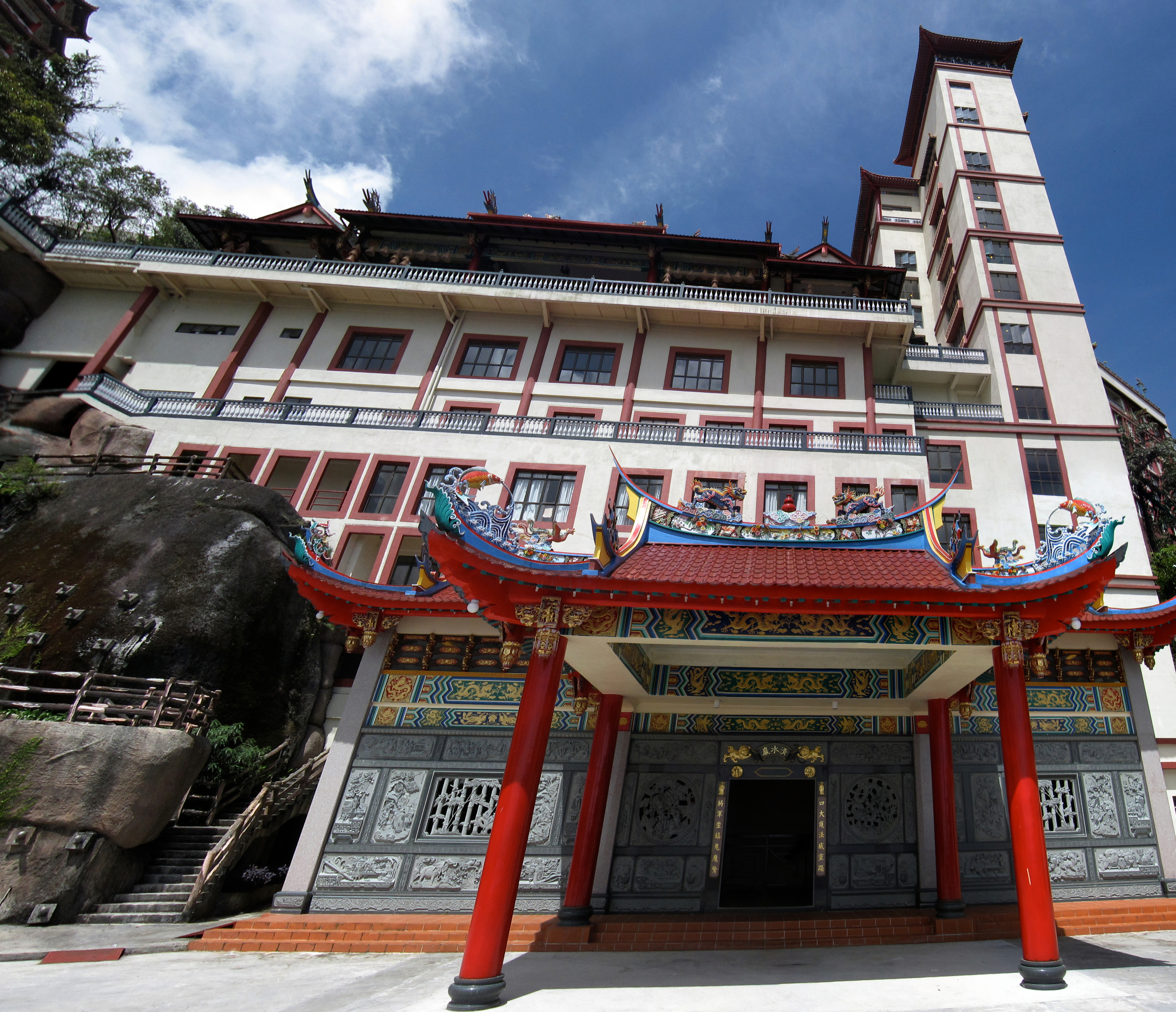
- Front view of Chin Swee Caves Temple

Religion
- Affiliation: Mahayana Buddhism

Location
- Location: Genting Highlands
- State: Pahang
- Country: Malaysia
- Interactive map of Chin Swee Caves Temple
- Coordinates: 3°24′47.534″N 101°47′18.142″E

Architecture
- Type: Chinese temple
- Completed: 1994

Website
- www.chinswee.org

The Chin Swee Caves Temple (Chinese: 清水岩庙; Pinyin: Qīngshuǐ Yán Miào) is a Buddhist temple in Genting Highlands, Pahang, Malaysia. It is situated a scenic site in the Genting Highlands, on a 28-acre plot of rocky forested land donated by Genting Group founder, the late Lim Goh Tong. Located 1400 meters above sea level, the temple is about 5–10 minutes' drive down from the peak of the mountain. Within the temple is a statue of Master Qingshui, a Buddhist monk who has long been worshipped as a deity in Fujian Province, China for his miraculous abilities to summon rain and subdue evil spirits. The temple attracts many local and foreign devotees from Singapore, Taiwan, Vietnam, China, Thailand and Indonesia.

== History ==
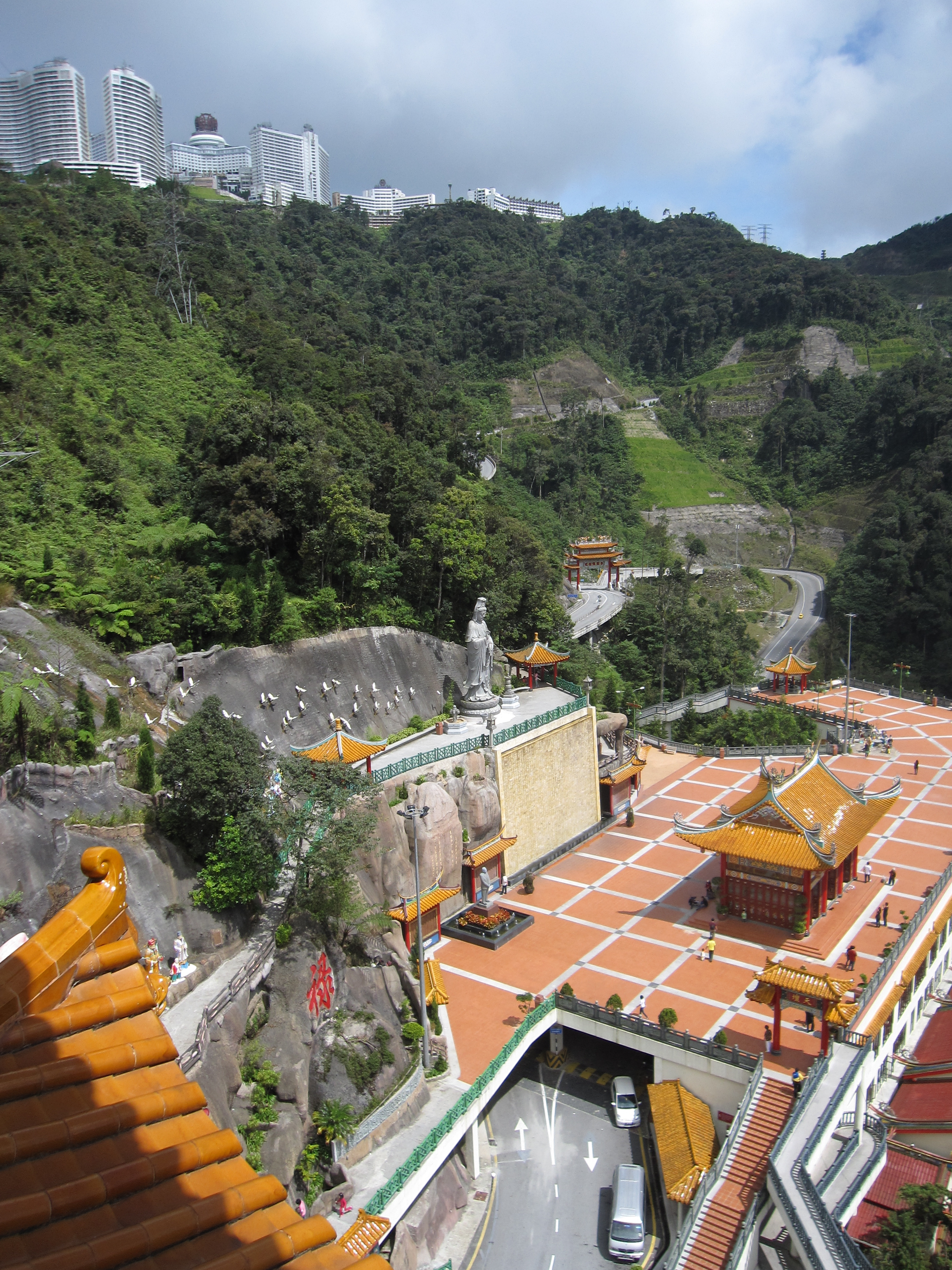
Panoramic view from the temple towards Genting Highlands Resort.

After completing the construction of Genting Highlands Resort in 1975, which at that time consisted only of a hotel with a small casino, Lim Goh Tong began the construction of the temple. He gathered a group of friends, many from his own Anxi clan with shared ancestry in the village of Penglai in Fujian Province, China, and established the Chin Swee Temple Society. Leading by example, Lim donated a 28-acre plot of land for the temple's construction. His companies, Resorts World Bhd and Genting Berhad, contributed RM8.1 million to the building fund. The late Lim was elected as the Chairman of the society while his son, Lim Kok Thay was appointed as its Deputy Chairman.

The temple, which was officially opened on 29 March 1994 by Ling Liong Sik (then the Malaysian Minister of Transport), overlooks lush green slopes of virgin forest with a view of the winding road ascending to Genting Highlands. Construction of the temple was challenging due to the steep and rocky terrain, which rendered modern machinery unusable for essential tasks such as piling. Lim Goh Tong, serving as planner, architect, designer, contractor, and supervisor, opted for manual labour to excavate the foundation. His team dug holes 80 to 100 feet deep on the difficult hillside. Despite the labour-intensive and time-consuming nature of the project, the temple was completed in 18 years. Remarkably, no casualties or work-related accidents were reported throughout the construction period.

== Features ==
Chin Swee Caves Temple
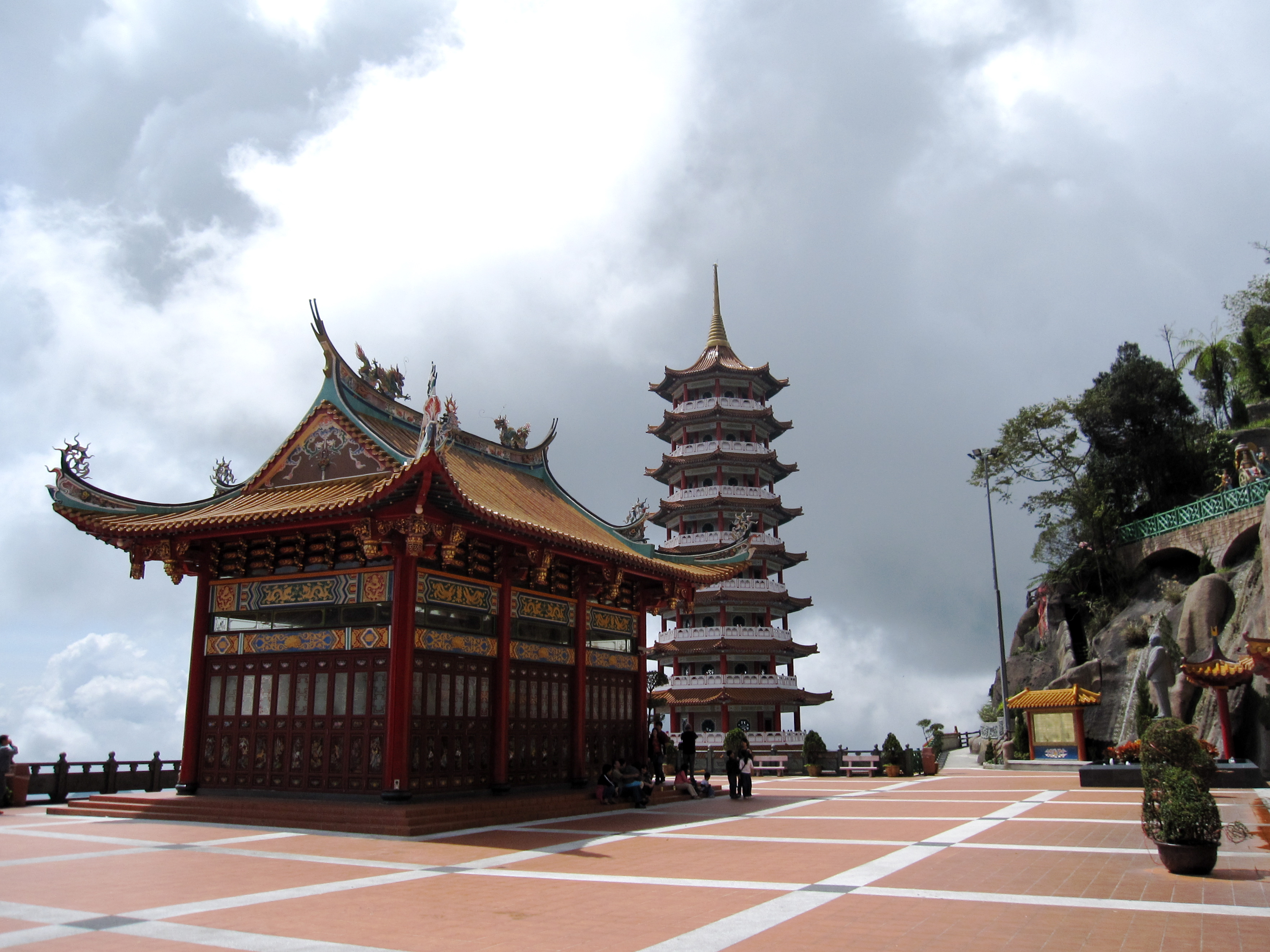
- Hall and pagoda of the Chin Swee Caves Temple.

Chinese name
- Traditional Chinese: 清水岩廟
- Simplified Chinese: 清水岩庙
Transcriptions
Standard Mandarin
- Hanyu Pinyin: Qīngshuǐ Yán Miào
Southern Min
- Hokkien POJ: Chheng-chúi-giâm-biō

Malay name
- Malay: Tokong Gua Chin Swee

The temple's first stage of development, costing an estimated RM12 million, comprises an imposing traditional structure. A massive statue of Buddha stands behind the building. There were originally around 10,000 blessing lamps installed for those looking to be blessed, but 2,000 remain today. The temple has tall red columns supporting an ornamental roof. The exterior wall carries many inscriptions that depict the Reverend Chin Swee's life and his major charitable and supernatural works. Within the temple, the statue of the Reverend Chin Swee placed, as per feng shui principles, at the northern part of the main hall with his face looking south. Behind the statue is a natural rock in a man-made flowing stream. The rock gives the necessary support to the statue while the stream provides clear cool mineral water throughout the year. This water has been named "Dragon Mineral Water" where it could heal the sick. The Reverend Chin Swee's birthday falls on the 6th day of Lunar New Year and is celebrated for ten days beginning from the first day of the Lunar New Year. Going forward and with the completion of these latest additions, the temple committee is planning for more events and celebrations aimed at depicting not only the good deeds of the Reverend Chin Swee but also the richness of the Malaysian Chinese culture.

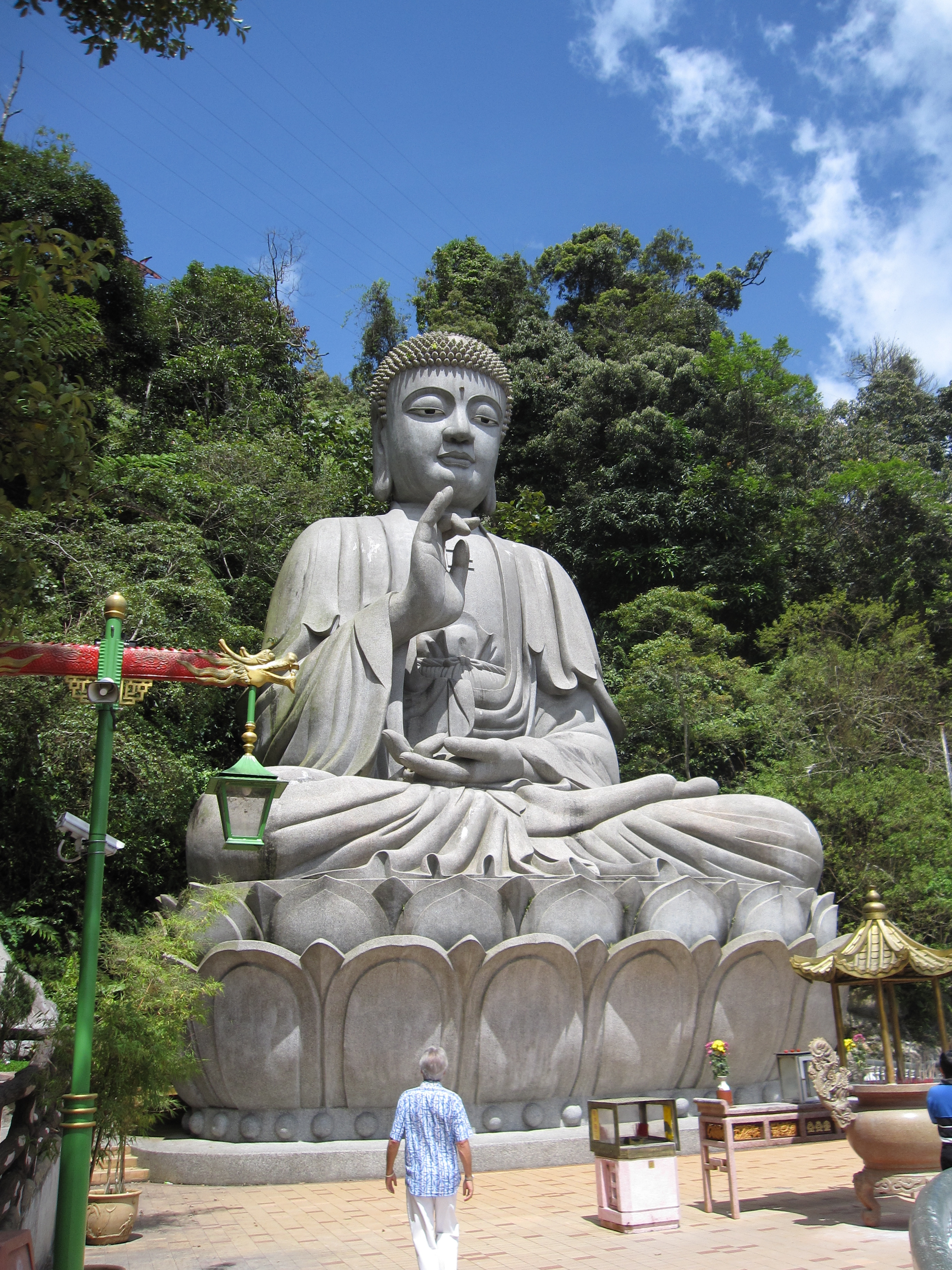
Giant Buddha statue.

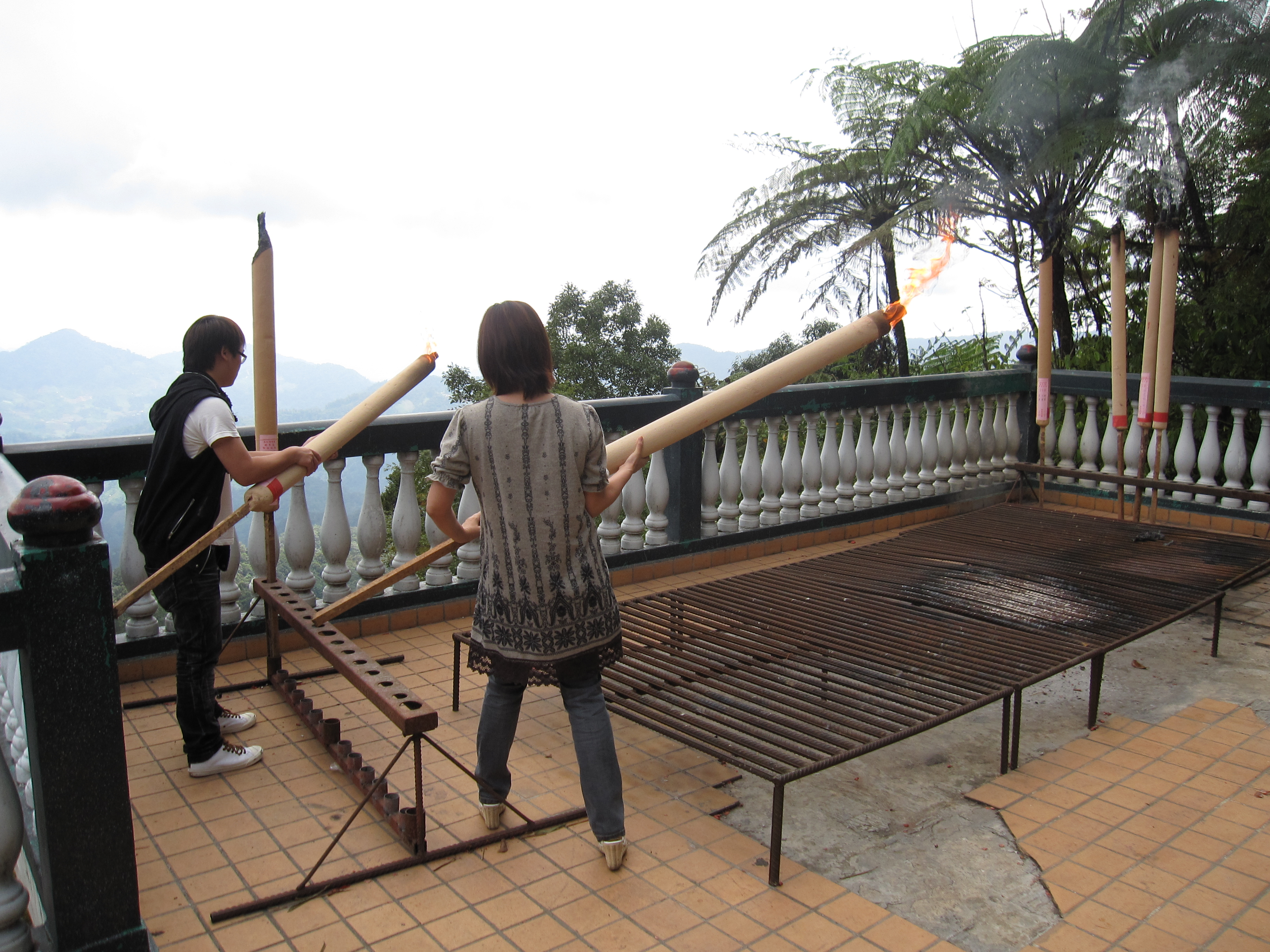
Giant incense.

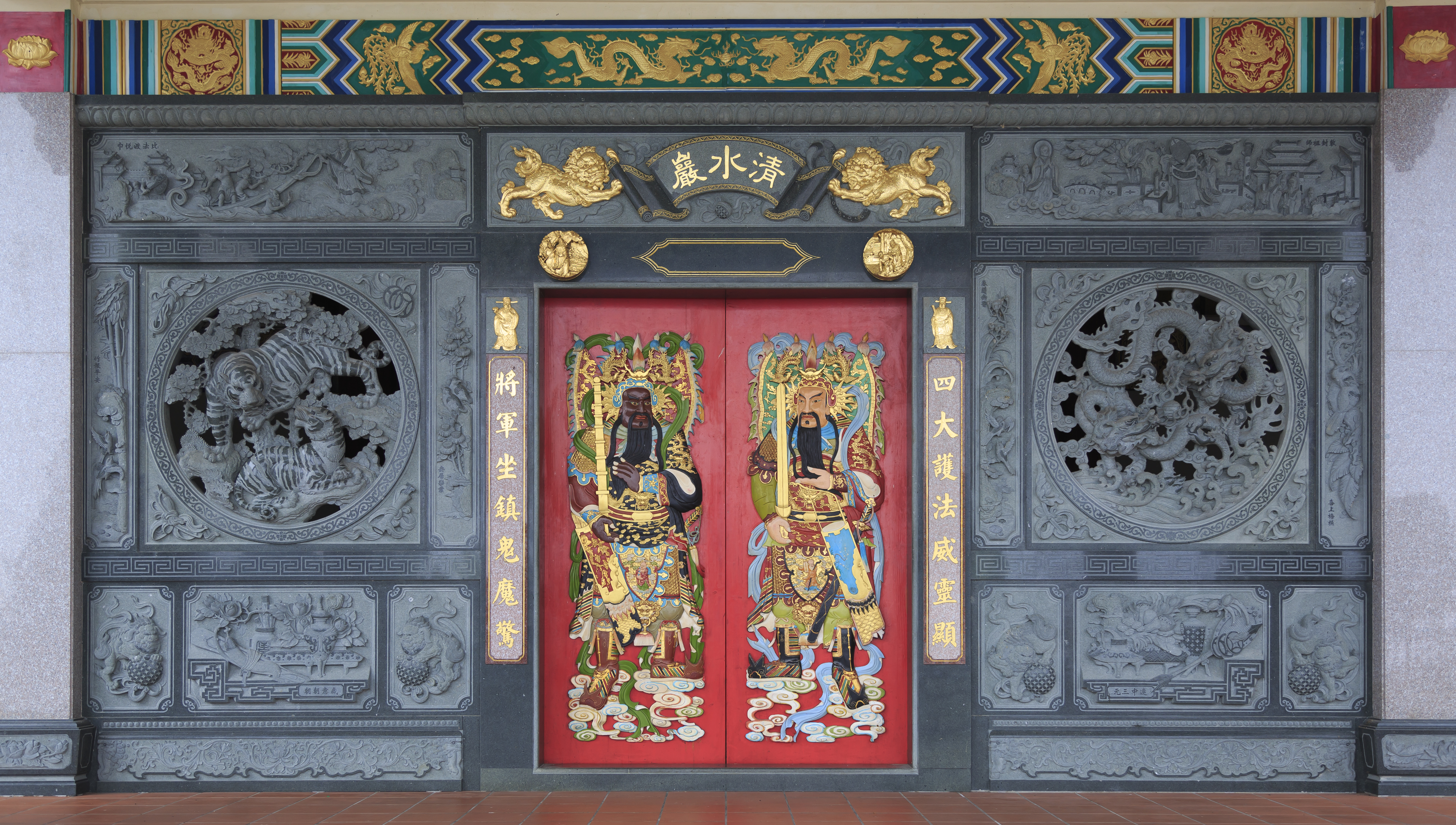
Handcrafted door.

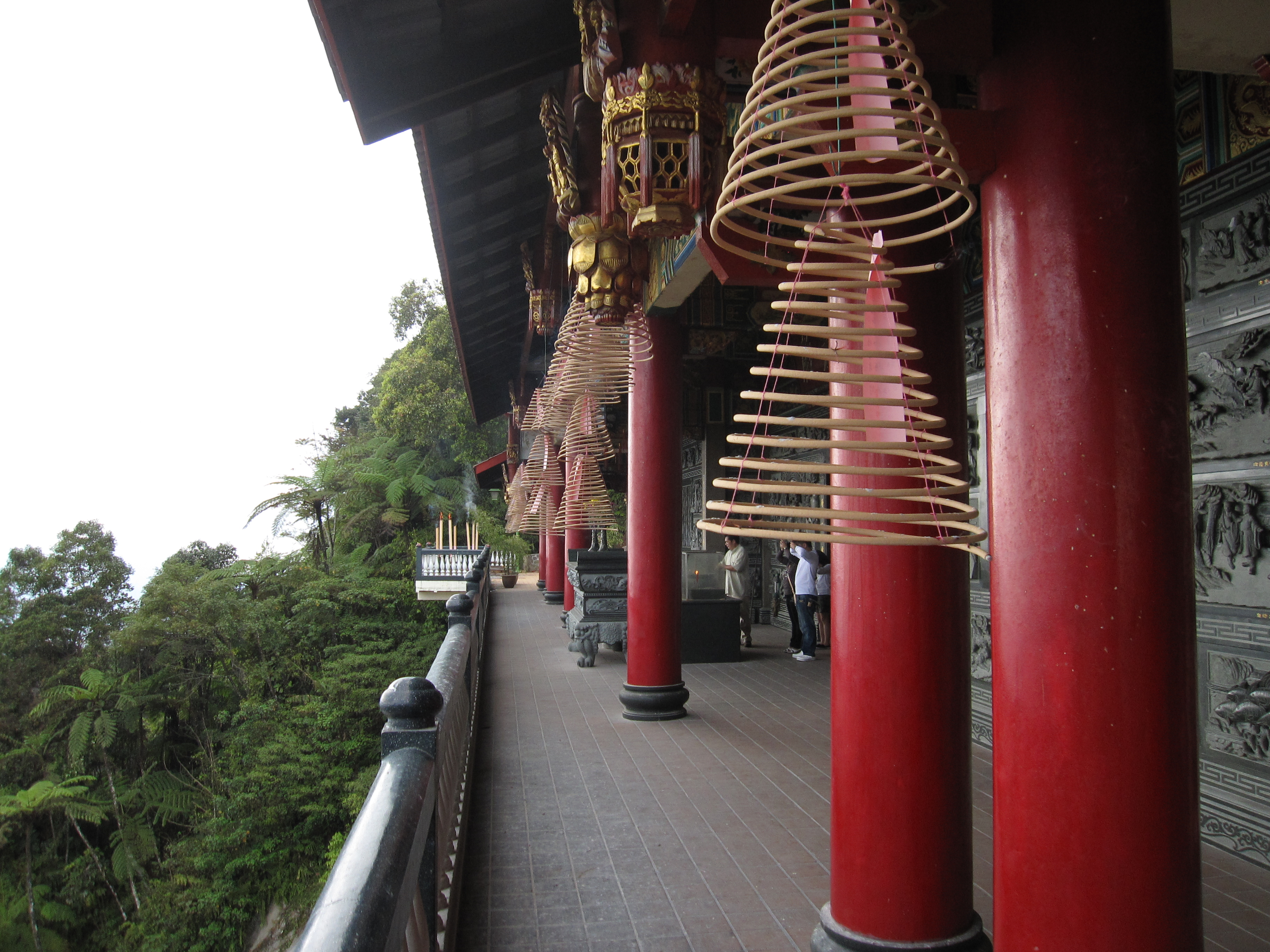
Red pillar of the temple.

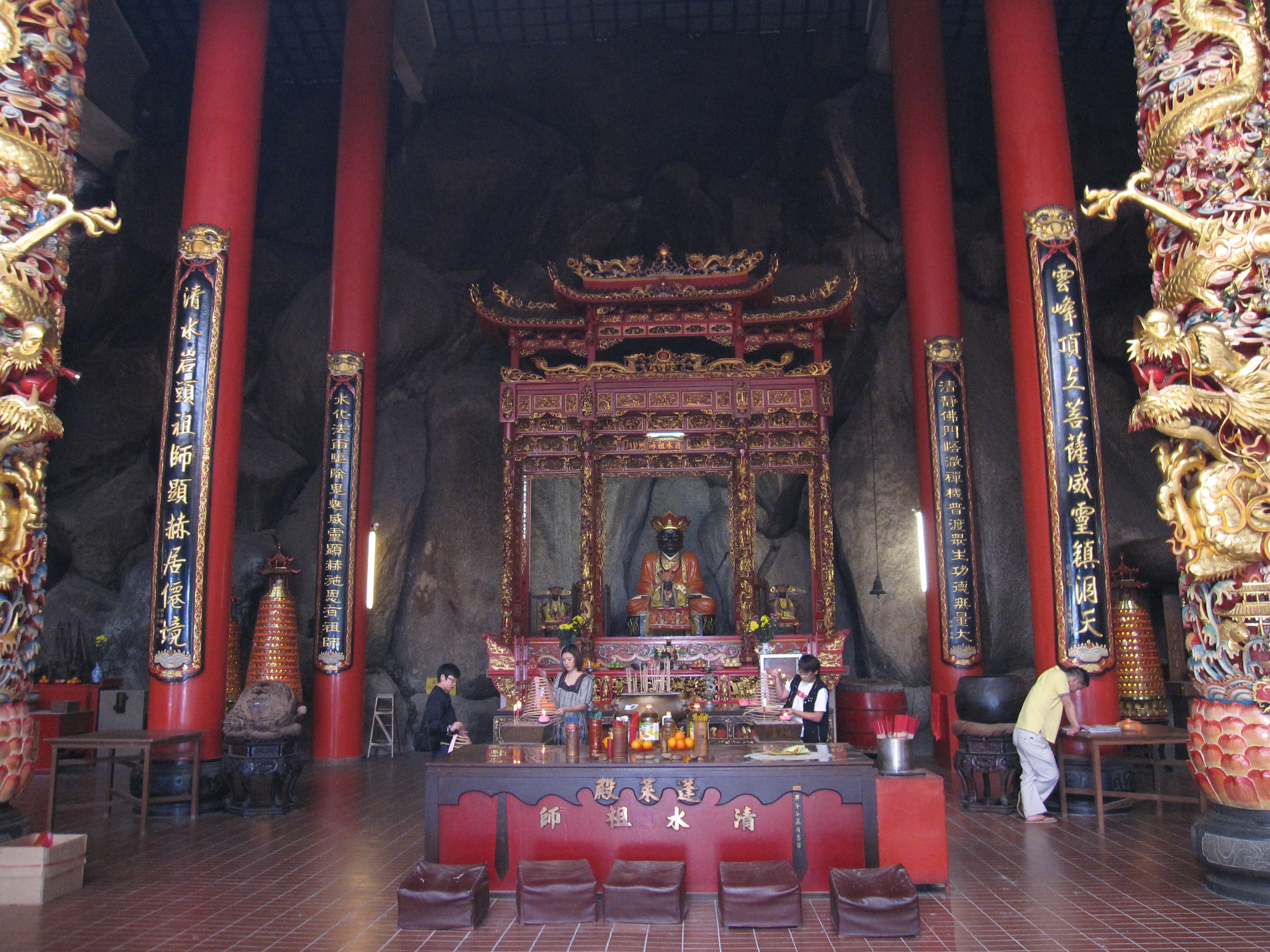
The temple prayer hall.

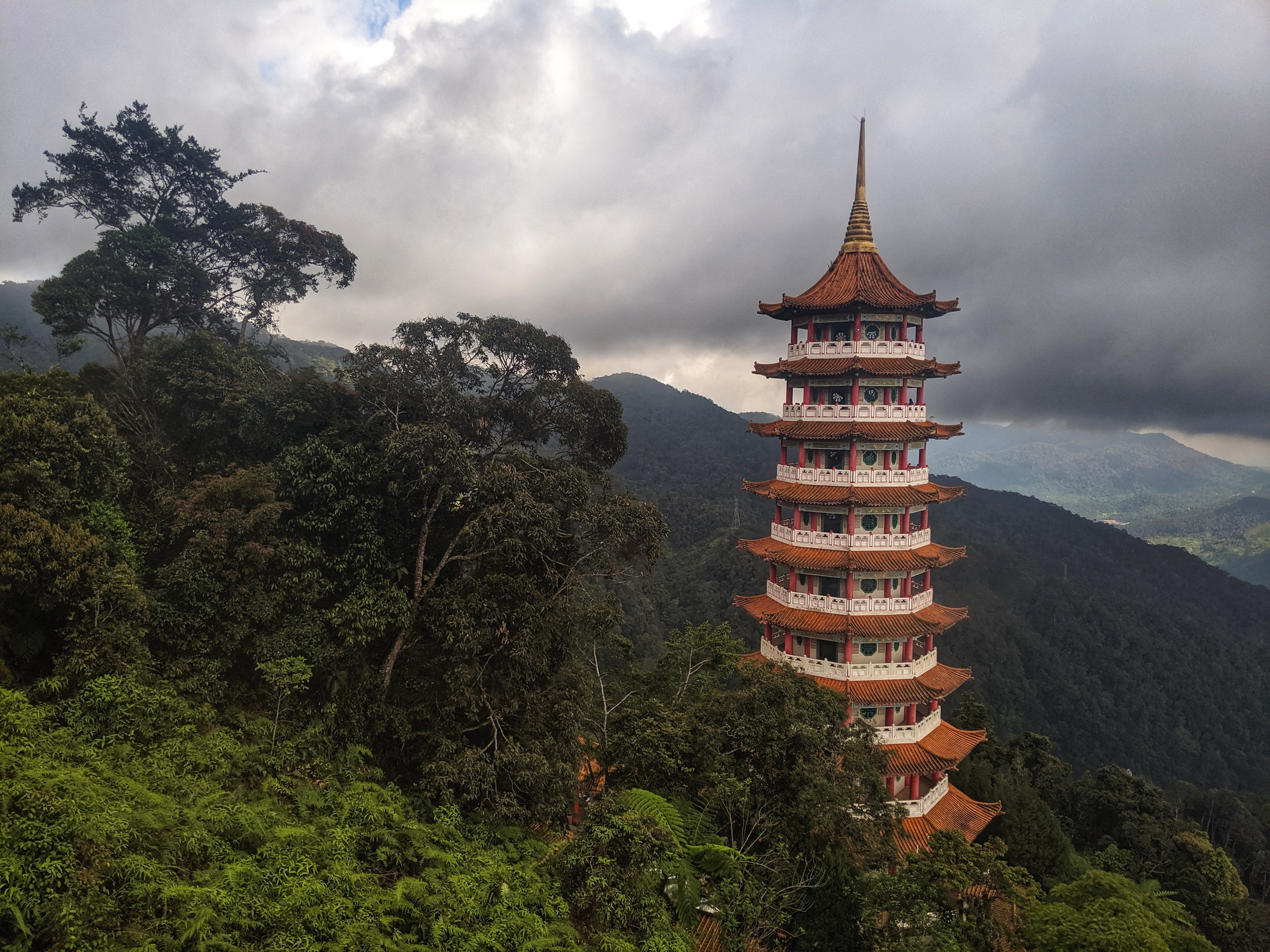
The temple's pagoda

== See also ==
- Awana Skyway
- Qingshui Temple: (艋舺清水巖), Wanhua, Taipei, Taiwan
- Zushi Temple: (三峽長福巖), New Taipei, Taiwan
- Qing Shui Temple: (清水宮), Zuoying, Kaohsiung, Taiwan
- Snake Temple: Penang, Malaysia
- Fushan Temple: (福山寺), Yangon, Myanmar
