= Genting Skyway =

Gondola lift serving Genting Highlands, Malaysia

Coordinates: 3°24′30″N 101°45′53″E

Genting SkyWay 云顶缆车
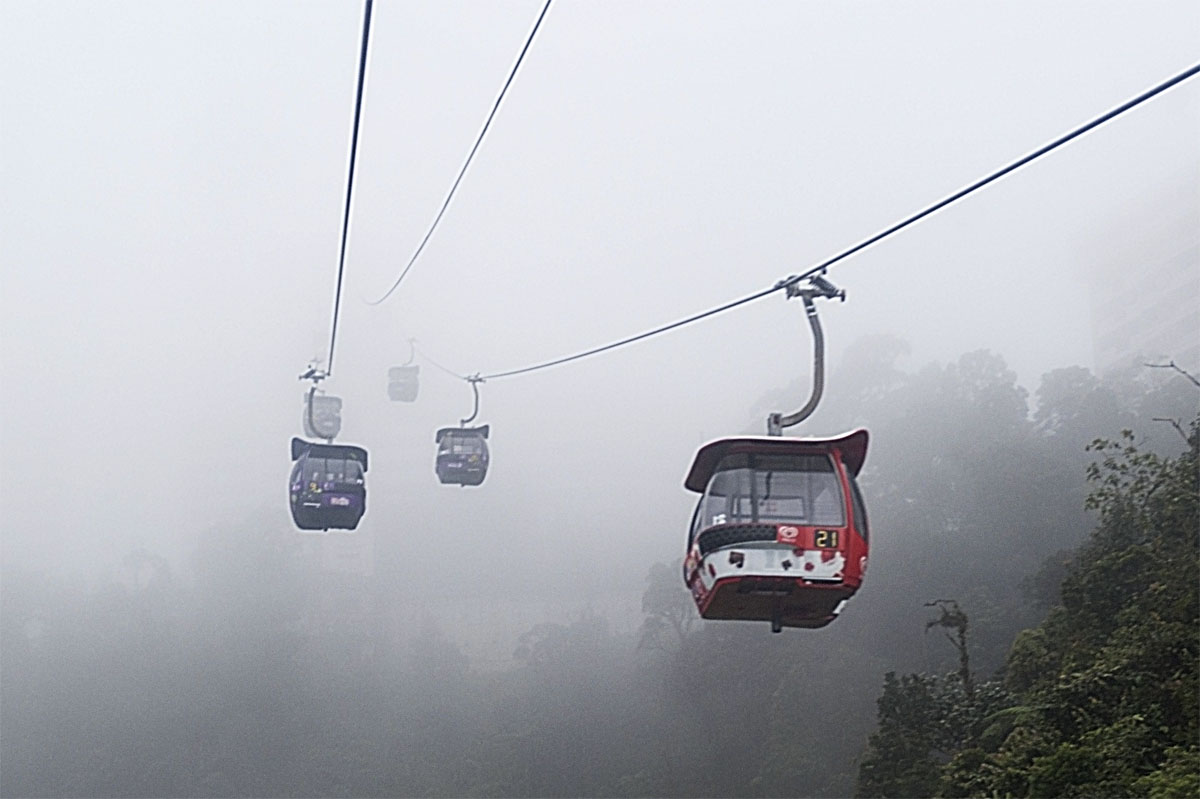
- Cabin view from the upper section of the line
- Interactive map of Genting SkyWay 云顶缆车

Overview
- Status: Operational
- System: Detachable monocable gondola lift (GD8)
- Location: Genting Highlands, Pahang and Gohtong Jaya, Selangor, Malaysia
- Termini: Gohtong Sentral Station; Resorts World Station
- No. of stations: 2
- Open: 1 February 1997; 29 years ago (public service); 21 February 1997; 29 years ago (official opening)

Operation
- Carrier capacity: 8 passengers per gondola; 3,000 passengers per hour in each direction
- Trip duration: Approximately 15 minutes

Technical features
- Aerial lift type: Cable car
- Line length: 3,380 m (11,090 ft)
- Operating speed: 6 m/s (22 km/h; 13 mph)

Genting SkyWay is a gondola lift serving Genting Highlands in Malaysia. The 3.4-kilometre (2.1 mi) line connects Gohtong Sentral Station at Gohtong Jaya, Selangor, with Resorts World Station at the hilltop resort in Pahang.

The line opened to the public on 1 February 1997 and was officially opened by the fourth Prime Minister of Malaysia, Mahathir Mohamad, on 21 February 1997. Genting SkyWay is one of two gondola systems serving Resorts World Genting, alongside the newer Awana SkyWay.

As of 2026, Genting SkyWay operates daily from 9:00 a.m. to 7:00 p.m., while operating hours may be extended when it serves as the principal alternative during maintenance of the Awana SkyWay.

== Route and operations ==
Genting SkyWay runs directly between Gohtong Sentral Station and Resorts World Station without an intermediate passenger stop. The journey covers an inclined length of 3,380 metres (11,090 ft) and normally takes around 15 minutes. The line has 22 support towers, with the tallest reaching 51 metres (167 ft).

Each standard 8-passenger gondola (GD8) operates on a continuous circulating loop. Resorts World Genting states that the system has a current carrying capacity of 3,000 passengers per hour in each direction and a maximum operating speed of 6 metres per second (22 km/h; 13 mph).

The lower terminus, Gohtong Sentral Station, is located in Gohtong Jaya. The upper terminus, currently referred to by Resorts World Genting as Resorts World Station, provides access to the hilltop resort. The original upper station was constructed as part of the then-Highlands Hotel (now RW Hotel) complex, although the cable-car structure was designed to be structurally independent from the hotel building.

== Engineering and construction ==
Genting SkyWay was developed for Resorts World Bhd. The ropeway system was designed and manufactured by Leitner S.p.A. of Italy as an 8-passenger detachable monocable gondola lift (type GD8), while Arup Jururunding Sdn Bhd was responsible for the civil, structural, geotechnical, mechanical and electrical engineering works. CWW Architects Sdn Bhd served as the architect.

Arup's project record lists the project cost as RM128 million and a completion date of 1996. The system was designed with an inclined length of 3,383 metres (11,099 ft) and a maximum rope speed of 6 metres per second (22 km/h; 13 mph). Contemporary reports stated that the system was completed shortly before passenger service began in February 1997.

The original engineering specification gave the system a capacity of 2,400 passengers per hour in each direction and an end-to-end travel time of approximately 11 minutes. This differs from the current operational figures published by Resorts World Genting, which state a capacity of 3,000 passengers per hour in each direction and a typical journey time of approximately 15 minutes.

The Gohtong Jaya station complex was designed as a five-storey reinforced-concrete station structure with an adjoining ten-storey car park. A central reinforced-concrete core was incorporated to resist lateral forces generated by the cable-car system.

At the hilltop, the station was functionally integrated into the Highlands Hotel complex but structurally separated from the main hotel through expansion joints, preventing the dynamic forces generated by the ropeway from being transferred to the hotel structure.

The route is supported by 22 pylons. Each pylon was founded on four 1.2-metre (3.9 ft) diameter caissons socketed into granite bedrock. Construction also included extensive slope-stabilisation works and protection against boulder strikes because of the steep and mountainous terrain.

A flyover carrying the cable-car alignment across the existing Batang Kali–Genting road was also constructed. It consists of two 28-metre (92 ft) spans using precast, pretensioned M-beams.

== History ==
=== Opening ===
Genting SkyWay opened to passengers on 1 February 1997. The official opening ceremony was held on 21 February 1997 and was officiated by Prime Minister Mahathir Mohamad.

At the time of its opening, contemporary reports described Genting SkyWay as the longest cable-car system in Southeast Asia and as one of the world's fastest monocable gondola systems, with a maximum speed of 6 metres per second (22 km/h; 13 mph). Arup's contemporary project summary similarly described it as the world's fastest monocable cable-car ride at the time.

During the double festive period in February 1997, around 40,000 to 50,000 passengers used the system. Rides were initially free until 31 March 1997, after which a one-way fare of RM2 was introduced.

=== Proposed extension ===
In early 1997, a second phase was proposed that would have extended the system from Gohtong Jaya towards Batang Kali. Contemporary reports envisaged linking the proposed extension with wider transport connections towards Kuala Lumpur, Kuala Lumpur International Airport and Port Klang. The extension was not subsequently constructed.

=== Relationship with Awana SkyWay ===
A new Awana SkyWay gondola system opened in 2016 and became the principal cable-car connection between the mid-hill area and Resorts World Genting. Genting SkyWay subsequently served principally during peak periods and as an alternative when Awana SkyWay was unavailable.

Genting Malaysia's 2024 annual report stated that Genting SkyWay operated only during peak periods, with Awana SkyWay and Genting SkyWay together carrying more than 6.1 million passengers to Resorts World Genting's hilltop hotels and attractions during 2024.

This operating pattern changed in 2026. On 1 May 2026, Resorts World Genting announced that both Awana SkyWay and Genting SkyWay were in operation, with Genting SkyWay operating from 9:00 a.m. to 7:00 p.m. daily. The resort's current Genting SkyWay webpage likewise lists daily operating hours of 9:00 a.m. to 7:00 p.m.

The two systems also provide operational redundancy during scheduled maintenance. For example, during the scheduled closure of Awana SkyWay from 12 to 16 October 2026, Resorts World Genting announced that Genting SkyWay would operate from 7:00 a.m. to 11:00 p.m. to support passenger movements.

== Gallery ==
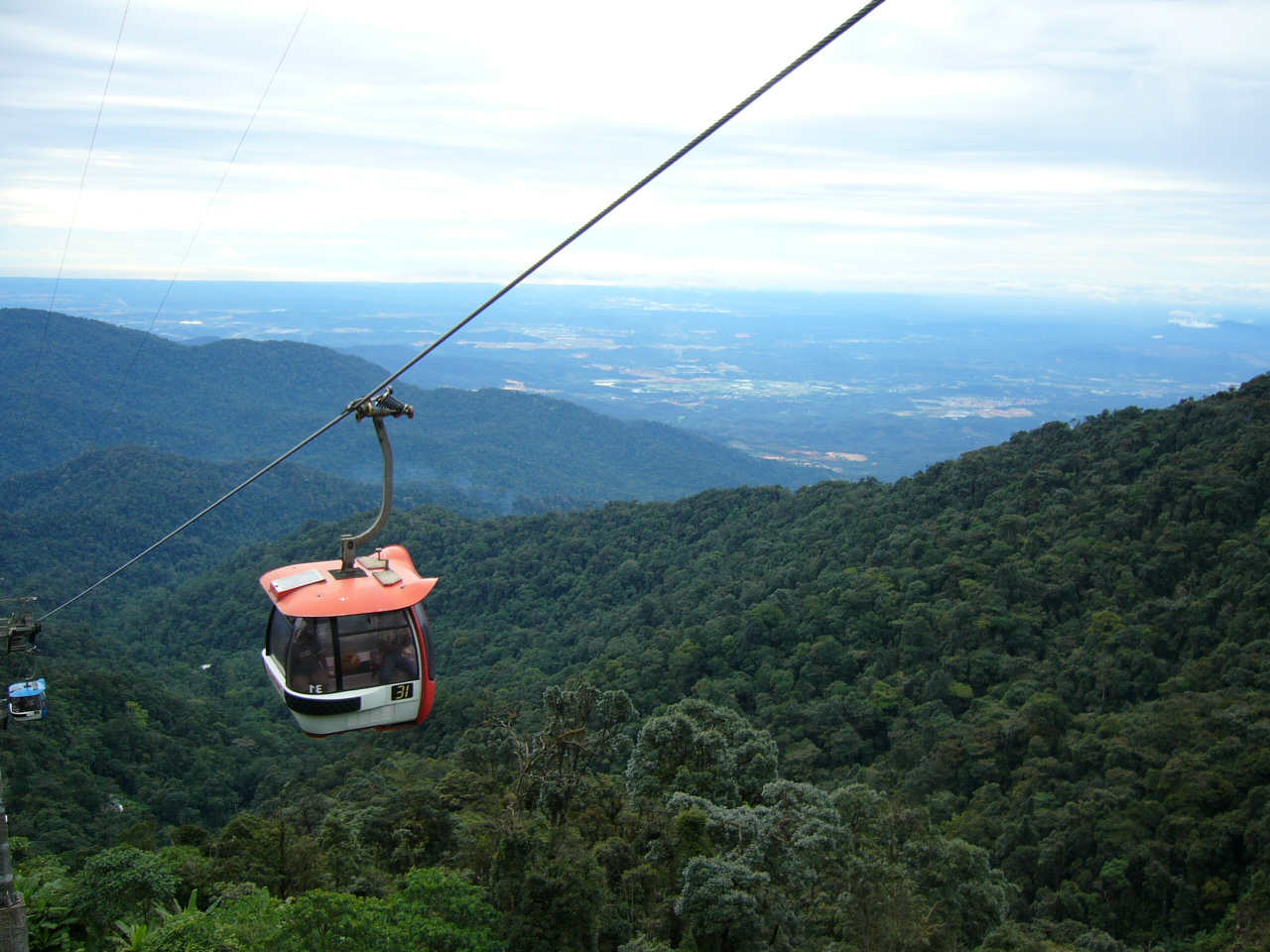
Cabin view from the lower section

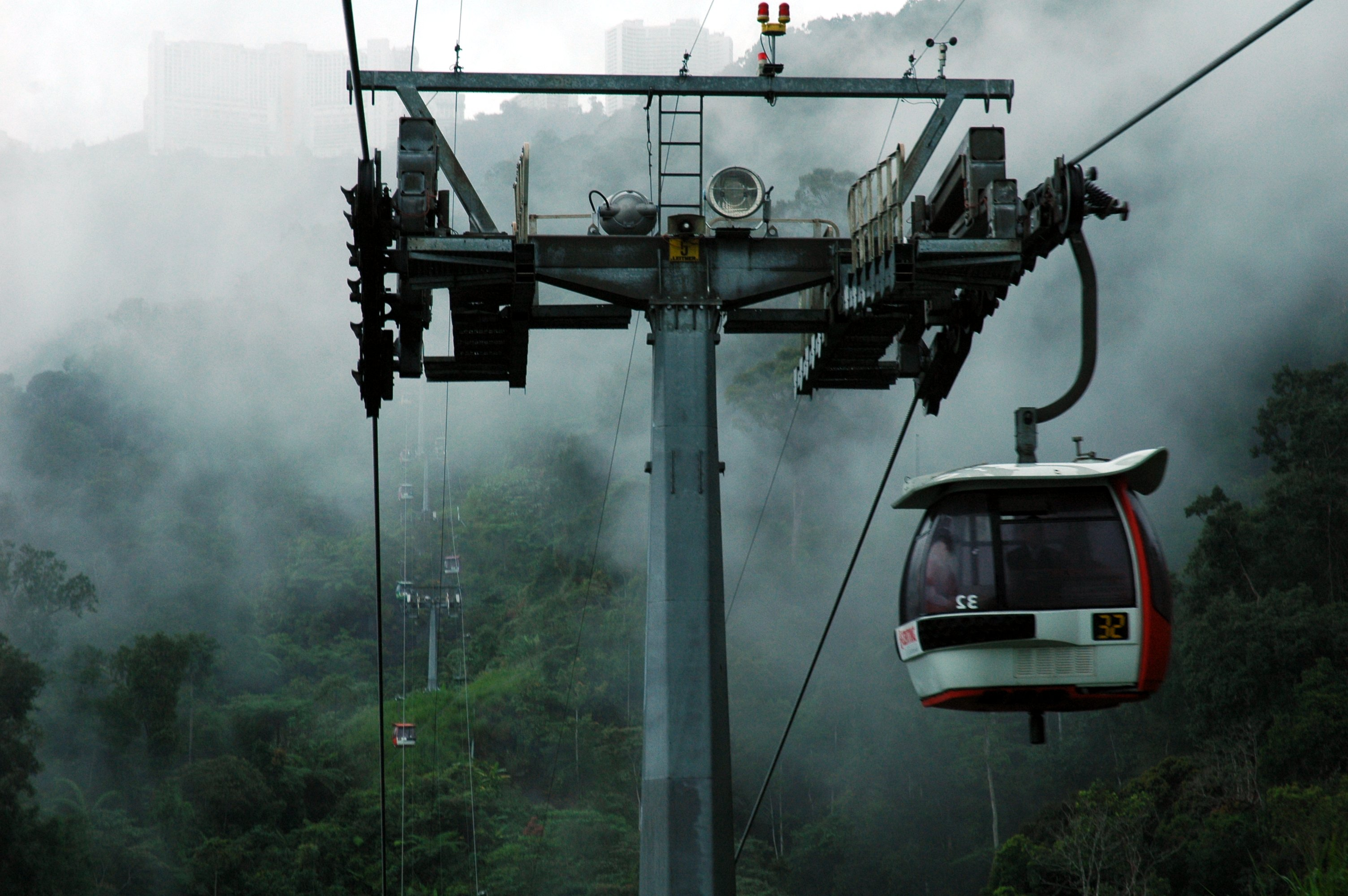
View from a gondola near the upper section

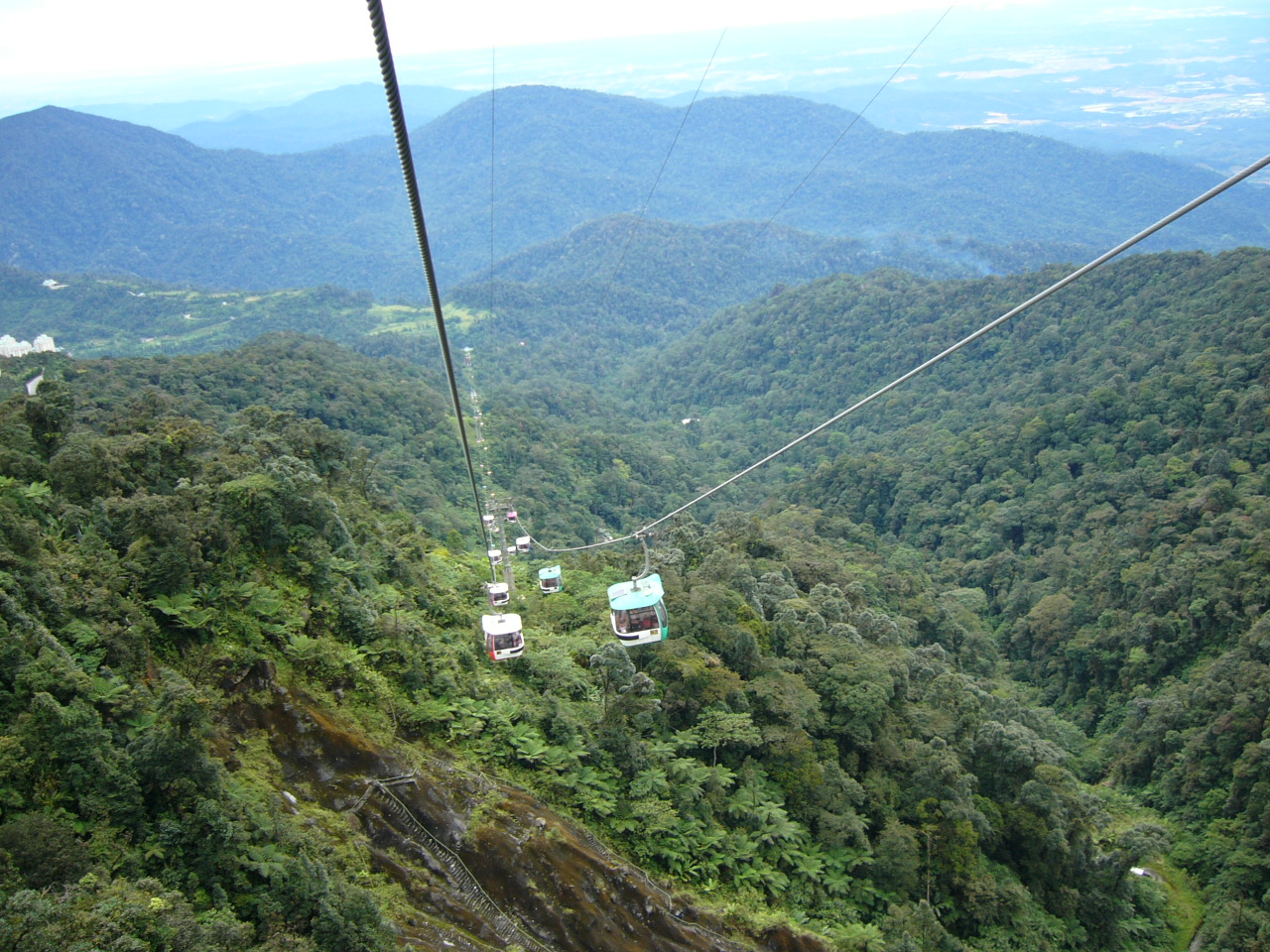
Cabin view from the lower section

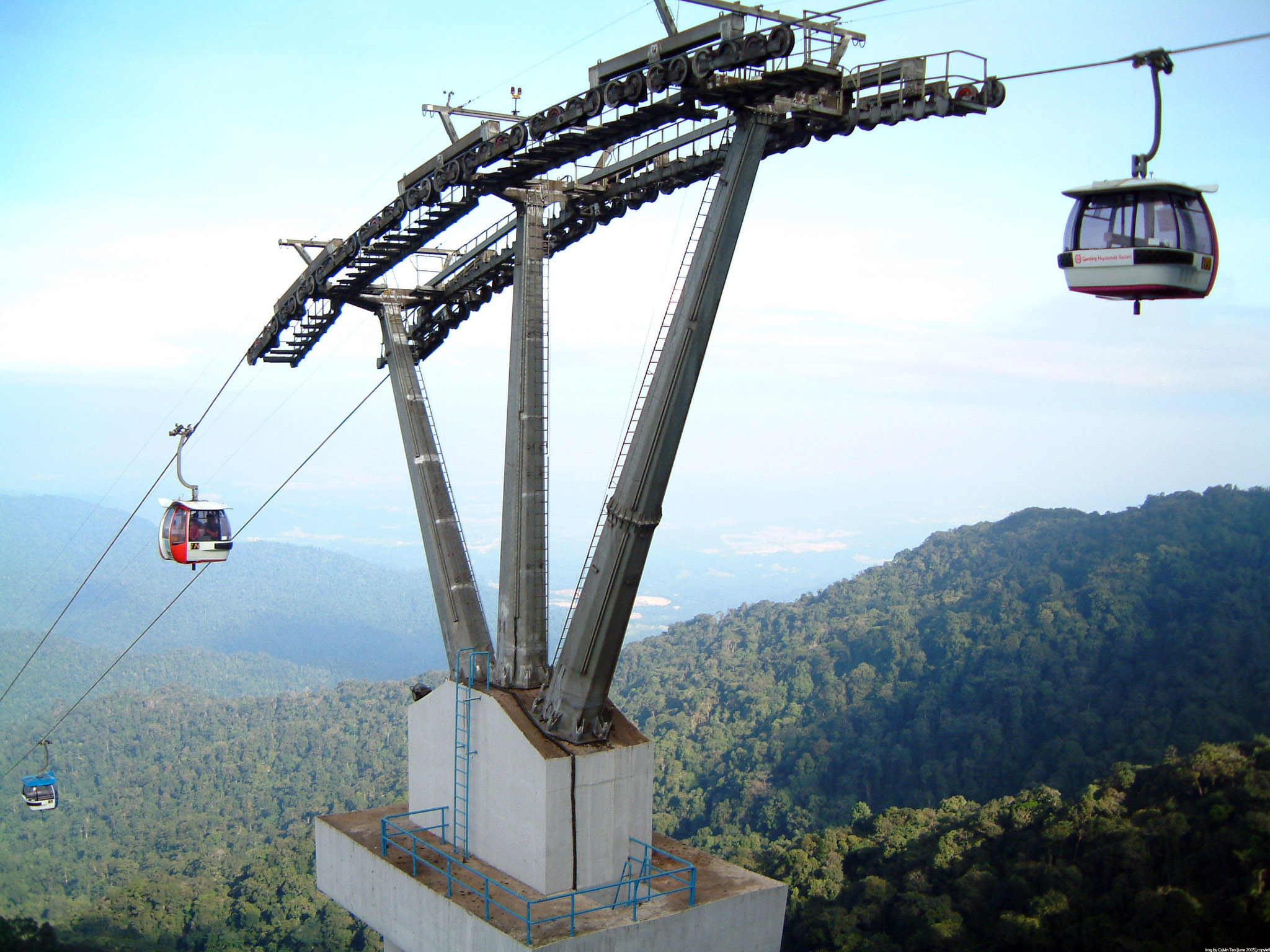
A support tower on the route

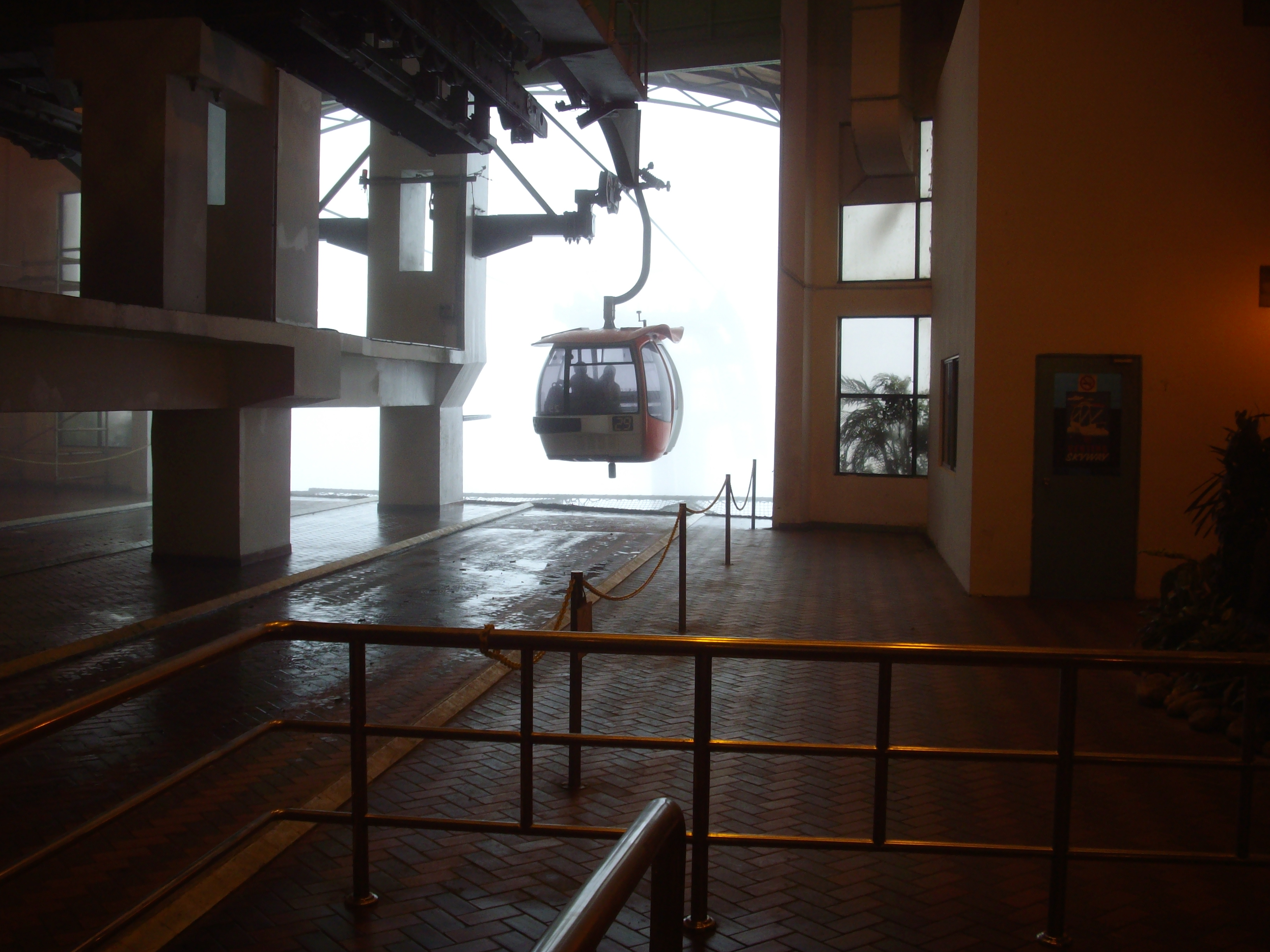
A gondola arriving at the hilltop station

Resorts World Station

== See also ==
- Awana SkyWay
- Langkawi Cable Car
- Penang Hill Railway
