= Genting Highlands =

Hill station and resort area in Pahang and Selangor, Malaysia

Genting Highlands Tanah Tinggi Genting
- Hill station and resort
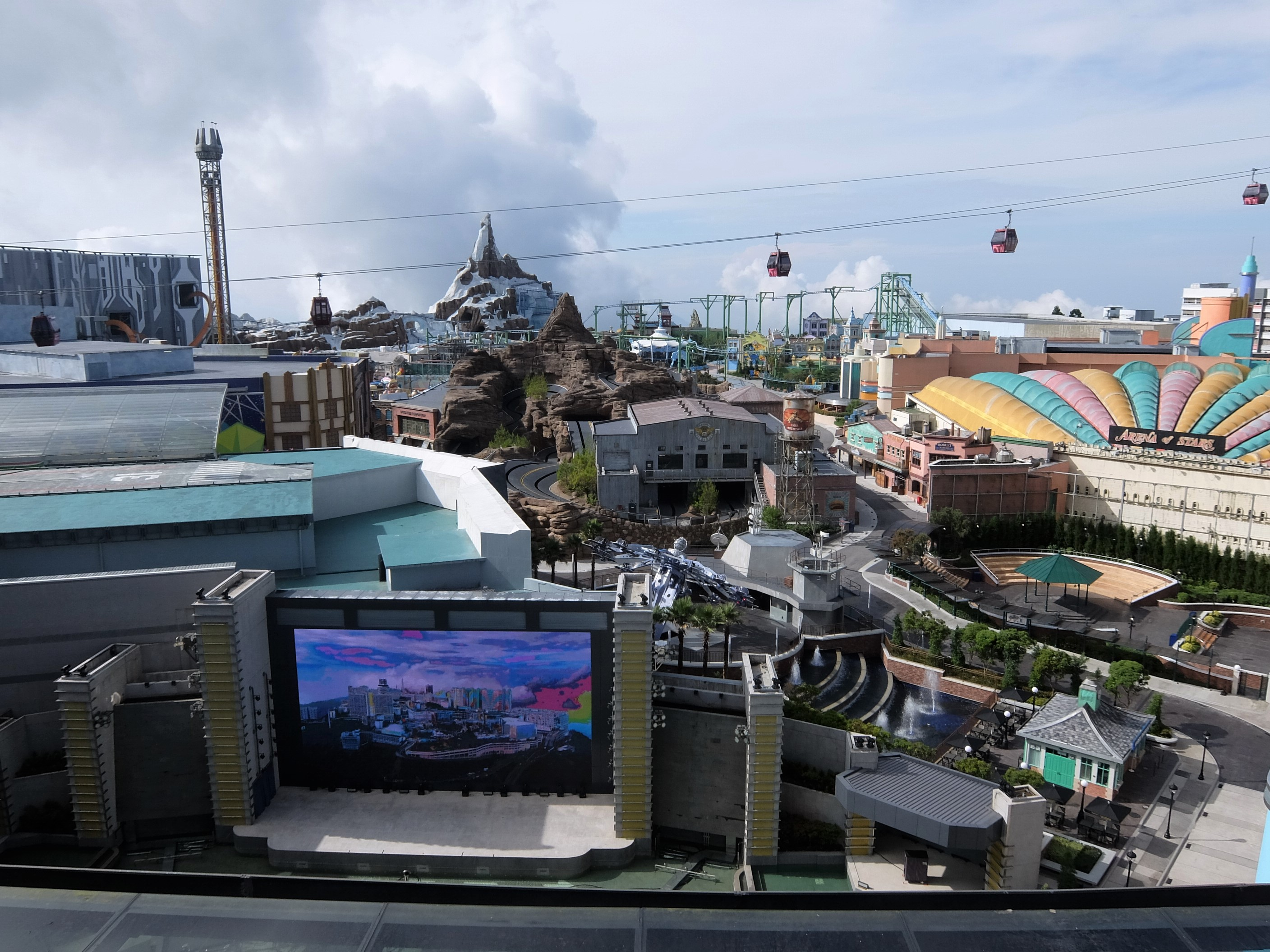
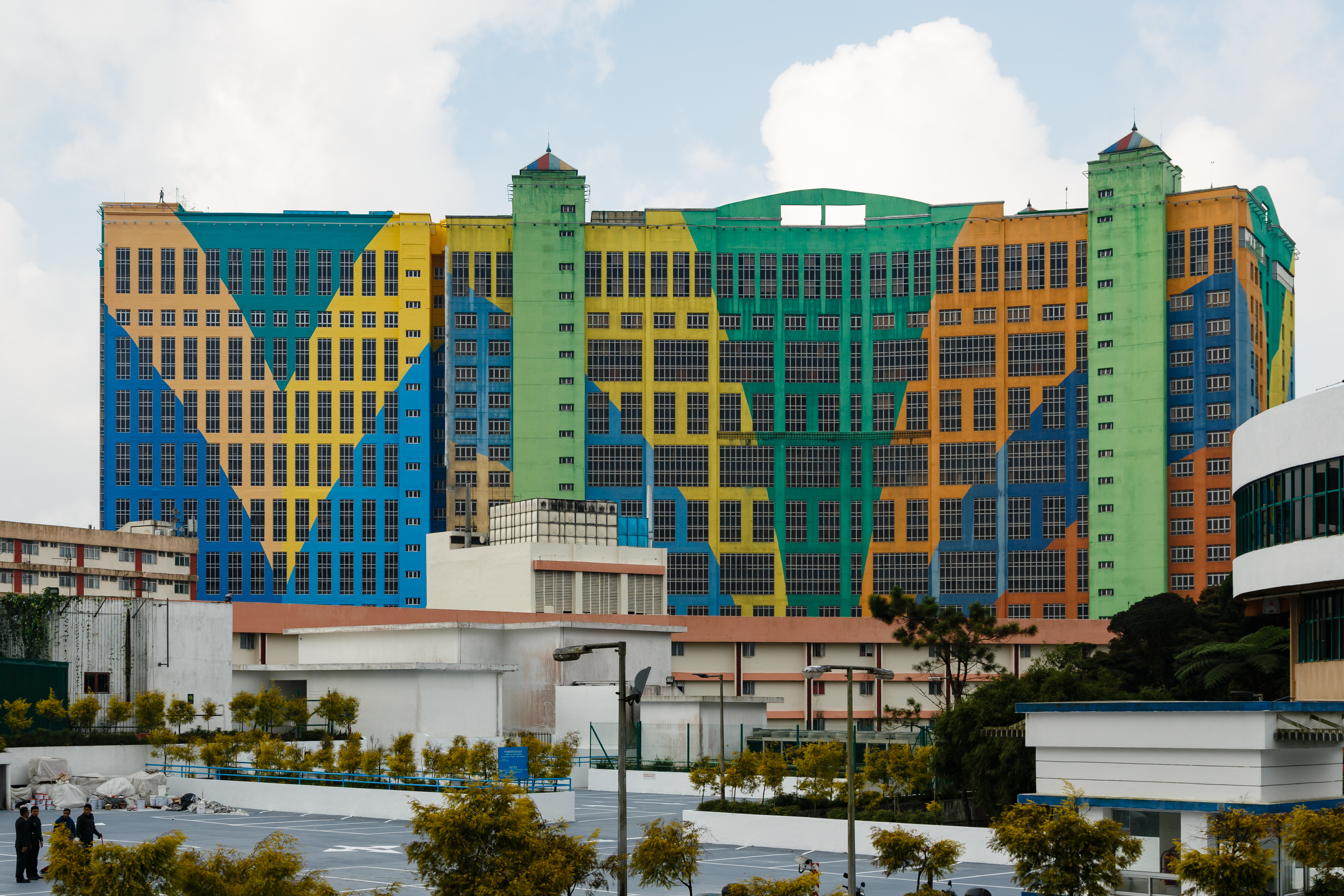
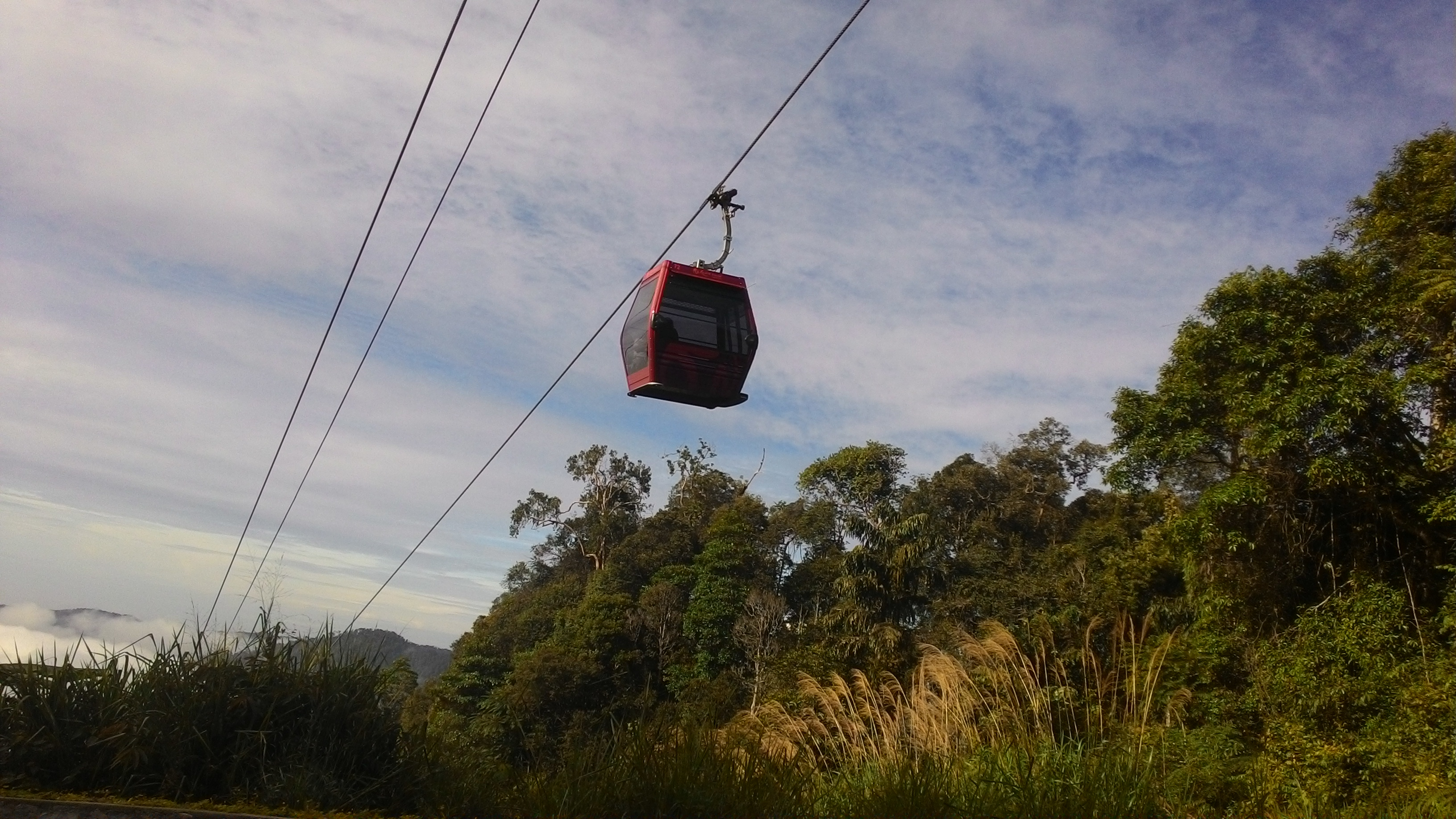
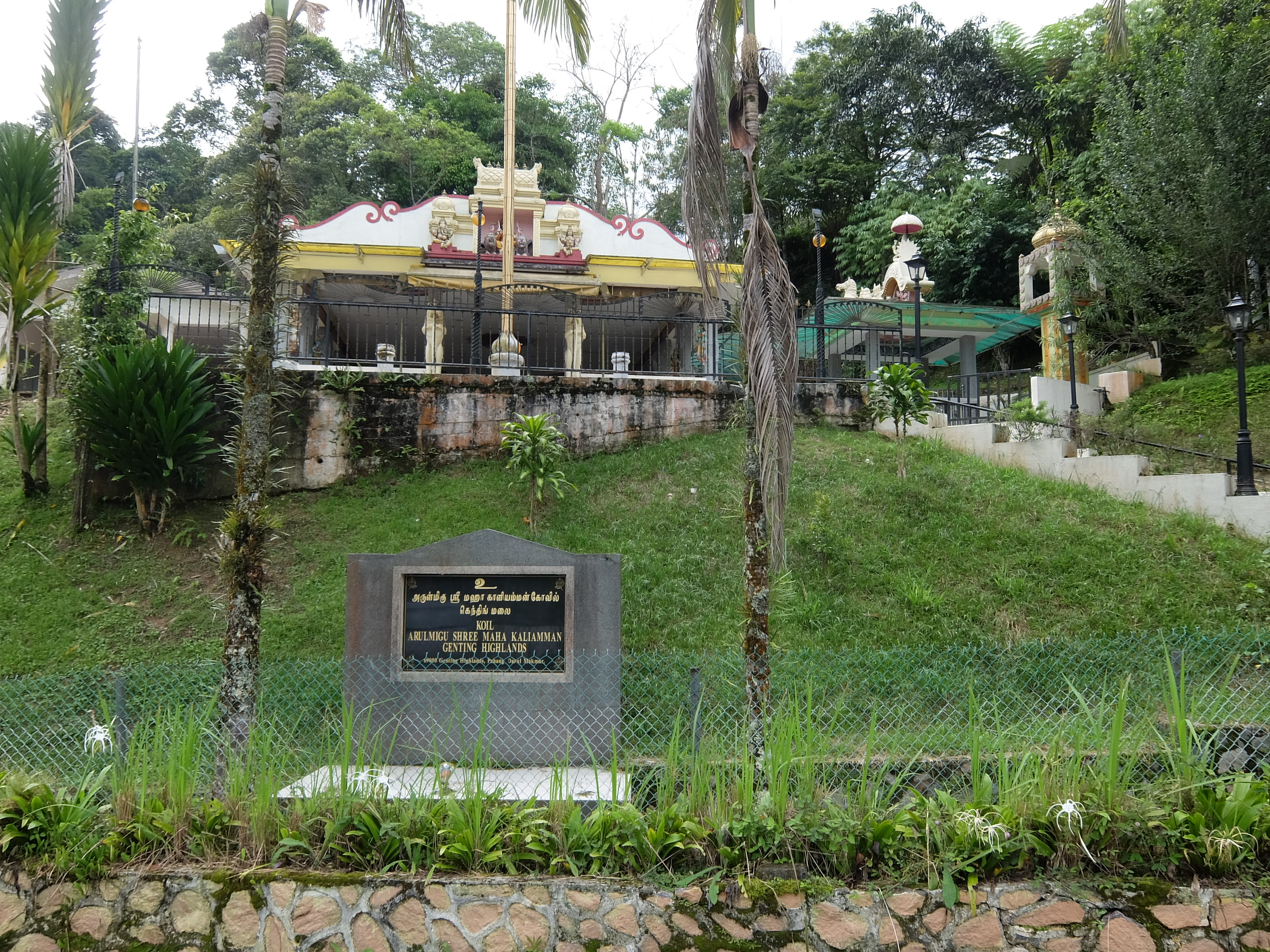
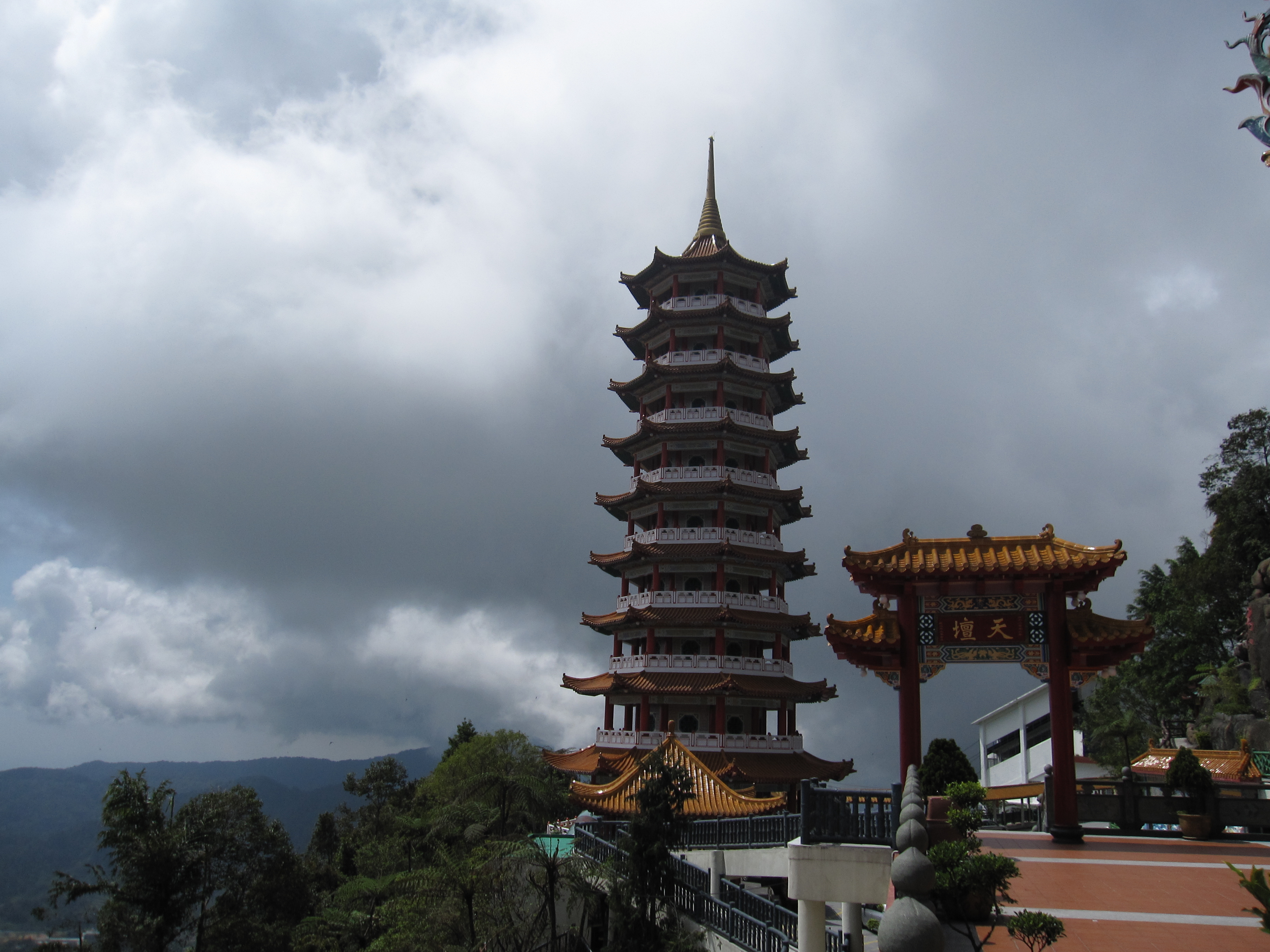
- Genting SkyWorlds First World Hotel Awana SkyWay Arulmigu Shree Maha Kaliamman Temple Chin Swee Caves Temple

- Location near the Pahang–Selangor boundary Location near the Pahang–Selangor boundary Location in Peninsular Malaysia Location in Malaysia
- Coordinates: 3°25′25″N 101°47′36″E
- Country: Malaysia
- States: Pahang; Selangor
- Districts: Bentong; Hulu Selangor
- Local authorities: Bentong Municipal Council; Hulu Selangor Municipal Council
- Founded: 27 April 1965
- Founder: Lim Goh Tong
- Elevation: 1,800 m (5,900 ft)
- Time zone: UTC+8 (MST)
- Postcode: 69000

Genting Highlands is a hill station and integrated resort development situated on the peak of Mount Ulu Kali in the Titiwangsa Mountains of Peninsular Malaysia. Located at an elevation of approximately 1,800 metres (5,900 ft) above sea level, the resort area straddles the boundary between Pahang and Selangor, with administrative jurisdictions divided between Bentong District on the eastern side and Hulu Selangor District on the western flank.

Established in 1965 by Malaysian entrepreneur Lim Goh Tong, Genting Highlands is one of Malaysia's primary tourist destinations, situated roughly an hour's drive from Kuala Lumpur. Its central attraction is Resorts World Genting (RWG), an integrated leisure resort operated by Genting Malaysia Berhad that features seven hotels, Malaysia's sole legal land-based casinos, indoor and outdoor theme parks, convention complexes, and extensive shopping and dining facilities. While the resort predominantly uses a Pahang postal address, several key facilities, including RW Hotel and the Genting SkyWay base station, are located on the Selangor side of the state border.

== History ==
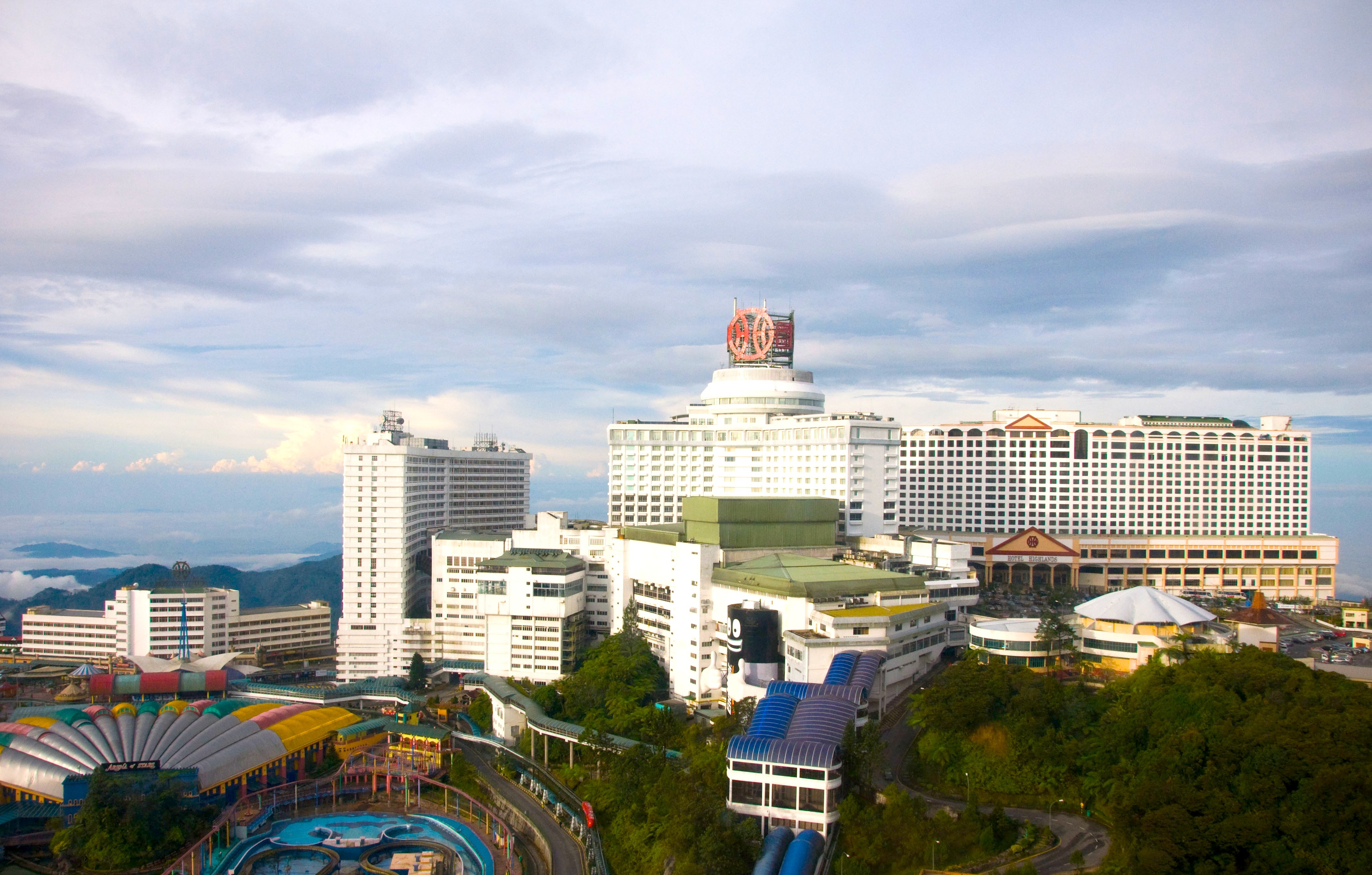
Resorts World Genting in 2008

The concept of establishing a mountain resort within close proximity to Kuala Lumpur was conceived in 1963 by contractor Lim Goh Tong while working on a hydroelectric scheme in the Cameron Highlands. Inspired by the cooler climate, Lim noted that the existing hill stations were distant from the federal capital. Following an assessment of regional topographical maps, he identified Mount Ulu Kali at Genting Sempah, situated 58 km from Kuala Lumpur, as an optimal site.

On 27 April 1965, Lim co-founded Genting Highlands Berhad alongside prominent politician Mohamad Noah Omar. Between 1965 and 1970, the company secured approvals for the alienation of 12,000 acres (4,900 ha) of state land from Pahang and 2,800 acres (1,100 ha) from Selangor. Construction of a privately funded 25.5-kilometre (15.8 mi) access road from Genting Sempah to the summit commenced in August 1965 and was completed in 1969.

On 31 March 1969, Prime Minister Tunku Abdul Rahman laid the foundation stone for the resort's pioneer hotel, Highlands Hotel (later renamed Theme Park Hotel and currently Genting SkyWorlds Hotel). During this event, the federal government granted the resort an exclusive casino licence to promote tourism. Genting Highlands Resort officially opened to the public in 1971.

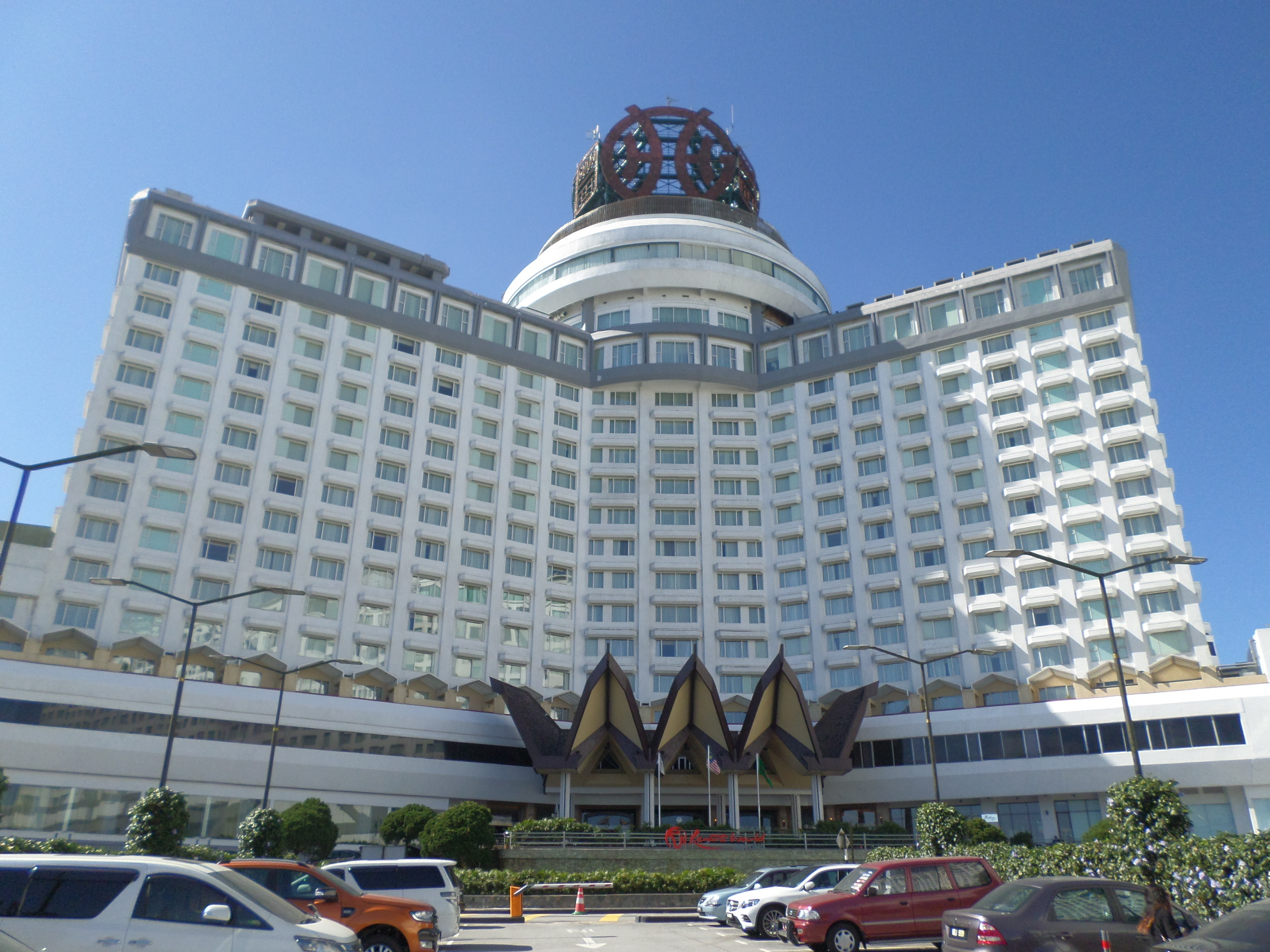
Genting Grand Hotel, showing its signature rooftop logo

The resort expanded continuously through subsequent decades. The original Awana Skyway aerial tramway opened in 1975, followed by the Genting Hotel (now Genting Grand) in 1981, Awana Genting Highlands Golf & Country Resort (now Resorts World Awana) in 1985, and Resort Hotel in 1992. The Genting Outdoor Theme Park opened in 1994, accompanied by the completion of Chin Swee Caves Temple. In 1997, the Genting SkyWay gondola lift and the second Highlands Hotel (later renamed Maxims, and currently RW Hotel) were introduced.

In 2001, the first tower of First World Hotel and the adjoining First World Plaza indoor theme park commenced operations. By 2015, the addition of Tower 2A expanded First World Hotel to 7,351 rooms, securing the Guinness World Records title as the largest hotel in the world by room count.

In 2013, Genting Malaysia launched the Genting Integrated Tourism Plan (GITP), a multi-billion-ringgit master redevelopment programme. This phase delivered the mid-hill Sky Sentral transport exchange, the new Awana SkyWay gondola system, the SkyAvenue lifestyle mall, Crockfords luxury hotel, and the Genting Highlands Premium Outlets in 2016–2017. The indoor amusement park was completely revamped and reopened as Skytropolis Indoor Theme Park in 2018. Following a restructuring of licensing agreements with The Walt Disney Company and 20th Century Studios, the outdoor theme park was redesigned and opened as Genting SkyWorlds on 8 February 2022.

== Geography and administration ==
Genting Highlands is situated on the summit plateau and surrounding ridges of Mount Ulu Kali within the central spine of the Titiwangsa Mountains. Topographically, the resort rises from around 1,000 metres (3,300 ft) at the mid-hill town of Gohtong Jaya to approximately 1,800 metres (5,900 ft) at the peak complex.

The resort plateau lies directly across the state boundary dividing Pahang from Selangor. On the Pahang side, the state government formally gazetted the area as the Genting Autonomous Subdistrict (Daerah Kecil Genting) in November 2019, encompassing 6,668.63 hectares (16,478.5 acres) within Mukim Bentong, under the municipal governance of the Bentong Municipal Council.

The western slopes fall within Mukim Batang Kali in Hulu Selangor District and are administered by the Hulu Selangor Municipal Council. Development, zoning, and environmental preservation on the Selangor side are guided by the statutory Genting Highlands Hulu Selangor Special Area Plan (RKK Genting Highlands Hulu Selangor), prepared jointly by PLANMalaysia and the municipal authority.

== Climate ==
Genting Highlands features a spring-like subtropical highland climate (Köppen: Cfb), characterised by cool temperatures and frequent mountain mists. Diurnal temperatures typically range between 14 °C (57 °F) and 22 °C (72 °F), rarely exceeding 25 °C (77 °F) or dropping below 10 °C (50 °F).

Climate data for Genting Highlands
Month	Jan	Feb	Mar	Apr	May	Jun	Jul	Aug	Sep	Oct	Nov	Dec	Year
Mean daily maximum °C (°F)	20.3 (68.5)	21.1 (70.0)	22.0 (71.6)	22.3 (72.1)	22.3 (72.1)	22.1 (71.8)	21.7 (71.1)	21.5 (70.7)	21.4 (70.5)	21.2 (70.2)	21.0 (69.8)	20.5 (68.9)	21.5 (70.6)
Daily mean °C (°F)	16.0 (60.8)	16.5 (61.7)	17.1 (62.8)	17.7 (63.9)	17.8 (64.0)	17.6 (63.7)	17.1 (62.8)	17.0 (62.6)	17.0 (62.6)	17.0 (62.6)	16.9 (62.4)	16.4 (61.5)	17.0 (62.6)
Mean daily minimum °C (°F)	11.8 (53.2)	12.0 (53.6)	12.3 (54.1)	13.1 (55.6)	13.3 (55.9)	13.1 (55.6)	12.5 (54.5)	12.6 (54.7)	12.7 (54.9)	12.9 (55.2)	12.8 (55.0)	12.3 (54.1)	12.6 (54.7)
Average precipitation mm (inches)	250 (9.8)	165 (6.5)	232 (9.1)	259 (10.2)	203 (8.0)	112 (4.4)	103 (4.1)	120 (4.7)	173 (6.8)	258 (10.2)	310 (12.2)	278 (10.9)	2,463 (96.9)
Source: Climate data.org

== Resorts World Genting ==
Resorts World Genting
- Interactive map of Resorts World Genting
- Location: Resorts World Genting, 69000 Genting Highlands, Bentong, Pahang, Malaysia
- Opened: 27 April 1965; 61 years ago
- No. of rooms: 10,466 (7 hotels)
- Gaming space: Over 200,000 sq ft (19,000 m^{2})
- Signature attractions: First World Plaza; SkyAvenue; Skytropolis Indoor Theme Park; Genting SkyWorlds; Genting Premium Outlets
- Notable restaurants: The Laughing Fish by Harry Ramsden; Burger & Lobster; Cafés Richard; Coffee Terrace; La Fiesta e18hteen LTITUDE; Malaysian Food Street; Motorino; The Olive
- Owner: Genting Group (Genting Malaysia Berhad)
- Renovated in: Genting Integrated Tourism Plan (2013–2021)
- Website: www.rwgenting.com

Resorts World Genting (Abbreviation: RWG), originally known as Genting Highlands Resort, is an integrated hill resort comprises hotels, gaming floors, theme parks and retail districts. The properties are interconnected by a network of indoor pedestrian walkways. Property directories indicate direct access routes linking SkyAvenue, First World Hotel and Plaza, Crockfords, the Genting Grand Complex, various entertainment venues, the theme parks, and the cable car stations.

=== Hotels ===
Resorts World Genting operates seven major hotel properties comprising over 10,000 guest rooms.

Hotel	Opened	Class	Rooms	Notes
Genting SkyWorlds Hotel	1971	3-star	448	The resort's original pioneer hotel, formerly known as Highlands Hotel and later Theme Park Hotel. It sits adjacent to the outdoor theme park entrance. The hotel's Valley Wings section is connected to the main section via a walk bridge.
Genting Grand	1981	5-star	422	Known for its Y-shaped tower and prominent rooftop "Genting" logo. It houses the Genting Casino gaming floor and VIP salons.
Resorts World Awana	1985	4-star	413	Located in the mid-hill region, featuring an 18-hole championship golf course, eco-trekking facilities, and heated pools.
Highlands Hotel	1992	3-star	900	Originally constructed as Resort Hotel, this tower directly faces the outdoor theme park. It assumed the Highlands Hotel name in 2026.
RW Hotel	1997	5-star	753	Built as the second Highlands Hotel and later known as Maxims, this 28-storey tower houses the upper terminus of the Genting SkyWay. It was rebranded as RW Hotel in May 2026 as the resort's premier luxury flagship. It is situated on the Selangor side of the boundary.
First World Hotel	2001	3-star	7,351	Comprising three colourful towers, it is officially certified by Guinness World Records as the largest hotel in the world by room count.
Crockfords	2017	5-star	138	High-end luxury suites integrated within the upper levels of SkyAvenue. It has consistently retained a 5-star rating from Forbes Travel Guide.

=== Theme parks ===
- Genting SkyWorlds: A 26-acre (11 ha) outdoor theme park featuring nine uniquely themed lands, including Studio Plaza, Eagle Mountain, Central Park, Rio, Andromeda Base, Liberty Lane, Epic, Robots Rivet Town, and Ice Age, incorporating intellectual properties licensed from 20th Century Studios.
- Skytropolis Indoor Theme Park: Spanning 400,000 square feet (37,000 m^{2}) within First World Plaza, this multi-level indoor amusement centre features over 20 mechanical rides, family attractions, and virtual reality centres.
- Vision City Video Game Park: An expansive family amusement arcade located beneath the Genting Grand Complex.

=== Casinos ===
Resorts World Genting operates the only legalised land-based casinos in Malaysia. The primary gaming complex is SkyCasino, an expansive multi-level gaming venue situated within SkyAvenue. The historic Genting Casino, located in the Genting Grand Complex, underwent extensive refurbishments in 2024 to upgrade its gaming salons and VIP facilities.

=== Shopping and entertainment ===
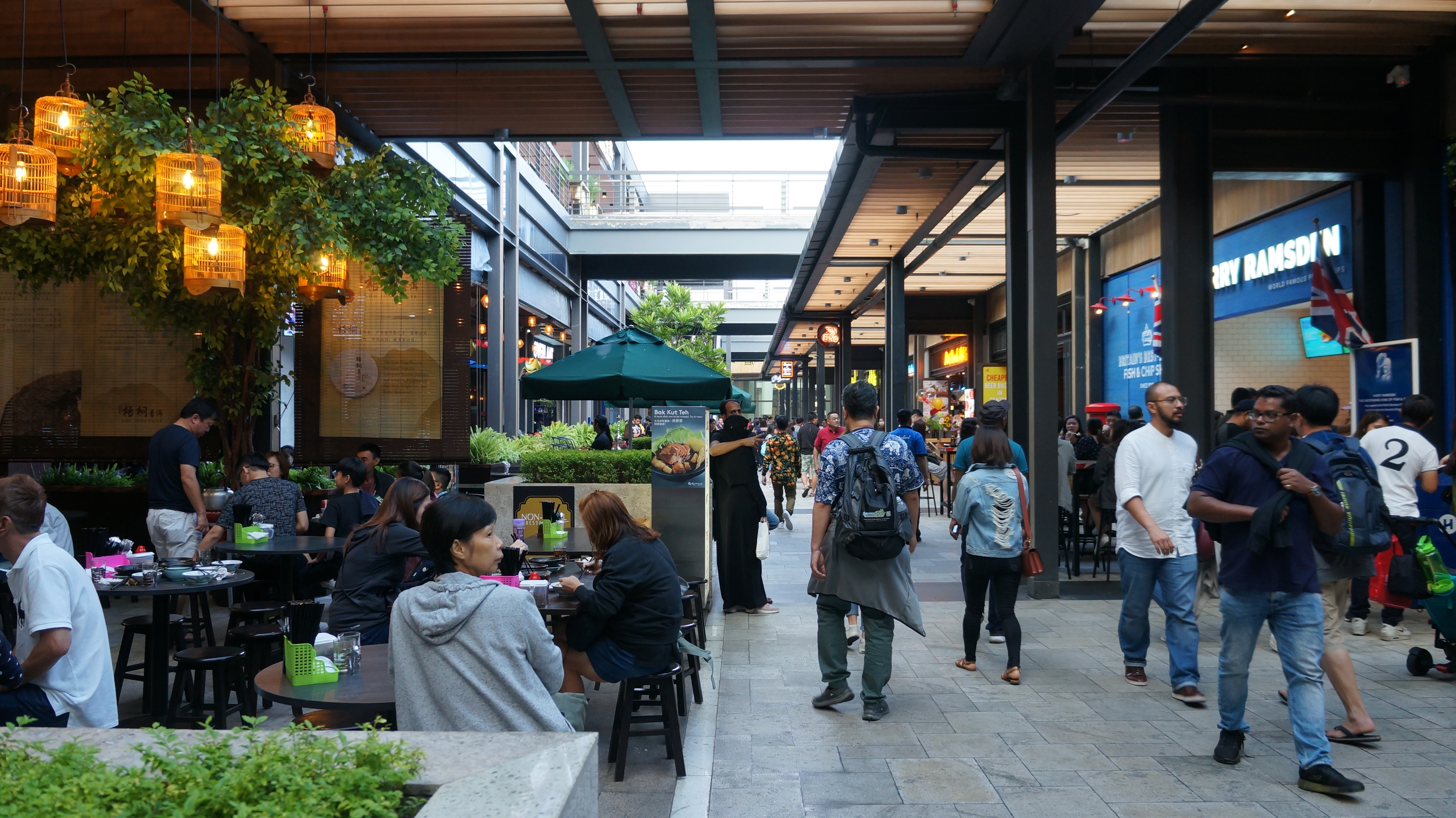
High Line Roof Top Market at SkyAvenue

The resort features five major retail destinations:

- SkyAvenue: The flagship lifestyle mall at the summit, integrating major dining streets, luxury boutiques, and the High Line Roof Top Market.
- First World Plaza: A multi-level shopping and entertainment complex that houses Skytropolis and indoor dining avenues.
- Genting Grand Complex: Retail concourse adjoining Genting Grand and the original casino floor.
- Genting Highlands Premium Outlets (GHPO): An open-air designer outlet shopping centre situated at the mid-hill, featuring over 150 designer stores and international brands.
- Sky Sentral: Mid-hill transport retail hub where the cable car terminal is located and is connected to GHPO by pedestrian bridges.

Major live performance facilities include the 5,132-seat Arena of Stars concert arena and the 1,000-seat multimedia Genting International Showroom. Cineplex facilities are provided by Bona Cinemas at SkyAvenue, featuring IMAX and Dolby Atmos auditoriums. Nightlife and dance clubs include Zouk Genting, which comprises the Empire dance club, RedTail gaming bar, and specialised dining concepts.

=== Other attractions ===
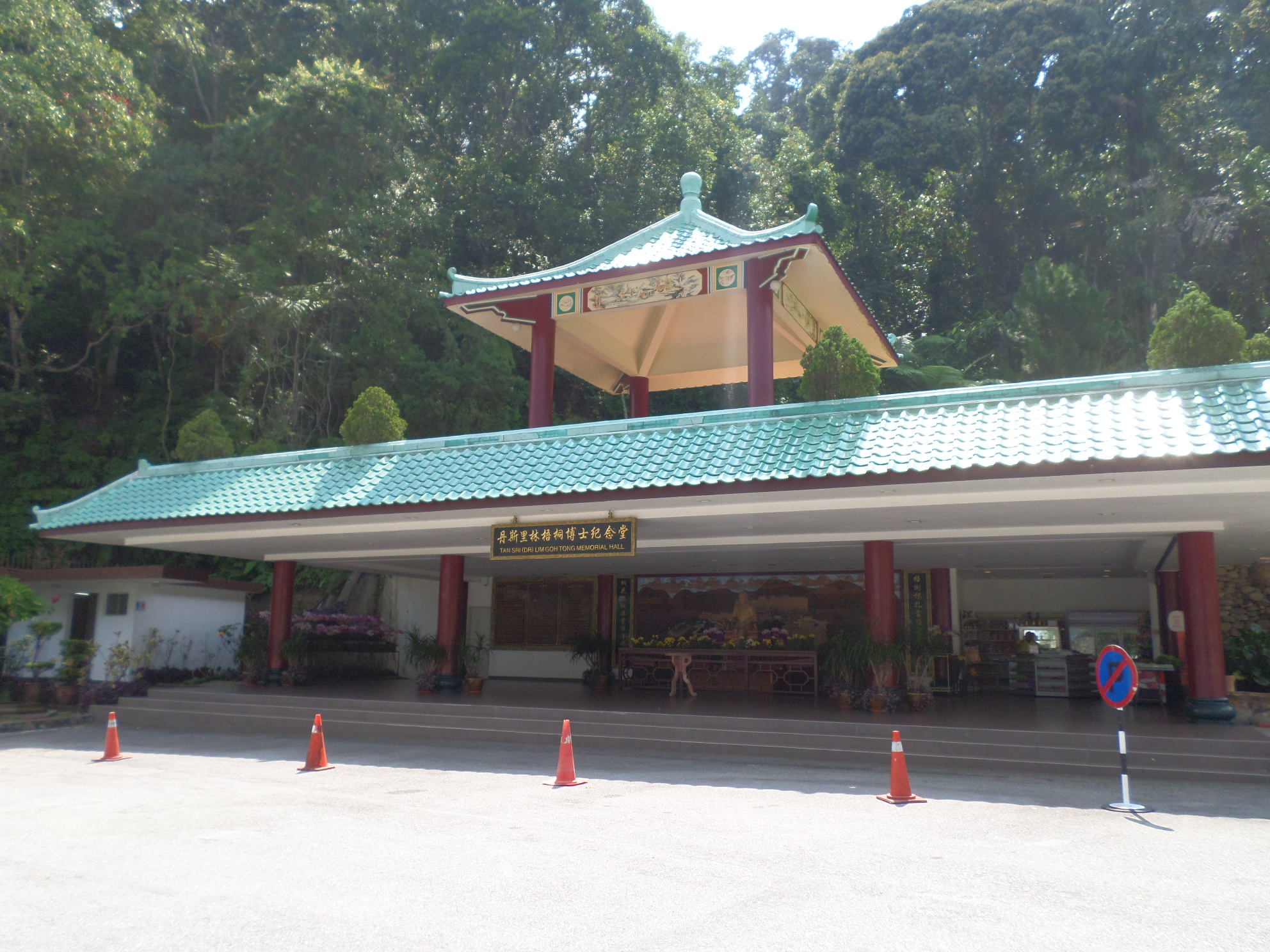
Tan Sri (Dr) Lim Goh Tong Memorial Hall in Gohtong Jaya

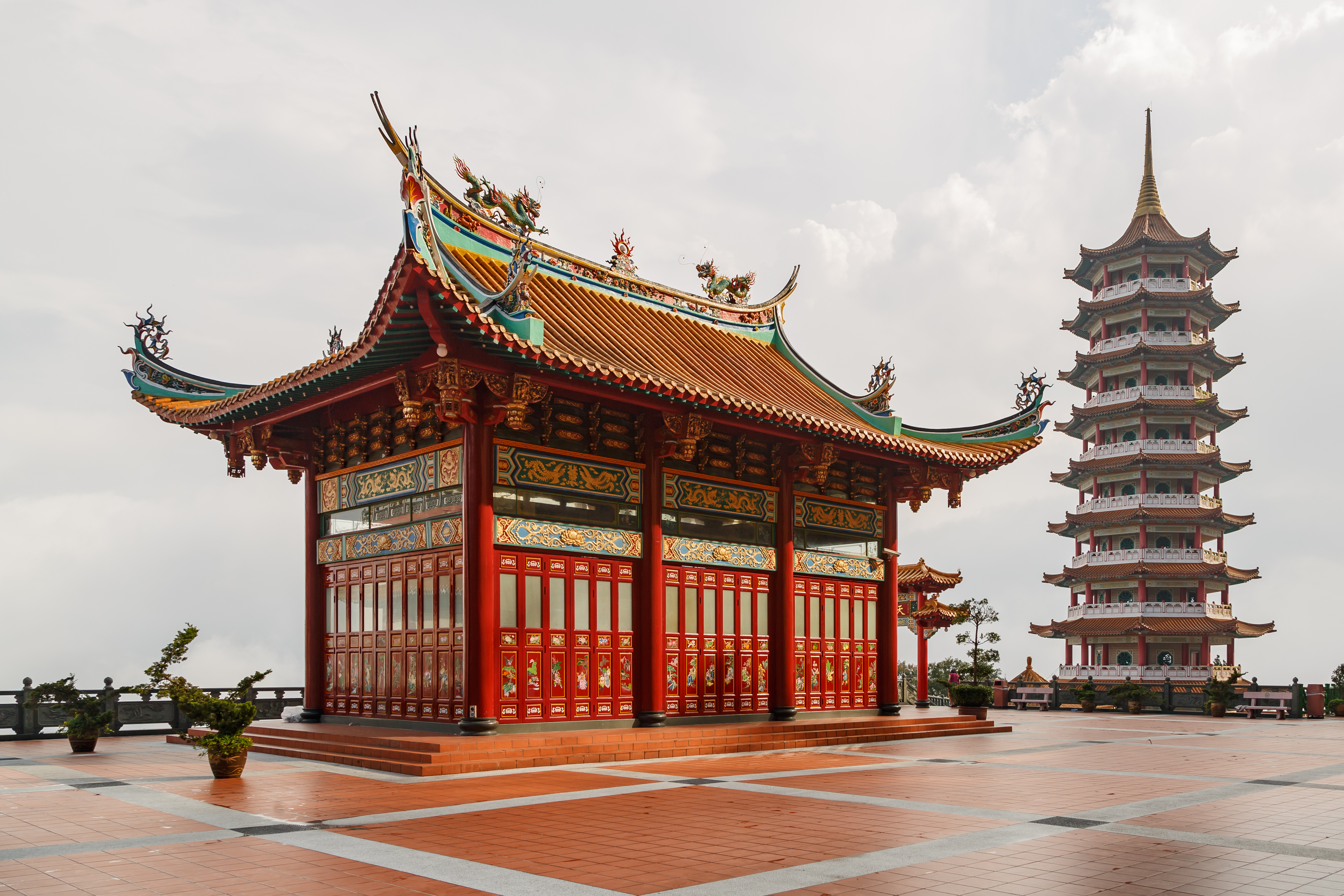
Chin Swee Caves Temple.

- Chin Swee Caves Temple: A prominent Taoist and Buddhist temple complex named after Ancient Chinese monk Qingshui opened in 1994, situated at 1,514 metres (4,967 ft) elevation. Built on a steep rocky slope, it features a nine-storey Pagoda of 10,000 Buddhas, a giant statue of Buddha, and elaborate representations of the Ten Chambers of Hell.
- Gohtong Memorial Park: The private memorial garden and burial site of Genting Group founder Tan Sri Lim Goh Tong in Gohtong Jaya.
- Tan Sri Mohamed Noah Foundation Mosque: The sole public mosque in the resort area, dedicated to Genting co-founder Mohamed Noah Omar.
- Eufloria Gardens & Sculpture Park: An expansive floral conservatory and landscaped sculpture park opened in 2026, situated at the mid-hill zone near Gohtong Sentral.

== Transportation ==
Private road toll plaza on Jalan Genting Highlands

=== Road access and private road charge ===
The principal route to Genting Highlands branches off the Kuala Lumpur–Karak Expressway at Genting Sempah onto Jalan Genting Highlands, climbing towards Gohtong Jaya and the summit. From the west, the Batang Kali–Genting Highlands road connects the resort with Batang Kali and Rawang in Selangor.

Jalan Genting Highlands operates as a private mountain roadway maintained by Lingkaran Cekap Sdn Bhd. A private road entry charge is collected at two gantry checkpoints: the Genting Highlands Entry at Genting Sempah and the Gohtong Jaya Entry at the main Gohtong Jaya roundabout. Standard tolls apply to private passenger vehicles, vans, buses, and commercial lorries, while two-wheeled motorcycles and emergency vehicles remain exempt.

=== Cable cars ===
Two separate gondola systems provide aerial transport between the mid-hill transit hubs and the mountain summit:

- Awana SkyWay: The resort's primary high-capacity monocable gondola lift, operating between Sky Sentral Station (adjacent to GHPO) and Genting Highlands Station at SkyAvenue. Spanning 2,642 metres (8,668 ft) with a vertical climb of 630 metres (2,070 ft), it includes an intermediate stop at Chin Swee Station. The system operates standard 10-passenger cabins and glass-floor cabins from 7:00 a.m. to 11:00 p.m. daily.
- Genting SkyWay: The heritage gondola lift line connecting Gohtong Sentral Station in Gohtong Jaya directly with Resorts World Station at RW Hotel. Spanning 3,576 metres (11,732 ft) with an 870 metres (2,850 ft) vertical rise, it operates daily between 9:00 a.m. and 7:00 p.m., while also offering extended standby capacity during Awana SkyWay maintenance periods.

=== Bus services ===
The primary regional public bus terminus is the Sky Sentral Bus Terminal, located on Level 1 of the mid-hill Sky Sentral transport complex below the Awana SkyWay station. Passengers booked with accommodation at Resorts World Genting would need to transfer to the Awana SkyWay to reach their destination.

- Express coaches: Genting Express buses operate regular schedules linking Sky Sentral with KL Sentral, Terminal Bersepadu Gombak, Pudu Sentral, Terminal Bersepadu Selatan (TBS) and Kuala Lumpur International Airport Terminal 1 & 2 Bus Terminal. Additional commercial express coaches connect the terminal directly with Klang, Shah Alam, Seremban, Malacca City, and Singapore.
- Local stage buses: Regular commuter connections between Kuala Lumpur and the mid-hill terminal are provided by Wawasan Sutera via Route 270, originating from Pekeliling Bus Terminal adjacent to the Titiwangsa station as a LRT, MRT and Monorail interchange interchange. Regional connectivity on the Pahang side includes a Sri Marong service linking the bus terminal with Bentong. Historically, there is a local bus connection between Batang Kali KTM station and Genting Highlands via Route 159.
- Internal shuttles: Free shuttle buses operate frequently between Resorts World Awana, Gohtong Sentral, and Sky Sentral, as well as between hilltop hotel lobbies.

== Government and politics ==
Due to its position straddling the state boundary, Genting Highlands is divided across federal and state electoral constituencies:

- Federal Parliament: The Pahang sector falls within the Bentong parliamentary constituency (represented by Young Syefura Othman), while the Selangor sector is part of the Hulu Selangor constituency (represented by Mohd Hasnizan Harun).
- State Legislative Assemblies: The eastern sector forms part of the Ketari constituency in the Pahang State Legislative Assembly (held by Su Keong Siong), while the western slopes fall under the Batang Kali constituency in the Selangor State Legislative Assembly (held by Muhammad Muhaimin Harith Abdullah Sani).
- Local Government: Municipal administration and property planning are overseen respectively by the Bentong Municipal Council (MPB) in Pahang and the Hulu Selangor Municipal Council (MPHS) in Selangor.

== See also ==
- Awana SkyWay
- Genting SkyWay
- Genting SkyWorlds
- First World Hotel
- Genting Grand Hotel
- RW Hotel
- Chin Swee Caves Temple
- Gohtong Jaya
