= Genting Malaysia Berhad =

Malaysian gambling and hospitality company

- Formerly: Resorts World Berhad
- Type: Public limited company
- Traded as: MYX: 4715
- ISIN: MYL4715OO008
- Founded: 7 May 1980; 46 years ago
- Headquarters: 24th Floor, Wisma Genting, Jalan Sultan Ismail, 50250 Kuala Lumpur, Malaysia
- Website: www.gentingmalaysia.com

Genting Malaysia Berhad (MYX: 4715, Chinese: 云顶马来西亚有限公司, stylized GM), commonly known as Genting Malaysia, started in 1980 in Malaysia. In 1989, Genting Group and Resorts World Bhd underwent a restructuring exercise, which resulted in Resorts World Bhd acquiring from Genting Group of its entire gaming, hotel and resort-related operations inclusive of goodwill and other relevant assets. Resorts World Bhd is the subsidiary company of Genting Bhd under the leisure and hospitality division. Basically it manages everything at Genting Highlands except First World Hotel and First World Plaza, which are under First World Hotel & Resort Sdn Bhd.

Resorts World Bhd's main activities include tourist resort business at Genting Highlands and its activities cover leisure and hospitality services, which comprise amusement, gaming, hotel and entertainment. There are currently six hotel properties at Genting Highlands Resort comprising Genting Hotel, Highlands Hotel, Theme Park Hotel and Resort Hotel, Awana Genting Highlands, Golf & Country Resort and First World Hotel.

People tend to confuse in determining the exact name of the place. The geographical place name is called Genting Highlands. The official company name managing the activities at the highlands are Resorts World Bhd and First World Hotel & Resort Sdn Bhd. These two companies combined became Genting Highlands Resorts, with its motto Genting – City of Entertainment.
