= Awana Skyway =

Gondola lift in Pahang, Malaysia

Coordinates: 3°24′28″N 101°46′58″E

Awana SkyWay 云天缆车
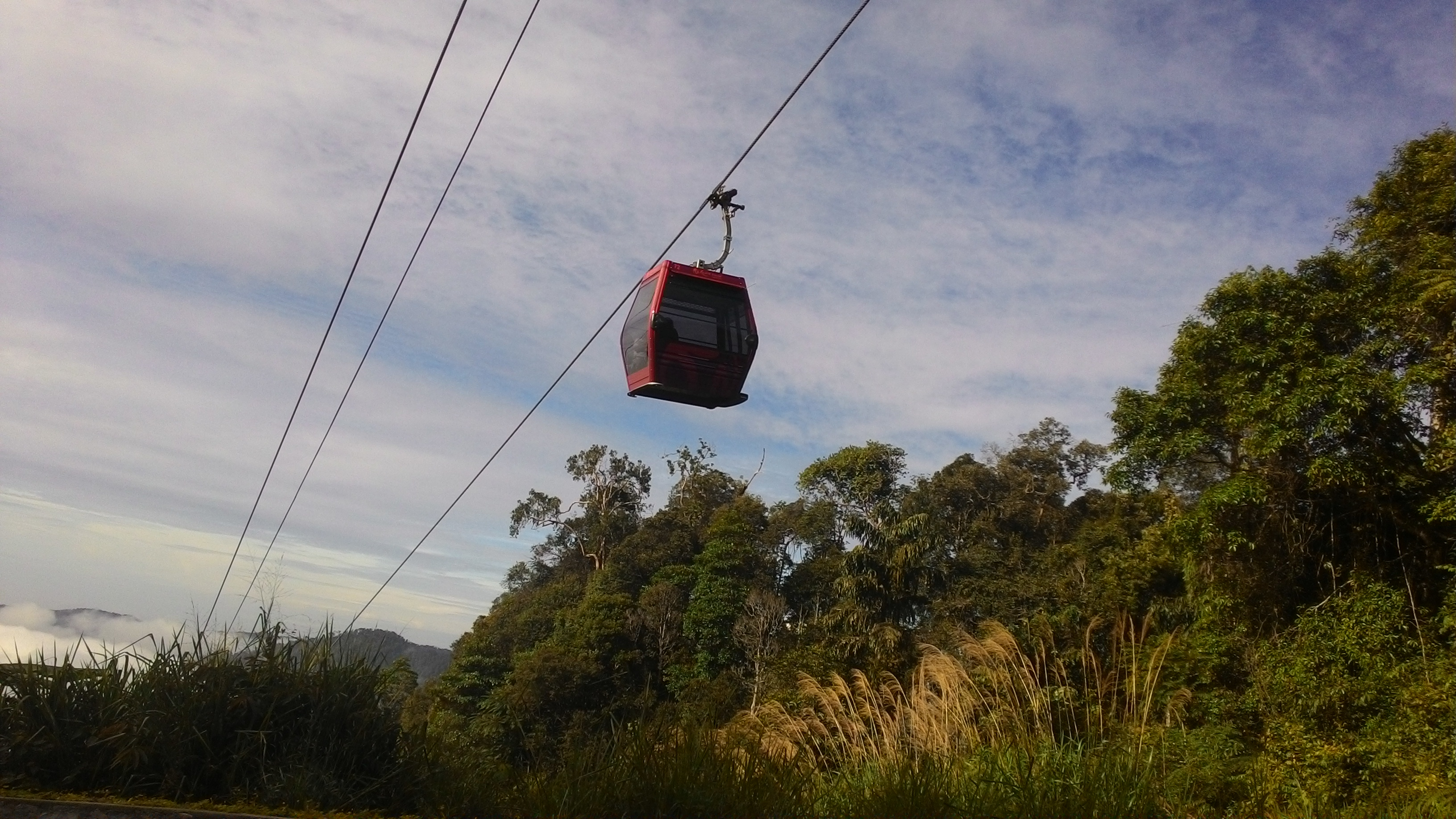
- Gondolas of the Awana SkyWay
- Interactive map of Awana SkyWay 云天缆车

Overview
- Status: Operational
- System: Detachable monocable gondola lift (GD10)
- Location: Genting Highlands, Bentong District, Pahang, Malaysia
- Termini: Sky Sentral Station; Genting Highlands Station (SkyAvenue)
- No. of stations: 3
- Open: 22 December 2016; 9 years ago (current system)

Operation
- Owner: Genting Malaysia Berhad
- Carrier capacity: 10 passengers per standard gondola; 6 per glass-floor gondola; 3,600 passengers per hour
- Trip duration: Approximately 10 minutes

Technical features
- Aerial lift type: Cable car
- Line length: 2,642 m (8,668 ft)
- Operating speed: 6 m/s (22 km/h; 13 mph)
- Vertical Interval: 630 m (2,070 ft)

Awana SkyWay is a gondola lift serving Genting Highlands in Bentong District, Pahang, Malaysia. Connecting the mid-hill hub of Sky Sentral with SkyAvenue at the resort summit, the line includes an intermediate station serving the Chin Swee Caves Temple.

The current system opened on 22 December 2016, replacing an earlier aerial tramway that operated along a different alignment from 1975 to 2014. It serves as the primary aerial connection to Resorts World Genting, operating alongside the older Genting SkyWay.

== Route and operations ==
The route serves three stations: Sky Sentral Station at mid-hill, Chin Swee Station, and Genting Highlands Station (integrated with the SkyAvenue lifestyle mall at the summit). Passengers traveling between the base and summit may alight at Chin Swee Station to visit the temple complex and re-board toward their destination using the same ticket.

The journey covers an inclined length of 2,642 metres (8,668 ft) with a vertical rise of 630 metres (2,070 ft), ascending from approximately 1,105 metres (3,625 ft) above sea level at Sky Sentral to 1,725 metres (5,659 ft) at the upper terminus in about ten minutes. The lower terminus is integrated with the Sky Sentral transport hub and the multi-storey park-and-ride facility at Genting Highlands Premium Outlets.

As of 2026, Awana SkyWay operates daily between 7:00 a.m. and 11:00 p.m. During its scheduled maintenance periods, resort operations are transferred to the Genting SkyWay, which expands its hours to match Awana SkyWay's schedule.

== Engineering and specifications ==
The installation was designed and manufactured by Leitner Ropeways as a GD10 detachable monocable gondola lift supported by 22 towers. Operating at a maximum rope speed of 6 metres per second (22 km/h; 13 mph), the system is powered by an installed drive capacity of 1,298 kW and provides a maximum throughput of 3,600 passengers per hour in each direction.

The system is equipped with a 60-millimetre (2.4 in) diameter FATZER COMPACTA haul rope spanning a total length of 5,980 metres (19,620 ft) across the installation. The cabin fleet originally opened with 99 Leitner Diamond cabins, including ten fitted with laminated glass floors. Standard cabins accommodate up to ten passengers, while glass-floor cabins carry up to six.

== History ==
=== First generation (1975–2014) ===
The original Awana Skyway opened in 1975 as the first cable-car system in Malaysia and the earliest aerial connection built for Genting Highlands. It operated as an aerial tramway connecting the Awana Golf & Country Resort area with the hilltop hotels. After nearly four decades of service, the bi-cable tramway was decommissioned on 1 April 2014 to make way for a modern, higher-capacity gondola lift system aligned with the Genting Integrated Tourism Plan.

=== Second generation (2016–present) ===
Built on a new alignment, the second-generation Awana SkyWay officially opened on 22 December 2016 in conjunction with the phased opening of SkyAvenue. The system handled over 1.19 million passengers during its first two months of commercial operation, setting a single-day record of approximately 42,000 riders during the 1997 Chinese New Year holiday. By August 2017, ridership had surpassed 3.5 million.

The opening of the new monocable system shifted the primary resort traffic from the Genting SkyWay, which was subsequently relegated mainly to peak periods and maintenance relief. Together, the two lines carried more than 6.1 million visitors to the summit in 2024. While promotional materials briefly branded the service as the "Genting Highlands Premium Outlets Cable Car" in early 2025, Resorts World Genting officially reverted to the Awana SkyWay title by 2026.

== See also ==
- Genting SkyWay
- Langkawi Cable Car
- Penang Hill Railway
