= Genting Grand Hotel =

Hotel in Bentong, Pahang, Malaysia

Coordinates: 3.423587°N 101.792724°E

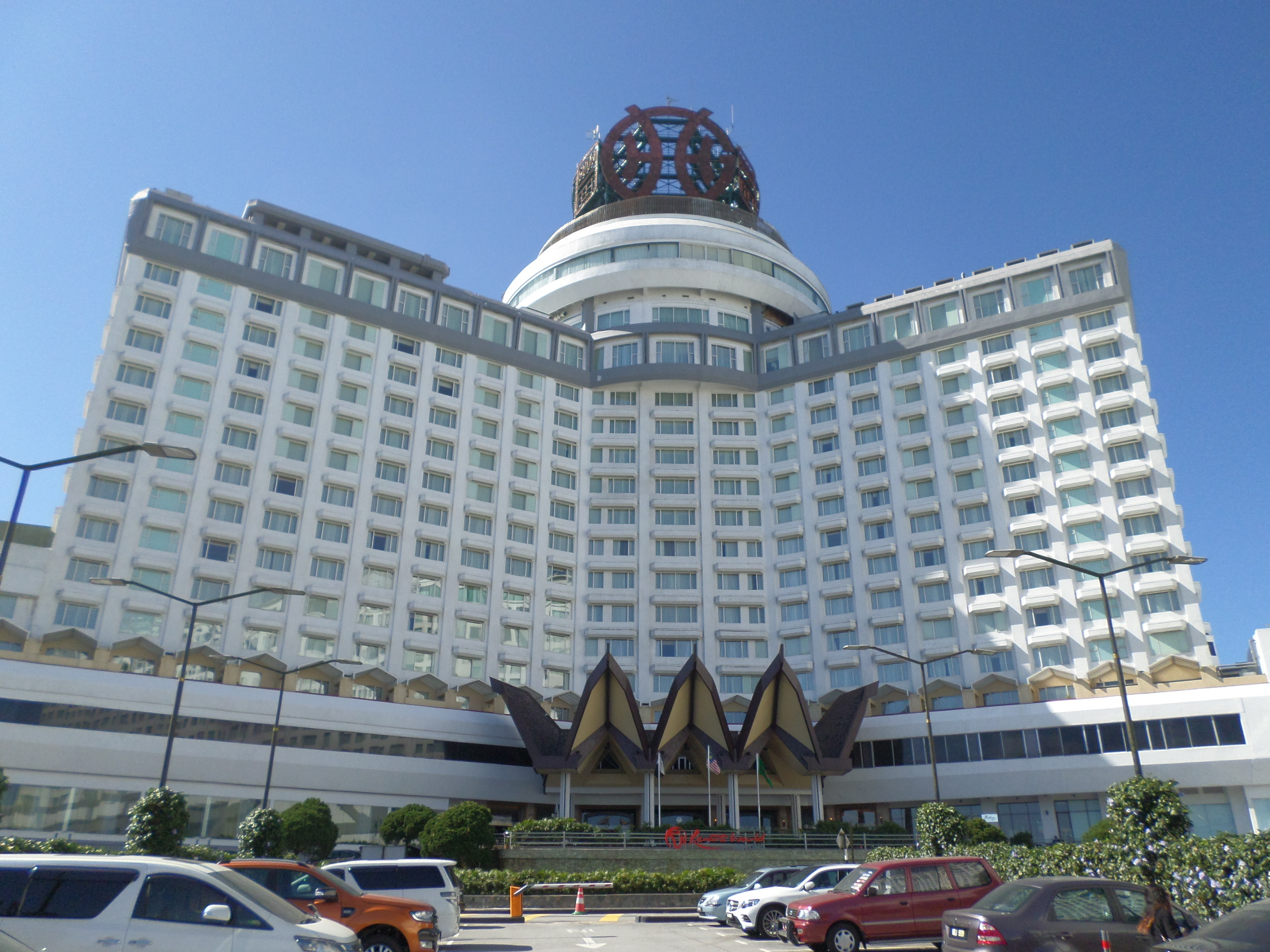
Genting Grand hotel building

Genting Grand is a Y-shaped building hotel in Resorts World Genting, Pahang, Malaysia. It is one of the seven accommodations in the integrated hill resort and shares the building with the Resort Hotel. The hotel is notable with its trademark Genting logo on top of the building.

== History ==
Genting Grand was initially built in 1978 as Genting Hotel and was the second hotel built in Genting Highlands Resort (rebranded as Resorts World Genting) after Theme Park Hotel was built in 1971. It underwent two renovations, first in 2003 to 2004 in Genting Grand Complex and again from June 2012 to January 2013. After finishing its renovation in 2013, it changed its name from Genting Hotel to Genting Grand.

In 2018, Genting Grand was awarded with a 4-star rating from Forbes Travel Guide Star Ratings and its sister hotel, Maxims Hotel received a "recommended" accreditation.

== Genting Grand Complex ==
When Genting Grand Complex opened, along with the hotel, it consist of a casino, services and a few restaurants.

Later on, 3 more attractions were added to entertain guests. In 1992, it transformed into an indoor theme park with new attractions being added such as an arcade, indoor roller coaster, motion simulator, carnival games, dark rides and more but some were removed. Many of the attractions are shifted to First World Plaza in 2003, leaving behind arcade games, kiddie rides and carnival games.

Currently, it is an arcade complex which extends to nearby Maxims. The complex is mostly spread across the lower ground floor and ground floor while a few shops are located on other floors with some shops in the adjacent Resort Hotel. The complex mostly houses eateries and other attractions including Vision City Video Games Park (formally Genting Indoor Theme Park) and Visitors' Galeria. The complex is also the main entrance for Genting Casino as well as Genting Club, an exclusive club for VIP customers.
