= Contents of the Voyager Golden Record =

Sights and sounds of Earth, encoded in a time capsule in interstellar space

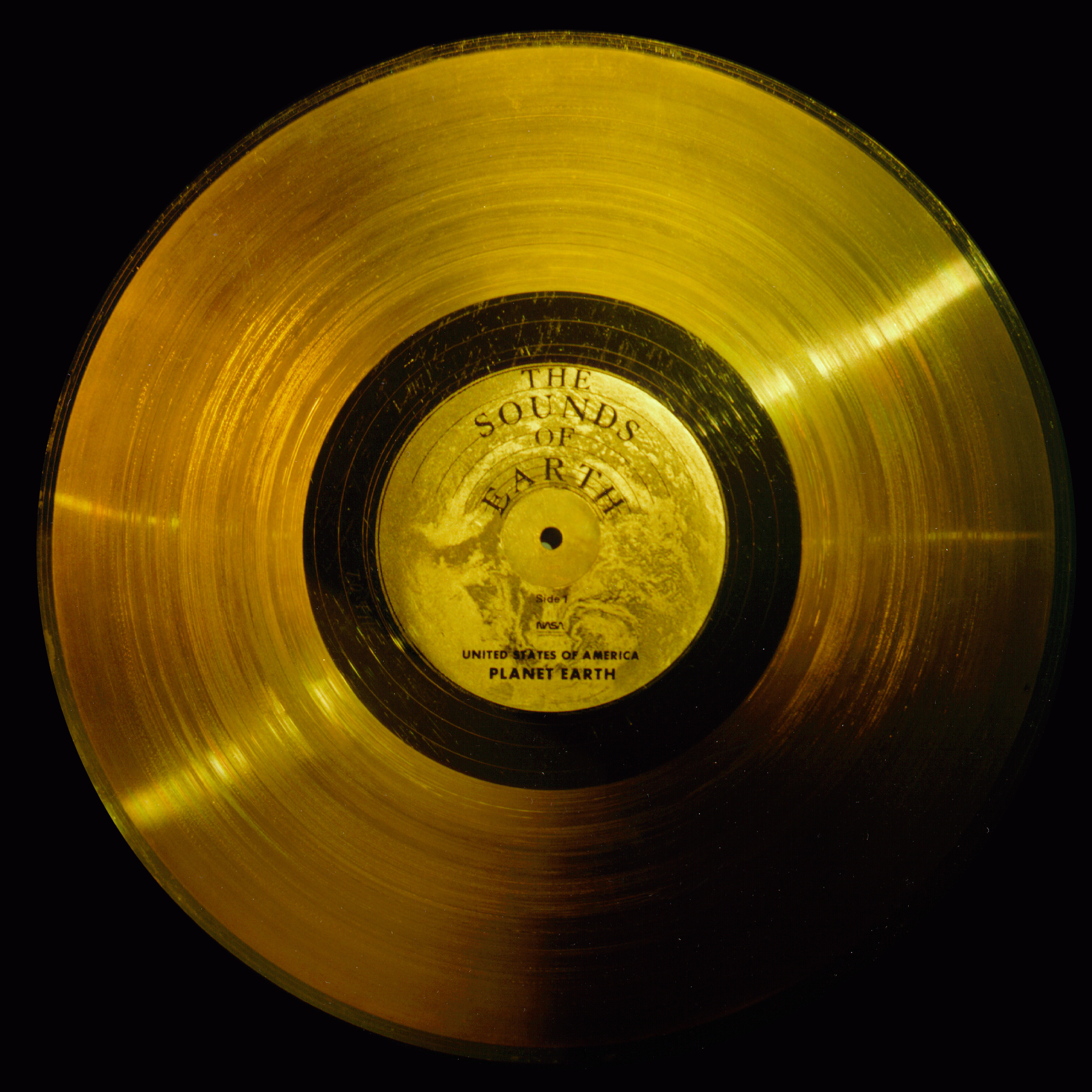

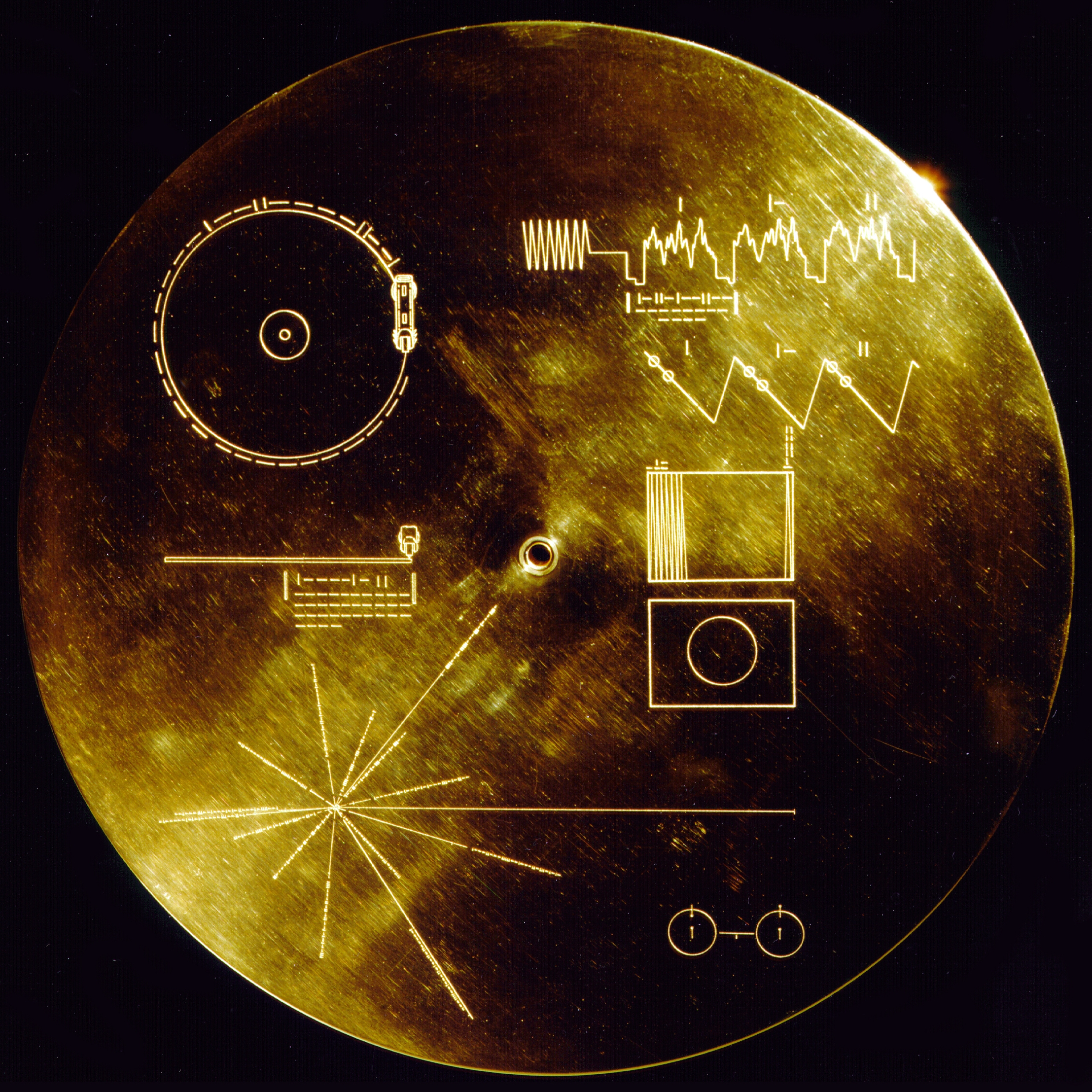
The Voyager Golden Record (above) and its cover (below)

The Voyager Golden Record contains 116 images and a variety of sounds. The items for the record, which is carried on both the Voyager 1 and Voyager 2 spacecraft, were selected for NASA by a committee chaired by Carl Sagan of Cornell University. Included are natural sounds (including some made by animals), musical selections from different cultures and eras, spoken greetings in 55 languages, human sounds like footsteps and laughter, and printed messages from U.S. President Jimmy Carter and U.N. Secretary-General Kurt Waldheim.

== Greetings ==
The first audio section contains a spoken greeting in English from Secretary-General of the United Nations Kurt Waldheim.

"Greetings From The Secretary General Of The UN Kurt Waldheim"
Spoken greeting in English by U.N. Secretary-General Kurt Waldheim

"Greetings In 55 Languages"
Spoken greetings in 55 ancient and modern languages. Nick Sagan, aged 6, gives the final greeting in English (around 4:19)

The second audio section ("Greetings in 55 Languages") contains spoken greetings in 55 languages. The original plan was to use greetings made by United Nations delegates, but various problems with these recordings led to new recordings being made at Cornell University by people from the foreign-language departments. The number of native speakers of these 55 languages combined (excluding L2 speakers) is over 4.7 billion people, comprising over 65% of the world population. It includes four Chinese languages (marked with **), twelve South Asian languages (marked #) and five ancient languages (marked §), listed here in alphabetical order:

- Akkadian§
- Amoy** (Southern Min/Hokkien)
- Ancient Greek§
- Arabic (Modern Standard)
- Aramaic
- Armenian
- Bengali#
- Burmese
- Czech
- Dutch
- English
- French
- Ganda
- German
- Gujarati#
- Hebrew
- Hindi#
- Hittite§
- Hungarian
- Ila (Zambia)
- Indonesian
- Italian
- Japanese
- Kannada#
- Korean
- Latin§
- Mandarin**
- Marathi#
- Nepali#
- Nguni
- Nyanja
- Oriya#
- Persian
- Polish
- Portuguese
- Punjabi#
- Quechua
- Rajasthani#
- Romanian
- Russian
- Serbian
- Sinhala#
- Sotho
- Spanish
- Sumerian§
- Swedish
- Telugu#
- Thai
- Turkish
- Ukrainian
- Urdu#
- Vietnamese
- Welsh
- Wu** (Shanghainese)
- Yue** (Cantonese)

This is a list of the recorded greetings in order of appearance.

Time	Language	Speaker	Original	English translation
0:00:00	Sumerian	David I. Owen	𒁲𒈠𒃶𒈨𒂗 (šilim-ma hé-me-en)	May all be well.
0:00:04	Ancient Greek	Frederick M. Ahl	Οἵτινές ποτ᾿ ἔστε χαίρετε! Εἰρηνικῶς πρὸς φίλους ἐληλύθαμεν φίλοι. (Hoitines pot'este chairete! Eirēnikōs pros philous elēlythamen philoi.)	Greetings to you, whoever you are. We come in friendship to those who are friends. (Note: Somewhat loose translation; per NASA.)
0:00:11	Portuguese	Janet Sternberg	Paz e felicidade a todos	Peace and happiness to everyone.
0:00:14	Cantonese	Stella Lau Fessler	各位好嗎？祝各位平安健康快樂。; Gok^{3} wai^{2} hou^{2} maa^{1}? Zuk^{1} gok^{3} wai^{2} ping^{4} on^{1} gin^{6} hong^{1} faai^{3} lok^{6}.	How's everyone? Wish you peace, health and happiness.
0:00:19	Akkadian	David I. Owen	Adanniš lu šulmu	May all be very well.
0:00:22	Russian	Maria Rubinova	Здравствуйте! Приветствую вас! (Zdravstvuyte! Privyetstvyu vas!)	Greetings! I welcome you!
0:00:25	Thai	Ruchira Mendiones	สวัสดีค่ะ สหายในธรณีโพ้น พวกเราในธรณีนี้ขอส่งมิตรจิตมาถึงท่านทุกคน (Sà-wàt-dii kâ, sà-hǎai nai tɔɔ-rá-nii póon. Pûuak-rao nai tɔɔ-rá-nii níi kɔ̌ɔ sòng mít-dtrà-jìt maa tʉ̌ng tâan túk-kon)	Hello friends from farland. We in this land have sent you warm greeting to you all.
0:00:32	Arabic	Amahl Shakh	.تحياتنا للأصدقاء في النجوم. يا ليت يجمعنا الزمان (Taḥiyyātunā lil-'aṣdiqā' fin-nujūm. Yā layt yajma`unā az-zamān.)	Our greetings to the friends amongst the stars. We wish that time would unite us.
0:00:38	Romanian	Sanda Huffman	Salutări la toată lumea	Regards to everyone.
0:00:42	French	Alexandra Littauer	Bonjour tout le monde	Hello, everyone.
0:00:45	Burmese	Maung Myo Lwin	နေကောင်းပါသလား (Naykaungg parsalarr?)	Are you well?
0:00:48	Hebrew	David I. Owen	שלום (Shalom)	Peace.
0:00:50	Spanish	Erik J. Beukenkamp	Hola y saludos a todos	Hello and greetings to everyone.
0:00:54	Indonesian	Ilyas Harun	Selamat malam hadirin sekalian, selamat berpisah dan sampai bertemu lagi di lain waktu	Good night, ladies and gentlemen. Goodbye and see you next time.
0:00:59	Kechua (Quechua)	Fredy Roncalla	Kay pachamamta niytapas maytapas rimapallasta runasimipi	Hello to everybody from this Earth, in Quechua language.
0:01:04	Punjabi	Jatinder N. Paul	ਆਓ ਜੀ, ਜੀ ਆਇਆਂ ਨੂੰ / آؤ جی، جی آیا نوں (Aao ji, jee aya nu)	Welcome home. It is a pleasure to receive you.
0:01:07	Hittite	David I. Owen	aššuli	Greetings / Hail! (literally "in goodwill")
0:01:08	Bengali	Subrata Mukherjee	নমস্কার, বিশ্বে শান্তি হোক (Nômośkār, biśśē śānti hōk)	Hello! Let there be peace everywhere.
0:01:11	Latin	Frederick M. Ahl	Salvete quicumque estis; bonam erga vos voluntatem habemus, et pacem per astra ferimus	Greetings to you, whoever you are; we have good will towards you and bring peace across space.
0:01:19	Aramaic	David I. Owen	𐡌𐡋𐡔 or שלם or ܫܠܡ (Šəlām)	Hello (literally "peace")
0:01:22	Dutch	Joan de Boer	Hartelijke groeten aan iedereen	Dear/sincere greetings to everyone.
0:01:24	German	Renate Born	Herzliche Grüße an alle	Warm greetings to everyone.
0:01:27	Urdu	Salma Alzal	السلام عليکم ـ ہم زمين کے رہنے والوں کى طرف سے آپ کو خوش آمديد کہتے ھيں (Assalamu alaikum. Hum zameen ke rehne waalon ki taraf se aap ko khush aamdeed kehte hain.)	Peace be upon you. We, the inhabitants of this earth, send our greetings to you.
0:01:37	Vietnamese	Trần Trọng Hải	Chân thành gửi tới các bạn lời chào thân hữu	Sincerely sending greetings to you.
0:01:40	Turkish	Peter Ian Kuniholm	Sayın Türkçe bilen arkadaşlarımız, sabah şerifleriniz hayrolsun	Dear Turkish-speaking friends, may the honors of the morning be upon your heads.
0:01:45	Japanese	Mari Noda	こんにちは。お元気ですか？ (Konnichiwa. O genki desu ka?)	Hello (literally "How is your day?"), how are you?
0:01:48	Hindi	Omar Alzal	धरती के वासियों की ओर से नमस्कार (Dharati ke waasiyon ki or se namaskar)	Greetings from the inhabitants of the earth.
0:01:51	Welsh	Frederick M. Ahl	Iechyd da i chi yn awr, ac yn oesoedd	Good health to you now and forever.
0:01:54	Italian	Debby Grossvogel	Tanti auguri e saluti	Many greetings and wishes.
0:01:57	Sinhala	Kamal de Abrew	ආයුබෝවන්! (Āyubōwan!)	Wish You a Long Life.
0:02:00	Zulu (isiZulu)	Fred Dube	Siya nibingelela maqhawe sinifisela inkonzo ende.	We greet you, great ones. We wish you longevity.
0:02:05	Sotho (Sesotho)	Fred Dube	Reani lumelisa marela.	We greet you, O great ones.
0:02:08	Wu	Yvonne Meinwald	祝㑚大家好。 Tsoh^{3} na^{13} da^{11} ka^{53} hoa^{34}	Best wishes to you all.
0:02:12	Armenian	Araxy Terzian	Բոլոր անոնց որ կը գտնուին տիեզերգի միգամածութիւնէն անդին, ողջոյններ (Bolor anonts’ vor ky gtnuin tiezergi migamatsut’iwnen andin, voghjoynner)	To all those who exist in the universe, greetings.
0:02:19	Korean	Soon Hee Shin	안녕하세요 (Annyeong haseyo)	Hello (literally "Are you peaceful?" or "Be peaceful")
0:02:22	Polish	Maria Nowakowska-Stycos	Witajcie, istoty z zaświatów.	Welcome, beings from beyond the world.
0:02:25	Nepali	Durga Prashad Ojha	प्रिथ्वी वासीहरु बाट शान्ति मय भविष्य को शुभकामना (Prithvī vāsīharu bāṭa śānti maya bhaviṣya kō śubhakāmanā)	Wishing you a peaceful future from the earthlings.
0:02:29	Mandarin Chinese	Liang Ku	各位都好吧？我们都很想念你们，有空请到这儿来玩。; 各位都好吧？我們都很想念你們，有空請到這兒來玩。; Gèwèi dōu hǎo ba? Wǒmen dōu hěn xiǎngniàn nǐmen, yǒu kòng qǐng dào zhè'er lái wán.	How's everyone? We all very much wish to meet you, if you're free please come and visit.
0:02:35	Ila	Saul Moobola	Mypone kaboutu noose.	We wish all of you well.
0:02:38	Swedish	Gunnel Almgren Schaar	Hälsningar från en dataprogrammerare i den lilla universitetsstaden Ithaca på planeten Jorden	Greetings from a computer programmer in the small university town of Ithaca on (the) planet Earth.
0:02:45	Nyanja	Saul Moobola	Mulibwanji imwe boonse bantu bakumwamba.	How are all you people of other planets?
0:02:48	Gujarati	Radhekant Dave	પૃથ્વી ઉપર વસનાર એક માનવ તરફથી બ્રહ્માંડના અન્ય અવકાશમાં વસનારાઓને હાર્દિક અભિનંદન. આ સંદેશો મળ્યે, વળતો સંદેશો મોકલાવશો. (Pr̥thvī upara vasanāra ēka mānava taraphathī brahmāṇḍanā an'ya avakāśamāṁ vasanārā'ōnē hārdika abhinandana. Ā sandēśō maḷyē, vaḷatō sandēśō mōkalāvaśō.)	Greetings from a human being of the Earth. Please contact.
0:03:03	Ukrainian	Andrew Cehelsky	Пересилаємо привіт із нашого світу, бажаємо щастя, здоров'я і многая літа (Peresylayemo pryvit iz nashoho svitu, bazhayemo shchastya, zdorov'ya i mnohaya lita)	We are sending greetings from our world, wishing you happiness, health and many years.
0:03:09	Persian	Eshagh Samehyeh	درود بر ساکنین ماورای آسمان‌ها. بنی‌آدم اعضای یک پیکرند، که در آفرینش ز یک گوهرند، چو عضوی به درد آورد روزگار، دگر عضوها را نماند قرار. (Dorud bar sâkenin mawrah âsemân-hâ'. Bani âdam a'zâye yek peykarand, ke dar āfarinesh ze yek goharand, cho 'ozvi be dard âvarad ruzegâr, degar 'ozvhâ râ namânad qarâr.)	Greetings to the residents of far skies. Human Beings are members of a whole, In creation of one essence and soul, If one member is inflicted with pain, Other members uneasy will remain.
0:03:22	Serbian	Milan Mihailo Smiljanić	Желимо вам све најлепше са наше планете (Želimo vam sve najlepše sa naše planete)	We wish you all the best, from our planet.
0:03:25	Oriya	Raghaba Prasada Sahu	ସୂର୍ଯ୍ୟ ତାରକାର ତୃତୀୟ ଗ୍ରହ ପୃଥିବୀରୁ ବିଶ୍ୱବ୍ରହ୍ମାଣ୍ଡର ଅଧିବାସୀ ମାନଙ୍କୁ ଅଭିନନ୍ଦନ (Sūryẏa tārakāra tr̥tīẏa graha pr̥thibīru biśẇabrahmāṇḍara adhibāsī mānaṅku abhinandana.)	Greetings to the inhabitants of the universe from the third planet Earth of the star Sun.
0:03:34	Ganda (Luganda)	Elijah Mwima-Mudeenya	Musulayo mutya abantu bensi eno mukama abawe emirembe bulijo.	Greetings to all peoples of the universe. God give you peace always.
0:03:38	Marathi	Arati Pandit	नमस्कार. ह्या पृथ्वीतील लोक तुम्हाला त्यांचे शुभविचार पाठवतात आणि त्यांची इच्छा आहे की तुम्ही ह्या जन्मी धन्य व्हा. (Namaskāra. Hyā pr̥thvītīla lōka tumhālā tyān̄cē śubhavicāra pāṭhavatāta āṇi tyān̄cī icchā āhē kī tumhī hyā janmī dhan'ya vhā.)	Greetings. The people of the Earth send their good wishes and hope you find good fortune in this life.
0:03:47	Amoy (Southern Min/Hokkien)	Margaret Sook Ching See Gebauer	太空朋友，恁好！恁食飽未？有閒著來阮遮坐喔。 (Thài-khong pêng-iú, lín-hó. Lín chia̍h-pá--bē? Ū-êng, to̍h lâi gún chia chē--ô͘!)	Friends from space, how are you all? Have you eaten yet? Come visit us if you have time.
0:03:55	Hungarian (Magyar)	Elizabeth Bilson	Üdvözletet küldünk magyar nyelven minden békét szerető lénynek a Világegyetemen	We are sending greetings in the Hungarian language to all peace-loving beings on the Universe.
0:04:01	Telugu	Prasad Kodukula	నమస్తే, తెలుగు మాట్లాడే జనముననించి మా శుభాకాంక్షలు. (Namastē, telugu māṭlāḍē janamunanin̄ci mā śubhākāṅkṣalu)	Greetings. Best wishes from Telugu-speaking people.
0:04:05	Czech	Václav Kostroun	Milí přátelé, přejeme vám vše nejlepší	Dear Friends, we wish you the best.
0:04:08	Kannada (Kanarese)	Shrinivasa K. Upadhyaya	ನಮಸ್ತೆ, ಕನ್ನಡಿಗರ ಪರವಾಗಿ ಶುಭಾಷಯಗಳು. (Namaste, kannaḍigara paravāgi śubhāṣayagaḷu.)	Greetings. On behalf of Kannada-speaking people, 'good wishes'.
0:04:12	Rajasthani	Mool C. Gupta	सब भाइमो ने म्हारो राम पहुॅचे हमा अंडे खुशी डॉ उम्हा वहाँ खुगो रीगो (Sab bhaimo ne mharo Ram pahunche, hama ande khushi do umha vahan khugo rigo)	Hello to everyone. We are happy here and you be happy there.
0:04:18	English	Nick Sagan	Hello from the children of planet Earth.	

The third audio section (United Nations Greetings / Whale Songs) includes some greetings from United Nations officials, including one in the international language Esperanto, plus some whale songs.

== Sounds ==
The next audio section is devoted to the "sounds of Earth" that include:

- "Music of the Spheres" – Johannes Kepler's Harmonices Mundi realized by Laurie Spiegel
- Volcanoes, Earthquake, Thunder
- Mud Pots
- Wind, Rain, Surf
- Crickets, Frogs
- Birds, Hyena, Elephant, Whale
- Chimpanzee
- Wind
- Wild Dog
- Heartbeat, Footsteps, Laughter (Carl Sagan's)
- The First Tools
- Tame Dog
- Herding Sheep, Blacksmith, Sawing
- Tractor, Riveter
- Morse Code, Ships (precisely, a ship's horn)
- Horse and Cart
- Train (specifically the bell and whistle of a steam locomotive)
- Tractor, Bus, Auto
- F-111 Flyby, Saturn V Lift-off (Apollo 15)
- Kiss, Mother and Child
- Life Signs, Pulsar

Included within the Sounds of Earth audio portion of the Golden Record is a track containing the inspirational message per aspera ad astra in Morse code. Translated from Latin, it means 'through hardships to the stars.'

=== Brainwaves ===
The life signs included on the record were an hour-long recording of the heartbeat and brainwaves of Ann Druyan, who would later marry Carl Sagan. The hour-long recording was compressed into the span of a minute to be able to fit into the record. In the epilogue of the 1997 book Billions and Billions, she describes the experience:

Earlier I had asked Carl if those putative extraterrestrials of a billion years from now could conceivably interpret the brain waves of a meditator. Who knows? A billion years is a long, long time, was his reply. On the chance that it might be possible why don't we give it a try? Two days after our life-changing phone call, I entered a laboratory at Bellevue Hospital in New York City and was hooked up to a computer that turned all the data from my brain and heart into sound. I had a one-hour mental itinerary of the information I wished to convey. I began by thinking about the history of Earth and the life it sustains. To the best of my abilities I tried to think something of the history of ideas and human social organization. I thought about the predicament that our civilization finds itself in and about the violence and poverty that make this planet a hell for so many of its inhabitants. Toward the end I permitted myself a personal statement of what it was like to fall in love.

On February 12, 2010, an interview with Ann Druyan was aired on NPR during which the above was explained in more detail.

== Music ==
Following the section on the sounds of Earth, there is an eclectic 90-minute selection of music from many cultures, including Eastern and Western classics. The selections include:

Country	Piece	Composer	Performer(s)	Recorded by / in	Genre of music	Length
Germany	Brandenburg Concerto No. 2 in F Major, BWV 1047: I. Allegro	Johann Sebastian Bach	Munich Bach Orchestra/Karl Richter (conductor) featuring Karl-Heinz Schneeberger (violin)	Recorded in Munich, January 1967	Classical music / Baroque music	4:40
Indonesia	Ketawang: Puspåwarnå (Kinds of Flowers)	Mangkunegara IV	Pura Paku Alaman Palace Orchestra/K.R.T. Wasitodipuro (director) featuring Niken Larasati and Nji Tasri (vocals)	Recorded by Robert E. Brown in Yogyakarta, Java on January 10, 1971	Folk music / Gamelan	4:43
Benin	Cengunmé	Traditional	Mahi musicians of Benin	Recorded by Charles Duvelle in Savalou, Dahomey, January 1963	Folk music / Percussion	2:08
Zaire	Alima Song	Traditional	Mbuti of the Ituri Rainforest	Recorded by Colin Turnbull and Francis S. Chapman in the Ituri Rainforest, Belgian Congo, circa 1951	Folk music	0:56
Australia	Barnumbirr (Morning Star) and Moikoi Song	Traditional	Tom Djäwa (clapsticks), Mudpo (digeridoo), and Waliparu (vocals)	Recorded by Sandra Le Brun Holmes at Milingimbi Mission on Milingimbi Island, off the coast of Arnhem Land, Northern Territory, circa 1962	Folk music / Australian Indigenous music	1:26
Mexico	El Cascabel (The Bell)	Lorenzo Barcelata	Antonio Maciel and Los Aguilillas with Mariachi México de Pepe Villa/Rafael Carrión (conductor)	Recorded at Musart Records, Mexico City, circa 1957	Mariachi	3:14
United States	Johnny B. Goode	Chuck Berry	Chuck Berry (vocals, guitar) with Lafayette Leake (piano), Willie Dixon (bass), and Fred Below (drums)	Recorded at Chess Studios, Chicago, Illinois, on January 6, 1958	Rock and roll	2:03
Papua New Guinea	Mariuamangɨ	Traditional	Pranis Pandang and Kumbui (mariuamangɨ) of the Nyaura Clan	Recorded by Robert MacLennan in the village of Kandɨngei, Middle Sepik, New Guinea on July 23, 1964	Folk music	1:20
Japan / United States	Sokaku-Reibo (Depicting The Cranes In Their Nest)	Arranged by Kinko Kurosawa	Gorō Yamaguchi (shakuhachi)	Recorded in New York City, circa 1967	Folk music / Honkyoku	4:51
Germany / Belgium	Partita for Violin Solo No. 3 in E Major, BWV 1006: III. Gavotte en Rondeau	Johann Sebastian Bach	Arthur Grumiaux (violin)	Recorded in Berlin, November 1960	Classical music / Baroque music	2:55
Austria / Germany	The Magic Flute (Die Zauberflöte), K. 620, Act II: Der Hölle Rache kocht in meinem Herzen (Hell's Vengeance Boils In My Heart)	Wolfgang Amadeus Mozart	Bavarian State Opera Orchestra and Chorus/Wolfgang Sawallisch (conductor) featuring Edda Moser (soprano)	Recorded in Munich, August 1972	Classical music / Opera / Singspiel	2:55
Georgia	Chakrulo	Traditional	Georgian State Merited Ensemble of Folk Song and Dance/Anzor Kavsadze (director) featuring Ilia Zakaidze (first tenor) and Rostom Saginashvili (second tenor)	Recorded at Melodiya Studio in Tbilisi, Georgia	Folk music / Choral music	2:18
Peru	Roncadoras and Drums	Traditional	Musicians from Ancash	From recordings collected by José María Arguedas (Casa de la Cultura) in the Ancash Region, circa 1964	Folk music	0:52
United States	Melancholy Blues	Marty Bloom and Walter Melrose	Louis Armstrong and His Hot Seven	Recorded in Chicago, Illinois on May 11, 1927	Jazz	3:05
Azerbaijan	Muğam (Çahargah ahəngi)	Traditional	Kamil Jalilov (balaban)	Recording of Radio Moscow	Folk music	2:30
Russia / France / United States	The Rite of Spring (Le Sacre Du Printemps), Part II: The Sacrifice: VI. Sacrificial Dance (The Chosen One)	Igor Stravinsky	Columbia Symphony Orchestra/Igor Stravinsky (conductor)	Recorded at the Ballroom of Hotel St. George, Brooklyn, New York on January 6, 1960	Modern classical music / Ballet	4:35
Germany / Canada / United States	The Well-Tempered Clavier, Book II, Prelude and Fugue in C major, BWV 870	Johann Sebastian Bach	Glenn Gould (piano)	Recorded at CBS 30th Street Studio in New York City on August 8, 1966	Classical music / Baroque music	4:48
Germany / United Kingdom	Symphony No. 5 in C minor, Opus 67: I. Allegro con brio	Ludwig van Beethoven	Philharmonia Orchestra/Otto Klemperer (conductor)	Recorded at Kingsway Hall, London on October 6, 1955	Classical music / Romantic music	8:50
Bulgaria	Izlel ye Delyo Haydutin	Traditional	Valya Balkanska (vocal), Lazar Kanevski, and Stephan Zahmanov (Kaba gaida)	Recorded by Martin Koenig and Ethel Raim in Smolyan, circa 1968	Folk music	4:59
United States	Navajo Night Chant, Yeibichai Dance	Traditional	Ambrose Roan Horse, Chester Roan, and Tom Roan	Recorded by Willard Rhodes in Pine Springs, Arizona, circa 1942	Folk music	0:57
United Kingdom	The Fairie Round	Anthony Holborne	Early Music Consort of London/David Munrow (director)	Recorded at EMI Recording Studios, London, September 1973	Classical music / Renaissance music	1:17
Solomon Islands	Naranaratana Kookokoo (The Cry of the Megapode Bird)	Traditional	Maniasinimae and Taumaetarau Chieftain Tribe of Oloha and Palasu'u Village Community in Small Malaita	Recording of Solomon Islands Broadcasting Services (SIBS)	Folk music	1:12
Peru	Wedding Song	Traditional	Performed by a young girl of Huancavelica	Recorded by John and Penny Cohen in Huancavelica, circa 1964	Folk music	0:38
China / Taiwan, Republic of China	Liu Shui (Flowing Streams)	Traditional; associated with Bo Ya	Guan Pinghu (guqin)	Recording of the UNESCO Collection	Folk music	7:37
India	Bhairavi: Jaat Kahan Ho	Traditional	Kesarbai Kerkar (vocals) with harmonium, tanpura and tabla accompaniment	Recorded in Bombay, April 1953	Hindustani Shastriya Sangeet (Indian classical music)	3:30
United States	Dark Was The Night, Cold Was The Ground	Blind Willie Johnson	Blind Willie Johnson (slide guitar, vocals)	Recorded in Dallas, Texas, on December 3, 1927	Blues	3:15
Germany / Hungary / United States	String Quartet No. 13: in B♭ major, Opus 130: V. Cavatina	Ludwig van Beethoven	Budapest String Quartet	Recorded at the Library of Congress, Washington, D.C., on April 7, 1960	Classical music / Romantic music	6:37

It has been claimed that Sagan had originally asked for permission to include "Here Comes the Sun" from the Beatles' album Abbey Road; but while the Beatles favored it, EMI opposed it and the song was not included. However, this has been denied by Timothy Ferris, who worked on the selection with Sagan; he said the song was never even considered for inclusion.

== Images ==
Along with the audio, the record contains a collection of 116 pictures (one of which is for calibration) detailing but not limited to human life on Earth and the planet itself. Many pictures are annotated with one or many indications of scales of time, size or mass. Some images also contain indications of chemical composition. All measures used on the pictures are first defined in the first few images using physical references.

Following is a list of all the images contained in the Voyager Golden Record together with a description of the nature of the image and what annotations were included in them, and when copyright permits, the actual image.

After NASA had received criticism over the nudity on the Pioneer plaque (line drawings of a naked man and woman), the agency chose not to allow Sagan and his colleagues to include George Hester's photograph of a nude man and woman on the record. Instead, only a silhouette of the couple was included.

An official statement by President Jimmy Carter was included as images (positions 117, 118). It reads, in part:

This Voyager spacecraft was constructed by the United States of America. We are a community of 240 million human beings among the more than 4 billion who inhabit the planet Earth. We human beings are still divided into nation states, but these states are rapidly becoming a global civilization. We cast this message into the cosmos ... It is likely to survive a billion years into our future, when our civilization is profoundly altered and the surface of the Earth may be vastly changed. Of the 200 billion stars in the Milky Way galaxy, some – perhaps many – may have inhabited planets and space faring civilizations. If one such civilization intercepts Voyager and can understand these recorded contents, here is our message: This is a present from a small distant world, a token of our sounds, our science, our images, our music, our thoughts, and our feelings. We are attempting to survive our time so we may live into yours. We hope some day, having solved the problems we face, to join a community of galactic civilizations. This record represents our hope and our determination and our goodwill in a vast and awesome universe.

Position	Description	Type and source	Annotations
1	Calibration circle	Black-and-white diagram	
2	Solar location map	Black-and-white diagram	
3	Mathematical definitions	Black-and-white text	
4	Physical unit definitions	Black-and-white text	
5	Solar System parameters	Black-and-white text	
6	Solar System parameters	Black-and-white text	
7	The Sun	Black-and-white image (Hale observatories)	
8	Solar spectrum	Color image	
9	Mercury	Black-and-white image	
10	Mars	Black-and-white image	Size
11	Jupiter	Color image	Size
12	Earth	Color image	Size
13	Egypt, Red Sea, Sinai Peninsula, and the Nile	Color image	Chemical composition
14	Chemical definitions	Black-and-white diagram	Size
15	DNA Structure	Color diagram	Size
16	DNA Structure magnified, light hit	Color diagram	Size
17	Cells and cell division	Black-and-white image (Turtox/Cambosco)	Size
18	Anatomy 1 (Skeleton front)	Color diagram (World Book)	
19	Anatomy 2 (Skeleton and muscles back)	Color diagram (World Book)	
20	Anatomy 3 (Heart, lungs, kidneys and main blood vessels back)	Color diagram (World Book)	
21	Anatomy 4 (Heart, lungs, kidneys and main blood vessels front)	Color diagram (World Book)	
22	Anatomy 5 (Internal organs back)	Color diagram (World Book)	
23	Anatomy 6 (Internal organs front)	Color diagram (World Book)	
24	Anatomy 7 (Ribcage)	Color diagram (World Book)	
25	Anatomy 8 (Muscles front)	Color diagram (World Book)	Size
26	Human sex organs	Black-and-white diagram (Sinauer Associates, Inc.)	Size
27	Diagram of conception	Black-and-white diagram	Size, time
28	Conception	Color image (Albert Bonniers; Forlag, Stockholm)	
29	Fertilized ovum	Black-and-white image (Albert Bonniers; Forlag, Stockholm)	Time
30	Fetus diagram	Black-and-white diagram	Size, time
31	Fetus	Color image (Dr. Frank Allan)	
32	Diagram of male and female	Black-and-white diagram	Size, time
33	Birth	Black-and-white image (Wayne Miller)	
34	Nursing mother (Philippines)	Color image	
35	Father and daughter (Malaysia)	Color image (David Harvey)	
36	Group of children	Color image (Ruby Mera, UNICEF)	
37	Diagram of family ages	Black-and-white diagram	Mass, time
38	Family portrait	Black-and-white image (by Nina Leen)	
39	Diagram of continental drift (derived from LAGEOS plaque)	Black-and-white diagram	Time
40	Structure of the Earth	Black-and-white diagram	Size, chemical composition
41	Heron Island (Great Barrier Reef of Australia)	Color image	
42	Seashore (Cape Neddick, Maine)	Color image (Dick Smith)	
43	Snake River and Grand Tetons	Black-and-white image (Ansel Adams)	
44	Sand dunes	Color image (George Mobley)	
45	Monument Valley	Color image (Shostal Associates, Inc.)	
46	Forest scene with mushrooms	Color image (Bruce Dale)	
47	Leaf (Fragaria)	Color image (Arthur Herrick)	Size
48	Autumn Fallen leaves	Color image (Jodi Cobb)	
49	Snowflakes over Sequoia	Color image (Josef Muench, R. Sisson)	
50	Tree with daffodils	Color image (Gardens Winterthur, Winterthur Museum, Garden and Library)	Size
51	Flying insect with flowers (Ichneumonidae)	Color image (Borne on the Wind, Stephen Dalton)	Size, mass
52	Diagram of vertebrate evolution	Black-and-white diagram	
53	Seashell (Xancidae)	Color image (Harry N. Abrams, Inc.)	
54	Dolphins	Color image (Thomas Nebbia)	
55	School of fish	Color image (David Doubilet)	
56	Tree toad	Color image (Dave Wickstrom)	
57	Crocodile	Color image (Peter Beard)	
58	Eagle	Color image (Donona, Taplinger Publishing Co)	Size
59	Waterhole	Color image (South African Tourist Corp.)	
60	Jane Goodall and chimps	Color image (Vanne Morris-Goodall)	
61	Sketch of bushmen	Black-and-white diagram	Size
62	Bushmen hunters	Black-and-white image (R. Farbman)	
63	Man from Guatemala	Color image	
64	Dancer from Bali	Color image (Donna Grosvenor)	
65	Andean girls	Color image (Joseph Scherschel)	
66	Thailand master craftsman	Color image (Dean Conger)	
67	Elephant	Color image (Peter Kunstadter)	
68	Old man with beard and glasses (Turkey)	Color image (Jonathon Blair)	
69	Old man with dog and flowers	Color image (Bruce Baumann)	
70	Mountain climber	Color image (Gaston Rébuffat)	
71	Gymnast (Cathy Rigby)	Color image (Philip Leonian, Sports Illustrated)	Time
72	Sprinters "Valeriy Borzov of the U.S.S.R. in lead"	Color image	
73	Schoolroom (Japan)	Color image	
74	Children with globe (United Nations International School)	Color image	
75	Cotton harvest	Color image (Howell Walker)	Size
76	Grape picker	Color image (David Moore)	
77	Supermarket	Color image (Jon Lomberg)	
78	Underwater scene with diver and fish	Color image (Jerry Greenberg)	Chemical composition
79	Fishing boat with nets (Greece)	Color image	
80	Cooking fish	Color image	
81	Chinese dinner party	Color image	
82	Demonstration of licking, eating and drinking	Color image	
83	Great Wall of China	Color image	
84	House construction (Cameroon)	Color image	
85	Construction scene (Amish country)	Color image	
86	House (Ethiopia)	Color image	
87	House (New England)	Color image	
88	Modern house (Cloudcroft, New Mexico)	Color image	
89	"House interior with artist and fire"	Color image (Photo by Jim Amos of Jim Gray & his wife)	
90	Taj Mahal	Color image (David Carroll)	
91	English city (Oxford)	Color image (C.S. Lewis, Images of His World, William B. Eerdmans Publishing Co.)	
92	Boston	Color image (Ted Spiegel)	
93	UN Building Day	Color image	
94	UN Building Night	Color image	
95	Sydney Opera House	Color image	Size
96	Artisan with drill	Black-and-white image (Frank Hewlett)	
97	Factory interior	Color image (Fred Ward)	
98	Museum	Color image (David Cupp)	
99	X-ray of hand	Color image	
100	Woman with microscope (Somalia)	Color image	
101	Street scene (Pakistan)	Color image	
102	Rush hour traffic (Thailand)	Color image	
103	Modern highway (Ithaca, New York)	Color image	
104	Golden Gate Bridge	Black-and-white image (Ansel Adams)	Size
105	Train (United Aircraft Corporation Turbotrain)	Color image (Gordon Gahan)	Size
106	Airplane in flight	Color image	
107	Airport (Toronto)	Black-and-white image (George Hunter)	
108	Antarctic expedition (Commonwealth Trans-Antarctic Expedition)	Color image (Great Adventures with the National Geographic, National Geographic)	
109	Radio telescope (Westerbork)	Black-and-white image (James Blair)	
110	Radio telescope (Arecibo)	Color image	Size
111	Page of book (Newton, On the System of the World)	Color image	
112	Astronaut in space (Ed White)	Color image (James McDivitt)	
113	Titan Centaur launch	Color image	
114	Sunset with birds	Color image (David Harvey)	
115	String Quartet (Quartetto Italiano)	Color image (Phillips Recordings)	
116	Violin with music score (Cavatina)	Color image	

== See also ==
- Communication with extraterrestrial intelligence
