= Javanese Court Gamelan =

Studio album by Pura Paku Alaman gamelan
- Released: 1971
- Recorded: January 10, 1971
- Genre: Gamelan
- Length: 47:34
- Label: Nonesuch Explorer Series/Elektra Records
- Producer: Teresa Sterne
- Compiler: Robert E. Brown

Robert E. Brown gamelan recordings chronology
Bali: Music from the Shadow Play (1970)	Javanese Court Gamelan (1971)	Javanese Court Gamelan, Vol. II (1977)

Alternative cover
- 1991 CD release

Alternative cover
- 2003 CD re-issue

Javanese Court Gamelan is a recording of the gamelan of the Paku Alaman court in Yogyakarta, Java, Indonesia. It was recorded by ethnomusicologist Robert E. Brown on January 10, 1971 and released on LP later the same year. The album was issued on compact disc on April 17, 1991 with the original contents. It was remastered and reissued under the name Java: Court Gamelan on January 28, 2003 with a cover of a photograph of Borobudur.

The gamelan in the recording is an heirloom gamelan, made in 1755 for Paku Alam I. The sléndro half, named Kyai Pengawé Sari ("Sir Invitation to Beauty"), is heard on tracks 1 and 3, while the pélog half, named Kyai Telaga Muntjar ("Sir Lake and Fountain"), is heard on tracks 2 and 4.

The recording was made in the reception hall of the Pura Paku Alaman, by permission of Paku Alam VIII, for a radio broadcast in honor of his birthday. The sounds of sparrows that make their nests in the hall and other ambient noises are considered normal.

The recording of Puspawarna was included on the Voyager Golden Record. The album was nominated for the Grammy Award for Best Ethnic or Traditional Folk Recording in the Grammy Awards of 1972.

== Track listing ==
1. "Ketawang Puspawarna" – 4:46
2. "Gending Tejanata / Ladrang Sembawa / Ladrang Playon" – 18:28
3. "Gending Mandulpati / Ladrang Agun-Agun" – 19:40
4. "Bubaran Hudan Mas" – 2:07

== Credits ==
- K.R.T. Wasitodiningrat, director
- Nyi Djiworetno, pesindhen
- Niken Larasati, pesindhen
- Nyi Tasri, pesindhen
