= Idlewild (novel) =

2003 novel by Nick Sagan

- First edition
- Author: Nick Sagan
- Language: English
- Genre: Science fiction
- Publisher: Putnam (US); Bantam Books (UK)
- Publication date: 2003
- Publication place: United States
- Media type: Print (hardback & paperback)
- Pages: 295
- ISBN: 0-399-15097-8
- OCLC: 51652945
- Dewey Decimal: 813/.6 21
- LC Class: PS3619.A36 I35 2003
- Followed by: Edenborn

Idlewild is a science fiction novel by American writer Nick Sagan, published in 2003. It is the first of a trilogy, with sequels Edenborn and Everfree. The story is split between two settings: the middle of the 21st century (told through interludes and distinguished from the main story by italics) and a generation later. It is a picture of the last ten people on earth, a near-complete pantheon of gods and goddesses.

== Plot ==
The backstory is revealed in interludes throughout the book. In the middle of the 21st century, a retrovirus called Black Ep renders all of humanity infertile and causes people to die. In the lab of a major German-American genetic research facility, a group of scientists is working on a project to save humanity by raising ten genetically altered children in immersive virtual reality. To test the efficiency of the software, one of the scientists, Halfway Jim, uses a program designed to be as close to a real child as possible, to run through the virtual lives the children will lead. Out of sentimentality, Jim's dying act is to integrate this program, which he names Malachi, into the virtual reality environment.

The main story follows one of the virtual "students," a young man named Halloween, who wakes up with total amnesia and must piece together what he can of the world around him. Halloween meets nine other students: Jasmine, Mercutio, Pandora, Simone, Isaac, Lazarus, Vashti, Tyler, Champagne, and Fantasia. Fan, Mercutio, Hal, and Tyler are known as the "clods," who misbehave, while Simone, Isaac, Lazarus, Vashti, Champagne, and Pan are the "pets," who study and follow all of the rules. The digital teacher of the school is named Maestro, but the clods call him Mae$tro (pronounced 'Maeshtro') and do not respect him. Each student is given a digital world that they may edit to their liking and a "Nanny," a digital being that can help a student with anything they need help with.

Mercutio asks Halloween if he'd like some food, and they decide to dine at the Taj Mahal. Mercutio begins to order a steak, but halfway through his order, the entire world freezes up. Mercutio has triggered a jammer so that he and Hal can escape the virtual world, and they both wake up in their beds in the school. They decide to visit their favorite diner, Twain's, and enjoy a nice meal before Merc decides to head back to IVR. Halloween calls his parents and reports that he is dropping out. After a long discussion with both his parents and Ellison, the school's headmaster, Halloween is sent back to the virtual world.

Halloween "graduates" all of the remaining students, waking them up from the virtual world. They decide to fulfill Gedaechtnis' plans for them to rebuild the world, but Halloween rejects the plan. The book ends with Halloween standing in the woods of Michigan, angry at the world for robbing him of his illusions, the girl he loved and his two best friends.

== Reception ==
Kirkus Reviews wrote that while the book "might seem a rather lumbering affair when laid out", it "nips along quite nicely, deftly sidestepping the overly drawn-out or too-fraught-with-meaning scenarios one might expect from this apocalyptic masquerade." Publishers Weekly wrote that "Despite a compelling twist near the middle, the low tension and meandering plot will likely frustrate the primary target audience, mainstream fans of such futuristic action films as The Matrix and Minority Report." Ann Kim of Library Journal wrote that despite "occasionally reading more like a drawn-out short story rather than a novel", the book is a "fine debut by a writer with potential to grow".

Sally Estes of Booklist wrote that Sagan "captures perfectly the voice and actions of a rebellious, extremely intelligent teenager." Gerald Jonas of The New York Times wrote that the book is "long on visuals, short on narrative logic and, surprisingly, weak on science."

== Sequels ==
A sequel, Edenborn, was published in 2004. A second sequel, Everfree, was published in May 2006.

== See also ==
- Simulated reality

== Bibliographical information ==
- ISBN 0-399-15097-8: U.S. Hardback (Putnam Publishing Group)
- ISBN 0-451-21206-1: U.S. Paperback (New American Library)
- ISBN 0-593-05190-4: UK Hardback (Bantam Press)
- ISBN 0-553-81597-0: UK Paperback (Bantam Press)
