= K. P. H. Notoprojo =

Indonesian musician

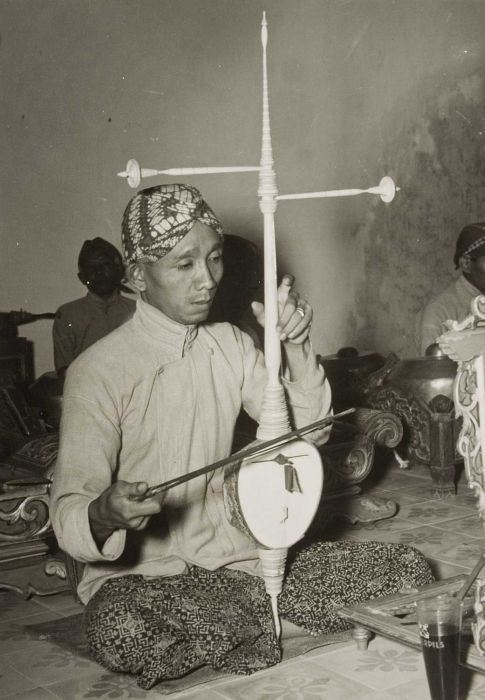
K. P. H. Notoprojo

Kanjeng Pangeran Harjo Notoprojo (Hanacaraka: ꦑꦤ꧀ꦗꦼꦁꦦꦔꦺꦫꦤ꧀ꦲꦂꦗꦟꦡꦦꦿꦗ), also known as Tjokrowasito, Wasitodipuro, Wasitodiningrat, among other names (March 17, 1909 – August 30, 2007), was one of the most highly respected performers of Javanese gamelan. He led the Paku Alaman palace gamelan as well as the gamelan for the Radio Republik Indonesia Yogyakarta, and taught gamelan in universities around the world. He was also a noted composer and rebab performer.

On March 9, 2004, he received the Nugraha Bhakti Musik Indonesia Award.

== Name ==
His official name changed several times, corresponding to honors received during his lifetime. He was born in Yogyakarta, Central Java, as Wasi Jolodoro. He was first called Tjokrowasito (Cokrowasito in the new orthography); and known familiarly as Pak Tjokro (Cokro). As he became musically proficient, his peers called him Ki Tjokrowasito (Ki is an unofficial title of respect). In the 1960s, the Paku Alaman Palace honored him with the name K.R.T. Wasitodipuro, or "Wasito of the palace; and the additional honorifics K.R.T., or Kanjeng Raden Tumenggung. Later, he was honored again to become K.R.T. Wasitodiningrat, "Wasito of the world." In 2001 he was recognized officially as the biological son of Paku Alam VII, and half-brother of the Paku Alam VIII. He was then given a title similar to a prince: K. P. H. Notoprojo, or Kanjeng Pangeran Haryo, which remained his name until the end of his life.

== Life ==
He was born in Yogyakarta, Java. He grew up in the Paku Alaman palace, and began studying gamelan at age five from his legal father, R.W. Padmowinangum, who led the palace gamelan. His formal education was at Taman Siswa secondary school, enriched by studies at the palace.

In addition to playing in the court gamelan, he played with other famous gamelan groups, such as Daya Pradangga. He served as gamelan musical director at the radio station MAVRO (Mataramsche Vereeniging Radio Omroep) from 1934, Radio Hosokyoku from 1942-1945 during the Japanese occupation of the Dutch East Indies, and RRI Yogyakarta after independence. He had the opportunity to teach karawitan abroad beginning in 1953, and worked in several countries. He taught at the Konservatori Tari Indonesia and Akademi Seni Tari Indonesia, and founded a school for the study of vocal music, Pusat Olah Vokal Wasitodipuro.

He assumed leadership of the Pura Pakualaman gamelan from his father in 1962. The musical style of the Pura Pakualaman had traditional shared elements of both the Yogyakarta Sultan's palace, and, influenced by intermarriage, with the Sunan's palace in Solo (Surakarta). Notoprojo, following extended residencies in Solo, furthered this process, perhaps to the point at which the style of the Pura Pakualaman could be heard as largely Solonese in character.

He composed music for the new genre of sendratari dance-drama in the 1960s, including the first performances held at the Lara Jonggrang temple complex in Prambanan. He collaborated with the choreographer Bagong Kussudiardjo. His over 250 compositions include numerous light gamelan pieces (lagu dolanan) and experimental works (kreasi baru), including many which are prominent in the gamelan repertoire. He revived several moribund or extinct art forms from Yogyakarta history, including wayang gedhog. Scores of his works, as well as a two-volume set of his notation for vocal music, are published by the American Gamelan Institute.

A recording of Puspawarna by the court gamelan of Paku Alaman, Yogyakarta, directed by K.R.T. Wasitodipuro (later known as K.P.H. Natoprojo) and recorded by Robert E. Brown was included on the Voyager Golden Record, which was sent on the Voyager 1 spacecraft as a greeting to whatever extraterrestrials may find it. The recording is also available on the album Java: Court Gamelan (originally released in 1971). According to the note by Brown in the reissued version of that CD, "Puspawarna" was one of Carl Sagan's favorites on the record.

He led the gamelan at the Indonesian Pavilion of the 1964 New York World's Fair. He moved to Valencia, California in 1971 and taught at the California Institute of the Arts until 1992, in addition to work at University of California, Berkeley, San Jose State University, and many other universities in the US and Canada. In 1992 he retired and returned to Indonesia. His home is both a residence for young artists, and a site of regular performances and gatherings of some of Java's best gamelan artists.

He died in Yogyakarta on August 30, 2007, at the age of 104 in the reckoning of years in the Javanese calendar. He was instrumental in spreading the appreciation and knowledge of Javanese gamelan around the world. According to Mantle Hood, "It is accepted that no other Indonesian has even approached the contributions of this man in helping the world know the great gamelan traditions of Java."

== Recordings ==
=== As performer/director ===
- Javanese Court Gamelan, released on Nonesuch Records, 1971 (reissued 2003). A portion of "Puspawarna" from this record is included on the Voyager Golden Record attached to the Voyager spacecraft, put together by Carl Sagan and others.

=== Compositions ===
- The music of K.R.T. Wasitodiningrat, performed by Gamelan Sekar Tunjung, released on CMP Records, 1994.

== Writings and notation ==
- Javanese Vocal Notation, a collection of notation for male voices (gerong) and female voices (pesindhen) for nearly 300 pieces, written in his own hand during the years he taught at California Institute of the Arts. Several of the piece are his own compositions. The collection was started by Leslie Dono Isworo, and edited by Jody Diamond with assistance from I.M. Harjito and Djoko Waluyo, with an introduction by Alex Dea and Laurie Kottmeyer. Both the slendro and pelog volumes of vocal notation, as well as a collection of his compositions, are available for download in the library of the American Gamelan Institute.
