= Puspawarna =

Gamelan composition

Puspawarna (ꦥꦸꦱ꧀ꦥꦮꦂꦤ; Javanese for "kinds of flowers") is a gamelan composition famous in Central Java. It is a ketawang in slendro pathet manyura. Thus the full title of the piece often given as Ketawang Puspawarna Laras Slendro Pathet Manyura. Manyura, the final pathet in a wayang performance, is said to evoke a mood of ripeness or fulfillment.

Both text and melody are attributed to Prince Mangkunegara IV of Surakarta (reigned 1853–1881). The nine stanzas commemorate his favorite wives and concubines, who are likened to different kinds of flowers, each symbolizing a different rasa: kencur, blimbing, duren, aren, gedhang, jati, jambé, kapas, and pandan. The piece is performed for the entrance of the prince both at the Mangkunegaran and at central Java's other junior court, the Paku Alaman.

A recording of Puspawarna by the court gamelan of Paku Alaman, Yogyakarta, directed by K.R.T. Wasitodipuro (later known as K.P.H. Natoprojo) and recorded by Robert E. Brown was included on the Voyager Golden Record, which was sent on the Voyager 1 and Voyager 2 spacecraft as a greeting to whatever extraterrestrials may find it. The recording is also available on the album Java: Court Gamelan (originally released in 1971). According to the note by Brown in the reissued version of that CD, "Puspawarna" was one of Carl Sagan's favorites on the record.
