= Edenborn =

2004 novel by Nick Sagan

- First edition cover
- Author: Nick Sagan
- Language: English
- Genre: Science fiction
- Publisher: Penguin Books (USA)
- Publication date: 2004
- Publication place: United States
- Media type: Print (hardback & paperback)
- Pages: 336
- ISBN: 0-399-15186-9
- OCLC: 54960616
- Preceded by: Idlewild
- Followed by: Everfree

Edenborn is a 2004 science fiction novel by American writer Nick Sagan. It is the sequel to Idlewild, and takes place 18 years after that book. The sequel to this book and the final installment of the trilogy is Everfree.

== Plot summary ==
In the aftermath of a global plague and the death of all humans, a group of genetically altered posthumans raised in IVR, or Immersive Virtual Reality, are trying to rebuild society by cloning children. They're divided into two ideological factions, the rest being politically indifferent.

Vashti and Champagne's group in Munich, Germany, have formed a school in the Nymphenburg Palace for Posthuman children they've created, invulnerable to Black Ep because of genetically boosted immune systems. Due to the fact that females have a slightly stronger resistance to Black Ep and Vashti's belief in matriarchy, all the children are female. Nymphenburg is very structured, most of the children's time being rigidly scheduled. Vashti feels that humanity should be improved upon via genetic engineering, and leads most of the scientific aspects of Nymphenburg. Champagne is mostly responsible for taking care of the children, supplies, and gardening. The Nymphenburg children include fifteen-year-old Penelope, Sloane, and Tomi.

Isaac's group is based in Luxor, Egypt, which he has renamed Thebes, and is structured more like a traditional family. His children consist of both females and males, and are unaltered humans. Thebes is Sufi Muslim, and a more relaxed environment than Nymphenburg. They're protected from Black Ep by a retrovirus called BEAR. The Thebes children include Hessa, sixteen-year-old Mu'tazz and fifteen-year-old Haji. Though both camps survived Black Ep, both still work to cure it. The two camps have a short-term exchange program despite their incompatibility and the death of Hessa in a previous exchange.

The other three posthumans are either neutral or uninvolved in this debate. Pandora runs infrastructure repair and IVR, computer-generated virtual reality used as a school and hobby for the children in Nymphenburg. Halloween lives alone in North America, and opposes the very idea of repopulating Earth. The only person he'll speak to is Pandora. Fantasia is somewhere in North America as well, even more isolated than Halloween.

Haji is included in the exchange with Nymphenburg with two of his siblings, Ngozi and Dalila. Raised without some of the technology they use, Haji is delighted by it, but feels a certain unease. Vashti monitors all of their dealings and domains in IVR, and has it strictly censored. Vashti also controls the girls through virtual dollars given as pocket money, used to buy things in IVR.

Penny, the main character of the Munich base, showns signs of narcissism. She considers herself the best of her siblings, regarding them with either hatred or pity. She also believes she has the ability to "hex" people, crediting herself with the injury of her sister. When she hears that Pandora has become overworked and may need an assistant, she puts all her energy into getting the position, even bribing or blackmailing her sisters to convince Pandora to hire her. Penny wants to be "queen of the inside" by controlling IVR, thereby controlling her sisters.

Many small items with no history or sender keep ending up in IVR. Penny finds the yin half of a yin-yang symbol and Haji finds a key. Tomi, his friend, recognizes it as the key to the cryonics lab where she assists Vashti. Tomi sneaks him in, realizing that he is a clone of IVR programmer Dr. James Hyoguchi. She shows Haji a recording from James telling him to "download" James' mapped brain, destroying himself in the process. Haji is terrified, and as the disc ends Vashti finds him and Tomi. After repeatedly asking him who sent him the key, she is sympathetic, advising him not to sacrifice himself. Haji is overwhelmed, feeling betrayed by his father and wondering whether he should go through with it. His religion stresses the ultimate path to God as self-annihilation through fana. He wonders if his father's intentions in raising him to believe this were to get him to accept his death. Haji calls Isaac while he's on an expedition with Pandora asking him if he was in fact designed to be a conduit for James. Isaac tells him that this is not the case, and that he should disregard the disc.

In a diary entry, Penny reveals that Hessa's death was caused by her switching pills out with laxatives as a prank. When her plan to become Pandora's assistant fails, she flies into a rage, making a list of people she wants revenge upon.

Just after Haji calls his father and Penny makes out her hit list, there is a massive IVR security breach. Everything is exposed, including Vashti's logs and evaluations of the girls that reveal a range of mood-suppressing drugs—including sex-drive suppressants—and subliminal codes that the Munich camp use to keep their children in line, as well as the reading of the girls' supposedly secret diaries. Penny's ego is shattered by the revelation that she is considered beneath her sisters. Vashti is furious and the girls are outraged. The attack is traced back to Halloween. However, it was really organized by someone named Deuce, who was also behind the mysterious objects.

Meanwhile, Pandora is tracking monkeys in the Amazon in the hopes of discovering how they survived Black Ep. The group captures a primate, but Mu'tazz, a human boy on the expedition, suddenly becomes extremely ill, and the group rushes to Nymphenburg for medical care. During the flight, Vashti calls Pandora, demanding she confront Halloween.

During Pandora and Halloween's conversation, Halloween reveals that he cloned himself shortly after escaping IVR, hoping for the clone to be a better person. However, he did not replicate Halloween's choices, and Hal realized that he was not the same. He pulled him out of IVR when he was five years old, named him Deuce, and raised him as his son. Halloween largely approves of Deuce exposing Vashti and Champagne. Deuce, Halloween, and Pandora agree to fly Deuce to Munich, Deuce and Halloween mostly seeing it as an opportunity for Deuce to meet new people, but Vashti intending to "make an example of him".

Halloween travels to Munich to find his son, and makes a certain amount of peace with his former classmates.

Deuce and Penelope go to a deserted Britain, and begin a 'last couple on Earth' fantasy. The pair go to an air force base and acquire weaponry. After they accidentally shoot down Pandora over the Mediterranean, they travel to Munich with a rocket launcher. Deuce does not want to actually go through with it, hoping to distract her until they're either caught or Penny sees reason. When Penny tells Deuce to fire the rocket launcher at the headquarters where everyone else is, Deuce refuses. Penny takes the rocket launcher herself and prepares to fire it. Halloween shoots her. Deuce commits suicide, with his idea of his father shattered.

In the aftermath, the various leaders realize that all their problems came from division. They all move to Munich, where they begin to build, hopefully, a better world.

== Reception ==
F&SF reviewer Robert. K. J. Killheffer described the novel as a "competent but not particularly original [take] on familiar sf scenarios," distinguished from the routine by Sagan's "sympathetic treatment of religious faith." Jon Courtenay Grimwood, writing for The Guardian wrote that the book is "better written and even more tightly plotted" than Idlewild. Publishers Weekly wrote that Sagan's "sharp observations" and "rich imagination" both entertain and "lay a strong groundwork for volume three".

Kirkus Reviews wrote that while the book was not "quite as awe-inspiring" as Idlewild, it is still a "rich fantasia, peopled by painfully real characters." Sally Estes of Booklist called the book "gripping". Andrew Leonard of The New York Times wrote that the book's world "feels fake" and has "little genuine flavor", and also criticised the development of the characters, writing that only one of the characters "feels nastily fleshed out".
