= Frederick Ahl =

American classical scholar

- Ahl in 2016
- Born: September 5, 1941
- Died: January 27, 2025 (aged 83); Rochester, New York, United States

Academic background
- Education: University of Cambridge; University of Texas

Academic work
- Discipline: Classical studies
- Sub-discipline: Classical literature
- Institutions: Texas Military Institute; Trinity University; University of Texas at Austin; University of Utah; Cornell University

Frederick Michael Ahl (September 5, 1941 – January 27, 2025) was an American classical scholar who was professor of classics and comparative literature at Cornell University. He was known for his work in Greek and Roman epic and drama, and the intellectual history of Greece and Rome, as well as for translations of tragedy and Latin epic.

== Studies ==
Ahl studied classics at Cambridge University, where he received bachelor's and master's degrees, and at the University of Texas, where he received his doctorate.

== Career ==
Ahl taught at the Texas Military Institute, Trinity University, the University of Texas at Austin, and the University of Utah before he joined the Cornell faculty in 1971. He recorded messages in Ancient Greek, Latin, and Welsh for the Voyager Golden Record that was included with the launch of both Voyager spacecraft in 1977.

He was awarded the Clark Award for Distinguished Teaching by Cornell in 1977 and a fellowship by the National Endowment for the Humanities in 1989-90 and was a Stephen H. Weiss Presidential Fellow in 1996. In 1996–1999 and 2000–2001 he taught literature (Attic Tragedy) and Classical Languages as visiting professor at College Year in Athens, a study abroad program in Athens. He later served as director of Cornell Abroad in Greece.

In 2013, Ahl was honored with a conference at Cornell entitled Speaking to Power in Latin and Greek Literature, and in 2016 with a related festschrift, Wordplay and Powerplay in Latin Poetry.

He was active in theater in Ithaca, including Cornell Savoyards' Gilbert and Sullivan productions. He died on January 27, 2025, in Rochester, New York.

== Works ==
In addition to his several books, Ahl published articles on topics including ancient Greek music, Homeric narrative, rhetoric in antiquity, and Latin poetry of the Roman imperial period.

In 1985 Ahl published Metaformations: Soundplay and Wordplay in Ovid and Other Classical Poets. In his 1991 book Sophocles' Oedipus: Evidence and Self-Conviction, he argues that the Oedipus of Sophocles' play is not actually guilty; Oedipus' conclusion that he is guilty is not actually confirmed by the information in the play itself, and the audience's belief in Oedipus' guilt is based on the audience's outside knowledge of the myth.

In 2007, Ahl published a translation of Virgil's Aeneid into English hexameter, which was republished in paperback in 2008. He was the editor of the series of translations under the rubric "Masters of Latin Literature".

== Bibliography ==
=== Translations ===
- Phaedra (1986) ISBN 0-8014-9433-8
- Trojan Women (1986) ISBN 0-8014-9431-1
- Medea (1986) ISBN 0-8014-9432-X
- Aeneid (2007), with Elaine Fantham ISBN 0-19-283206-9

=== Scholarship and criticism ===
- Lucan: An Introduction (1976) ISBN 0-8014-0837-7
- Metaformations: Soundplay and Wordplay in Ovid and Other Classical Poets (1985) ISBN 0-8014-1762-7
- Sophocles' Oedipus: Evidence and Self Conviction (1991) ISBN 0-8014-2558-1 (hardcover), ISBN 0-8014-9929-1 (paperback)
- Seneca: Three Tragedies;
- 'Statius' Thebaid: A Reconsideration' in Aufstieg und Niedergang der römischen Welt 2.32.5 (1986) 2803–2912.
- The Odyssey Re-Formed, Cornell Studies in Classical Philology (1996), with Hanna Roisman
- Two Faces of Oedipus: Sophocles' Oedipus Tyrannus and Seneca's Oedipus
- "The Rider and the Horse: Poetry and Politics in Roman Poetry from Horace to Statius", in Joseph Vogt, ed. Aufstieg und Niedergang der römischen Welt (Rome: de Gruyter) 1972, pp 40–111.
