= Fredy Roncalla =

Peruvian poet and artisan (born 1953)

- Born: Fredy Amílcar Roncalla Fernández; 1953 (age 72–73); Chalhuanca, Apurímac, Peru
- Education: Pontifical Catholic University of Peru
- Occupations: poet, artisan
- Writing career
- Language: Quechua, Spanish
- Genre: poetry

Fredy Amílcar Roncalla Fernández (born 1953) is a Peruvian-born Quechua-language writer and artisan.

== Life and career ==
Roncalla studied at the Pontifical Catholic University of Peru in Lima, and then migrated to the United States to work at Cornell University in Ithaca, New York. While at Cornell, Roncalla's voice was included in NASA's Voyager Golden Record, a time-capsule project chaired by professor and scientist Carl Sagan.

He lives and writes in the New York metropolitan area where he also has established his artisan work.

Additionally, Roncalla is an executive council member of Chirapaq, Indigenous-lead organization in Peru.

== Publications ==
- Canto de Pájaro o invocación a la palabra (Buffon Press, 1984)
- Escritos Mitimaes: hacia una poética andina postmoderna (Barro Editorial Press, 1989)
- Hawansuyo Ukun Words (Pakarina Ediciones/Hawansuyo, 2015)
- Revelación en la senda del Manzanar: Homenaje a Juan Ramírez Ruiz (Pakarina Ediciones/Hawansuyo, 2016).

== See also ==
- List of American poets
- List of people from New York (state)
- List of Peruvian writers
