= Everfree =

2006 science fiction novel by Nick Sagan

- First edition
- Author: Nick Sagan
- Cover artist: Andrea Ho
- Language: English
- Genre: Science fiction
- Publisher: Putnam
- Publication date: May 2006
- Publication place: United States
- Media type: Print (hardback & paperback)
- Preceded by: Edenborn

Everfree is a science fiction novel by American writer Nick Sagan, published in 2006. It is the sequel to Edenborn and the final installment of this trilogy.

== Plot summary ==
A plague has wiped out most of humanity. The only ones that have survived are the genetically engineered "posthumans" and a group of wealthy people that preserved themselves cryogenically.

== Reception ==
- The New York Times states the book would've been better if he stayed with the character Hal as the narrator, and not mostly relied on others they called "flakier"
- Publishers Weekly states "so much is going on and flying off in so many directions, that the book finally reads like a tantalizing summary of a really interesting novel."
