= Nick Sagan =

American novelist and screenwriter (born 1970)

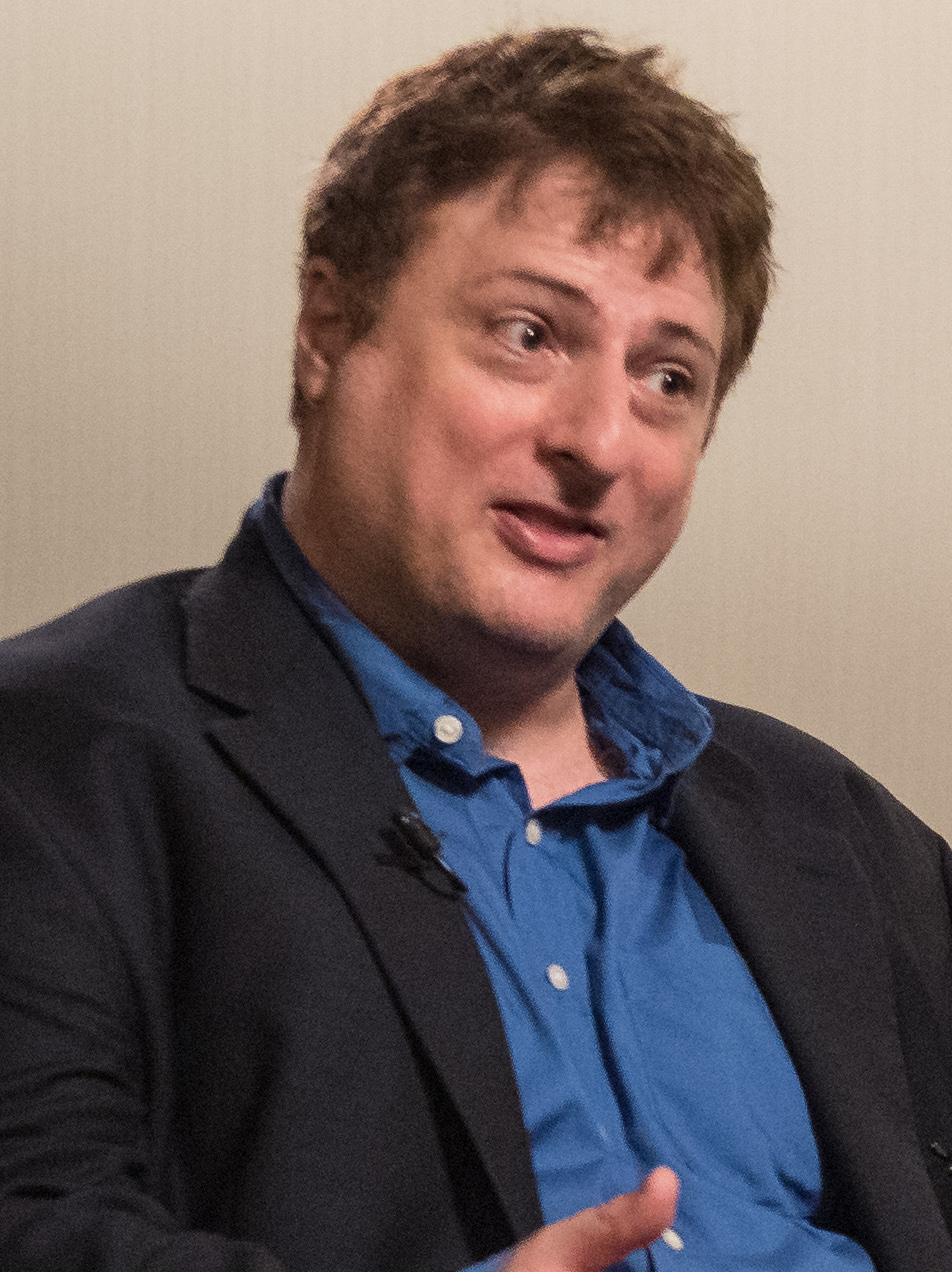
- Sagan in 2018
- Born: Nicholas Julian Zapata Sagan; September 16, 1970 (age 56); Boston, Massachusetts, U.S.
- Education: University of California, Los Angeles
- Occupations: Novelist; screenwriter
- Notable work: Idlewild; Edenborn; Everfree
- Parents: Carl Sagan (father); Linda Salzman (mother)
- Relatives: Dorion Sagan (half-brother); Sasha Sagan (half-sister)

A child's greeting (the voice of Nick Sagan at age six) in English recorded on the Voyager Golden Record

Nicholas Julian Zapata Sagan (born September 16, 1970) is an American novelist and screenwriter. He is the author of the science fiction novels Idlewild, Edenborn, and Everfree, and has also written scripts for episodes of Star Trek: The Next Generation and Star Trek: Voyager. He is the son of astronomer Carl Sagan and artist and writer Linda Salzman.

== Life ==
At age six, Sagan's greeting, "Hello from the children of planet Earth," was recorded and placed aboard NASA's Voyager Golden Record. Launched with a selection of terrestrial greetings, sights, sounds and music, the Voyager 1 and Voyager 2 spacecraft are now the most distant man-made objects in the universe, with Voyager 1 having left the Solar System on August 25, 2012, being the first to do so. Sagan went to the Mirman School as a child and received his bachelor's degree from the University of California, Los Angeles.

Sagan has been writing for Hollywood since 1992, crafting screenplays, teleplays, animation episodes and computer games. He has two older brothers; his brother Dorion is a science writer. He has worked for a variety of studios and production companies, including Paramount, Warner Brothers, New Line, Universal, Disney, actor/producer Tom Cruise, and directors David Fincher and Martin Scorsese.

Sagan co-wrote the award-winning computer adventure game, Zork Nemesis: The Forbidden Lands. His film credits include adaptations of novels by Orson Scott Card, Ursula K. Le Guin, Pierre Ouellette and Charles Pellegrino. His television credits include two episodes of Star Trek: The Next Generation and five episodes of Star Trek: Voyager, where he worked as a story editor.

At the turn of the millennium, astronaut Sally Ride recruited him to work for SPACE.com as Executive Producer of Entertainment & Games. During his tenure at SPACE.com, the inspiration for a series of novels came to Sagan, and he sold the Idlewild Trilogy to Penguin Putnam in 2002.

Idlewild received a starred review from Kirkus, a Book Sense 76 pick, and selection from both Borders and Barnes & Noble as one of the best science fiction/fantasy novels of the year. Neil Gaiman called it "absolutely fun, like a roller-coaster ride of fusion fiction" and "the kind of book you simply don't want to stop reading."

Edenborn continues the story from Idlewild (however it can also be read as a standalone). SFX Magazine gave Edenborn a perfect five star review, declaring it "one of the best post-apocalyptic novels you will ever read." SF Crowsnest hailed Sagan as "an adrenaline shot straight into the heart of science fiction," while SF Site called the novel "elegant SF, dark and haunting, with characters who linger in memory long after the last page is turned."

The series' third instalment, Everfree, was praised by Sci Fi Weekly as being "startlingly original" and "undeniably satisfying and triumphant." Kirkus remarked that "Sagan's mind-blowing post-apocalyptic trilogy comes to a satisfying, terrifying conclusion." They went on to hail the book as "a powerful plea for sensible human cooperation delivered via a knockout story."

Sagan taught screenwriting at Cornell University in the spring of 2007. He currently teaches screenwriting at Ithaca College. Both institutions are in Ithaca, New York.

== Works ==
=== Novels ===
- Idlewild (2003)
- Edenborn (2004)
- Everfree (2006)

=== Short stories ===
- "Tees and Sympathy" in Subterranean #4 (2006)

=== Television credits ===
- Star Trek: Voyager (1998-1999)
  - "In the Flesh"
  - "Gravity" with Bryan Fuller
  - "Course: Oblivion" with Bryan Fuller
  - "Juggernaut" with Kenneth Biller & Bryan Fuller
  - "Relativity" with Bryan Fuller & Michael Taylor
- Captain Simian & The Space Monkeys (1996)
  - "Gormongous!"
- Exosquad (1995)
  - "A Night Before Doomsday" with Mark Edens
- Space Precinct (1995)
  - "Predator and Prey"
- Star Trek: The Next Generation (1993-1994)
  - "Attached"
  - "Bloodlines"
- Jack's Place (1993)
  - "The Seventh Meal" with Linda Salzman

=== Games ===
- OurColony (2005)
- Zork: Nemesis (1996) with Cecilia Barajas and Adam Simon
