= Frederick N. Ward =

American photojournalist 1935–2016)

Frederick N. Ward (July 16, 1935 – July 19, 2016) was an American photojournalist whose work has appeared in many major international publications, and is on display in the Metropolitan Museum of Art, the Library of Congress, the International Center of Photography, and the Voyager spacecraft.

== History ==
Ward was born in Huntsville, Alabama and at age 13 left with his family for Miami, Florida, where his hobby of photography was encouraged by his teacher at Coral Gables Senior High School. In his second year of college, he had work experience at the Miami Daily News, where he met Charlotte. They studied together at the University of Florida. They married. She became a teacher. They learned SCUBA diving at Ginnie Springs, where he experimented with underwater photography.

In 1990, he observed coral bleaching in the Gulf of Mexico, and considered it a greater problem than was portrayed in an article he read in National Geographic.

He wrote a book about home birthing. He developed an interest in gemstones, and published several books on the subject. He earned a Graduate Gemology certificate from the Gemological Institute of America.

The cause of his death was Alzheimer's disease.
