= Robert E. Brown =

American ethnimusicologist (1927–2005)

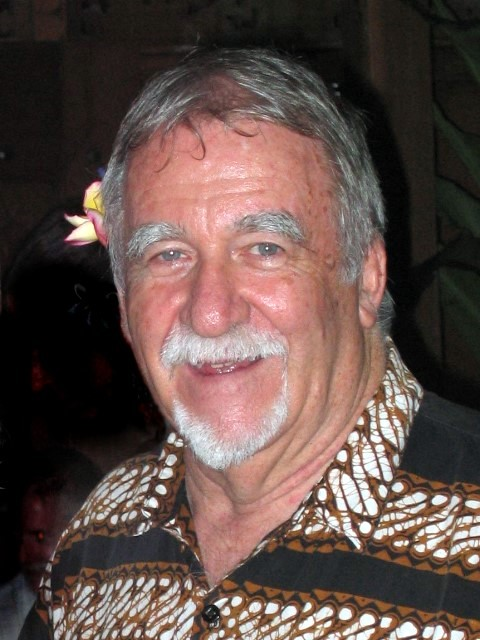
Bob Brown circa 2004

Robert Edward Brown (18 April 1927 – 29 November 2005) was an American ethnomusicologist who is credited with coining the term "world music". He was also well known for his recordings of music from Indonesia. Many of these recordings, among the first widely distributed and commercially available in the United States, inspired a generation of musicians to study and perform Indonesian gamelan music.

== Biography ==
Brown was born in Utica, New York and grew up in Clinton, New York. He had a very extensive background in music while still young. He played timpani and bass drum in a band, double bass and cello in the school orchestra and accompanied the school chorus on piano. A sponsor enabled him to study music theory at the Utica Conservatory with Johannes Magendanz and study piano with Clara Magendanz. He performed the first movement of the Schumann piano concerto with the high school orchestra during his sophomore year.

The same year, he held the job of organist at Hamilton College. He also performed popular music with his own band, Bobby Brown and His Swingsters. During his undergraduate years at Ithaca College and his graduate studies at Cornell University he continued to work as an organist.

Brown started his doctoral studies at UCLA as a piano major in 1953. After Mantle Hood began teaching at UCLA the following year, Brown switched to ethnomusicology and became Hood's first teaching assistant. Brown received his doctorate in ethnomusicology from UCLA. His dissertation was titled The Mrdanga: A Study of Drumming in South India (1965). He studied and played the mridangam.

Brown taught at Wesleyan University from 1961 until 1971. With David P. McAllester, he co-founded the world music/ethnomusicology program at Wesleyan. It was here that Brown first used the term "world music" to describe the ethnomusicology program.

Brown followed the philosophy advocated by Mantle Hood, who could be considered the father of gamelan music education in the USA: that students become bi-musical. Bob Brown's own "World Music" programs from the 1960s onwards were built on the ideal of bi-musicality, which was an innovative approach to music education at the time. It proposed that students, after acquiring competence in the music of their native culture, study with master musicians from another culture, and thereby acquire competence in the musical performance and theory of that culture too. The result would be a person with musical competence in two cultures: bi-musicality.

Brown was one of the organizers of the American Society for Eastern Arts (ASEA). In 1973, he established the Center for World Music in Berkeley, California, and remained president of this organization until his death. Thinking about how much musical experience was available to him in high school motivated him to start the "Music in the Schools program" for the Center for World Music.

In 1977, NASA launched the space probe Voyager with a gold-plated copper record featuring sounds and images of life and culture on Earth. Working with Carl Sagan, Brown chose a recording of the gamelan composition Puspawarna from Java: Court Gamelan to represent Southeast Asia. He also recommended the recording "Jaat Kahan Ho" in Raga Bhairavi by Surashri Kesarbai Kerkar for inclusion on the Voyager disc, since he believed it to be the finest recorded example of Indian classical music.

Brown began teaching at San Diego State University in 1979. He served as the Chair of the School of Music for three years from 1979 to 1982. He retired in 1992. Brown also was the owner of Girikusuma or Flower Mountain, a center for traditional Balinese performing arts located in Bali.

In 2006, the University of Illinois Urbana-Champaign announced that Brown had bequeathed his extensive collection of instruments, recordings, books, paintings and artifacts and to the school's world music center. The Robert E. Brown Center for World Music, which opened in April 2008, was named in his honor.

== Recordings ==
Brown produced five of the early recordings from Indonesia in the "Explorer Series" released on Nonesuch Records. Two of the recordings were from Bali, and three were from Java:

- Bali: Gamelan Semar Pegulingan
- Bali: Music from the Shadow Play, music from a wayang performance
- Java: Court Gamelan (1971). Grammy-nominated
- Java: Court Gamelan, Volume II (1977)
- Java: Court Gamelan, Volume III (1979)
