= Yamudi =

Double reed vertical flute or pipe

Yamudi (鴨母笛, 鸭母哒仔, or Taiwan guan 台湾管), is the native guan (double reed pipe) used in Taiwanese traditional music. The instrument, which translated means "mother duck flute" is very simple, as it primarily uses a large partially flattened tube reed connected to a thin cylindrical pipe (which may or may not have a small brass bell). Similar to the southern Chinese luguan and houguan, it is made of bamboo instead of hardwood and uses a softer reed, giving it a more nasal buzzing sound than that of the northern Chinese guanzi which is made from hardwood with a harder reed. This design also limits the instrument to a little more than an octave in range, since it cannot overblow like the guanzi. It is primarily used in Taiwanese opera for its somber sound. Although native to Taiwan, it is becoming an increasingly popular instrument in China as well.

The Yamudi is also a close relative of the Korean piri, the Japanese hichiriki (two instruments that it shares a similar timbre to) and a more distant relative of the Armenian duduk, and the Turkish mey.
