= Balaban (instrument) =

Wind instrument

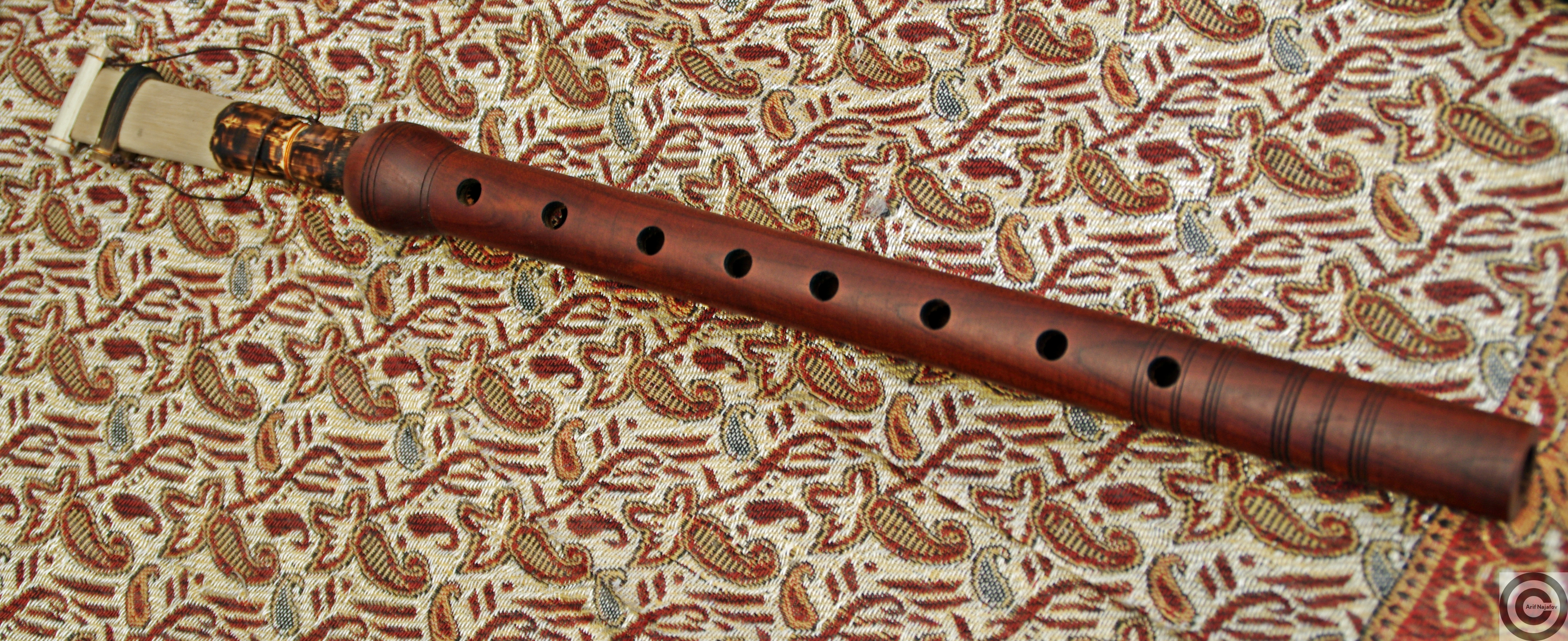
- Azerbaijani folk instrument Balaban

Woodwind instrument
- Classification: Double reed

Playing range
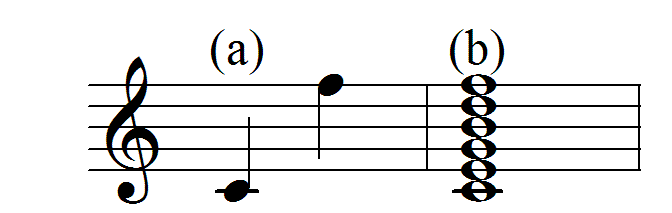

Related instruments
- Closely related instruments include the Mey (Turkey), Yasti Balaban (Dagestan), Duduki (Georgia), Duduk (Armenia), Hichiriki (Japan), Piri (Korea), Guanzi (China), and Kamis Sirnay (Kyrgyzstan)

Musicians
- Alihan Samedov, Alakbar Asgarov, Shirzad Fataliyev, Mehdi Nazarli, Nariman Shahbuzlu, Rehman Rasimoghlu, Rasim Elesgerov, Babahan Amirov, Shahram Sadiqov, Kamil Jalilov, Parviz Alikramoghlu, Tahri Mammadov, Hakim Abdullayev

Builders
- Mammadnaib Hajiyev, Abbas Ismayilov, Misirhan Isayev

Craftsmanship and performing art of balaban/mey
- UNESCO Intangible Cultural Heritage
- Country: Azerbaijan and Turkey
- Reference: 01704
- Region: Europe and North America

Inscription history
- Inscription: 2023 (18th session)
- List: Representative

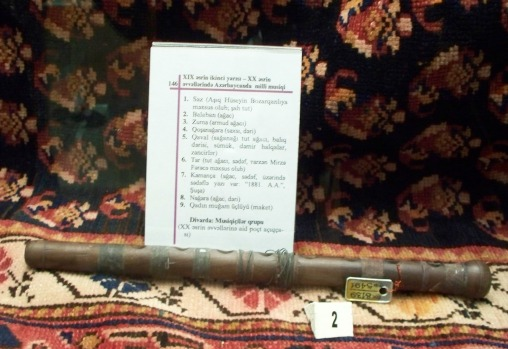
Balaban in Azerbaijan State Museum of History

The balaban or balaman (Azerbaijani: Balaban) is a double-reed pipe with cylindrical bore, about 35 centimetres (14 in) in length, with eight finger holes and one thumb hole, which is played in the eastern part of Iran's historic Azerbaijan region as well as in the Republic of Azerbaijan (where it is also called düdük, according to the Encyclopædia Iranica). The Azeri balaban, the Turkish mey, and the Armenian duduk are almost identical, except for historical and geographical differences.

Balaban can be made of mulberry or other harder woods, such as walnut. The bore through the instrument is about 1.5 centimetres (0.59 in) in diameter. The double reed is made out of a single tube of cane about six cm long and pressed flat at one end. The performer uses air stored in his cheeks to keep playing the balaban while he inhales air into his lungs. This “circular” breathing technique is commonly used with all the double-reed instruments in the Middle East.

Balaban can be found in regions of the Republic of Azerbaijan, Iran and Turkey. It is sometimes used as Balaman, Mey or Whistle, among Azerbaijan and Turkistan in the West Azerbaijan region.

Consisting of a body (govda) and a large double reed, the balaban measures between 28 and 30 cm in length and 20–22 mm in diameter. The sound is dull and light, and because it is weak, it is mostly played in closed spaces and room meetings. Thanks to the clamp on the reed, the sound can be thinned and thickened. The cane, flattened by a special method, consists of a clamp and a body. By pushing the grapple upwards or downwards on the reed, one-curtain sound change can be made and it can adapt to the instrument groups immediately. Another type of Balaban is used in ashiq music. Alihan Samedov is a famous Azerbaijani balaban artist.

== Structure ==
Balaban, which is often called also yasti (flat) balaban for flat mouthpiece and soft sound, consists of body made of apricot wood, cane, barrow and cover. The body has 8 holes on the surface and 1 on the back in the middle of the first and second holes (sound fret) on the surface. It consists of a stem, a reed, a regulator, and a cap.

The stem of the balaban, or govda, is a 280–320 millimetres (11–13 in) cylindrical tube made primarily of apricot wood (sometimes hazel, pear, mulberry, boxwood, etc.). The process of carving a balaban stem is called balaban chakma. The upper end of the stem (bash or kup) is given a round shape, whereas the lower end (ayag) is sharpened. The bore is 10 millimetres (0.39 in) in diameter. Eight holes or "tones" constituting a "sound tone" (sas pardasi) are made on the obverse and another one is made on the bottom side, opposite of the interval between the first and the second holes of the sas pardasi. Sometimes an additional hole called nizam pardasi is made on the lower end of the bottom side to ensure good timbre.

The holes made on the stem are classified as follows:

Sound tone– sas pardasi	Functional	#1 – first tone– bash parda
Sound tone– sas pardasi	Functional	#4 – main tone – shah parda
Sound tone– sas pardasi	Functional	#6 – open tone– achyg parda
Sound tone– sas pardasi	Functional	#8 – bottom tone– ayag parda
Sound tone– sas pardasi	Functional	rear – back tone– arkha parda
Sound tone– sas pardasi	Tonal	#2 – tone of segah – segah pardasi (1)
Sound tone– sas pardasi	Tonal	#5 – tone of segah – segah pardasi (2)
Sound tone– sas pardasi	Tonal	#7 – tone of mahur – mahur pardasi
Sound tone– sas pardasi	Acoustic	bottom – tone of balance – nizam pardasi

The reed (gamish, garghy or dil) made of club-rush that grows in an arid area is inserted into the upper end. It flattens and takes the shape of a double reed. It is tied to a 60 millimetres (2.4 in) long and 10 millimetres (0.39 in) wide regulator (kharak, boghazlig, boyundurug, ulama, akma) made of a willow or grape branch cut lengthways. The reed is then fixed by a collar-like regulator on one side and a 7–12 millimetres (0.28–0.47 in) pivot on the other side. The cap (qapaq, aghizlig, kip, band, etc.) made of willow, hazel, cornel or mulberry is put on the reed to prevent it from damage. It is tied to the regulator in order not to be lost.

== History ==
In the region; Balaman is also called Yasla Balaman, flat Balaman.

- Balaman in Black Hearts.

Balaban first used in Azerbaijan orchestra since 1931, when the Folk Instrument Orchestra was established in Azerbaijan. It is used to accompany songs in Turkmen and Kurdish cities such as Erbil, Süleymaniye, Kirkuk. Balaban, which has a warm sonority, is often used as a companion to the songs of heaven and bendir and Aşık. Kudüm and defle can also perform a duet, and are also performed solo. 2 The balaban plays together, while someone gives a sound, and someone plays the melody. It has origin in Caucuses and has been adopted by Azerbaijani music.

== Use ==
On solemn occasions such as weddings and holiday ceremonies, a balaban-player is accompanied by a percussionist. A traditional Azeri musical group consisting of two balaban-players and a percussionist is called balabanchilar dastasi. The short selection of Azerbaijani mugham played in balaban, national wind instrument was included on the Voyager Golden Record, attached to the Voyager spacecraft as representing world music, included among many cultural achievements of humanity. It was also used in pastoral songs and funeral music. According to Huseyngulu Sarabski, hunters played the balaban to attract quails. Certain types of the balaban are also used in ashik music.

== Legacy ==
Kamil Jalilov's recording of the song with balaban was included on the Voyager Golden musical record, attached to the Voyager spacecraft as representing mugham, the only Azerbaijani song included.

== Gallery ==
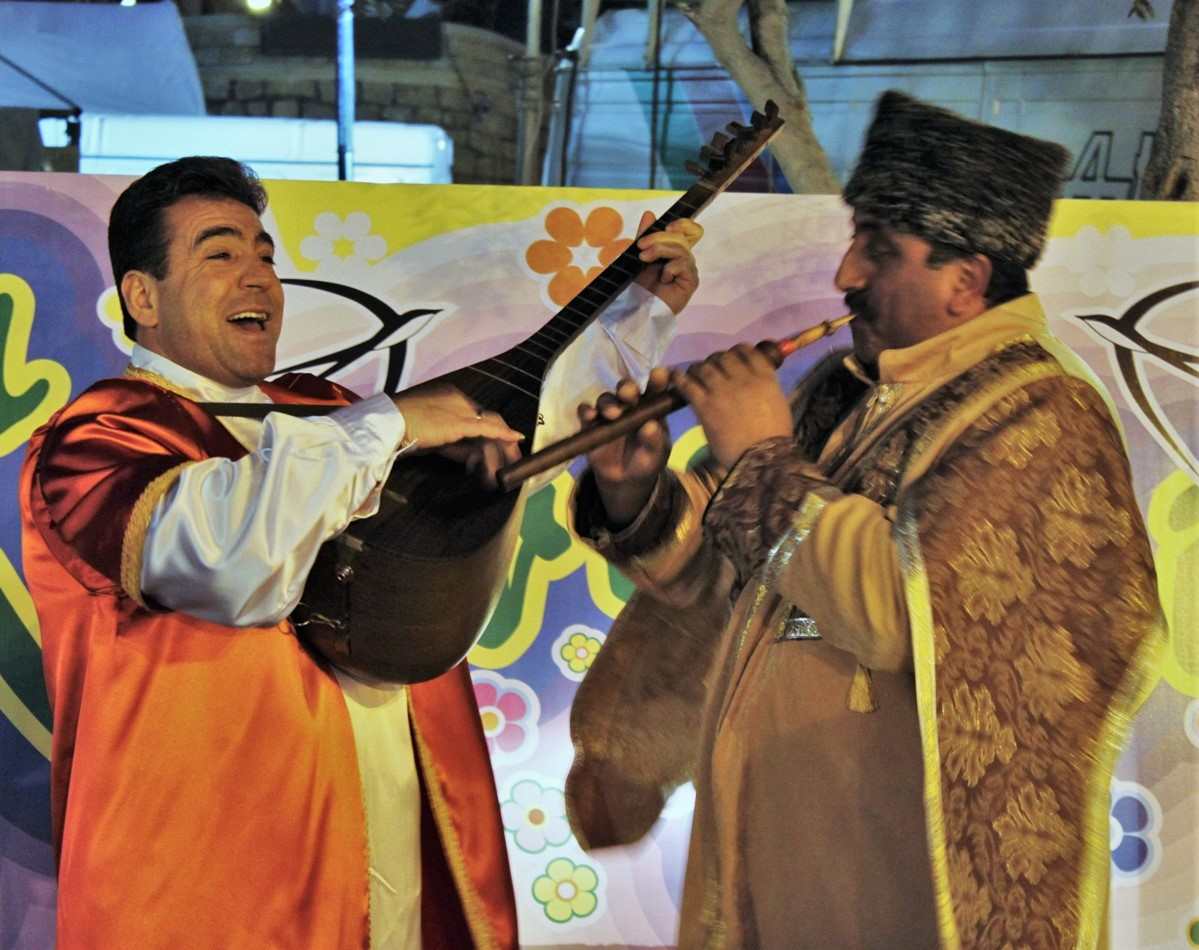
Ashuq plays balaban (right) in Baku. The Lute to the left is a Bağlama.

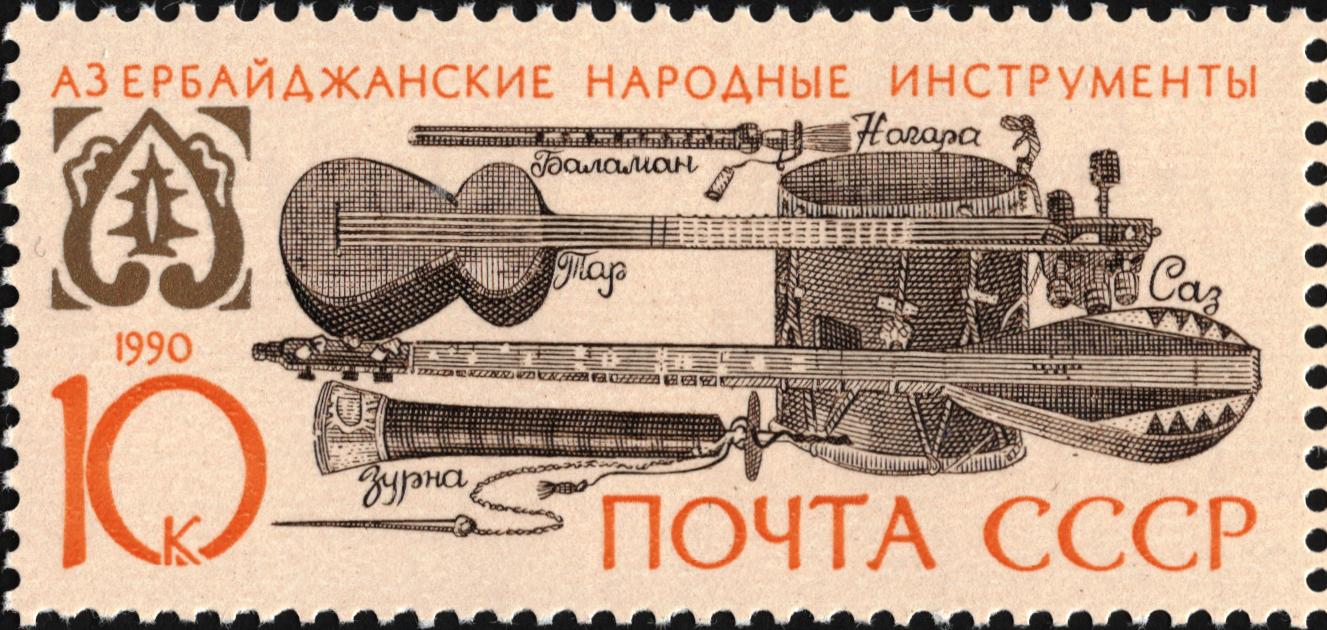
Azerbaijani musical instruments (including balaban) on the stamp of USSR, 1990
