= Duduk =

Armenian woodwind musical instrument

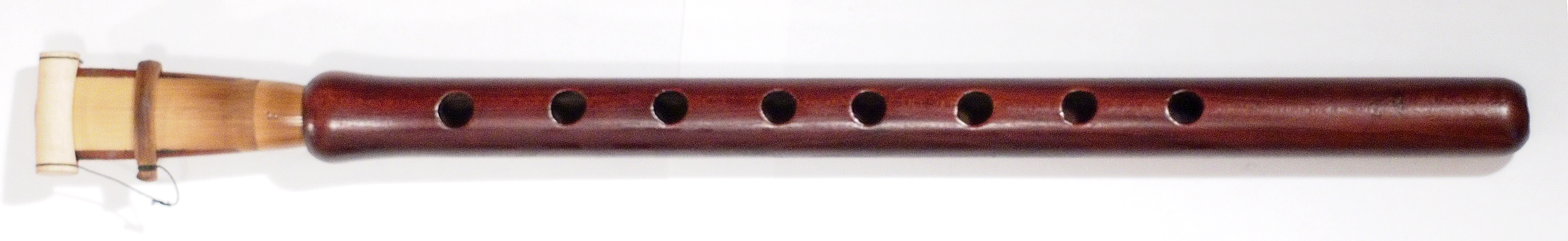
- Duduk

Woodwind instrument
- Classification: Wind instrument with double reed
- Inventor: Armenians

Related instruments
- Closely related instruments include the Mey (Turkey), Balaban (Azerbaijan, Iran), Yasti Balaban (Dagestan), Duduki (Georgia), Duduk (Armenia), Hichiriki (Japan), Piri (Korea), Guanzi (China)

Musicians
- Djivan Gasparyan, Gevorg Dabaghyan, Vache Hovsepyan, Levon Minassian, Pedro Eustache

Sound sample
- Duduk music Melody performed with a duduk by SERGO.TEL.

Duduk and its music
- UNESCO Intangible Cultural Heritage
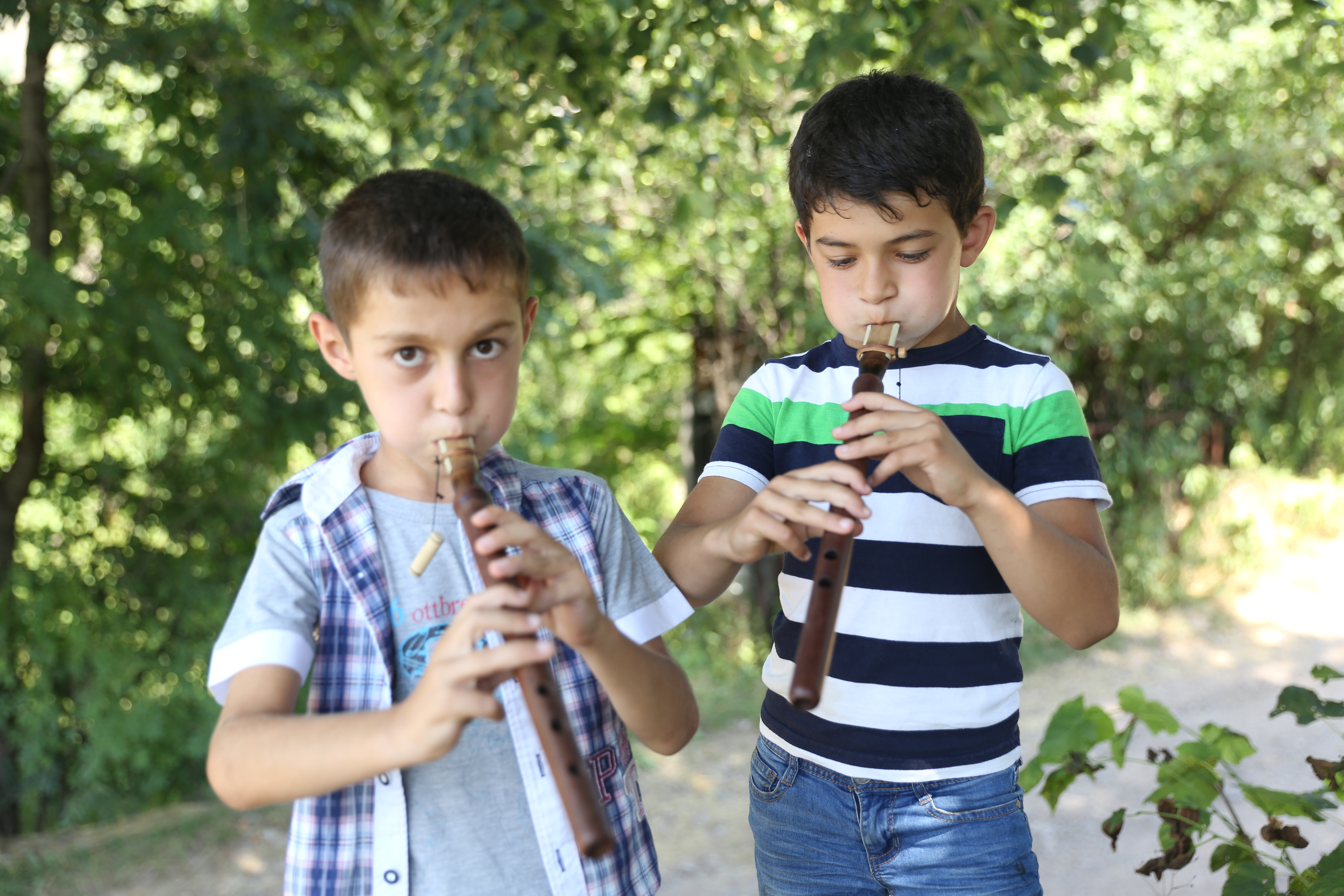
- Two Armenian boys playing the duduk
- Country: Armenia
- Domains: Performing arts (music)
- Reference: 00092
- Region: Europe and North America

Inscription history
- Inscription: 2008 (3rd session)
- List: Representative

The Armenian duduk (/duːˈduːk/ doo-DOOK; Armenian: դուդուկ IPA: [duˈduk]) or Tsiranapogh (Armenian: ծիրանափող, meaning 'apricot-made wind instrument'), is a double reed woodwind instrument made of apricot wood originating from Armenia. Variations of the Armenian duduk appear throughout the Caucasus, the Balkans, and the Middle East. The duduk, balaban and mey are almost identical, except for historical and geographical differences.

It is commonly played in pairs: while the first player plays the melody, the second plays a steady drone called dum, and the sound of the two instruments together creates a richer, more haunting sound. The unflattened reed and cylindrical body produce a sound closer to the English horn than the oboe or bassoon. Unlike other double reed instruments like the oboe or shawm, the duduk has a very large reed proportional to its size.

UNESCO proclaimed the Armenian duduk and its music as a Masterpiece of the Intangible Heritage of Humanity in 2005 and inscribed it in 2008. Duduk music has been used in a number of Hollywood films.

== Etymology ==
Both the Russian book Musical Instruments Encyclopedia (Музыкальные инструменты. Энциклопедия) and American book Musical Instruments, A Comprehensive Dictionary give an ultimate origin of the word duduk as Persian, from tutak.

According to some, the name for the instrument may be derived from the Turkish düdük, meaning "reed pipe". (Note: Attributed to multiple references.) Yaşar Çağbayır and Gerard Clauson derive düdük from Old Turkic tütek, which etymologically means "something which steams or smokes", and in practice "a spout" or more generally "a tube", "a pipe as a musical instrument" and "water-pipe". The word düdük can also mean "whistle" in Turkish expressions.

In Armenia, the instrument is also known as tsiranapogh (ծիրանափող), which means apricot pipe.

== Overview ==
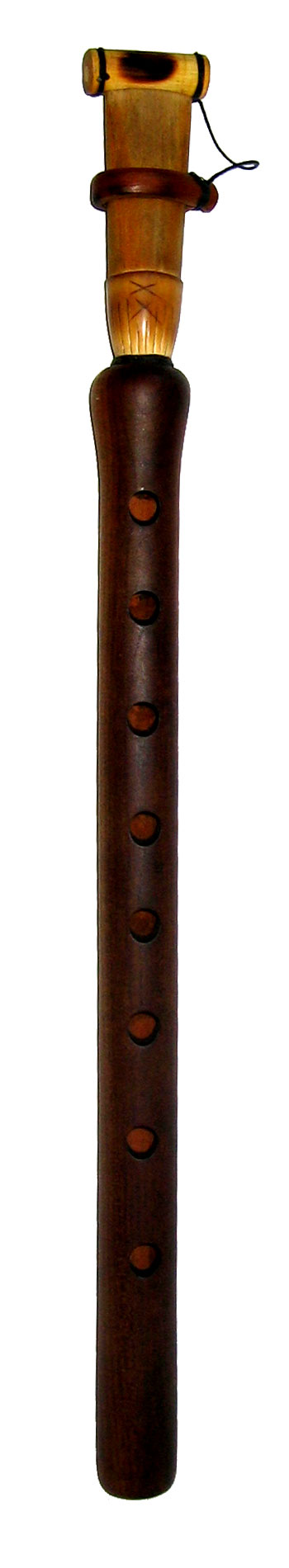

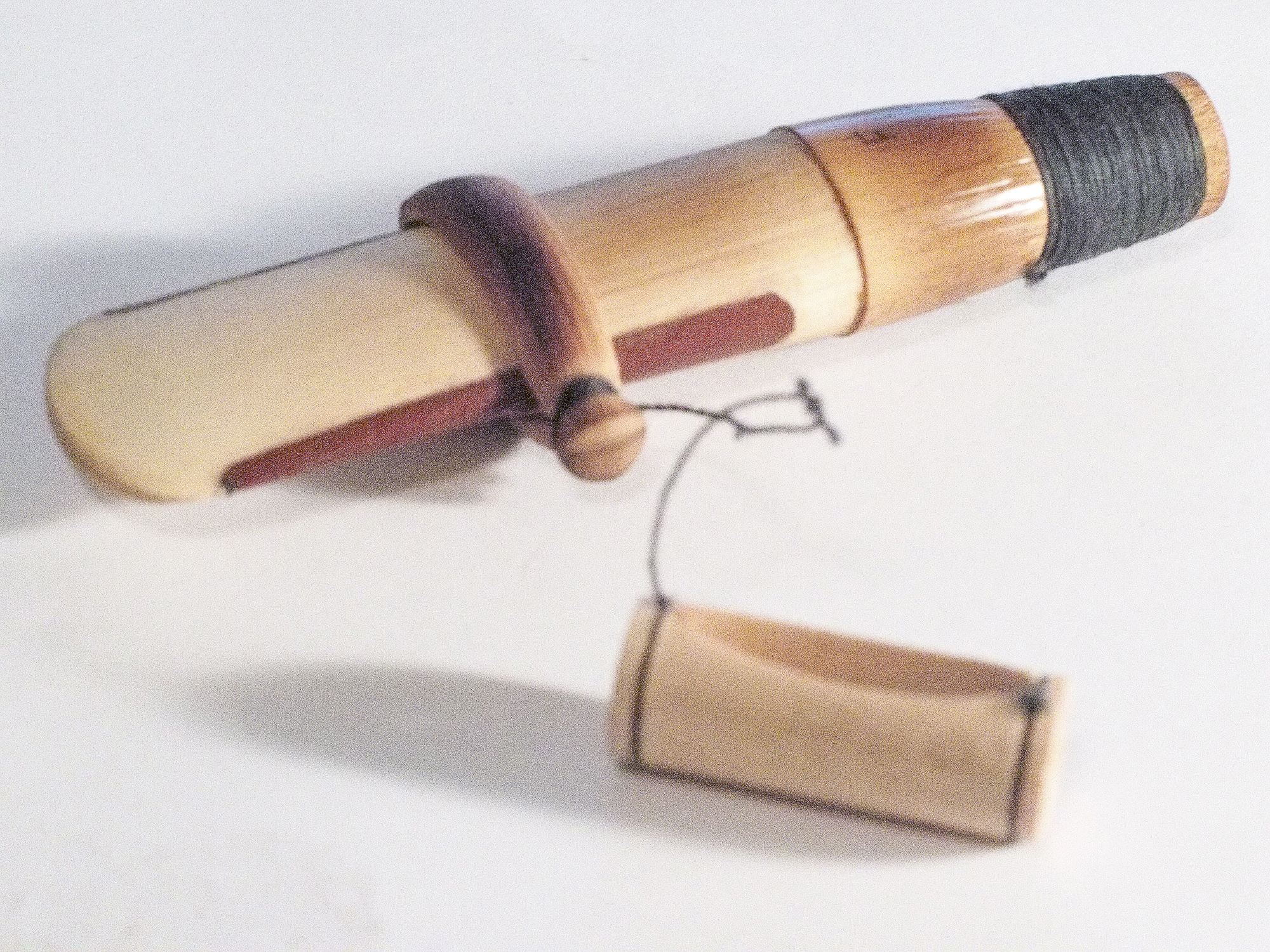
A duduk reed

The duduk is a double reed instrument with ancient origins, having existed since at least the fifth century, while there are Armenian scholars who believe it existed more than 1,500 years before that. The earliest instruments similar to the duduk's present form are made of bone or entirely of cane. Today, the duduk is exclusively made of wood with a large double reed, with the body made from aged apricot wood.

The particular tuning depends heavily on the region in which it is played. An eight-hole duduk (not counting the thumb hole on the lower side) can play ten successive notes of a diatonic scale with simple fingering, or sixteen consecutive notes of a chromatic scale by half-covering holes. For example, an A duduk can play all the notes from F♯ to the A more than an octave higher. (Another reference gives different information.) By using the lips to "bend" notes and partially covering holes any pitch in this range can be produced, as required for Oriental music. The instrument's body has different lengths depending upon the range of the instrument and region. The reed (Armenian: եղեգն, eġegn), is made from one or two pieces of cane in a duck-bill type assembly. Unlike other double-reed instruments, the reed is quite wide, helping to give the duduk both its unique, mournful sound, as well as its remarkable breathing requirements. The duduk player is called dudukahar (դուդուկահար) in Armenian.

The performers use air stored in their cheeks to keep playing the instrument while they inhale air into their lungs. This "circular" breathing technique is commonly used with all the double-reed instruments in the Middle East.

Duduk "is invariably played with the accompaniment of a second dum duduk, which gives the music an energy and tonic atmosphere, changing the scale harmoniously with the principal duduk."

== History ==
Armenian musicologists cite evidence of the duduk's use as early as 1200 BC, though Western scholars suggest it is 1,500 years old. Variants of the duduk can be found in Armenia and the Caucasus. The history of the Armenian duduk music is dated to the reign of the Armenian king Tigran the Great, who reigned from 95 to 55 B.C. According to ethnomusicologist Dr. Jonathan McCollum, the instrument is depicted in numerous Armenian manuscripts of the Middle Ages, and is "actually the only truly Armenian instrument that's survived through history, and as such is a symbol of Armenian national identity ... The most important quality of the duduk is its ability to express the language dialectic and mood of the Armenian language, which is often the most challenging quality to a duduk player."

== Balkan duduk ==
While "duduk" most commonly refers to the double reed instrument described on this page, there is a very similar instrument played in the Balkans, particularly in northwestern Bulgaria. This is a blocked-end flute known as a kaval or kavalče in a part of North Macedonia. It also known as duduk in northwest Bulgaria. A similar instrument is known as frula in Serbia, fluier in Romania, and furulya in Hungary. Made of maple or other wood, it comes in two sizes: 700–780 millimetres (28–31 in) and 240–400 millimetres (9.4–15.7 in) (duduce). The blocked end is flat.

== In popular culture ==
The sound of the duduk has become known to wider audiences through its use in popular film soundtracks. Starting with Peter Gabriel's score for Martin Scorsese's The Last Temptation of Christ, the duduk's archaic and mournful sound has been employed in a variety of genres to depict such moods. Djivan Gasparyan played the duduk in Gladiator, Syriana, and Blood Diamond, among others. It was also used extensively in Battlestar Galactica. In the TV series Avatar: The Last Airbender, its sound was combined with the flicking of a trombone bell to create the fictitious Tsungi horn, most notably played by Iroh and often being featured in the show's soundtrack. With many of the members who worked on ATLA now working on The Dragon Prince, the duduk regularly appears in its soundtrack as well. The sound of the duduk was also used in The Chronicles of Narnia: The Lion, the Witch and the Wardrobe for a lullaby which Mr. Tumnus plays on a fictitious double flute, and was featured in the theme song of the Dothraki clan during the TV adaptation Game of Thrones.

Armenia's entry in the 2010 Eurovision Song Contest, "Apricot Stone", featured Armenian musician Djivan Gasparyan playing the duduk.

=== Selected film soundtracks ===
The Armenian duduk has been used in a number of films, especially "to denote otherworldliness, loneliness, and mourning or to supply a Middle Eastern/Central Asian atmosphere".

- Ararat (2002) by Mychael Danna
- Avatar (2009) by Nacer Khemir, in the track "Shutting Down Grace's Lab"
- Bab'Aziz: le prince qui contemplait son âme (Bab'Aziz: The Prince Who Contemplated His Soul), 2005 by Nacer Khemir
- Bedtime Stories (2008) by Rupert Gregson-Williams
- Brotherhood of the Wolf (2001) by Joseph LoDuca
- The Lion, the Witch and the Wardrobe (2005) by Harry Gregson-Williams, in the track "A Narnia Lullaby"
- Constantine (2005) by Brian Tyler, Klaus Badelt, in the track "Circle of Hell"
- The Crow (1994) by Graeme Revell featuring the duduk player Djivan Gasparyan
- Dead Man Walking (1995) by David Robbins
- Dune (2021) by Hans Zimmer, duduk by Pedro Eustache
- Dune: Part Two (2024) by Hans Zimmer, duduk by Pedro Eustache
- Elektra (2005) by Christophe Beck
- Gladiator (2000) by Djivan Gasparyan in the track "Duduk of the North"
- Hotel Rwanda (2004) main theme music
- Hulk (2003) duduk by Pedro Eustache by Danny Elfman
- The Island (2005) by Steve Jablonsky
- The Kite Runner (2007) by Alberto Iglesias
- Munich duduk by Pedro Eustache (2005) by John Williams
- Mayrig (1991) by Omar Al Sharif
- Next (2007) by Mark Isham
- The Last Temptation of Christ (1988) by Peter Gabriel, featuring the duduk player Vatche Hovsepian
- The Passion of The Christ (2004) by Mel Gibson, composer John Debney duduks by Pedro Eustache and Chris Bleth
- Pirates of the Caribbean: At World's End (2007) by Hans Zimmer
- Rendition (2007) by Paul Hepker and Mark Kilian, duduk by Pedro Eustache
- Ronin (1998) by Elia Cmiral, duduk by Albert Vardanyan
- Syriana (2005) by Alexandre Desplat, duduks by Djivan Gasparyan and Pedro Eustache
- The Russia House (1990) by Jerry Goldsmith
- The Siege (1998) by Graeme Revell, in the track "Torture"
- Vantage Point (2008) by Atli Orvarsson
- Wanted (2008) by Danny Elfman
- Warriors of Heaven and Earth (2003) by A. R. Rahman
- You Don't Mess with the Zohan (2008) by Rupert Gregson-Williams

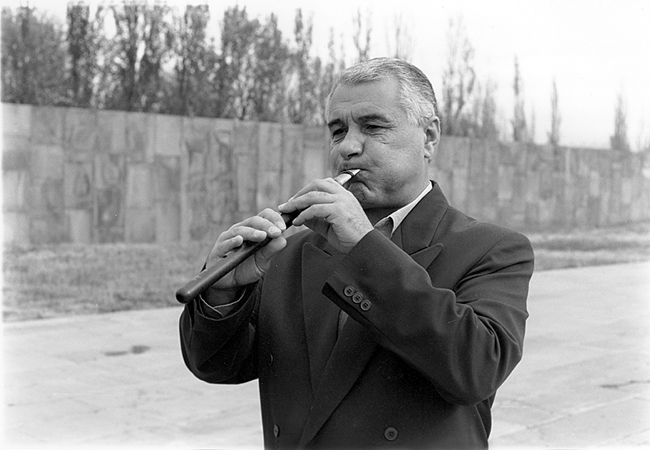
Benik Ignatyan playing the duduk at the Armenian Genocide memorial complex in Yerevan, Armenia, 1997.

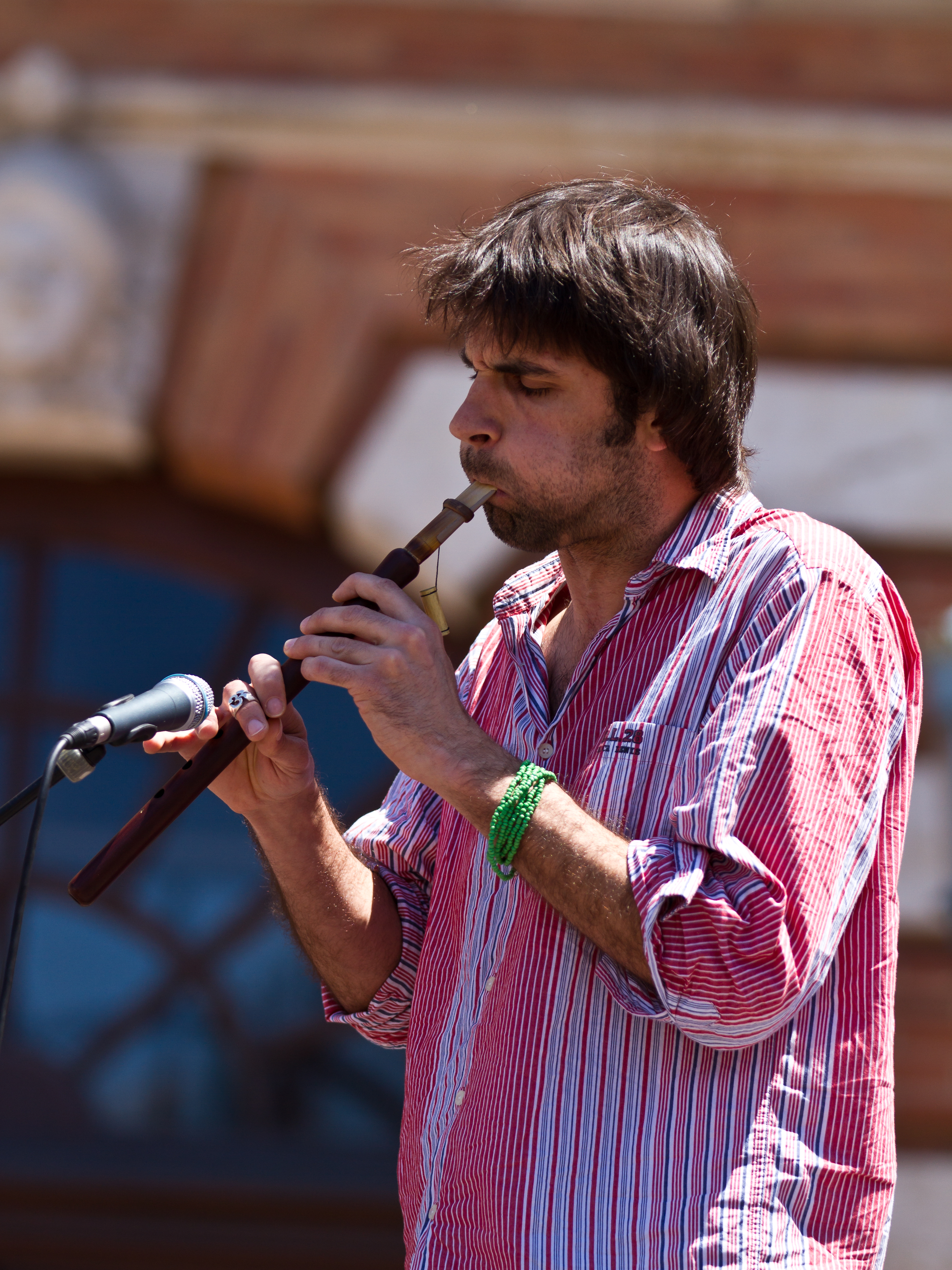
Duduk player at the Forom des langues du monde in Toulouse, France.

=== Television soundtracks ===
- Angel by Rob Kral
- Avatar: The Last Airbender by Jeremy Zuckerman features the instrument in a recurring motif associated with the character of Zuko, most notably in the tracks "Iroh's Tsungi Horn" and "The Blue Spirit"
- Battlestar Galactica (2004 TV series) by Bear McCreary. Its tracks "Two Funerals", "Starbuck on the Red Moon", "Escape from the Farm", "Colonial Anthem, "Black Market", "Something Dark is Coming", "Martial Law", "Prelude to War" feature the duduk. Roslin's theme was set to lyrics a second time for the third-season premiere "Occupation", this time in Armenian.
- Buffy the Vampire Slayer by Christophe Beck, Tomas Wanker, Rob Dunkin, Douglas Stevens
- Castle by Robert Duncan
- Children of Dune by Brian Tyler in the tracks "Dune Messiah", "The Throne of Alia", "The Preacher At Arrakeen", "Farewell"
- Cold Case by Michael A. Levine
- CSI: New York by Bill Brown
- Firefly by Greg Edmonson
- Game of Thrones by Ramin Djawadi features the instrument in Daenerys Targaryen's theme
- JAG by Steve Bramson
- The Mummy Who Would Be King by Gil Talmi, Andrew Gross
- Over There by Ed Rogers
- The Pacific by Blake Neely and Geoff Zanelli
- Path to 9/11 by John Cameron
- Rome by Jeff Beal
- The Dragon Prince by Frederik Wiedmann
- Spartacus by Randy Miller. Track "Second Thought"
- Star Trek: Enterprise by Paul Baillargeon
- Supernatural by Christopher Lennertz, features the instrument in season 1's soundtrack
- Yu-Gi-Oh! by Wayne Sharpe
- Xena: Warrior Princess by Joseph Loduca
- The Lord of the Rings: The Rings of Power by Bear McCreary, features this instrument in settings of the Númenor theme.
- Boohbah
- Foundation (TV series) by Bear McCreary features the instrument in a recurring motif associated with the character of Gaal Dornick.

=== Video game scores ===
- Shards of the Exodar in World of Warcraft: The Burning Crusade by Derek Duke, Glenn Stafford and Russell Brower
- Dalaran in World of Warcraft: Wrath of the Lich King by Derek Duke, Glenn Stafford and Russell Brower
- Orsis in Hearthstone: League of Explorers
- Civilization V by Michael Curran
- Crimson Dragon by Saori Kobayashi and Jeremy Garren
- Dark Void by Bear McCreary
- Dota 2 by Jason Hayes
- F.E.A.R. by Nathan Grigg
- God of War III by Gerard Marino
- Mass Effect by Jack Wall
- Myst III: Exile by Jack Wall
- Myst IV: Revelation by Jack Wall
- Outcast by Lennie Moore in the track "Oriental Spirit"
- Prince of Persia: The Two Thrones by Inon Zur
- Uncharted 2 by Greg Edmonson
- Croft Manor Theme in Tomb Raider Legend by Troels Brun Folmann
- The Elder Scrolls V: Skyrim (2011) by Jeremy Soule in the track "Tundra"
- Total War: Rome II by Richard Beddow
- Empire: Total War
- Metro Exodus by Oleksii Omelchuk
- Xenoblade Chronicles 3 by Kenji Hiramatsu in both Day and Night versions of the track "Eagus Wilderness"
- Sonic Frontiers in the movements for Ares Island by Tomoya Ohtani (duduk performed by Tarumi Yasutaka)

=== Popular music ===
- "Come Talk to Me" by Peter Gabriel (from the 1992 album Us)
- "Zachem Ya" by t.A.T.u. (from the 2001 album 200 Po Vstrechnoy)
- "Prelude & Nostalgia" by Yanni (from the 1997 album Tribute)
- "Prelude & Nostalgia" by Yanni (from the 2006 album Yanni Live! The Concert Event)
- "Science" and "Arto" (Hidden Track) by System of a Down (from the 2001 album Toxicity)
- "Jenny Wren" (2005) and "Back in Brazil" (2018) by Paul McCartney
- "All That I Am" by Rob Thomas (from the 2006 album ...Something to Be)
- "Touching the Void" by Soulfly (from the 2008 album Conquer)
- "Qélé, Qélé" by Sirusho (from the 2008 Eurovision Song Contest Armenian entry)
- "1944" by Jamala (2015)
- "Soulfly X" by Soulfly (from the 2015 album Archangel)
- "Model Village" by Gong (band) (from the 2016 album Rejoice! I'm Dead!)
- "Come Along" by Cosmo Sheldrake (from the 2017 album "The Much Much How How and I", and featured in advertisements for Apple's iPhone XR in the UK, USA, and Canada)
- "Meeting" album by A.G.A. Trio with Arsen Petrosyan on Duduk (2020 by NAXOS WORLD)

=== Anime soundtracks ===
- Arrietty by Cécile Corbel, in the track "Sho's Song - Instrumental Version"
- Tales from Earthsea by Tamiya Terashima, in the tracks "The Trip", "The Spider" and "Violent Robbery/The Seduction of the Undead".

== See also ==
- Music of Armenia
- Gusans
- Aulos
- Shvi
- Zurna
- Sring
- Moscow festival
