= El Haimoune =

- Directed by: Nacer Khemir
- Screenplay by: Nacer Khemir
- Produced by: Latif Production, Satpec France Media
- Starring: Nacer Khemir, Soufiane Makni, Noureddine Kasbaoui, Hedi Daoud, Sonia Ichti
- Cinematography: Georges Barsky
- Edited by: Moufida Tlatli
- Music by: Fethi Zghonda
- Release date: 1984
- Running time: 95 minutes
- Country: Tunisia
- Language: Arabic

El Haimoune (Arabic: الهائمون / Al-Haymun, meaning: The Wanderers) (French: Les Baliseurs du désert, English: Wanderers of the Desert) is a 1984 film by Tunisian writer and director Nacer Khemir. It is the first part of Khemir's "Desert Trilogy" that also includes "The Dove's lost necklace" and Bab'Aziz. It stars Nacer Khemir, Soufiane Makni, Noureddine Kasbaoui, Hedi Daoud, and Sonia Ichti. It was filmed in Tunisia.

== Synopsis ==
El Haimoune is a Sufi tale, a film based on a poem, a quest for roots, love and freedom. A young teacher arrives at a village built on the border of the desert where children have never been to school. Apart from the children, the village is inhabited by elderly men, women, and a mysterious and beautiful young girl. The men left to seek the boundaries of the limitless desert. The teacher is finally captivated by the shimmering world of sand and the Andalusia melody of its wanderers. In this story, magic and reality overlap to sing the beauty of the desert. The filmmaker, through carefully planned shots and sequences, which are treated like paintings, and the poetry of his writing, pays an homage to the splendour of Arabian culture.

== Cast ==
- Nacer Khemir: Abdelsalam
- Soufiane Makni: Houcine
- Noureddine Kasbaoui: Greffier
- Sonia Ichti: Tochter/Fille du Cheikh
- Abdeladhim Abdelhak: Hadj
- Hedi Daoud: Cheikh Hedi Garnati
- Hassen Khalsi: Officier de police
- Jamila Ourabi: Grossmutter
- Hamadi Laghmani: Spieler/Joueur

== Release ==
El Haimoune DVD was released on March 25, 2008. It's in Arabic language with English subtitles.

== Awards ==
- Trois Continents, Nantes 1984
- Mostra de Valencia 1984
- Cartago 1984
