= 44th Locarno Film Festival =

Film festival in Locarno, Switzerland

- Opening film: Citizen Kane directed by Orson Welles
- Closing film: Late Autumn directed by Yasujirō Ozu
- Location: Locarno, Switzerland
- Founded: 1946
- Awards: Golden Leopard: Johnny Suede directed by Tom DiCillo
- Artistic director: David Strieff
- Festival date: Opening: 7 August 1991; Closing: 17 August 1991
- Website: LFF

Locarno Film Festival
- 45th 43rd

The 44th Locarno Film Festival was held from 7 to 17 August 1991 in Locarno, Switzerland. Of the 19 film in competition, ten were world premieres, and eight were first pictures from directors, as Locarno has a focus on discovering new talent.

The opening film was a brand new print of Orson Welles' Citizen Kane and the closing film was a new print of Yasujiro Ozo's Late Autumn. Artistic director, David Strieff paid for the Ozo print personally as a parting gift to the festival. This was his last year as head of the festival after over a decade in the role.

A surprise screening was held for A Brigther Summer Day directed by Edward Yang, which was a big get for the festival. Yang attended the festival along with every director in competition, apart from Sean Pean.

The Golden Leopard, the festival's top prize, was awarded to Johnny Suede directed by Tom DiCillo.

== Jury ==
=== International Jury – Main Competition (Incomplete) ===
- Xavier Koller, Swiss director
- Michael Ballhaus, German cinematographer
- Arielle Dombasle, Gaelic actress

== Official Sections ==
The following films were screened in these sections:

=== Competition ===
Feature Films

English Title	Original Title	Director(s)	Year	Production Country
Barbed Wire	Alambrado	Marco Bechis	1991	Italy, Argentina
Anna Göldin - Last Witch	Anna Göldin - Letzte Hexe	Gertrud Pinkus	1991	Switzerland, Germany
Cheb		Rachid Bouchareb	1991	France, Algérie
Erwin and Julia	Erwin Und Julia	Götz Spielmann	1990	Austria
H		Darrell Wasyk	1990	Canada
The Knot in the Tie	Il Nodo Alla Cravatta	Alessandro Di Robilant	1991	Italy
Indian Runner		Sean Penn	1991	USA
Johnny Suede		Tom DiCillo	1991	USA
The Year of Awakening	L'Annee De L'Eveil	Gérard Corbiau	1991	France
Cloud-Paradise	Oblako-Rai	Nikolaï Dostal	1990	Russia
Ostkreuz		Michael Klier	1991	Germany
Hey, Lads and Lasses	Oy, Vy Gousi	Lidia Bobrova	1991	Russia
Poison		Todd Haynes	1991	USA
Sprung Aus Den Wolken		Nancy Rivas, Stefan Schwieter	1991	Germany, Switzerland
Fire!	Ta Dona	Adama Drabo	1991	Mali, France
Days of Doubt	Tage Des Zweifels	Bernhard Giger	1991	Switzerland
The Dove's Lost Necklace	Tawk Al Hamama Al Mafkoud	Nacer Khemir	1991	Tunisia, France
Tinpis Run		Pengau Nengo	1990	Papua New Guinea
The Funeral	Zazambo	Fumiki Watanabe	1991	Japan

=== Leopards of Tomorrow (Pardi di Domani) ===
Leopards of Tomorrow (Pardi di Domani)

Program Number 1
Original Title	English Title	Director(s)	Year	Production Country
El Saad	El Sad	Saber Akeed	1988	Egypt
Katok I Skripka	The Steamroller and the Violin	Andrei Tarkovsky	1960	Russia
La Vie Des Morts	The Life of the Dead	Arnaud Desplechin	1990	France
Program Number 2
Fa Minor		André Tchernykh	1991	Russia
Koncert Zyczen	Wishes Concert	Krzysztof Kieślowski	1967	Poland
Life In A Day		Gerhard Schirlo	1990	Great Britain
That Burning Question		David Hamblin	1990	USA
Program Number 3
Cadillac Dreams		Matia karrell	1989	USA
Ouagadougou		Idrissa Ouédraogo	1984	France
Palingenesis		Carlos Martinez	1990	USA
Pourquoi?	For What?	Idrissa Ouédraogo	1981	France
The Thruth Game		Jeff Cole	1990	Great Britain
This & That		David Hamblin	1990	Great Britain
Program Number 4
Eating The Last Supper		Alexandra Hooper	1990	Canada
Face Facts		Linda Hugues	1990	Great Britain
Last Year In Vietnam		Oliver Stone	1970	USA
Sparks		Robert Klenner	1989	Australia
Swimming		Belinda Chayko	1990	Australia
Program Number 5
It'S Not Just You Murry		Martin Scorsese	1964	USA
Les Loukoums		Blaise Piguet	1990	Belgium
Pierwsza Projekcja Filmowa W Powszechnej Historii Kina	The First Film Screening in the Universal History of Cinema	Jaroslaw Falinski	1990	Poland
The Brooch Pin And The Sinful Clasp		Jonna Woodward	1989	Great Britain
Program Number 6
Demoniad		Yelena Yershova	1989	Russia
Janez Pavarotti	Pavarotti	Vinci Vogue Anžlovar	1990	Yugoslavia
Koncert	Concert	István Szabó	1961	Hungary
Mella'S Shoes		Pamela Falk	1989	USA
The Green Beret		Stephen Hillenburg	1991	USA
Transit		Igor Shkourine	1990	Russia
Program Number 7
A Broken Horse		Mike Cahill	1990	USA
Electronic Labyrinth		George Lucas	1967	USA
Konservfilm	Conserved Film	Zlatin Radey	1990	Bulgaria
Sezon Pokhoron	The Season of the Funeral	Gorgij Paradzanov	1991	Russia
Sognando A Scatola Aperta	Dreaming of an Open Box	Sarah Webster	1990	Italy
Program Number 8
Balloon		Ken Lidster	1991	Great Britain
Divertissement Or An Isolated Apartment For Chorus Line Dancer		Nino Lapiashvili	1988	Russia
Elegie Bitterfeld		Horst Markgraf	1991	Germany
Honeymoon		Bernd Löhr, Mark Schlichter	1991	Germany
Kegyelmesek	Gracious	Klara Pöter	1990	Hungary
Miriam		Daniel Schmid	1967	Germany
Program Number 9
E.Q.Te		Stefano Argentero	1991	Italy
Ginepro Fatto Uomo	Juniper Made Man	Marco Bellocchio	1962	Italy
Ragout		Thomas Bartels, Martin Hasen	1990	Germany
Sugarblues		Nadia Anliker	1990	USA
Teena And Simon		Ricardo Parilla	1990	Great Britain
Program Number 10
Another Damaging Day		Stacy Cochran	1990	USA
Diplomafilm		Béla Tarr		Hungary
Ellie		Gill Wilkinson	1991	Great Britain
Favagok	Wood Members	Istvan Szaladjak	1989	Hungary
Hogyan Verekedett Meg Jappe Es Do Escobar Utan A Vilag	How Did you Fight Jappe and Do Escobar after the World	Gábor Bódy	1974	Hungary
Toxic		Andrew McEwan	1990	Great Britain

=== Out of Competition ===
Out of Competition (Hors compétition)

Original Title	English Title	Director(s)	Year	Production Country
Barton Fink		Joel Coen, Ethan Coen	1991	USA
Bianzou Bianchang	Life on a String	Chen Kaige	1991	China
Boyz N The Hood		John Singleton	1991	USA
Caido Del Cielo	Fallen from Heaven	Francisco José Lombardi	1990	Spain, Peru
Citizen Kane		Orson Welles	1941	USA
Dandan-E Mar	Download	Masoud Kimiai	1990	Iran
Es Megis	It is Megis	Zsolt Dézdi-Kovacs	1991	Hungary
Goudouldo Ouricherom	Goudouldo Uricherom	Park Kwang-su	1990	South Korea
Il Portaborse	The Door Holder	Daniele Luchetti	1991	Italy, France
Kohayagawa-Ke No Aki	Autumn in Kobayakawa	Yasujirō Ozu	1961	Japan
L'Homme Qui A Perdu Son Ombre	The Man Who Lost His Shadow	Alain Tanner	1991	Spain, Switzerland
La Belle Noiseuse		Jacques Rivette	1991	France, Switzerland
Nazar		Mani Kul	1990	India
Pegnij Pes Begushij Kraem Moria		Karen Guevorkian	1990	Russia
Riff-Raff		Ken Loach	1991	Great Britain
The Adjuster		Atom Egoyan	1991	Canada
Toto Le Heros	Toto the Hero	Jaco Van Dormael	1991	Belgium, France

=== Special Programs ===
==== Roman Polanski in Łódź ====
Original title	English title	Director(s)	Year	Production country
Dwaj Ludzie Z Szafa	Two People with a Wardrobe	Roman Polanski	1958	Poland
Kieidi Spadaja Anioly	When Angels Fall	Roman Polanski	1958	Poland
Lampa	Lamp	Roman Polanski	1959	Poland
Mordertswo	Morerttswo	Roman Polanski	1957	Poland
Rozbijemy Zabawe	We will Break the Fun	Roman Polanski	1957	Poland
Uzmiech Zebiczny	Zebo	Roman Polanski	1957	Poland
==== Anka Schmid In Berlin (DFFB) ====
Die Reise Zur Südsee	The Trip to the South Pacific	Anka Schmid	1986	Germany
Habibi - Ein Liebesbrief	Habibi - a Love Letter	Anka Schmid	1986	Germany
Herzens-Freude	Heart Joy	Anka Schmid	1986	Switzerland
Mailma - Eine Improvisation	Mailma - An Improvisation	Anka Schmid	1988	Germany
Rondo - Gravitat	Rondo - Weights	Anka Schmid	1986	Germany
Transparenz	Transparency	Anka Schmid	1983	Germany
==== Christine Carrière In Paris (FEMIS) ====
Brouhaha		Christine Carrière	1988	France
Les Pieds Humides	The Damp Feet	Christine Carrière	1990	France
Mariage Blanc	White Wedding	Christine Carrière	1989	France
==== Entrants from Moscow (VGIK) ====
Le Jeu	The Game	Abderrahmane Sissako	1990	Mauritania
Sanos Y Sanitarios	Healthy and Health	Xavier Berrios	1990	Cuba
Örült De Angyal	Rejoiced De Angel	Tamas Toth	1991	Hungary
==== New York Special ====
Amore Eterno	Eternal Love	Massimo Ciccioriccio	1990	USA
Coyote Mountain		Stacy Cochran		USA
Gold Mountain		Rachel Saltz, Kryssa Schemmerl	1990	USA
Red Herring		Isabel Henger	1991	USA
==== The Whole Latest Selection (La toute dernière sélection) ====
Desimt Municiu Pries Ikaro Skrydi	A Minute of a Minute Before the Icaro Flight	Arunas Mateils	1990	Russia
Elossa	Alive	Jukka-Pekka Siili	1990	Finland
Killers Connections		Olivier Zimmermann	1991	Switzerland
Malchik I Golub	Boy and Dove	Andrei Konchalovsky	1962	Russia
Midnight Barbeque		Ruedi Gerber	1991	USA
Tanulmany A Fografiarol	Study is the Photografiarol	Vilmos Thernesz	1990	Hungary
==== Aspects of the Formation (ESAV) ====
Au Fond Du Couloir	At the Bottom of the Corridor	Atelier A. Arnold	1990	Switzerland
Deux Frères	Two Brothers	Olivier Moeckli Moeckli	1990	Switzerland
Face Detector		Vidéo-atelier M. Kaufmann	1990	Switzerland
Heroic Death By Smoking		Travail collectif dirigé par K. Jacobs	1989	Switzerland
La Belle Au Bois Dormant	Sleeping Beauty	Sybille Bühler, Catrina Ganzoni	1991	Switzerland
Neuf Fois Saint-Antoine	Nine Times Saint-Antoine	Atelier D. Comtat	1990	Switzerland
Situation General		Richard Vetterli	1990	Switzerland
==== Mona Hoel in Stockholm ====
Blue		Mona Hoel	1987	Sudan
Brief Encounters Ii		Mona Hoel	1986	Sudan
Huset	The House	Mona Hoel	1989	Sudan
Luciana'S Morning		Mona Hoel	1984	Sudan
Nora'S Secret		Mona Hoel	1985	Sudan

=== Tribute To ===
==== Les Films Du Losange ====
Original Title	English Title	Director(s)	Year	Production Country
Celine Et Julie Vont En Bateau	Celine and Julie Go by Boat	Jacques Rivette	1974	France
La Marquise D'O	The Marquise d'O	Éric Rohmer	1975	France
Le Jour Des Rois	Kings Day	Marie-Claude Treilhou	1991	France
Une Sale Histoire	A Dirty Story	Jean Eustache	1977	France
==== Riccardo Freda ====
Beatrice Cenci		Riccardo Freda	1956	Italy
I Miserabili	The Miserable	Riccardo Freda	1947	Italy
I Mosaici Di Ravenna	The Mosaics of Ravenna	Riccardo Freda		Italy
Il Cavaliere Misterioso	The Mysterious Knight	Riccardo Freda	1948	Italy
Lo Spettro	The Spectrum	Riccardo Freda, Robert Hampton	1963	Italy
Teodora Imperatrice Di Bisanzio	Teodora Imperatrice of Byzantium	Riccardo Freda	1954	Italy
==== Vittorio Cottafavi ====
I Cento Cavalieri	The Hundred Knights	Vittorio Cottafavi	1965	Italy
La Donna Libera	The Free Woman	Vittorio Cottafavi	1954	Italy
La Fiamma Che Non Si Spegne	The Flame that Does not Turn Off	Vittorio Cottafavi	1949	Italy
Maria Zeef	Maria Seef	Vittorio Cottafavi	1981	Italy
Traviata '53		Vittorio Cottafavi	1953	Italy

=== Retrospective – Jacques Becker ===
Retrospective Jacques Becker
Original Title	English Title	Director(s)	Year	Production Country
Ali Baba Et Les Quarante Voleurs	Ali Baba and the Forty Thieves	Jacques Becker	1954	France
Antoine Et Antoinette	Antoine and Antoinette	Jacques Becker	1947	France
Casque D'Or	Gold Helmet	Jacques Becker	1952	France
Dernier Atout	The Trump Card	Jacques Becker	1942	France
Edouard Et Caroline	Edward and Caroline	Jacques Becker	1951	France
Falbalas	Paris Frills	Jacques Becker	1945	France
Goupi-Mains Rouges	Red Goupi-Mayors	Jacques Becker	1943	France
L'Or Du Cristobal	Cristobal's Gold	Jacques Becker	1940	France
La Grande Esperance	The Great Expense	Jacques Becker	1936	France
La Vie Est À Nous	Life is Us	Jean Renoir	1936	France
Le Commissaire Est Bon Enfant	The Commissioner is Good Child	Jacques Becker	1935	France
Le Trou	The Hole	Jacques Becker	1960	France
Les Aventures D'Arsene Lupin	The Adventures of Arsene Lupine	Jacques Becker	1957	France
Montparnasse 19		Jacques Becker	1958	France
Rendez-Vous De Juillet	July Meeting	Jacques Becker	1949	France
Rue De L'Estrapade	T	Jacques Becker	1953	France
Touchez Pas Au Grisbi	Do not Touch Grisbi	Jacques Becker	1954	France

The Trump Card

=== Special Sessions ===
Original Title	English Title	Director(s)	Year	Production Country
Family Express		George Nicolas Hayek	1990	Switzerland, France
Le Film Du Cinema Suisse	The Film of the Swiss Cinema	Jean-Francois Amiguet, Ernest Ansorge	1991	Switzerland
Visages Suisses	Swiss Faces	Matteo Bellinelli, Simon Edelstein	1991	Switzerland

=== Out of Program ===
Original Title	English Title	Director(s)	Production Country
Roma Intorno A Roma	Rome Around Rome	Carlo Sparanero	Italy

=== Film Surprise ===
Original Title	English Title	Director(s)	Production Country
Guling Jie Shaonian Sharen Shijian	A Brighter Summer Day	Edward Yang	Taiwan

== Independent Sections ==
=== Critics Week ===
The Semaine de la Critique is an independent section, created in 1990 by the Swiss Association of Film Journalists in partnership with the Locarno Film Festival.

Original Title	English Title	Director(s)	Year	Production Country
Arthur Rimbaud, Une Biographie	Arthur Rimbaud, a Biography	Richard Dindo	1991	Switzerland
Dar Koutche-Haye Eshgh	Quqshhhi House I Was	Khosro Sinaie	1991	Iran
Face Value		Johan van der van der Keuken	1991	Netherlands
Privilege		Yvonne Rainer	1990	USA
Schmetterlingsschatten	Butterfly Shadow	Anne Kasper Spoerri	1991	Switzerland
Trois Jours En Grèce	Three Days in Greece	Jean-Daniel Pollet	1991	France

=== New Swiss ===
New Swiss Films / Feature Films
Original Title	English Title	Director(s)	Year	Production Country
Adolf Dietrich, Kunstmaler	Adolf Dietrich, Painter	Friedrich Kappeler	1991	Switzerland
Chartres		Heinz Bütler	1991	Switzerland
Chronique Paysanne En Gruyère	Peasant Chronicle in Gruyère	Friedrich Kappeler	1990	Switzerland
Der Berg	The Mountain	Markus Imhoof	1990	Switzerland
Hinter Verschlossenen Türen	Behind Closed Doors		1991	Switzerland, Germany
Immer & Ewig	Always & Forever	Heinz Bütler	1991	Switzerland
Jacques & François		Francis Reusser	1991	Switzerland, France
Le Cri Du Lezard		Bertrand Theubet	1990	Switzerland, France
Les Carnets De Sandor	Sandor's Notebooks	Mark Hunyadi, Hugues Ryffel	1991	Switzerland
Männer Im Ring	Men in the Ring	Erich Langjahr	1990	Switzerland
Palaver, Palaver		Alexander J. Seiler	1990	Switzerland
Point De Vue	Point of View	Bernhard Lehner, Andres Pfäffli	1991	Switzerland
Seriat		Urs Graf, Marlies Graf Dätwyler	1991	Switzerland
Witschi Geht	Witschi Goes	Paolo Poloni Poloni	1990	Switzerland
New Swiss / Short Films
Original Title	English Title	Director(s)	Year	Production Country
A Busy Woman Like Me		Bianca Conti Rossini	1990	Switzerland
Le Bol	The Bowl	Nicolas Wadimoff	1990	Switzerland
Liberation		Michael Peterli	1990	Switzerland

== Official Awards ==
=== Official Jury ===
- Golden Leopard: Johnny Suede directed by Tom DiCillo
- Silver Leopard: Cloud Paradise directed by Nikolaï Dostal
- Bronze Leopard (Third Prize): H directed by Darrell Wasky
- Bronze Leopard (Fourth Prize): Cheb directed by Rachid Bouchareb
- Bronze Leopard (Special prize): Tawk Al Hamama Al Mafkoud directed by Nacer Khemir
