= Mey (instrument) =

Musical instrument

Woodwind instrument
- Classification: Double reed

Related instruments
- Closely related instruments include the Balaban (Azerbaijan), Yasti Balaban (Dagestan), Duduki (Georgia), Duduk (Armenia), Hichiriki (Japan), Piri (Korea), Guanzi (China), and Kamis Sirnay (Kyrgyzstan) Other double reed instruments, less similar include: Birbynė; Rhaita; Shawm; Sopila; Sorna; Suona; Zurna

Craftsmanship and performing art of balaban/mey
- UNESCO Intangible Cultural Heritage
- Country: Azerbaijan and Turkey
- Reference: 01704
- Region: Europe and North America

Inscription history
- Inscription: 2023 (18th session)
- List: Representative

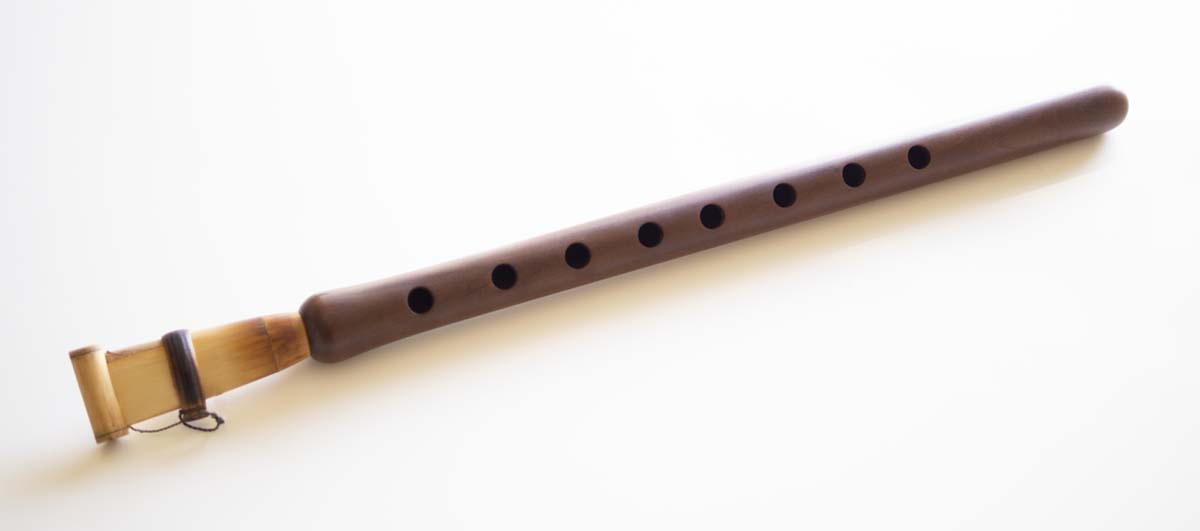
This image is of a duduk, an instrument nearly identical to the mey.

The mey is a double-reed aerophone used in Turkish folk music. The mey, duduk, and balaban are almost identical, except for historical and geographical differences.

== Description ==
A mey consists of three parts: ana gövde (main part), kamış (reed), and kıskaç (clip).

1. Cylindrical in shape and made of wood, the main part has seven finger holes on its front side, and one finger hole at the back. The mey's main tubular body is usually built from the wood of harder trees such as plum, walnut, beech, etc. It has a sound range of about one octave. There are three sizes of mey: cura mey (smallest, highest pitched), orta mey, and ana mey (largest, lowest pitched).
2. A double reed (kamış in Turkish) essentially a large and almost flattened cylinder on the mouth side, and conical-round where it is attached to the main part, gives this instrument its characteristic deep sound.
3. A tuning-bridle called kıskaç (clip) mounted to the end of the reed and pushed up and down on the reed until a position is decided serves to tune the Mey and to prevent alterations in pitch of the sound. A wooden piece similar to the kıskaç, which is called ağızlık, covers the part of the reed's mouth when the mey is not being played in order to preserve or protect it. The size and nature of the reed is dependent on the size and nature of the instrument, but is usually approximately one third the size of the main part.

== History ==
There are many instruments similar to the mey in Eurasia. These include the European aulos and douçaine , the Azerbaijani/Iranian balaban, the Uyghur balaman, the Dagestani yasti balaban, the Georgian duduki, the Armenian duduk, the Japanese hichiriki, the Korean piri, the Chinese guanzi and houguan, the Kyrgyz kamis sirnay, and the Cambodian pey au.

Musicologists like Farmer (1936: 316) and Picken (1975: 480) have suggested that the ancient wind instruments mait, monaulos, and auloi present major resemblances with the mey and the other similar instruments. In Hellenistic Egypt, there was an instrument called mait or monaulos which was similar to the mey and there was another one in Anatolia which was called auloi and its picture was found on a vase.
