= Die Tunisreise =

- Directed by: Bruno Moll
- Screenplay by: Bruno Moll, Nacer Khemir
- Produced by: PRISMA FILM, FAMA FILM AG
- Starring: Nacer Khemir
- Cinematography: Matthias Kälin
- Edited by: Anja Bombelli
- Music by: Johann Sebastian Bach
- Release date: 2007
- Running time: 75 minutes
- Countries: Austria; Swaziland; Tunisia

Die Tunisreise is a 2007 documentary film.

== Synopsis ==
This documentary connects two artistic trajectories belonging to two different eras. The former was done by Paul Klee, whose work was considerably influenced by his journey to Tunis, Tunisia, in 1914. The latter is done by the Tunisian filmmaker and painter Nacer Khemir, inspired by Klee's paintings. This film shows the connection between the possibilities offered by images and reveals the links between both artists. Nearly a hundred years after Paul Klee, Nacer Khemir retraces Paul Klee's footsteps in Tunisia, guiding the spectator into the rich history and culture of Tunisia
