= Moscow International Duduk Festival =

Annual music festival

Moscow International Duduk Festival Московский международный фестиваль дудука
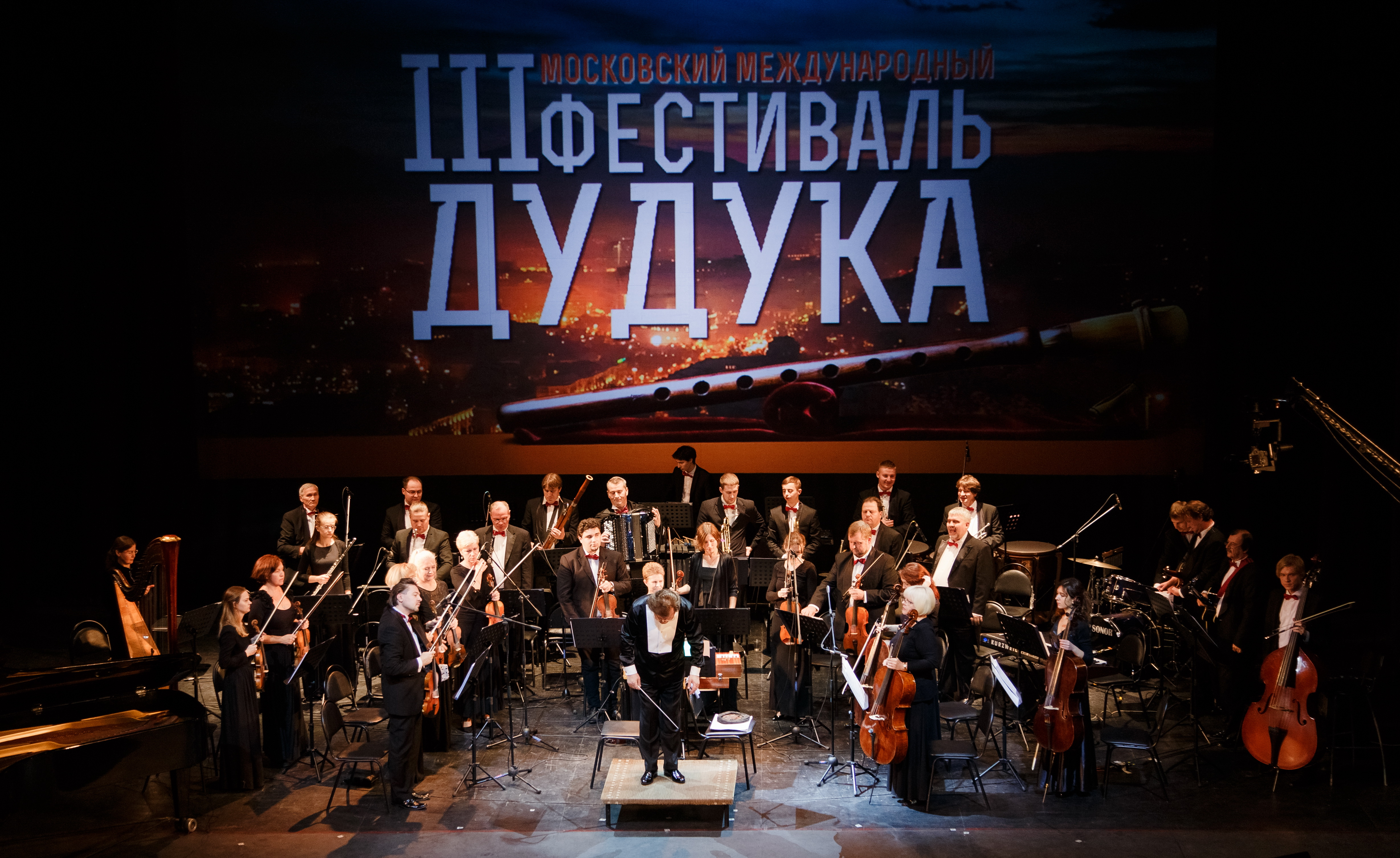
- Performance of the Russian State Academic Concert Orchestra "Boyan" at the Third Moscow International Duduk Festival
- Genre: Folk
- Locations: Russia, Moscow
- Years active: since 2014
- Founders: Marina Selivanova, Suren Baghdasaryan
- Website: dudukist.ru/en

The Moscow International Duduk Festival, MIDF (Armenian: Դուդուկի մոսկովյան միջազգային փառատոն, ԴՄՄՓ; Russian: Московский международный фестиваль дудука, ММФД) is an international annual music festival of Armenian national musical instrument of Duduk held in Moscow.

== Organizers ==
The Festival is organized by the project Dudukist, which at this moment consists of Suren Baghdasaryan and Marina Selivanova (until 2016 – also Hovhannes Ghazaryan) In 2014 organizers of the Festival founded The School of Duduk under the direction of dudukist Hovhannes Ghazaryan.

== Purposes ==
One of the main objectives of the Festival is to strengthen cultural bonds and cooperation between Russia, Armenia and other countries, as well as to promote the preservation and development of Armenian culture. The Festival also aims at finding and promoting talented duduk players from different parts of the world.

== History ==
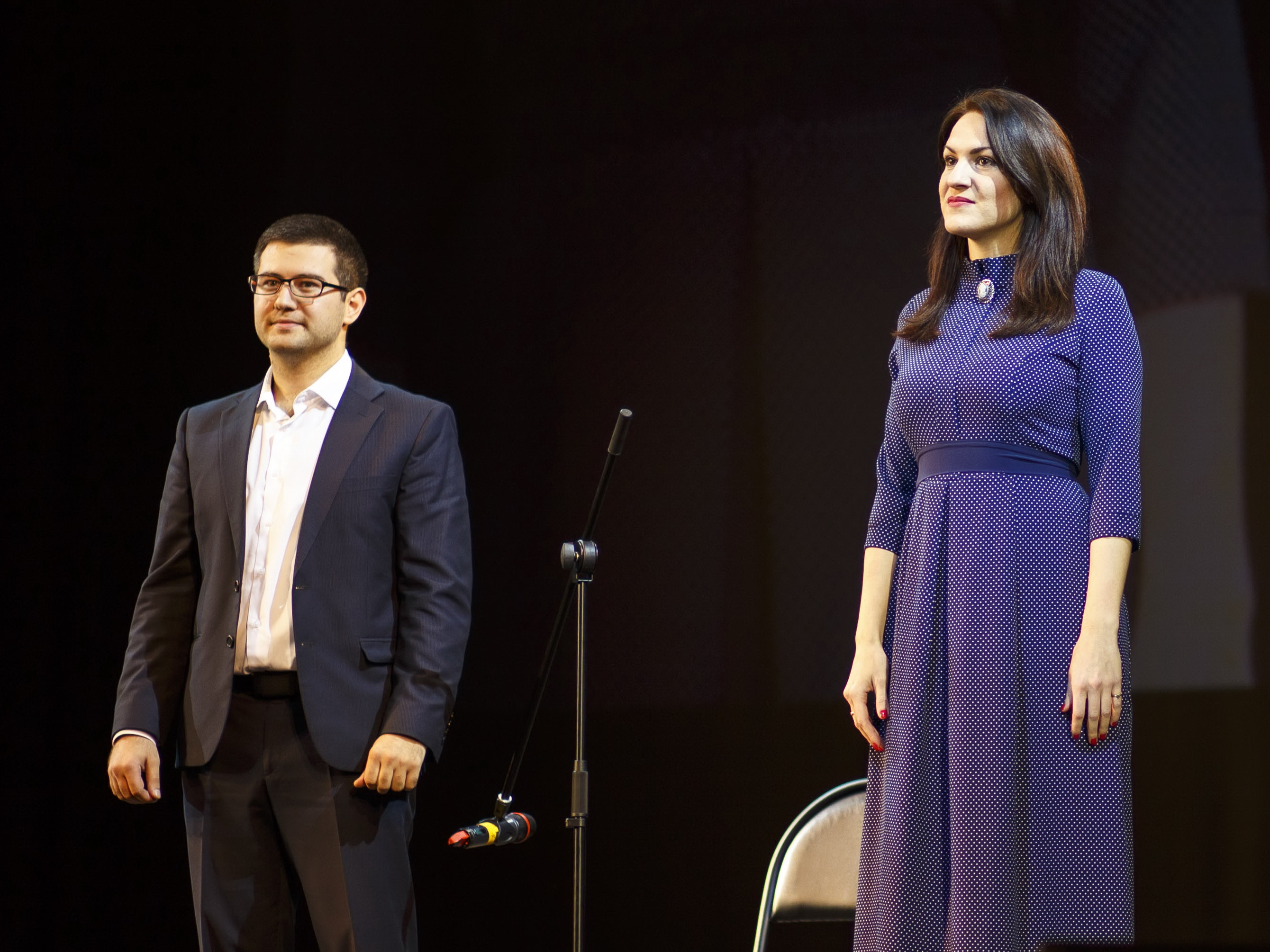
Organizers of the Festival: Suren Baghdasaryan and Marina Selivanova

The First Moscow Duduk Festival was held on 30 April 2014, at the Cultural Center “Moskvich”. The participants of the festival included Hovhannes Ghazaryan, Martin Ghazaryan, Vardan Harutyunyan, Valeriy Nam, Argishti, Aram Avedikyan, Yuriy Muradyan, Selena, Gegham Ohanyan, Gevorg Hayrapetyan, David Hovsepyan, Vitaliy Poghosyan, Aleksey Sadoev, Merujan Achoyan, instrumental band “OTTA-orchestra”, singer Diana Dikovski, famous author and performer Yevgeniy Ross, singer and one of the organizers of the Festival Marina Selivanova. Stage-director of the Festival – Artistic Director of “Gavit” Theatre Hamlet Galechyan, the Festival was hosted by Ruben Mkhitaryan. A total number of around one thousand people visited The First Moscow International Duduk Festival.

The Second Moscow Duduk Festival was held on 27 September 2015, in the Moscow State Variety Theatre. The participants of the Festival included Georgiy Minasov, Artak Asatryan, Georgiy Minasyan, Manvel Mnatsakanyan, Kamo Seyranyan, Gagik Malkhasyan, Hovhannes Ghazaryan, Norayr Barseghyan, Martin Ghazaryan, Vitaliy Poghosyan, Emmanuel Hovhannisyan, Argishti, ensemble “Dudukist”, duduk quartet “Urartu”, Tatul Hambartsumyan. Well-known performer of dance, folk and patriotic songs Dzakh Harut was also among those, who visited the Festival. Stage-director of the Festival –Artistic Director of “Gavit” Theatre Hamlet Galechyan, the Festival was hosted by Ruben Mkhitaryan. A total number of around 1.5 thousand people visited The Second Moscow International Duduk Festival.

The Third Moscow International Duduk Festival, organized by “Dudukist” project, took place on 25 September 2016 in the concert hall “Moskvich”. The Third Duduk Festival reached an even higher professional level due to the impeccable musical program accompanied by Russian Academic Concert Orchestra "Boyan". The orchestra has a unique composition and has no analogues in the world. Conductor - the Honoured Artist of the Russian Federation Nikolai Stepanov. The festival brought together the best duduk players of the world. The third festival's participants included Honoured Artist of Armenia Georgiy Minasov and his legendary ensemble “Dudukner”, Honoured Artist of Armenia Gagik Malkhasyan, Georgiy Minasyan, Artak Asatryan, Norayr Barseghyan, Anahit and Anna Mkhitaryan, Martin Ghazaryan, Vitaliy Poghosyan, Argishti, Arsen Grigoryan, Hovhannes Ghazaryan, ensemble “Dudukist”, Raphael Mkhitaryan, Emmanuel Hovhannisyan, Tatul Hambardzumyan and Selena. The Third Moscow International Duduk Festival was held with the support of the Armenian Youth Congress of Russia. Stage-director of the Festival –Artistic Director of “Gavit” Theatre Hamlet Galechyan, the Festival was hosted by Ruben Mkhitaryan.

On October 1, 2017, the IV Moscow International Duduk Festival was held in the small hall of the State Kremlin Palace. The festival was attended by dudukists from different countries, among which are: Vitaly Poghosyan, Armen Hovhannisyan, Rafael Mkrtchyan, Gegham Ohanyan, Khosrow Manukyan, Georgy Minasyan, Artak Asatryan Tatul Hambardzumyan, Karine Drnoyan Gegham Ohanyan, honored artist of Armenia Georgi Minasov and his Dudukner ensemble, also Acapella Express group and OTTA Orchestra. The host of the annual festival was Ruben Mkhitaryan. Soloists, like the year before, were accompanied by the Boyan State Academic Russian Concert Orchestra (conductor Nikolay Stepanov).

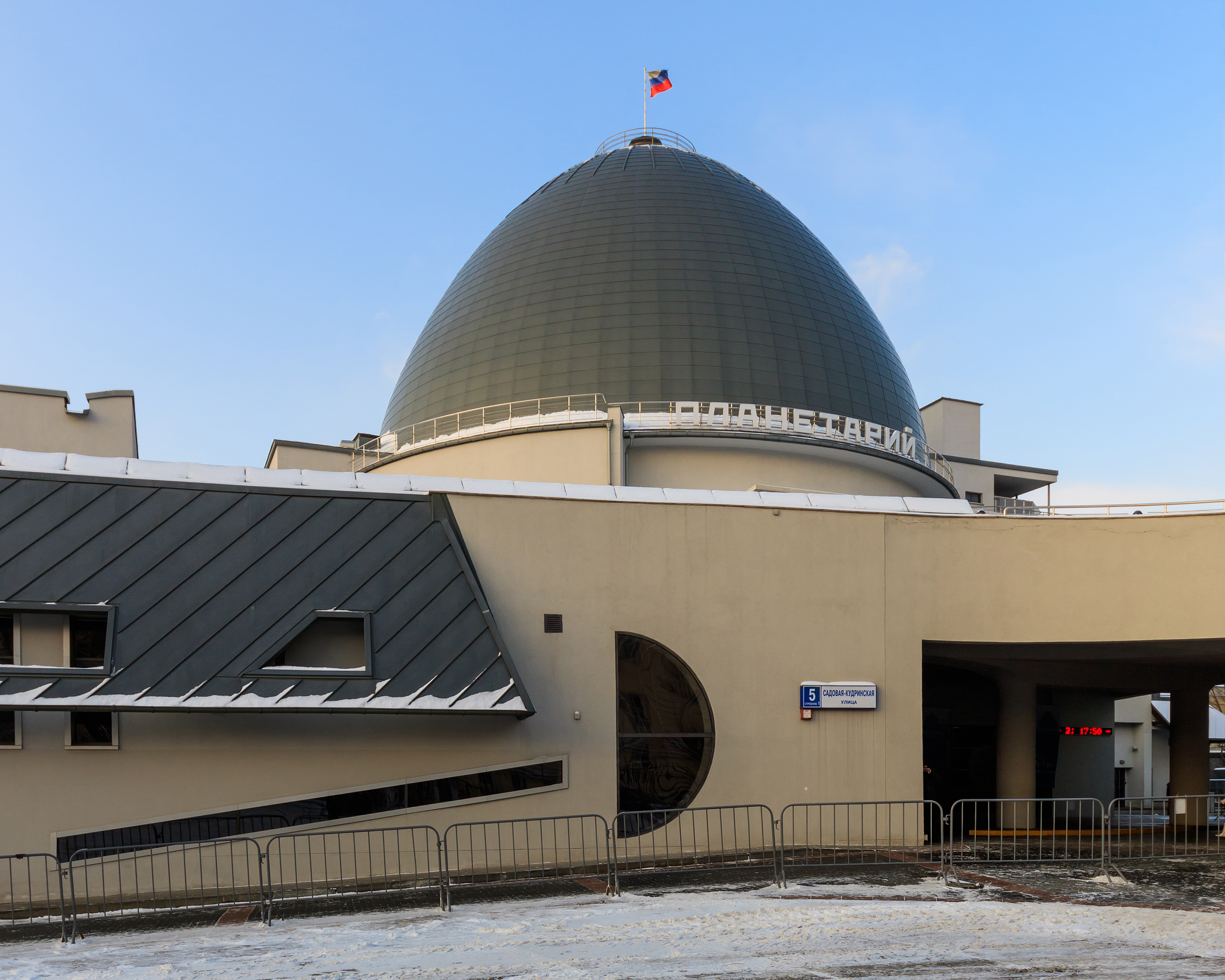
Moscow Planetarium

The Fifth Moscow International Duduk Festival took place on October 6 and 7, 2018, during the World Space Week at the Moscow Planetarium. Dudukists of international level from various countries took part in the festival, including Professor of Yerevan Komitas State Conservatory Gevorg Dabagyan, laureate of international competitions, winner of the Babylonian festival Martin Ghazaryan, soloist of the Yerevan State Philharmonic, Harutyun Chkolyan, soloist of the Akunq Armenian folk ensemble Armen Hovhannisyan, musician of the State Orchestra of Folk Instruments, founder of the ensemble The Birds Band Norayr Gapoyan. The concert was also attended by the 0zareniye chamber choir, the multi-voiced Tamzara choir, and modern composers and musicians: Andrei Tanzyu (frame drums, rik, percussion), Gennady Lavrentyev (violin, tabla, fretless guitar), Ivan Muralov (Indian sitar), Paata Chakaberia (fretless bass guitar), Dmitry Losev (keyboards, electronics), Sati Kazanova. Unlike last year's events, the Fifth Festival was marked by a full-domed multimedia show with full immersion in the space to the sounds of the duduk. Especially for this, the organizers shot a unique film that was broadcast directly to the dome of the planetarium.

=== International Duduk Festival in Spain ===
In July 2016, the project Dudukist organized two concerts in the framework of the International Duduk Festival in Spain as part of the "Days of Armenia" festival. On 3 July 2016 duduk festival in Centro Civico Cotxeres Borrel in Barcelona was held, and on 5 July 2016 the festival was held in Catalan city of Lloret de Mar, on the sidelines of which dudukists from Armenia, Spain and Russia performed on the central square of the city, in front of the City Hall. The participants included ensemble “Dudukist” of Moscow School of Duduk (Artistic Director – Hovhannes Ghazaryan), Baeva Larisa, Aleksey Kapitonov, Iosif Gasparyan, Artyom Torosyan, Grigoriy Romanov, Nika Ohanyan, Simon Osepyan, Mariya Khayarova, Gegham Ohanyan, Marina Selivanova, Catalan School of Duduk (Artistic Director – Hovhannes Karakhanyan), Roland Terborg, Gener Omedis, Sedrak Petrosyan, Valentin Carole, Raul, Shushanik Hovhannisyan. The festival was held with the support of the Russian House in Catalonia.
