= Hossein Panahi =

Iranian actor and poet (1956–2004)

- حسین پناهی
- Born: 28 August 1956
- Died: 4 August 2004 (aged 47); Tehran, Iran
- Occupation(s): Poet, writer, actor, director
- Website: http://hosseinpanahi.ir

Hossein Panahi Dezhkooh (Persian: حسین پناهی دژکوه; 28 August 1956 – 4 August 2004) was an Iranian actor and poet. After graduating from high school, due to his father's recommendation, he found his way to Ayatollah Golpaygaani's religious class. Hossein then returned to his hometown as a religious figure, but this lasted only for a few months. He then moved to Tehran and started studying in Anahita art school for four years and graduated as an actor and a screenwriter.

Hossein started his acting career in a TV show named: Mahalleh Behdaasht (Hygiene Neighborhood). He then performed in some TV shows written by himself which were not much successful. He later received recognition from a show named Two ducks in fog. He was the writer and director of the show as well as performing in it. This was his breakthrough and people requested his shows to be broadcast again.

Hossein died of a heart attack at the age of 47. He was buried in the city of Soogh next to his mother.

== Filmography ==
=== Films ===
1. Bab'Aziz (2005)
2. Ghessé hayé kish (1999) (segment "The Greek Boat")
3. The Fateful Day (1995)
4. Mard-e na-tamam (1992)
5. Mohajeran (1992)
6. Avinar (1991)
7. Hey Joe! (1988)

=== Theater ===
- Chizi Shabih-e Zendegi
- Do Morghabi Dar Meh

=== TV series ===
- Mahalle-ye Behdasht
- Roozi Roozegari
- Azhans-e Doosti
- Imam Ali
- Dozdan-e Madabozorg
- Koochak-e Jangali
- Yahya va Golabatoon
- Roozegar-e Gharib
- Hasht Behesht

== Books ==
- Man va Nazi
- Setareh
- Goldan va Aftab
- Payambar-e Bi Ketab
- Del-e Shir
