= Alihan Samedov =

Azerbaijani musician (born 1964)

Alihan Samedov Əlixan Səmədov
- Born: 27 April 1964 (age 61); Sumgait, Azerbaijan SSR, Soviet Union
- Genres: Azerbaijani folk
- Instruments: balaban, clarinet, tutek, zurna, oboe, saxophone

Alihan Samedov (Azerbaijani: Əlixan Səmədov, pronounced [æliˈxɑn sæmæˈdov]; born 27 April 1964) is an Azerbaijani musician known for playing wind instruments and Azerbaijan folk instruments.

Alihan Samedov was born in Sumgait, Azerbaijan SSR in 1964. Descending from a musician family, he completed his first and secondary education between the years 1971 and 1979. He received his music education at the Samad Vurghun and Nariman Narimanov music school. In 1986 he entered the applied teaching school of Azerbaijan State Pedagogy University and graduated from the same in 1990. He is the master player of wind instruments (balaban, clarinet, tutek, zurna, oboe, saxophone). He is a chess master. He is currently teaching chess at Erenkoy First School and he is the Music Directors of Kadikoy Folklore Education Centre. Folk Dances Department of Eyuboglu Educational Institutions. Istanbul Caucasus Dance Company as well as the person in charge of Azerbaijani Music at Samanyolu TV's (STV) Music and Entertainment Programs. In his albums Samedov presents the instrument the balaban with his own interpretation. The album, titled Balaban, is released by Mega Music.

== Artistic activities ==
- 1988 Germany - Azerbaijan Cultural Festival
- 1990 Antalya - Golden Orange Festival
- 1991 France - National Lion Festival
- 1994 France - Amneville Folk Dances Festival
- 1994 Ankara - ITU TMDK Concerts
- 1995 Gaziantep - G.Antep Conservatory Festivities
- 1995 Istanbul - ITU TMDK Concerts
- 1996 Poland - Zakopane Folk Dances Festival
- 1997 Spain CIUDAD Folk Dances Festival
- 1998 Istanbul - Istanbul Culture Festival
- 1998 Poland - Olsztyn Folk Dances Festival
- 1999 Şırnak - OHAL Region Culture Festival
- 2000 Kırıkkale - 3rd Turkish World Festival
- 2001 Spain - CIUDAD Folk Dances Festival
- 2001 Singapore - Turkish week

== Awards ==
- 1993 Istanbul / Folk Dances -The Best Music
- 1996 Poland - The Best Music & The Best Musician
- 1997 The "Milliyet" Newspaper Special Awards
