= Kamil Jalilov =

Azerbaijani musician (1938–2022)

- Born: Kamil Jalil oğlu Jalilov; 29 January 1938; Buzovna, Baku, Azerbaijani SSR, USSR
- Died: 22 February 2022 (aged 84) Baku, Azerbaijan
- Genres: Azerbaijani Folk Music, Mugham
- Occupations: Composer; Songwriter
- Instruments: Oboe
- Years active: 1953–2022

Kamil Jalil oğlu Jalilov (Azerbaijani: Kamil Cəlil oglu Cəlilov; 29 January 1938 – 22 February 2022) was an Azerbaijani musician known for his master expertise playing wind instruments and national folk instruments.

He was the master player of wind instruments such as oboe and Azerbaijani regional folk instruments.

== Biography ==
In 1953, Jalilov started to perform at the age of 15 after being inspired by the local man. After finishing local school number 176, he joined the Asaf Zeynally Music School in Baku and then graduated from Azerbaijan State Conservatory.

During 1970 to 1988, as a musician, he toured with concert performances in Egypt, Italy, Poland, India, Lebanon, Syria, and many other countries in Europe, Asia and Africa. He is the author of "Azərbaycan təranələri" traditional folk song on oboe.

In 2013, he received the Shohrat Order from President of Azerbaijan Ilham Aliyev for his contribution to the development of performing arts.

Jailov died on 22 February 2022, at the age of 84.

== Legacy ==
A Radio Moscow recording of Jalilov playing mugham on the balaban was included on the Voyager Golden Record attached to the Voyager spacecraft. It is the only Azerbaijani song included among many cultural achievements of humanity.

== Filmography ==
- 1997: Kamil (Kamil)

== Discography ==
- Azərbaycanım (Nurla Sabah, 2008)
