= Fethi Zghonda =

Tunisian musician and composer

- Occupation: Musician

Fethi Zghonda is a Tunisian musician, composer, and conductor.

Zghonda served as Secretary-General and Director of Music at the Ministry of Culture and Tourism Tunisia in the 1980s.
