= Bab'Aziz =

- Directed by: Nacer Khemir
- Written by: Tonino Guerra; Nacer Khemir
- Starring: Parviz Shahinkhou; Maryam Hamid; Hossein Panahi; Nessim Khaloul; Mohamed Graïaa; Maryam Mohaid; Golshifteh Farahani
- Music by: Armand Amar; Abacus Consult; Bulgarian Symphony Orchestra; Naïve; SIF309 Film & Music Productions
- Production company: Behnegar
- Distributed by: Bavaria Film International; Typecast Releasing; Trigon-Film
- Release date: 8 October 2005
- Running time: 98 minutes
- Countries: Iran; Tunisia
- Languages: Tunisian Arabic; Persian; Hindi
- Box office: $263,447

Bab'Aziz: Le prince qui contemplait son âme (English: Bab'Aziz: The prince who contemplated his soul), often abbreviated to Bab'Aziz, is a 2005 film by Tunisian writer and director Nacer Khemir. It stars Parviz Shahinkhou, Maryam Hamid, Hossein Panahi, Nessim Khaloul, Mohamed Graïaa, Maryam Mohaid and Golshifteh Farahani. It was filmed in Iran and Tunisia.

== Summary and themes ==
The film's complex and nonlinear narrative chiefly centers around the journey of a blind dervish, Bab'Aziz (Parviz Shahinkhou), and his granddaughter, Ishtar (Maryam Hamid), who — while traveling across the desert towards an immense Sufi gathering — encounter several strangers who relate the stories of their own mysterious and spiritual quests.

Bab'Aziz is the third part of Khemir's "Desert Trilogy", which also comprises his 1984 Les baliseurs du désert (Wanderers of the desert) and 1991 Le collier perdu de la colombe (The dove's lost necklace). The three films share structural elements and themes drawn from Islamic mysticism and classical culture, as well as an isolated desert setting.

Bab'Aziz is particularly concerned with Sufi themes. Khemir has stated that he wished to show, in the film, "an open, tolerant and friendly Islamic culture, full of love and wisdom . . . an Islam that is different from the one depicted by the media in the aftermath of 9/11", and that the unusual structure of the film was a deliberate attempt to imitate the structure of Iranian Sufi visions and dances, aimed at allowing the spectator to "forget about his own ego and to put it aside in order to open up to the reality of the world".

== Cast ==
- Parviz Shahinkhou as Bab'Aziz
- Maryam Hamid as Ishtar
- Hossein Panahi as red dervish
- Nessim Khaloul as Zaid
- Mohamed Graïaa as Osman
- Golshifteh Farahani as Nour
- Soren Mehrabiar as dervish

== Reception ==
=== Box office ===
Bab'Aziz has grossed $263,447 worldwide.

=== Critical response ===
Bab'Aziz received mixed reviews from critics. Review aggregator Rotten Tomatoes reports that 58% of 24 critics have given the film a positive review. Boston Globe critic Michael Hardy found fault with Khemir's "well-meaning attempt to correct Western misconceptions of Islam", complaining that the film "is set in the present, but resolutely ignores current events in favor of pervasive nostalgia for the glorious past". However, Matt Zoller Seitz of The New York Times praised it as "a structurally audacious fairy tale that imparts moral lessons and shows how narratives reflect and shape life". According to The Hollywood reporter reviewer Frank Scheck " What 'Bab' Aziz' lacks in narrative clarity it makes up for in visual and musical splendor, and the fact that its co-screenwriter is Tonino Guerra". He added that the movie is better experienced on a big screen.

== Bibliography ==
- Firoozeh Papan-Matin. "Nacer Khemir and the Subject of Beauty in Bab'Aziz: The Prince Who Contemplated His Soul," Cinema Journal. Fall 2012, 52:1, 52:1, pp. 107–26.
- Bab'Aziz - Nacer Khemir (2005), The Film Sufi, 06/12/201
- Bab'Aziz, Plume-noire, Damien Panerai (in French), Access date: 27 May 2022
