= Guan (instrument) =

Musical instrument

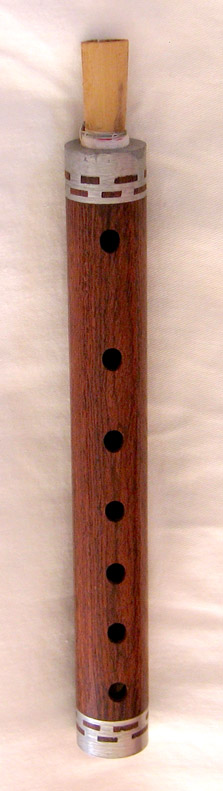
Northern Chinese hardwood guanzi

The guan (Chinese: 管; pinyin: guǎn; lit. 'pipe', 'tube') is a Chinese double reed wind instrument. The northern Chinese version is called guanzi 管子 or bili (simplified Chinese: 筚篥; traditional Chinese: 篳篥) and the Cantonese version is called houguan (喉管). It is classified as a bamboo instrument in the Ba Yin (ancient Chinese instrument classification) system. Unlike other instruments in the double-reed family of woodwinds which mostly have conical bores, such as the Chinese suona or the Western oboe, the guan has a cylindrical bore, giving its distinctive mellow, yet piercing buzz-like timbre.

== History ==
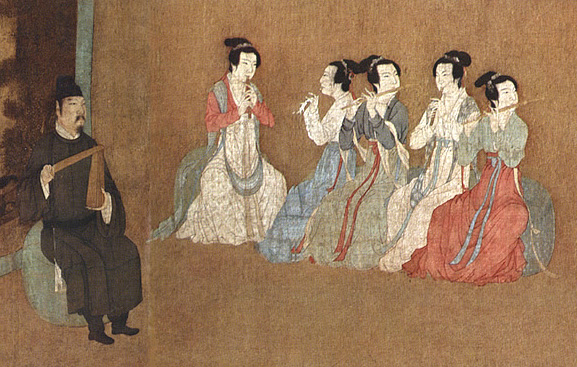
Detail of 12th century Song dynasty painting depicting three guan (double-reed pipe) players and two dizi (transverse flute) players, accompanied by a paiban (wooden clapper), performing in the home of Han Xizai, a minister to the Song dynasty emperor Li Houzhu

The earliest use of the word guan can be traced back to Zhou dynasty records, where it refers to end-blown bamboo flutes such as the xiao or paixiao. The earliest double-reed instrument appears in the late Zhou dynasty and is referred as hújiā (胡笳; 'reed pipe of Hu people') because it had been introduced from the northwestern region of China. During that time, the hujia was used as the primarily military instrument for signaling, and is depicted in early Chinese poetry as raucous and barbaric.

The guan was developed after the hujia in the Tang dynasty due to the flourishing music and art culture that were influenced by the Silk Road trade. Like the hujia, it was likely adopted from whom the Chinese generally call the Hu (nomadic) people, and became an important leading instrument in the court and ritual music. At the height of the Tang dynasty, the guan, alongside many other instruments was introduced to neighboring countries, where the guan's descendants (called piri in Korea and hichiriki in Japan) are still used today.

However, in subsequent dynasties, the guan fell out of use in court music but became very popular in folk ensembles. It plays an important part in the wind-and-percussion (chuida or guchui) ensembles that play on traditional festivals and celebratory occasions and is still popular in the wind band music of northern China, as well as in some other Chinese regions. In the Beijing opera orchestra, the guan is used to depict military scenes along with the suona and other percussion instruments.

== Construction ==
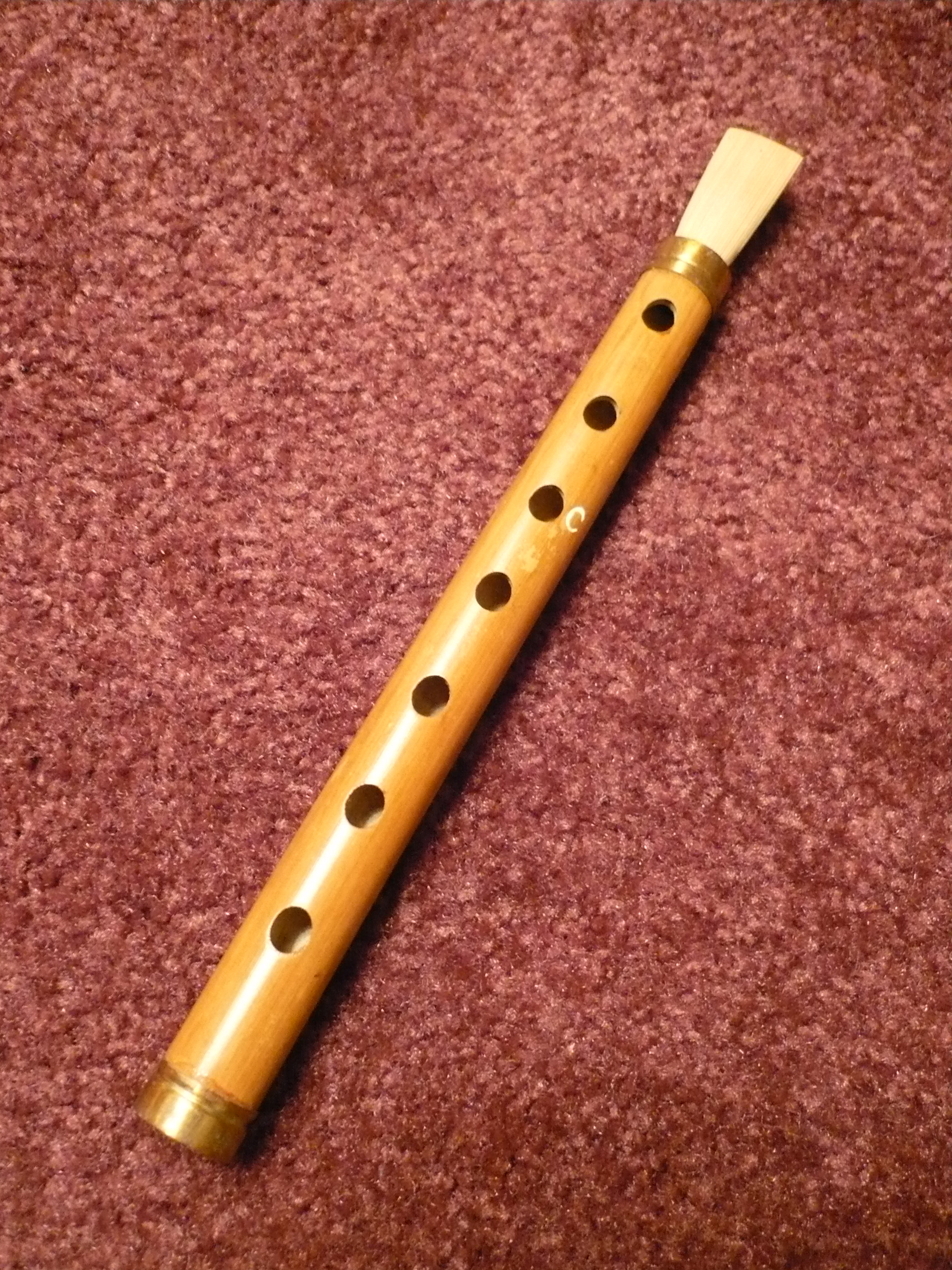
A small Cantonese houguan in the key of C

The guan consist of a short cylindrical tube made of hardwood in northern China, where the instrument is called bili. In the Guangdong region of southern China, it is made from bamboo and is called houguan (喉管; literally "throat guan"). It was originally used by street vendors but became incorporated into the Cantonese opera orchestra beginning in the 1920s. By the 1950s it had become popular throughout Guangdong and larger sizes were developed. Hardwood guans use and require a hard reed, whereas bamboo guans normally use a soft reed (however, sometimes a different hardness is used to change the timbre.)

An instrument called the ah-bó-ta̍t-á (鴨母噠仔), o͘-ta̍t-á (烏笛仔), or Táiwān guǎn (台湾管), which is similar to the houguan, is also found in Taiwan. This Taiwanese guan is often used in the Taiwanese opera orchestra. Like the Cantonese houguan, it comes in three sizes, each of which has a small brass bell to increase its volume, and does not overblow, giving it a register of just over one octave.

Traditionally, the guan has seven finger holes on the top and one thumb hole on the back. The length of a traditional guan varies from 7 inches (18 cm) to 13 inches (33 cm), or up to 50 cm for a large Cantonese houguan.

The Cantonese houguan is available in three sizes; the medium and large sizes have a small brass bell at the end. The northern guanzi comes in various keys. The two standard higher versions are in soprano and alto range, although there is also a notable piccolo version called shuangguan, which is small enough that it is commonly played side by side in harmony by one person taking advantage of "plumber's grip" with both reeds in the mouth simultaneously. Other than the houguan, other common bamboo guan include the yamudi of Taiwan, the luguan of Hunan, the bili of northern China, the Uyghur pipi, and the xibili of the Korean autonomous region. The only other guanzi hardwood versions also exist in northwest China that share a similarity to the Armenian duduk and Turkish mey.

In the 20th century, modern versions of the guan were developed in China. These modernized guan, which may be as long as a Western clarinet, have more tone and key holes and are fitted with metal keys to provide a wider and fully chromatic range. Such instruments are used primarily in large Chinese orchestras. These modern keyed guanzi are typically used for tenor and baritone ranges respectively. Although these jiajian (keyed) instruments are made of hardwood, their design originates from the houguan and their key system is related to clarinet's Boehm system with, typically with a short or no bell. While in theory these instruments can have a range as wide as the clarinet, they are generally considered to sound best in the lowest two octaves (due to the immense difficulty in controlling the Clarion register). In recent years, many models of traditional soprano Guanzi come fitted with one or more keys to improve the intonation of certain chromatic notes.

All guan have a large, wide double reed made from either Phragmites reed or Arundo cane, which is inserted into the top end of the tube. Varieties of guan that do not overblow the octave (such as the houguan) typically have reeds made from Phragmites, while those that do overblow the octave (such as the northern guanzi) have reeds made from Arundo.

Typical ranges of the members of the modernized keyed orchestral guan family:

- Small guan (xiaoguanzi) in D, C, and B♭ (sopranino)
- Middle guan (zhongguanzi) in A, G, and F (soprano)
- Big Guan (daguanzi) in D (alto) often called the "da D"
- Alto Keyed Guan (zhongyinguan) in C (tenor range; a misnomer), which has a fingering very similar to Clarinet in C.
- Bass Keyed Guan (diyinguan) in G (baritone range; a misnomer), which is notated in sounding pitch
- Double Bass Keyed Guan (beidiyinguan) in C (bass range; a misnomer), which has a fingering very similar to Clarinet in C, but notated in sounding pitch.

Note that the English names for these have yet to be fully standardized worldwide.

== Playing ==
Due to its advanced overblowing technique the northern guanzi's range is about two and one-half octaves, while the Cantonese houguan (like the bamboo guan used in ancient China) does not overblow, giving it a range of just over one octave. The keyed "jiajian guan" with the addition of clarinet-like register and extension keys have nearly a 4 octave range, although the upper range is not commonly used. The guan has been used in a variety of musical contexts over the centuries, often as a solo instrument used to evoke a mood of sadness. This is largely due to the instrument's playing technique, which involves the use of expressive vibratos and wide pitch bends.

The guan is quite difficult to play, largely due to the difficulty of controlling the embouchure; a Chinese saying states that "the sheng (mouth organ) takes 100 days to learn, but the guan takes 1,000 days to learn."

== Notable players ==
- Yang Yuanheng (1894–1959)
- Hu Zhihou (胡志厚)
- Wu Xiaozhong (呉暁鐘)
- Bao Jian (鮑健, student of Hu Zhihou)
- Han Lei
- Li Jinwen (born 1923)
- Liu Zhong
- Shan Wentong
- Lo Wai-leung (Guan Principal of Hong Kong Chinese Orchestra)
- Ren Zhaoliang
- Qin Jitao

== See also ==
- Traditional Chinese musical instruments
- Balaban
- Duduk
- Hichiriki
- Piri
