= The Dove's Lost Necklace =

- Directed by: Nacer Khemir
- Written by: Nacer Khemir
- Produced by: Tarak Ben Ammar
- Starring: Navin Chowdhry; Walid Arakji
- Cinematography: Georges Barsky
- Music by: Jean-Claude Petit
- Release date: 21 February 1991
- Running time: 86 min
- Country: France
- Language: Arabic

The Dove's Lost Necklace (French: Le collier perdu de la colombe) is a 1991 French/Tunisian drama film directed by Nacer Khemir. It is the second film in Khemir's Desert Trilogy.

== Plot ==
The movie is set in Medieval Spain. It features Hassan, a student of calligraphy in 11th Century Andalucía. Being the naïve young student he is, Hassan seeks love through books and poetry. He comes across a fragment of a page from a book of poems and becomes obsessed with finding the rest, believing it holds the secrets of love. In his quest to find the lost bits of the manuscripts, Hassan acquires the help of child protagonist Zin.

== Cast ==
- Navin Chowdhry - Hassan
- Walid Arakji - Zin
- Ninar Esber - Aziz
- Noureddine Kasbaoui - Calligrapher
- Jamil Joudi - Giaffar
- Sonia Hochlaff
