= Nacer Khemir =

Tunisian filmmaker and writer

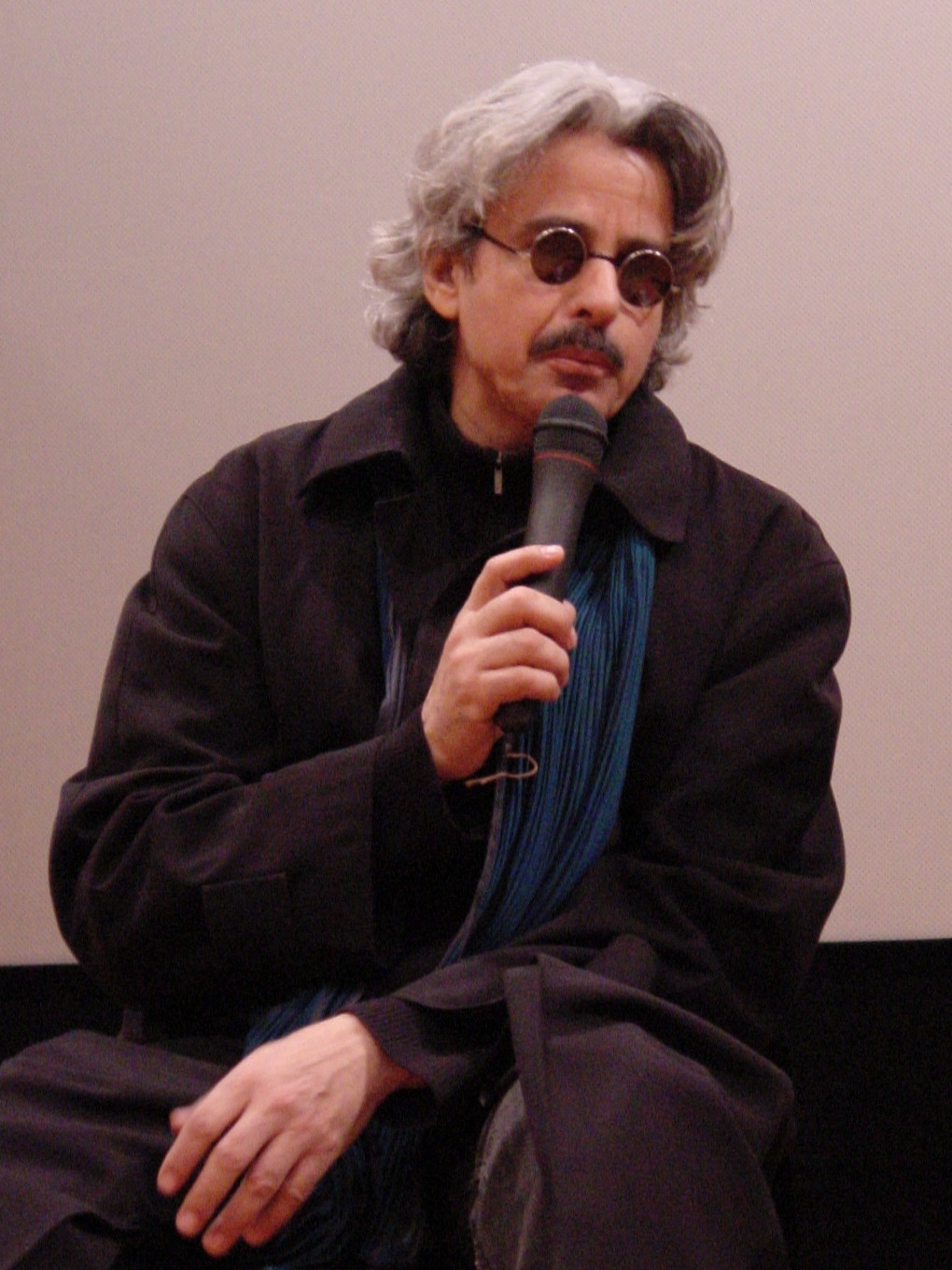
- Born: 1948 (age 77–78); Korba, Tunisia
- Notable work: Les baliseurs du désert (Wanderers of the Desert)

Nacer Khemir (Nacer Khémir, Arabic: ناصر خمير), born in 1948 in Korba, Tunisia, is a Tunisian filmmaker.

== Biography ==
From an early age, Khemir was fascinated by classical Arabic culture and by storytelling. He has cited One Thousand and One Nights as a particular influence, saying, "I am a child of these stories." However, in spite of this interest and a similar, lasting passion for film, Khemir initially planned a career as a painter and sculptor - a path he has, throughout his life, continued to pursue; his art has been exhibited at, among other institutions, the Centre Pompidou and the Museum of Modern Art in Paris.

In 1966, at the age of eighteen, he was awarded a UNESCO fellowship to study film in Paris. In 1975, he completed his first film, L’Histoire du pays du Bon Dieu (The History of God's Country), shot in his hometown of Korba and featuring the desert setting and spiritual overtones that would figure prominently in his later work.

Released in 1984, his first feature film, Les baliseurs du désert (Wanderers of the Desert), garnered international acclaim. The film, which tells the story of a schoolteacher's arrival in a strange and haunting desert town, was awarded the Grand Prix at the Festival des Trois Continents.

Khemir's second feature, Le collier perdu de la colombe (The Dove's Lost Necklace), was released in 1991. The dialogue of the film is in Classical Arabic. Its narrative, reminiscent of a fairy tale, concerns a young calligrapher in Al-Andalus who embarks on a quest to find the missing fragments of a manuscript that he believes will reveal to him the secrets of love. Le collier perdu de la colombe was the recipient of several awards, including a Special Jury Prize at the Locarno International Film Festival.

Les baliseurs du désert and Le collier perdu de la colombe are considered to form the first two parts of a "Desert Trilogy." The third part, Bab'Aziz: le prince qui contemplait son âme (Bab'Aziz: The Prince Who Contemplated His Soul) was released in 2005. Bab'Aziz tells the story of an elderly dervish who, accompanied by his young granddaughter, encounters several mysterious strangers as he journeys to a large and joyful Sufi gathering in the desert. Khemir has described Bab'Aziz as "a highly political film, and deliberately so," saying:

"I would explain it with this allegory: if you are walking alongside your father and he suddenly falls down, his face in the mud, what would you do? You would help him stand up, and wipe his face with your shirt. My father’s face stands for Islam, and I tried to wipe Islam’s face clean with my movie, by showing an open, tolerant and friendly Islamic culture, full of love and wisdom . . . an Islam that is different from the one depicted by the media in the aftermath of 9/11."

The film was co-produced by eight countries, including Germany, France, Switzerland, and Iran. It was the recipient of a Golden Dagger at the Muscat Film Festival.

In addition to his work as an artist and filmmaker, Khemir has performed as a storyteller at the Théâtre national de Chaillot, and has produced work for Swiss, French, and Tunisian television. He is the author of a number of books, including several for children.

== Filmography ==
- Les baliseurs du désert (Wanderers of the Desert), 1984 (also known as El Haimoune)
- Le collier perdu de la colombe (The Dove's Lost Necklace), 1991
- Bab'Aziz: le prince qui contemplait son âme (Bab'Aziz: The Prince Who Contemplated His Soul), 2005

== Published work ==
- Le chant de génies, 2001
- J’avale le bébé du voisin, 2000
- La grand-mère, le juge et la mouche, 2000
- Le livre des djinns, 2000
- L’alphabet des sables, 1998
- Paroles d’Islam, 1994
- Sheherazade, 1987
- Grand-père est né, 1985
- Le conte des conteurs, 1984
- Le sommeil emmure, 1978
- L'ogresse, 1975

== Awards and honors ==
- Prix Henri Langlois, 2007
- East-West Coexistence Award, Beirut Film Foundation, 2006
- Prix Spécial du Jury, Locarno International Film Festival, 1991
- Grand Prix, Belfort International Film Festival, 1991
- Prix de la Première Œuvre, Carthage Film Festival, 1984
- Grand Prix, Festival des Trois Continents, 1984
- Palme d'Or and Premier Prix de la Critique, Mostra de Valencia, 1984
