= Hichiriki =

Musical instrument

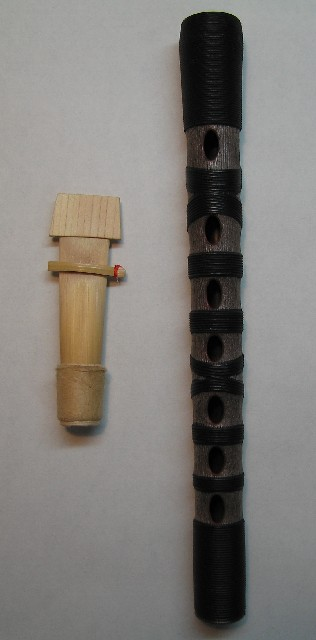
- Classification: Double reed

Related instruments
- Duduk; Guan; Piri

The hichiriki (篳篥) is a double reed Japanese fue (flute) used as one of two main melodic instruments in gagaku music. It is one of the "sacred" instruments and is often heard at Shinto weddings in Japan. Its sound is often described as haunting.

The hichiriki is derived from the Chinese guan, which was imported into Japan during the Tang dynasty. According to scholars, the hichiriki emerged after the 12th century when the popularity of the Chinese melodies in Japan called tōgaku waned.

== Description ==
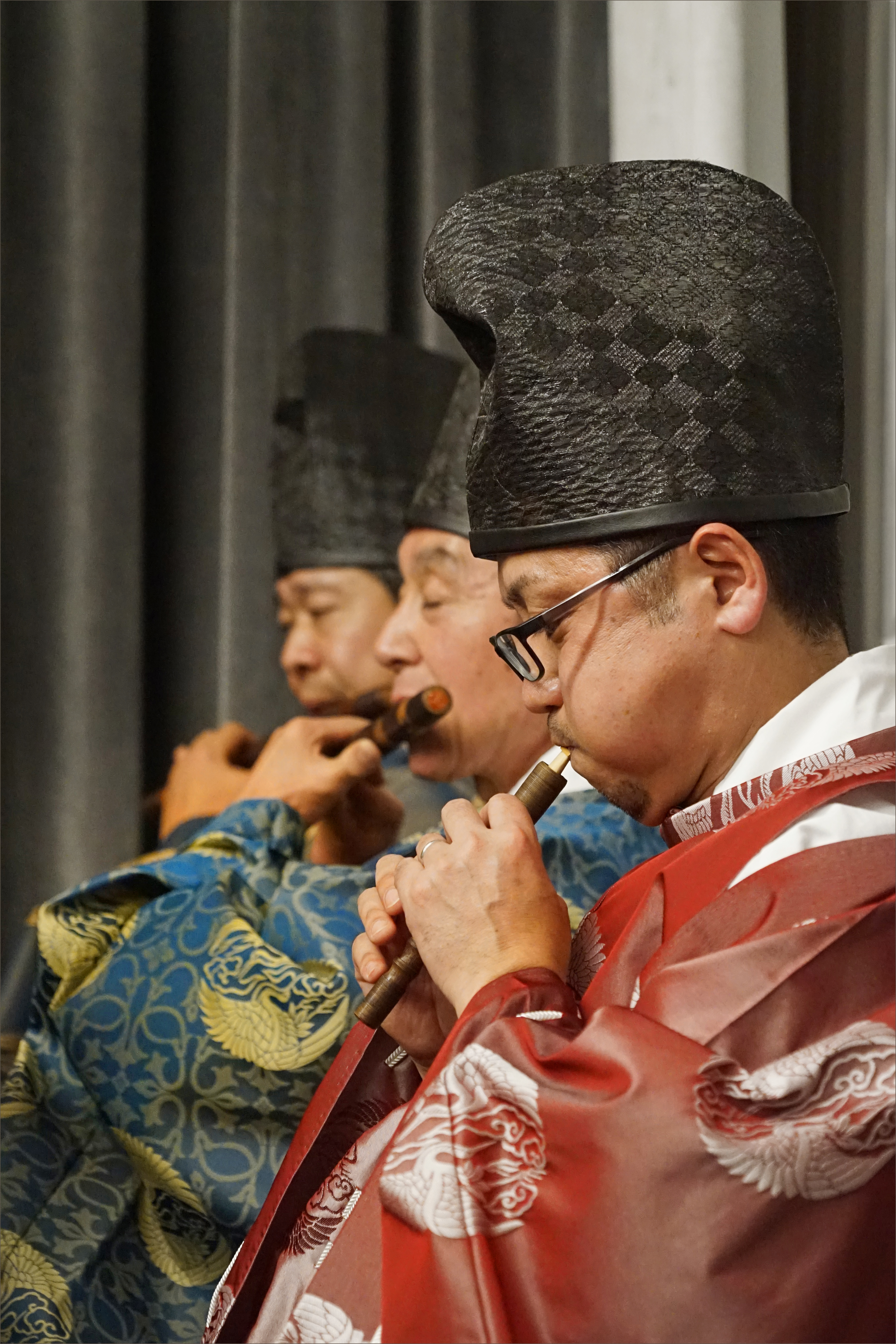
Gagaku musician playing hichiriki

Although a double reed instrument like the oboe, the hichiriki has a cylindrical bore and thus its sound is similar to that of a clarinet. It is difficult to play due in part to the double reed configuration. It is made of a piece of bamboo that measures 18 centimetres (7.1 in) with a flat double reed inserted which makes a loud sound.

Pitch and ornamentation (most notably bending tones) are controlled largely with the embouchure. The instrument is particularly noted for the embai ("salted plum seasoning"), a kind of pitch-gliding technique.

The hichiriki is the most widely used of all instruments in gagaku and it is used in all forms of music aside from poetry recitation. The hichiriki is derived from the Chinese guan or bili, and is also related to the Korean piri. This is evident in the notations of the finger positioning, a tablature of signs derived from Chinese characters.

Notable Japanese musicians who play the hichiriki include Hideki Togi.

Non-Japanese musicians who have learned to play the hichiriki include Alan Hovhaness, Richard Teitelbaum, Valerie Samson, Thomas Piercy and Joseph Celli.
