= Piri (instrument) =

Traditional Korean musical instrument

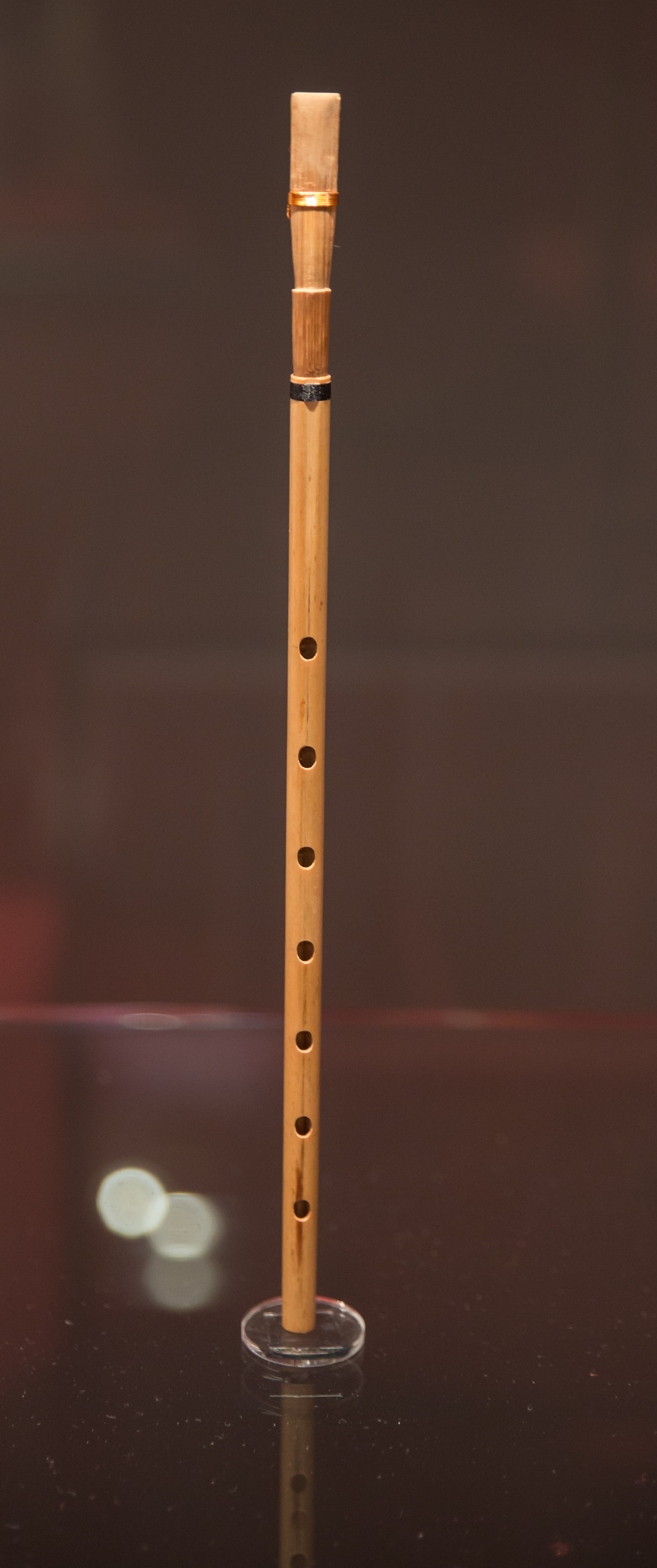
- A Sepiri

Korean name
- Hangul: 피리
- RR: piri
- MR: p'iri

Japanese name
- Kanji: 篳篥・觱篥
- Kana: ヒチリキ
Transcriptions
- Romanization: hichiriki

Chinese name
- Chinese: 觱篥
Transcriptions
Standard Mandarin
- Hanyu Pinyin: bìlì

The piri (Korean: 피리) is a Korean double reed instrument, used in both the folk and classical (court) music of Korea. Originating in Central Asia, it was introduced to the Korean peninsula from China, and has been used there as early as the Three Kingdoms period in the states of Goguryeo and Baekje. The instrument consists of a tube of bamboo, which is perforated with finger holes, and has a large double reed. It has a cylindrical bore.

A typical piri has eight finger holes, seven of which are on the front, with the remaining one on the back for the thumb.

There are several types of piri:

1. Hyangpiri (향피리; 鄕피리; lit. 'village piri')
2. Sepiri (세피리; 細피리; lit. 'thin piri')
3. Dangpiri (당피리; 唐피리; lit. 'Chinese piri')
4. Daepiri (대피리; 大피리)
5. Jeo piri (저피리; 低피리)

There are different types of piri, each suited for use in a different type of music. The Hyangpiri is the longest and most common form of piri. Because of its loud and nasal tone, it usually plays the main melody in an ensemble. The sepiri is the smaller, thinner, and much quieter one. Additionally, because of its quiet tone, it is used along with voices or soft stringed instruments. The Dangpiri (Tang piri) is wider and is similar to the Chinese guanzi. Additionally, the North Korean daepiri is a modernized piri with keys and a bell, looking much more like a Western oboe. The jeo piri is a modernized piri with clarinet-like keys, in the contrabass register, which was developed in North Korea in 1962.

In general, the method of playing the piri is to sit upright, pull the chin slightly, straighten the back to make it easier to breathe, hold the flute in both hands, and bite it in mouth.

The piri is believed to have been introduced to Korea from Kucha, a Buddhist oasis state of Central Asia (modern-day Xinjiang) before the Goguryeo period. According to the Book of Sui, the piri was also known as gagwan (가관; 笳管), and it originates from Kucha. During the reign of King Yejong of Goryeo dynasty, another double-reed cylindrical instrument was imported from Song dynasty China, and to disambiguate, the former was named hyangpiri and the latter dangpiri. The sepiri is smaller than the hyangpiri, but has the same structure and range. The sepiri appears to have been invented much later than the hyangpiri.

The piri's equivalent in China is the guan (also known as bili), and its counterpart in Japan is the hichiriki.

== See also ==
- Traditional Korean musical instruments
