= Ginting =

Ginting is one of a clans of Karo-Batak people from the island of Sumatra, Indonesia. People of this clan bears the clan's name as their surname. Notable people of this clan include:

- Anthony Sinisuka Ginting (born 1996), Indonesian badminton player
- Antonius Ginting (born 1965), Indonesian politician
- Djamin Ginting (1921–1974), Indonesian military officer
- Elias Ginting (born 1956), Indonesian diplomat
- Lyodra Ginting (born 2003), Indonesian singer

== See also ==
- Genting (disambiguation)
