= Daniel Simanjuntak =

Indonesian diplomat (born 1972)

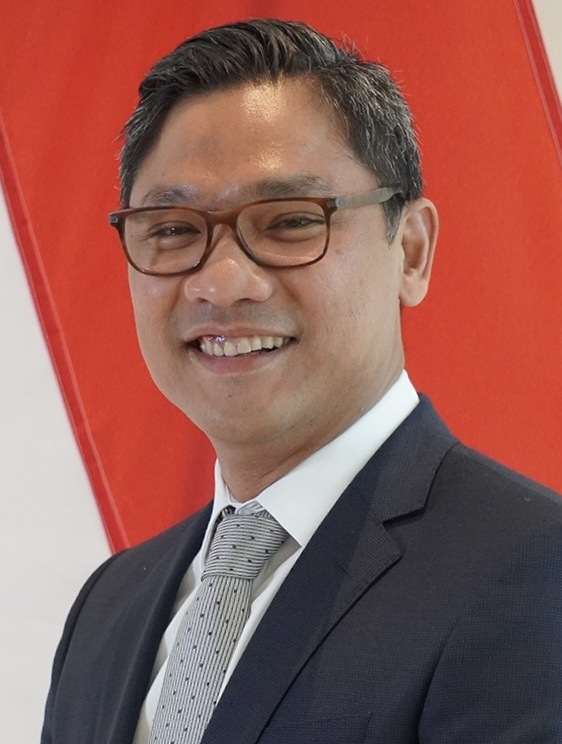

Director General of Economic Relations and Development Cooperation
- Incumbent
- Assumed office 17 September 2025
- Preceded by: Makarim Wibisono (2002)

Ambassador of Indonesia to Canada
- In office 17 November 2021 – April 2025
- President: Joko Widodo; Prabowo Subianto
- Preceded by: Abdul Kadir Jailani
- Succeeded by: Muhsin Syihab

Personal details
- Born: November 6, 1972 (age 53)
- Spouse: Tricia Malonda
- Education: University of Indonesia (S.Sos., M.Si.); Portsmouth University (MA); Erasmus University (LL.M)

Daniel Tumpal Sumurung Simanjuntak (born 6 November 1972) is an Indonesian diplomat who is currently serving as director general of economic relations and development cooperation in the foreign ministry since 2025. Prior to his appointment, he served as ambassador to Canada and director for Africa.

== Education ==
Born on 6 November 1972, Simanjuntak attended the Jakarta 6th State High School. Simanjuntak received his bachelor of political science and masters in international relations from the University of Indonesia in 1996 and 2000, respectively. He furthered his education abroad, earning an MA from Portsmouth University in England in 2002, followed by an LL.M from Erasmus University in the Netherlands in 2004.

== Career ==
Daniel Simanjuntak being interviewed by Antara TV on his career in 2019.

He began his career as a civil servant candidate at the foreign ministry after passing the entrance exam in 1996, officially joining the ministry in October 1997. Throughout his career, he has held various diplomatic positions. As a junior diplomat in the Netherlands, he managed political issues related to bilateral relations and international organizations such as the International Court of Justice and the Organisation for the Prohibition of Chemical Weapons. His second assignment was at the permanent representative to the UN in New York, where he focused on issues concerning peacekeeping forces and disarmament. From 2011 to 2014, he served at the economic section of the embassy in Washington D.C. with the rank of minister counsellor. On 3 January 2017, Daniel was appointed as the director of Africa region within the foreign ministry.

In June 2021, Daniel was nominated by President Joko Widodo as ambassador for Canada, with concurrent accreditation as a representative to the International Civil Aviation Organization. Upon passing an assessment by the House of Representative's first commission in July, he was installed as ambassador on 17 November. He presented his credentials to Secretary General of the ICAO Juan Carlos Salazar Gómez on 16 February 2022 and Governor General of Canada Mary Simon on 27 April 2022. During his tenure, Daniel led the initiative to finalize a bilateral trade agreement with Canada by 2024. In August 2024, Daniel was nominated by President Joko Widodo as ambassador to China, but he was never summoned for a fit and proper test by the House of Representatives for the office. He left his ambassadorial post in April 2025.

On 17 September 2025, Daniel was installed as the director general of economic relations and development cooperation in the foreign ministry. The new directorate general was formed in December 2024 to strengthen international economic relations and improve coordination in foreign economic affairs.

== Personal life ==
Simanjuntak is married to Tricia Malonda who hails from Kakas in North Sulawesi. The couple met in high school.
