= Juan Carlos Salazar =

Juan Carlos Salazar may refer to:

- Juan Carlos Salazar (musician), Venezuelan singer and cuatro player
- Juan Carlos Salazar Gómez, secretary-general of the International Civil Aviation Organization
