= Muhsin Syihab =

Indonesian diplomat (born 1970)

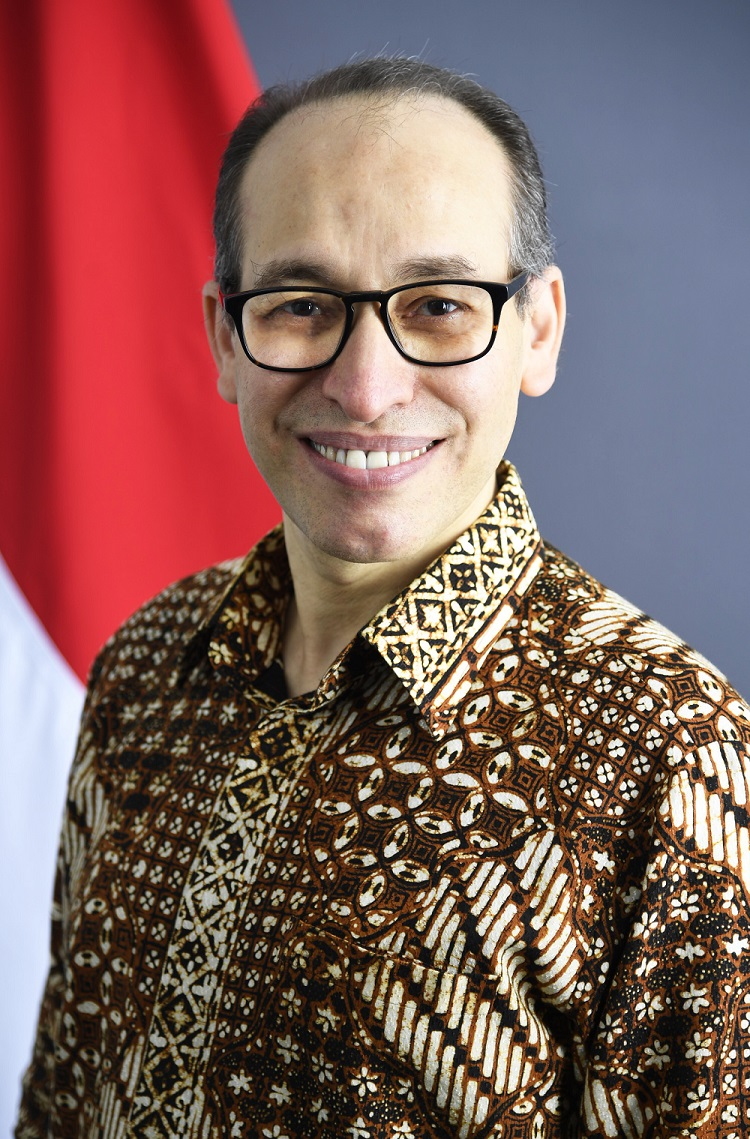

Ambassador of Indonesia to Canada and ICAO
- Incumbent
- Assumed office 24 March 2025
- President: Prabowo Subianto
- Preceded by: Daniel Simanjuntak

Personal details
- Born: June 5, 1970 (age 56) Sumenep, East Java, Indonesia
- Spouse: Mariam Rahmania
- Education: Gadjah Mada University

Muhsin Syihab (born 5 June 1970) is a career diplomat who is currently serving as ambassador to Canada, with concurrent accreditation as a permanent representative to the International Civil Aviation Organization (ICAO), since 2025. Prior to this appointment, he held the position of senior advisor (expert staff) to the foreign minister for inter-institutional relations.

== Early life and education ==
Born on 5 June 1970, in Sumenep, East Java, Muhsin initially aspired to become a physician. However, his ambition shifted to diplomacy after he became captivated by the work of former Indonesian foreign ministers, Mochtar Kusumaatmadja and Ali Alatas, whose views on foreign policy in various forums greatly impressed him. In 1989, he began studying international relations at the Gadjah Mada University. During his time as a student activist, he was influenced by his intensive discussions with and the high integrity of his lecturers and senior students, including academicians such as Ichlasul Amal, Mochtar Mas'oed, Amien Rais, and Yahya Muhaimin. He also took an active role in the Sumenep Friendship Forum (FORSIP).

== Career ==
Muhsin joined the foreign ministry in March 1996. In 2009, Muhsin was assigned to the economic section of the permanent representative to the United Nations in Geneva with the rank of first secretary, where he arrived on 29 May 2009. During his tenure, Indonesia was elected as one of the members of the High Level Taskforce (HLT) on Global Framework for Climate Services and as leader of the G77+China group in the UN Trade and Development. He was promoted to the rank of counselor sometime between 2012 and 2013 before leaving Geneva in late 2013.

Upon returning to Jakarta, Muhsin was named as deputy director (chief of subdirectorate) for sustainable development within the foreign ministry. On 21 November 2016, Muhsin became the director for development, economics, and environment within the foreign ministry. He was later appointed as deputy permanent representative of Indonesia to the United Nations in New York, responsible for matters relating to the security council. He achieved a significant milestone in 2020 by successfully passing a resolution on "women and peace keeping" at the UN Security Council. This historic resolution was the first in Indonesia's history since becoming a non-permanent member of the UN Security Council to pass a resolution and the first UN Security Council resolution to focus on female peacekeeping forces. The resolution's objective is to ensure equality between male and female peacekeepers and to address local issues specifically related to women. Additionally, his diplomatic team successfully passed a resolution aimed at combating terrorism. He also became the security council's president for a month in August 2020.

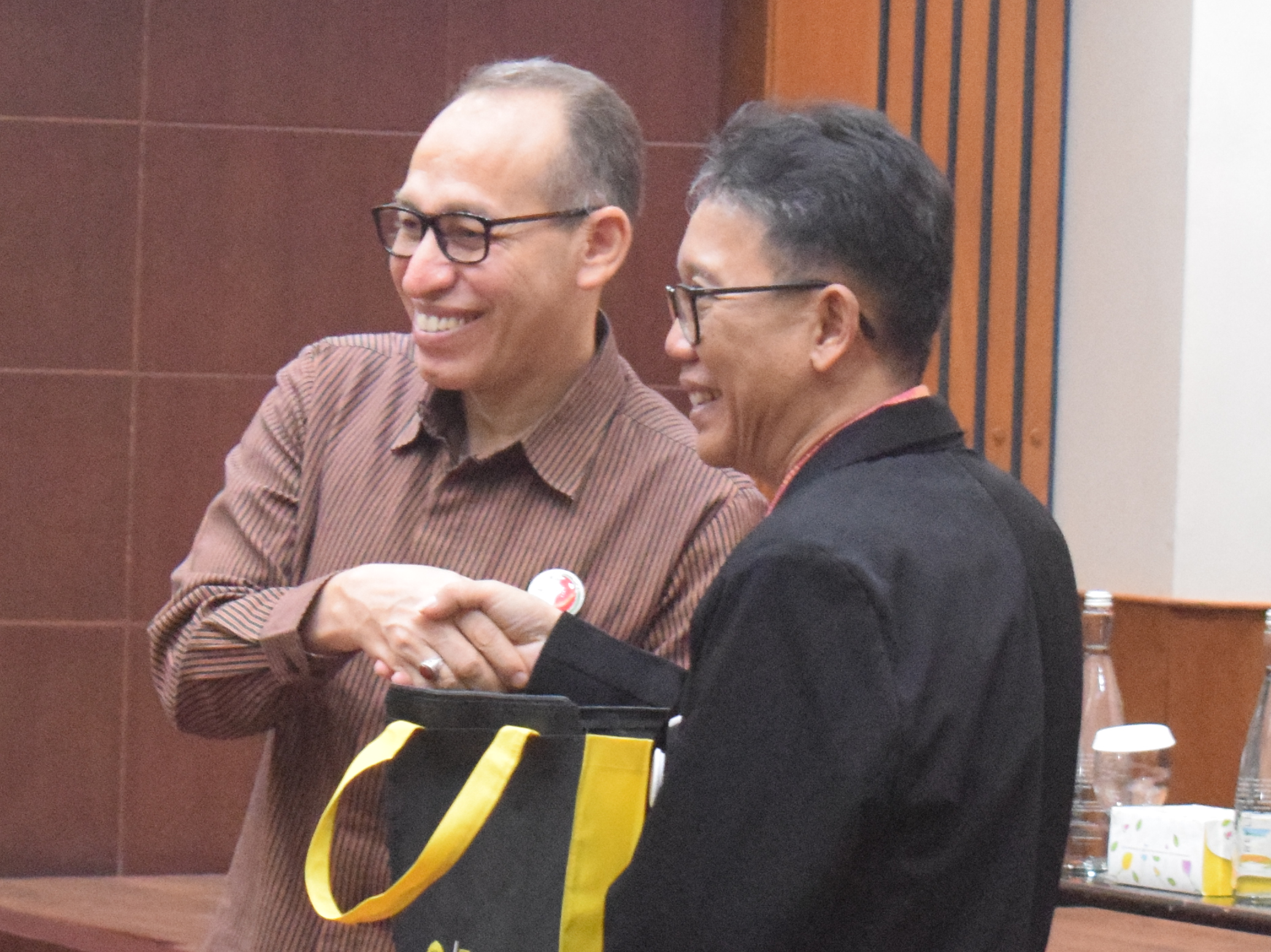
Muhsin, as the minister's senior advisor, with dean of the University of Indonesia Faculty of Social and Political Sciences Semiarto Aji Purwanto.

On 27 October 2020, Muhsin was installed as the minister's senior advisor (expert staff) for inter-institutional relations. He returned to Jakarta to assume his duties in January 2021. During his tenure, he led the Indonesian delegation in the fourth Conference of Parties (COP4) to the Minamata Convention on Mercury in March 2022. He introduced the Bali Declaration on Combating Illegal Trade of Mercury, which is non-binding and aims to promote international cooperation to curb illegal mercury trade.

In August 2024, President Joko Widodo nominated Muhsin as Indonesia's ambassador to Canada, with concurrent accreditation to the ICAO. He passed a fit and proper test held by the House of Representative's first commission in September that year and was installed by President Prabowo Subianto on 24 March 2025. His appointment marked his first assignment to Canada, as he had never visited Canada before.

Shortly after his installation, he and five other new ambassadors from UGM met with UGM rector Ova Emilia and Yogyakarta governor Hamengkubuwono X. In April 2025, Muhsin held several meetings with various groups, including journalists, to gather input for his new assignment. He arrived on 29 June 2025 and presented his credentials to Secretary General of ICAO Juan Carlos Salazar Gómez on 3 September 2025 and to the Governor General of Canada Mary Simon on 15 September 2025.

== Personal life ==
Muhsin is married to Mariam Rahmania.
