= Zelda Wulan Kartika =

Indonesian diplomat (born 1970)

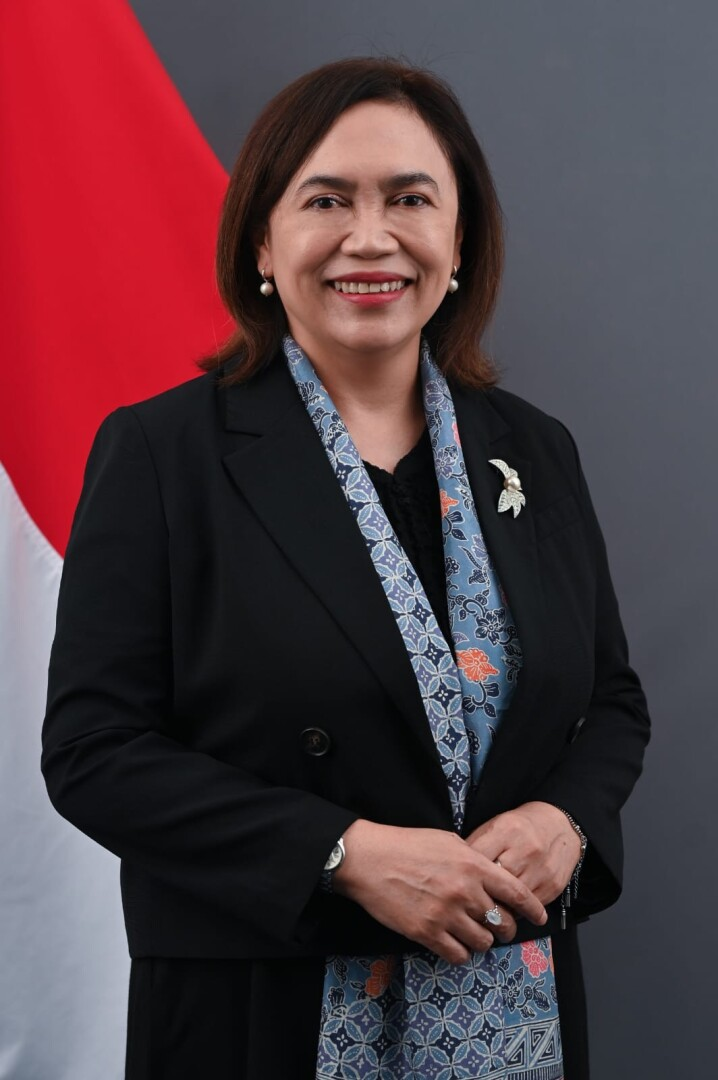

Director General of Asia, Pacific, and Africa
- Acting
- In office November 2025 – 18 December 2025
- Preceded by: Abdul Kadir Jailani
- Succeeded by: Santo Darmosumarto

Personal details
- Born: August 7, 1970 (age 56)
- Education: Gadjah Mada University (S.I.P); University of Indonesia (M.Si.)
- Occupation: Diplomat

Zelda Wulan Kartika (born 7 August 1970) is an Indonesian diplomat who is currently serving as the foreign minister's advisor for economic diplomacy since 17 September 2025. Previously, she was the deputy chief of mission at the embassy in South Korea from 2021 to 2025.

== Early life and education ==
Born on 7 August 1970, Zelda completed her undergraduate studies in international relations at the Gadjah Mada University in 1997. She pursued master's studies on the same subject at the University of Indonesia in 2002.

== Career ==
Zelda began her career as a diplomat in March 1998. From 2004 to 2007, Zelda was assigned to the embassy in Warsaw, where she handled matters relating to culture and information, with the rank of third secretary, and later second secretary. In 2010, Zelda was posted at the political section of the embassy in Washington, D.C. with the rank of first secretary. He was promoted to counsellor in 2014.

Zelda then returned to the foreign ministry's headquarters, where from 2015 to 2017 she served as the deputy director (chief of subdirectorate) for weapon of mass destruction and conventional weapon. On 12 January 2018, Zelda became the foreign ministry's director of America I, with responsibilities covering relations with North, Central America, and West Caribbean countries.

Zelda was posted as deputy chief of mission to the embassy in Seoul in June 2021. Following the departure of ambassador Gandi Sulistiyanto, on 3 November 2023 Zelda became the embassy's chargé d'affaires ad interim. Zelda served as chargé d'affaires ad interim until 7 July 2025. On 17 September 2025, Zelda was installed as the foreign minister's advisor for economic diplomacy. Following the appointment of director general of Asia, Pacific, and Africa Abdul Kadir Jailani as ambassador to Germany, Zelda became the acting director general in November 2025.
