= Nurhadi Djazuli =

Indonesian diplomat (born 1948)

Ambassador of Indonesia to Nigeria and Ghana
- In office 29 March 2005 – 2008
- President: Susilo Bambang Yudhoyono
- Preceded by: Moezdan Razak
- Succeeded by: Sudirman Haseng

Personal details
- Born: May 1, 1948 (age 78) Pekalongan, Central Java
- Spouse: Maesaroh Nurhadi-Zaeni

Nurhadi Djazuli (born 1 May 1948) is an Indonesian intelligence officer and diplomat who was Indonesia's ambassador to Nigeria from 2005 to 2008. He served at the state intelligence agency, with his last position as the principal secretary of the agency from 2001 to 2003 and deputy for domestic cooperation from 2003 to 2004. Nurhadi was implicated in the murder of Munir Said Thalib during his latter tenure.

== Early life and career ==
Born in Pekalongan, Central Java on 1 May 1948, Nurhadi joined the state intelligence coordinating agency (BAKIN, Badan Koordinasi Intelijen Negara) shortly after receiving his doctorandus. During his tenure, he was assigned as an intelligence officer at the Indonesian embassy in Vienna with the diplomatic rank of second secretary from 1986 to 1990. He held a number of important posts in BAKIN, including as the chief of BAKIN's data processing center and the chief of directorate for domestic politics investigation. After BAKIN was renamed to BIN (Badan Intelijen Negara, State Intelligence Agency) in 2001, Nurhadi became the first principal secretary of the new agency. As principal secretary, Nurhadi was the most senior civil servant in the agency and was responsible in coordinating administrative affairs. He was later reassigned as the sixth deputy of the agency, with responsibilities for domestic cooperation, from 2003 to 2004.

== Munir assassination ==
Nurhadi was implicated in the murder of human rights activist Munir Said Thalib, as he allegedly recruited Munir's murderer, Pollycarpus Priyanto, into BIN and provided him with a firearm permit. Nurhadi denied these allegations in a press interview and refused to be investigated by the fact-finding team on Munir's death regarding the matter, stating that only the police have the authority to do so. The fact-finding team chair, Marsudi Hanafi, stated that Nurhadi's refusal to be investigated was an insult to the president, as the fact-finding team operated under presidential approval. As a result of his uncooperative behavior, foreign minister Hassan Wirajuda delayed Nurhadi's departure to Lagos for his appointment as ambassador to Nigeria, with concurrent accreditation to Ghana. Nurhadi was approved for the position in January 2005 and was sworn in on 29 March 2005. After Nurhadi rejected the investigation invitation, both the national police chief and the president urged him publicly to comply with the statement.

The fact-finding team signed a cooperation protocol with BIN on 2 May 2005 which allowed the team to investigate BIN's internal affairs and investigate BIN members. The protocol prevented further alibi from Nurhadi to evade investigation. However, Munir's lawyer Sudjono stated that Munir still would not fulfill the call as he believed the protocol was in contradiction with the presidential decree that formed the fact-finding team. Sudjono's statement sparked harsh criticism from the House of Representatives, with some members proposing Nurhadi to be dismissed from his ambassadorship. Eventually, on 9 May, Nurhadi complied and was investigated for two hours by the fact-finding team, which solidified their hypothesis of BIN's involvement in Munir's assassination. Two days later, the police questioned Nurhadi, in which he denied any relations with Pollycarpus. Nurhadi was investigated for a second time on 18 May, although an attempt at a third investigation in June failed due to disagreements in the location.

== Ambassador to Nigeria and Ghana ==
Nurhadi commenced his ambassadorial duties in mid-2005, with him presenting his credentials to President Olusegun Obasanjo of Nigeria on 5 August 2005 and to President John Kufuor of Ghana from 29 March 2006. In June 2008, Nigeria foreign minister Ojo Maduekwe negotiated the repatriation of two Nigerians who were on death row for drug-related crimes to Nurhadi. Nurhadi's ambassadorial term ended around this time.

== Personal life ==
Nurhadi is married to Maesaroh Nurhadi-Zaeni.
