= Abdul Kadir Jailani =

Indonesian diplomat (born 1966)

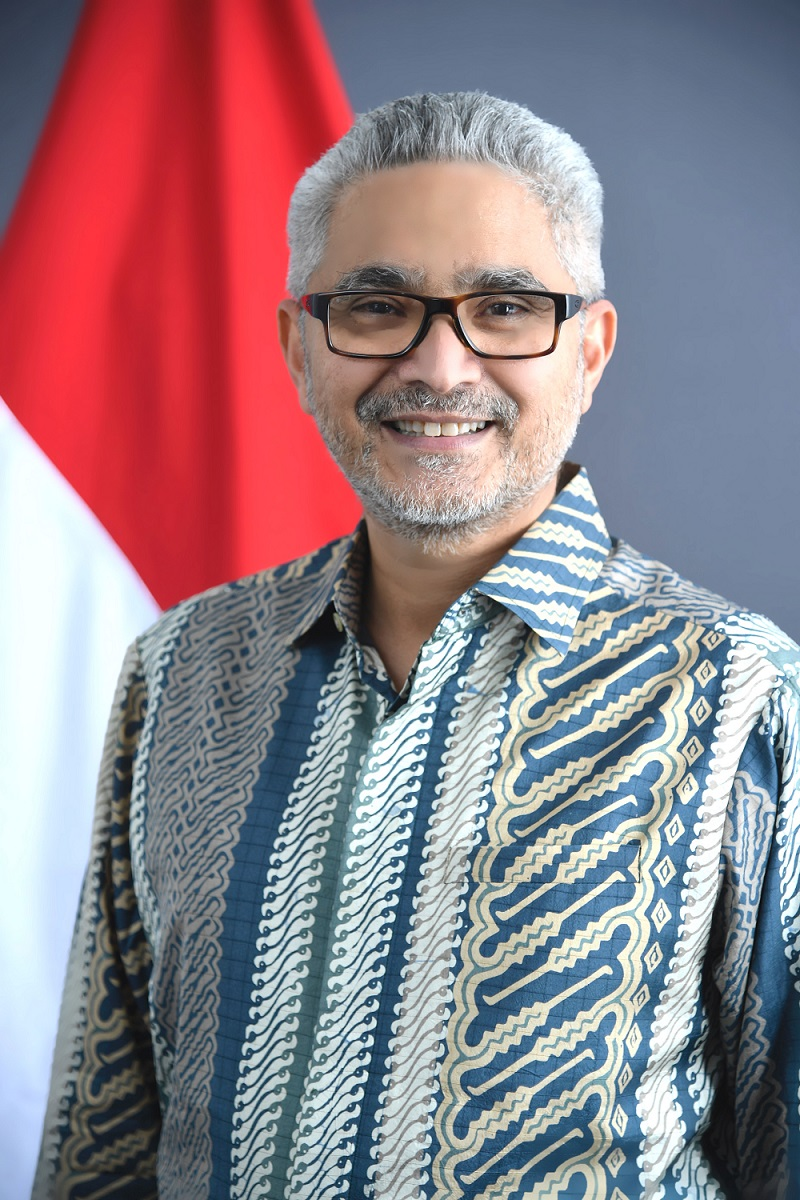

Ambassador of Indonesia to Germany
- Incumbent
- Assumed office 25 August 2025
- President: Prabowo Subianto
- Preceded by: Arif Havas Oegroseno

Chief of the Foreign Policy Strategy Agency
- Acting
- In office 24 March 2025 – 17 September 2025
- Preceded by: Yayan Ganda Hayat Mulyana
- Succeeded by: Muhammad Takdir

Director General of Asia, Pacific, and Africa
- In office 27 October 2020 – November 2025
- President: Joko Widodo; Prabowo Subianto
- Preceded by: Desra Percaya
- Succeeded by: Zelda Wulan Kartika (acting); Santo Darmosumarto

Ambassador of Indonesia to Canada
- In office 7 January 2019 – January 2021
- President: Joko Widodo
- Preceded by: Teuku Faizasyah
- Succeeded by: Daniel Simanjuntak

Personal details
- Born: March 18, 1966 (age 60) Surabaya, East Java, Indonesia
- Spouse: Rahmayanti Hamid
- Children: 2
- Relatives: Hamid Alhadad (father-in-law)
- Education: Jember University (moved); Airlangga University (S.H.); University of Indonesia (M.H.); University of Portsmouth (MA)

Abdul Kadir Jailani (born 18 March 1966) is an Indonesian diplomat who is currently serving as the Ambassador of the Republic of Indonesia to Germany in Berlin. Previously, he served as the Director general of Asia, Pacific, and African Affairs at the Ministry of Foreign Affairs of the Republic of Indonesia (2020-2025). He previously served as consul general in New York and the Indonesian ambassador to Canada and ICAO.

== Early life and education ==
Abdul was born in Surabaya on 18 March 1966. Abdul described himself as a rowdy student who was not academically bright, and he spent five years in high school after failing to advance twice. He was known for skipping classes and struggled with mathematics, but excelled in history and general knowledge, believing that the education system at the time did not accommodate his interests. He was motivated by his father's advice to "at least become a law graduate or something," and was interested in law since junior high school, despite having no family members in the legal or diplomatic fields. His decision to study law was met with disbelief by his teachers, who announced his admission to the University of Jember during a flag ceremony.

Abdul studied law the University of Jember for four semesters before transferring to the Airlangga University in 1988, where he completed his undergraduate studies on the same subject in 1992. During his studies, Abdul was active in the student senate and the Indonesian Law Students Senate Association, and chose to specialize in international civil law. He also improved his English skills a year before graduating after his father advised him that being able to speak English would lead to a better-paying job, even as a driver.

Abdul continued to be active in the university's alumni association, running as a candidate for the university's alumni association chairman in 2021. The law faculty branch, which initially endorsed Abdul, withdrew their endorsement, as Abdul's distance from the university would complicate coordination and organizational effectiveness. Abdul eventually joined the alumni's association board of executives for the 2025-2030 period as the chair of internationalization department.

During his early career in the foreign ministry, Abdul earned a master's degree in economic law from the University of Indonesia in 1997 with a thesis on the Southeast Asian Nuclear-Weapon-Free Zone Treaty. He received a second master's degree through a joint Dutch-British program in European law and policy from the University of Portsmouth in 2002 while serving in the Netherlands. He began a doctoral program at the University of Indonesia in 2005, but had to leave for a diplomatic assignment at the permanent representative in Geneva before he could finish his education.

== Early diplomatic career ==
Upon graduating, Abdul was admitted to practice law, but he joined the foreign ministry instead in March 1993. After completing junior diplomatic training, he was assigned to the directorate of international treaties, spending most of his career focusing on political and security matters. From 1993 to 1998, he was involved in negotiations for the establishment of the International Criminal Court and other legal issues within ASEAN.

From 1998 to 2001, Abdul was assigned to the embassy in The Hague to head the embassy's foreign political section with the rank of third secretary. After completing his master's degree, he returned to Indonesia to serve as the chief of transnational crime and extradition law section within the directorate of political, security, and territorial treaties from 2002 to 2003. In 2006, he was sent to the permanent mission to the United Nations in Geneva where he served at the political section. On the same year, he was transferred to the political section of the permanent mission to the United Nations in New York, serving as a member of Indonesia's UN Security Council task force. He reached the diplomatic rank of counsellor during his assignment in New York. Throughout his overseas assignment, he handled various foreign issues such as negotiations for a nuclear-free zone in ASEAN and the Sipadan-Ligitan dispute. He is a strong critic of legal positivism, arguing that law is a matter of social life, not just legal texts.

In 2010, he returned to Jakarta to serve as the deputy director (chief of subdirectorate) for political and security treaties, handling international legal issues related to politics and security. Two years later, he was appointed director for economic and socio-cultural Treaties, where he was involved in negotiations for various free trade agreements, investment protection, and the creation of international legal instruments for the protection of genetic resources, traditional knowledge, and folklore. During his tenure in the foreign ministry's legal and treaties directorate general, Abdul was involved in negotiating the code of conduct for South China Sea between 2011 and 2012, ASEAN Enhanced Dispute Settlement Mechanism and Bilateral Comprehensive Economic Partnership between Indonesia and several countries between 2013 and 2016. He was elected in 2014 as the vice chairman of the Intergovernmental Committee of WIPO on Genetic Resources, Traditional Knowledge and Folklore, serving until 2016. He was also credited for helping free 60 Indonesians who faced the death penalty in Saudi Arabia and was involved in creating the agreement on the Protection of Indonesian Domestic Workers between Indonesia and Saudi Arabia in 2014.

== Consul general in New York ==
Abdul in an interview with the Voice of America, 2018.

On 23 August 2016, Abdul became the consul general in New York, with responsibilities covering northeastern and southeastern U.S. states. During his tenure, he had to face illegal Indonesian immigrant who resisted deportation and managing the temporary storage of a deceased Indonesian citizen's ashes before they could be sent home. Jailani was responsible for promoting national economic growth and boosting economic ties through exhibitions and participation in promotional events such as IMEX America 2016.

== Ambassador to Canada ==
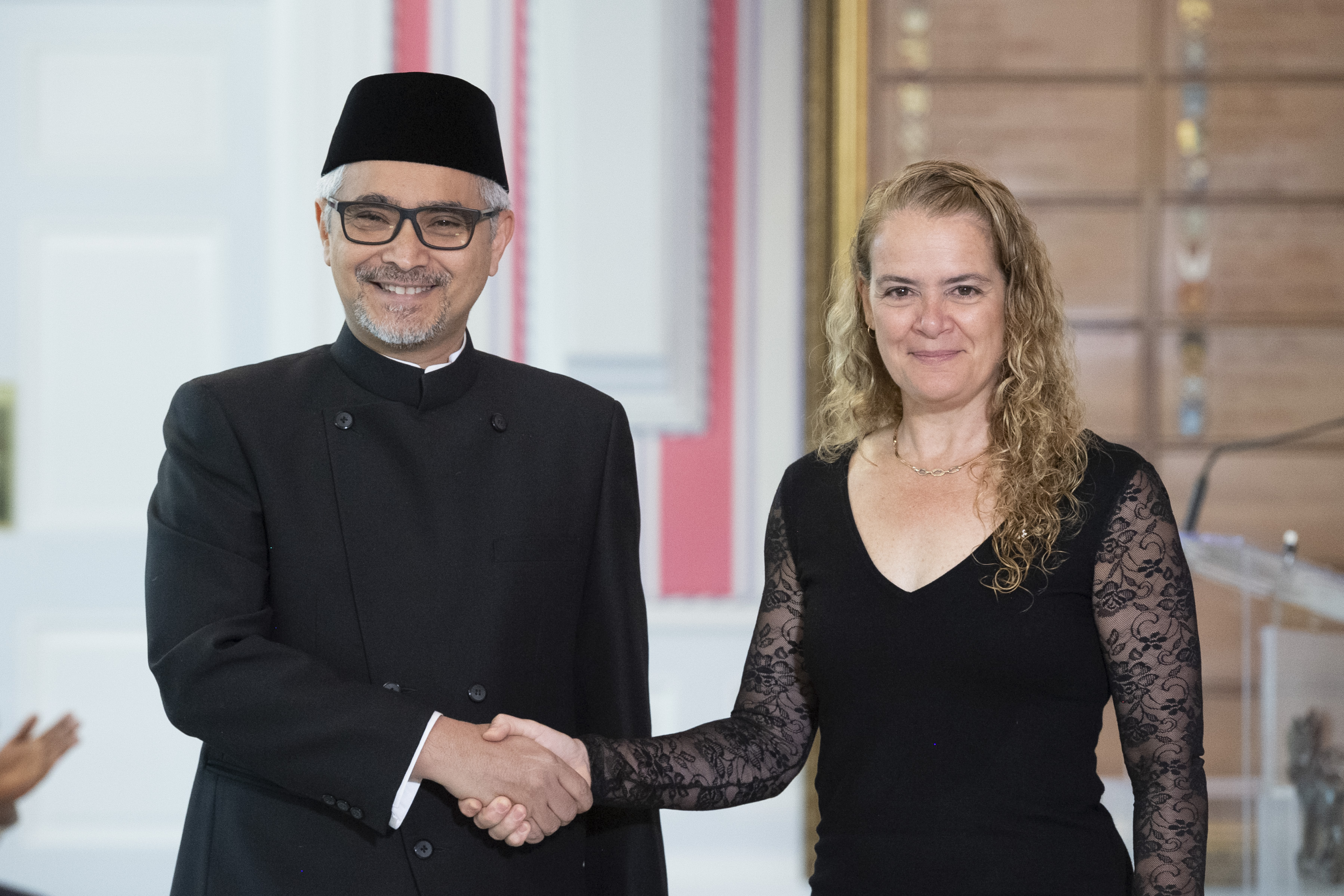
Abdul after presenting his credentials to Governor-General Julie Payette.

In September 2018, President Joko Widodo named Abdul as a nominee for ambassador to Canada, with concurrent accreditation as a representative to the International Civil Aviation Organization. After passing an assessment held by the House of Representative's first commission in October, on 7 January 2019 he was installed as ambassador. He presented his credentials to the Secretary General of the International Civil Aviation Organization Fang Liu on 23 May 2019 and Governor General of Canada Julie Payette on 28 May 2019. Several months after presenting his credentials, Abdul stated his focus on improving trade ties between the two nations through free trade agreement. Abdul pushed for the implementation of the ASEAN-Canada Free Trade Agreement through discussions and introduced ASEAN's Indo-Pacific Outlook to Canada.

== Director general of Asia, Pacific, and Africa ==
On 27 October 2020, Abdul was installed as director general for Asia, Pacific, and Africa in the foreign ministry. He is tasked with enhancing and maintaining bilateral relations in the region, with a primary focus on economic diplomacy. As director general, Abdul reaffirmed Indonesia's refusal to establish diplomatic ties to Israel in the midst of Israel's attempt to establish ties with Southeast Asian nations. In the midst of the COVID-19 pandemic in Indonesia, Abdul signed an agreement with the ambassador to Japan in Indonesia on the provision of COVID-19 vaccines.

Regarding AUKUS, Abdul shared his concern on the development of nuclear-powered submarines by Australia that might set a precedent as it is first Non-Proliferation Treaty country to do so. He stated that AUKUS could set a precedent for less powerful countries to pursue nuclear technology. However, he also pointed out it didn't violate the Southeast Asian Nuclear Weapons Free Zone. Abdul recommended building mutual trust between countries on AUKUS through dialogues and forums.

Shortly following the 2021 Taliban offensive, Indonesia closed its embassy in Kabul as it refused to recognize the Taliban rule in the country. Abdul later conducted a meeting with the deputy chief of the Taliban's political office in Doha Salam Hanafi to ensure Indonesia's commitment to peacebuilding in Afghanistan and maintaining security for Indonesia's embassy in Kabul. In December that year, Abdul announced Indonesia's plan to reopen its embassy in Kabul as a way to conduct constructive engagement with the Taliban regime through humanitarian assistance and scholarships. Abdul later lamented Taliban's decree on the civil rights of women, which he described as far from the expectations of the international community. During the course of 2022, Abdul oversaw the provision of $2.85 million aid package from Indonesia for women's empowerment and education in Afghanistan and hosting of the International Conference on Afghan Women's Education to raise awareness on the matter.

During his tenure, the directorate of Central Asia and Pacific under him was split into the Central Asia directorate and the Pacific and Oceania directorate. The split was intended to accommodate the domestic politic dynamics in Pacific countries and part of broader efforts to strengthen the foreign ministry's internal diplomatic infrastructure, in line with the government's Pacific elevation policy. In 2025, Abdul accompanied foreign minister Sugiono on his visit to North Korea, marking the first visit by Indonesia's foreign minister to the country since 2013.

== Ambassador to Germany ==
Abdul was nominated for ambassador to Germany by President Prabowo Subianto in July 2025. After being assessed by the House of Representative's first commission on 5 July, his nomination was approved by the House of Representatives in a session three days later. Matters relating to the protection of Indonesian citizens, Indonesia's free and active foreign policy, and the implementation of President Prabowo's eight goals (Astacita) became the focus of his assessment. Abdul was installed along with seven other ambassadors on 25 August 2025. On 5 December 2025, Abdul received his duties as ambassador from chargé d'affaires ad interim Fajar Wirawan Harijo. He presented his credentials to the president of Germany Frank-Walter Steinmeier on 19 December 2025.

== Personal life ==
Abdul is married to Rahmayanti Hamid and has two sons. He has a passion for reading philosophy books and also enjoys swimming and photography.
