= Harry Purwanto =

Indonesian diplomat (born 1955)

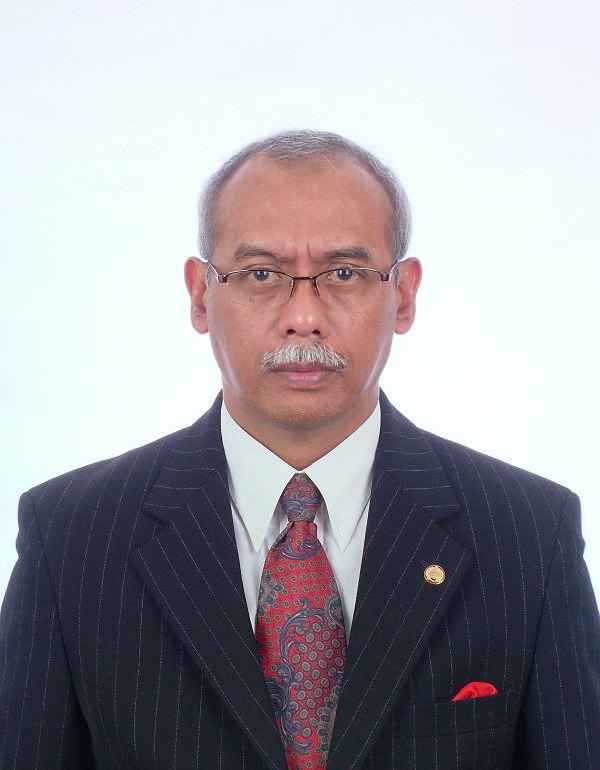

Ambassador of Indonesia to Nigeria
- In office 15 October 2014 – 2019
- Preceded by: Sudirman Haseng
- Succeeded by: Usra Hendra Harahap

Ambassador of Indonesia to Finland
- In office 8 April 2008 – 2011
- Preceded by: Iris Indira Murti
- Succeeded by: Elias Ginting

Personal details
- Born: 12 May 1955 (age 71) Nganjuk, East Java, Indonesia
- Spouse: Lilik Purwanto
- Children: 3
- Education: Gadjah Mada University (S.H.)
- Profession: Diplomat

Harry Purwanto (born 12 May 1955) is an Indonesian diplomat who served as ambassador to Finland from 2008 to 2011 and ambassador to Nigeria from 2014 to 2019. Between his two ambassadorial tenures, he was the deputy for international cooperation in the National Counterterrorism Agency. He was a career foreign service officer in the foreign department, holding various positions within the foreign department central office and representatives abroad such as the deputy chief of mission of the embassy to the U.S. and director for North and Central America.

== Early life and education ==
Harry was born in Nganjuk, a regency in East Java, on 12 May 1955. He studied law at the Gadjah Mada University and graduated in 1981. He briefly worked as a section chief within the legal division of Hutama Karya, a state owned construction company, from 1982 to 1983 before applying for the foreign department.

== Diplomatic career ==
Harry began his career as a foreign service officer upon completing his basic diplomatic education, which lasted for a year from 1983 to 1984. His first assignment was as a staff at the secretariat of the directorate general of protocol and consular affairs. He underwent his first overseas assignment as a political staff at the permanent mission to the United Nations in New York in 1986, where he worked for five years. By his second year in the mission, he was reassigned as a press officer.

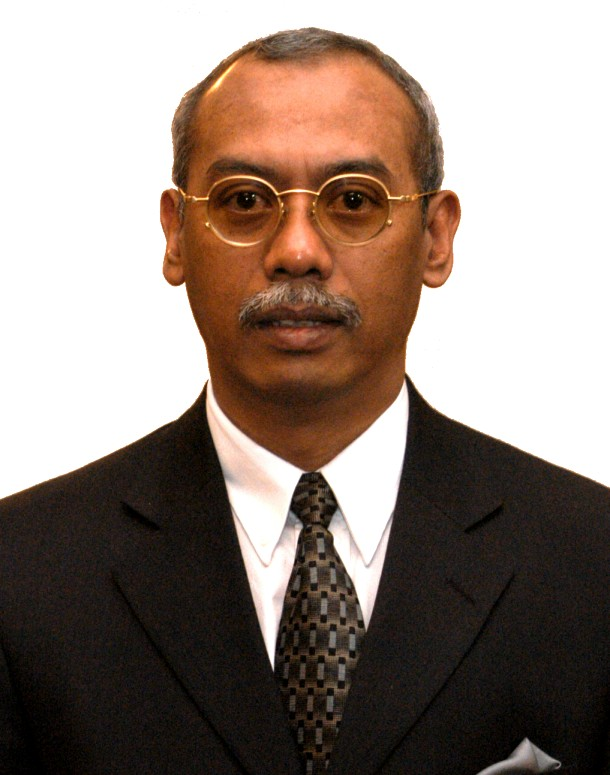
Harry Purwanto as deputy chief of mission of the Indonesian embassy in the U.S.

Upon returning to Indonesia in 1991, he was appointed as the chief of administration to the foreign department's bureau of senior advisors. In 1994, he was sent to the embassy in Berlin, where he was assigned to the press and information section. Between 1998 and 2001, he coordinated the human rights task force within the foreign department's directorate of international organizations in his capacity as the deputy director for human rights and sciences. His multilateral expertise grew further in September 2001 when he was appointed as the chief of political affairs at Indonesia's mission to the United Nations in Vienna, where he also chaired the G-77 task forces on the matter in 2002. He served in the United Nations Commission on Human Rights. In October 2002, he was appointed as the deputy chief of mission at the embassy in Washington D.C.

On 28 December 2005, Harry was named as the director of North and Central America in the foreign department. In 2007, Harry successfully negotiated Indonesia's debt to the U.S. to be swapped for tropical forest conservation programs. On 26 November 2007, Harry underwent an assessment by the House of Representative's first commission for his nomination as the ambassador to Finland and Estonia by the president. After passing the assessment, he was sworn in on 8 April 2008 and presented his credentials to president Tarja Halonen of Finland on 23 May 2008 and to president Toomas Hendrik Ilves on 5 June 2008. Shortly prior to his departure from the position, on 26 May 2011 Harry was conferred the Commander Grand Cross Order of the Lion of Finland by Halonen for his role in strengthening bilateral relations through government and non-government cooperations. Harry was then appointed as the deputy for international cooperation in the National Counterterrorism Agency, in which he chaired Asia-Pacific Economic Cooperation's task force for counterterrorism during Indonesia's 2013 chairmanship of the organization. Under Harry's leadership, the task force produced fourteen different decision, including on shrinking the gap between each country's ability to handle counterterrorism and the elevation of the task force into a working group.

On 15 October 2014, Harry was sworn as ambassador for the second time, this time being based in Abuja. He was appointed to represent Indonesia in Nigeria, with concurrent accreditation to Benin, Burkina Faso, Gabon, Ghana, Cameroon, Republic of the Congo, Liberia, Niger, São Tomé and Príncipe, Togo, and the Economic Community of West African States. Harry stated his focus on preventing Indonesian citizens in his accreditation countries, especially in Liberia, from catching Ebola. He presented his credentials to president Goodluck Jonathan of Nigeria on 3 March 2015, president Ellen Johnson Sirleaf of Liberia on 25 June 2015, president John Mahama of Ghana on 11 August 2015, president Faure Gnassingbé of Togo on 11 January 2016, president Patrice Talon of Benin on 14 June 2016, president Roch Marc Christian Kaboré of Burkina Faso on 21 July 2016, and president Denis Sassou Nguesso of the Republic of the Congo on 2 March 2017. Harry's ambassadorial tenure ended in 2019.

== Personal life ==
Harry is married to Lilik and has three children.
