= Yayan Ganda Hayat Mulyana =

Indonesian diplomat (born 1966)

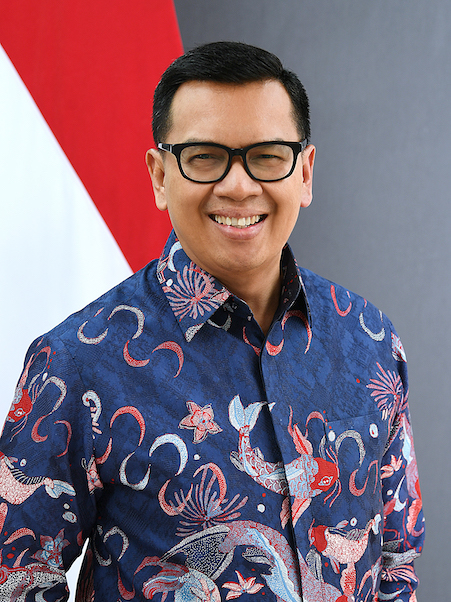

Ambassador of Indonesia to Sweden and Latvia
- Incumbent
- Assumed office 24 March 2025
- President: Prabowo Subianto
- Preceded by: Kamapradipta Isnomo

Chief of the Foreign Policy Strategy Agency
- In office 27 April 2022 – 24 March 2025
- Preceded by: Siswo Pramono; Teuku Faizasyah (acting)
- Succeeded by: Abdul Kadir Jailani (acting); Muhammad Takdir

Chief of the Foreign Ministry Center for Education and Training
- In office 4 April 2018 – 21 November 2022
- Preceded by: Eko Hartono
- Succeeded by: Mohammad Kurniadi Koba

Personal details
- Born: July 20, 1966 (age 59) Tasikmalaya, West Java
- Spouse: Irene Irjayanti
- Children: 1
- Education: Padjadjaran University; Ohio University; Madison University

Yayan Ganda Hayat Mulyana (born 20 July 1966) is an Indonesian diplomat who is currently serving as ambassador to Sweden and Latvia since 2025. Prior to his ambassadorial post, he served as the chief of the foreign ministry center for education and training from 2018 to 2022 and as chief of the foreign policy strategy agency from 2022 to 2025.

== Early life and education ==
Yayan was born in Tasikmalaya, West Java, Indonesia, on 20 July 1966. He received his bachelor's degree in international relations from the Padjadjaran University with a cum laude distinction in 1992. He continued his studies in the United States under the Fulbright scholarship, where he pursued a master's degree in international studies and public administration between 1996 and 1998 at the Ohio University. During his studies at Ohio University, he received the International Affairs Karen D. Jenkins King Award from the university in 1998. He then pursued a doctoral degree in political sciences from 2000 to 2004 at the Madison University.

Outside university education, Yayan also received a diploma equivalent to a master's degree in UN studies from a joint program held by the School of International and Public Affairs and the United Nations Institute for Training and Research Programme of Correspondence Instruction in Peacekeeping Operations in New York and the Peace Operations and Conflict Resolutions Programme of the Institute of World Affairs in Washington, D.C. He also attended the Clingendael advanced diplomatic studies program in Den Haag.

== Career ==
Yayan began his foreign service career in 1993 and attended the junior diplomatic course the next year, in which he received the valedictorian distinction. Upon completing his master's degree, in January 2000 he was assigned to the permanent mission to the United Nations in New York with the rank of second secretary. During this period, he became a research fellow at the Center for Global Change and Governance, Rutgers University from 2003 to 2004.

He returned to Jakarta in January 2004 as the chief of secretariat of the presidential special envoys. A year later, he attended the mid-level diplomatic course, where he received again the valedictorian distinction. He left his presidential posting in 2006 and by 2007 was reassigned to the permanent mission in New York as the political coordinator of the Indonesian team in the security council. He continued his academic work in New York as a research fellow at the Ralph Bunche Institute for International Studies, City University of New York, from 2009 to 2010.

From 2009 to 2010, Yayan was assigned to the embassy in Singapore as the embassy's coordinator for information and socio-cultural affairs with the rank of first secretary. He was designated as the embassy's spokesperson. After his assignment in Singapore, he was assigned as assistant to presidential spokesperson for international relations Teuku Faizasyah. He was involved in Indonesian government works, particularly as an expert for the Indonesian National Committee on the Vision of the Post-2015 Development Agenda between June 2012 and June 2013. In the academia, Yayan became a research fellow at the Centre for Non-Traditional Security Studies at the S. Rajaratnam School for International Studies and a visiting professor at the Padjadjaran University.

After his presidential service, Yayan served as consul general in Sydney from 12 October 2014 to 31 December 2017. In 2015, the consulate general he led was vandalized with paint balloons filled with fake blood and red spray as well as received anonymous threatening letters in response to the execution of two Australian Bali Nine drug trafficker, Andrew Chan and Myuran Sukumaran. Yayan then cooperated with local police, federal authorities, and diplomatic protection units, and requested an investigation on the identity and motive of the perpetrator, though it was never found. Despite the threats during this period, Yayan continued to maintain the consulate general's services including immigration, media, and student support.

As consul general, Yayan continued to push for the improvement of relations between Indonesia and Australia, describing it as a relation between soulmates. He promoted Indonesia through education by collaborating with Australian schools to hold Indonesian language and other Indonesia-related programs. The consulate general also held an "Indonesia Beautiful" fashion show in Sydney in 2017 to strengthen relations in creative industry and fashion between the two countries.

Upon serving in Australia, on 4 April 2018 Yayan was named as the chief of the foreign ministry education and training center. At the end of his term, the COVID-19 pandemic that occurred pushed the center to continue develop its existing learning management system (LMS). Yayan planned the LMS as the core of the center's existence as a corporate university for the foreign ministry.

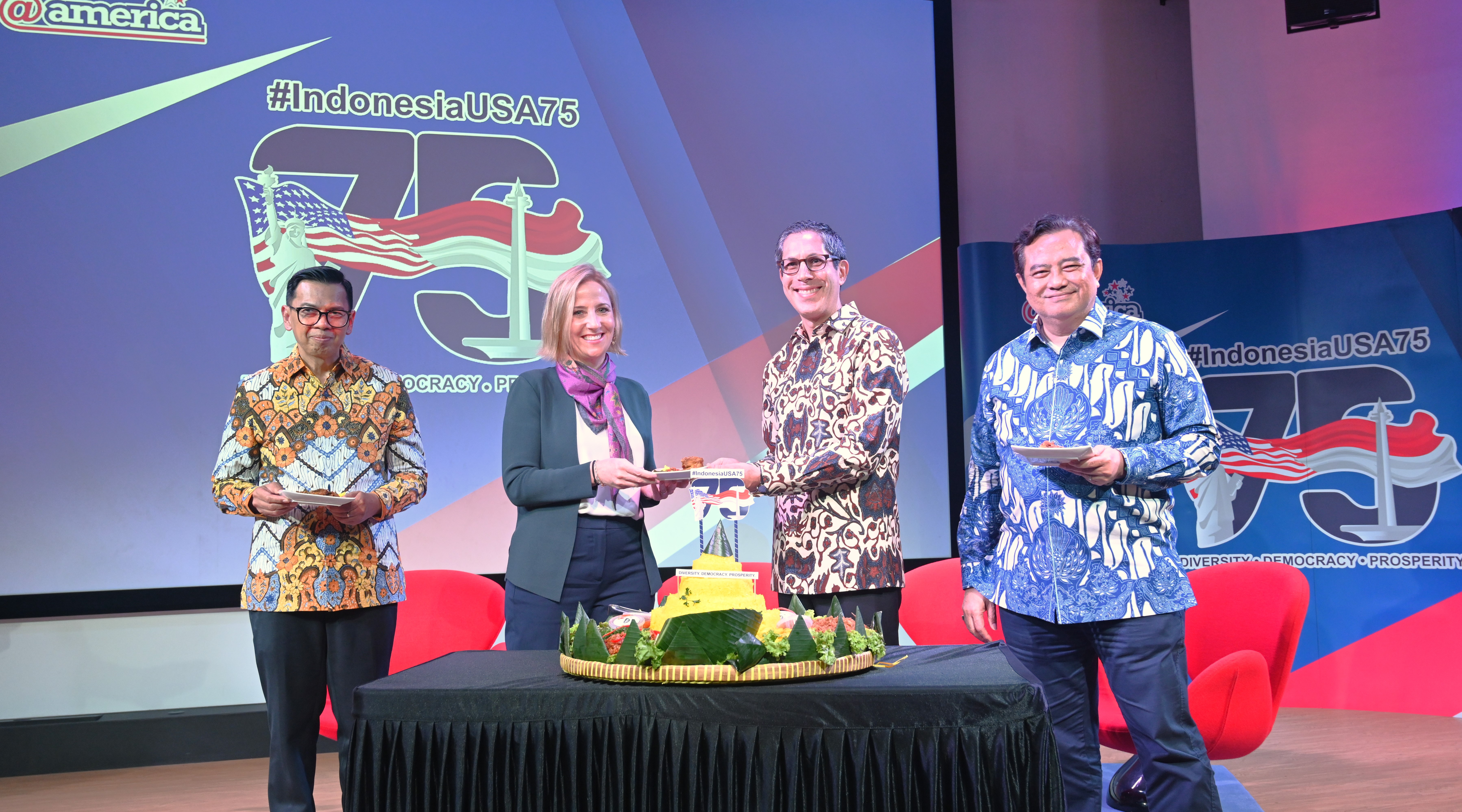
Yayan (far left) with the United States Deputy Assistant Secretary for Maritime and Mainland Southeast Asia Melissa A. Brown in 2024.

After leading the center for around four years, on 27 April 2022 Yayan was named as the chief of the foreign policy strategy agency, which was the foreign ministry's research and development department. In August 2024, President Joko Widodo nominated Yayan as Indonesia's ambassador to Sweden, with concurrent accreditation to Latvia. He passed an assessment held by the House of Representative's first commission in September that year. and was installed by President Prabowo Subianto on 24 March 2025. He presented his credentials to King of Sweden Carl XVI Gustaf on 11 September 2025 and president of Latvia Edgars Rinkēvičs on 18 December 2025.

== Personal life ==
Yayan Ganda Hayat Mulyana is married to Irene Irjayanti and has one son.
