= Mohammad Kurniadi Koba =

Indonesian diplomat

Mohammad Koba
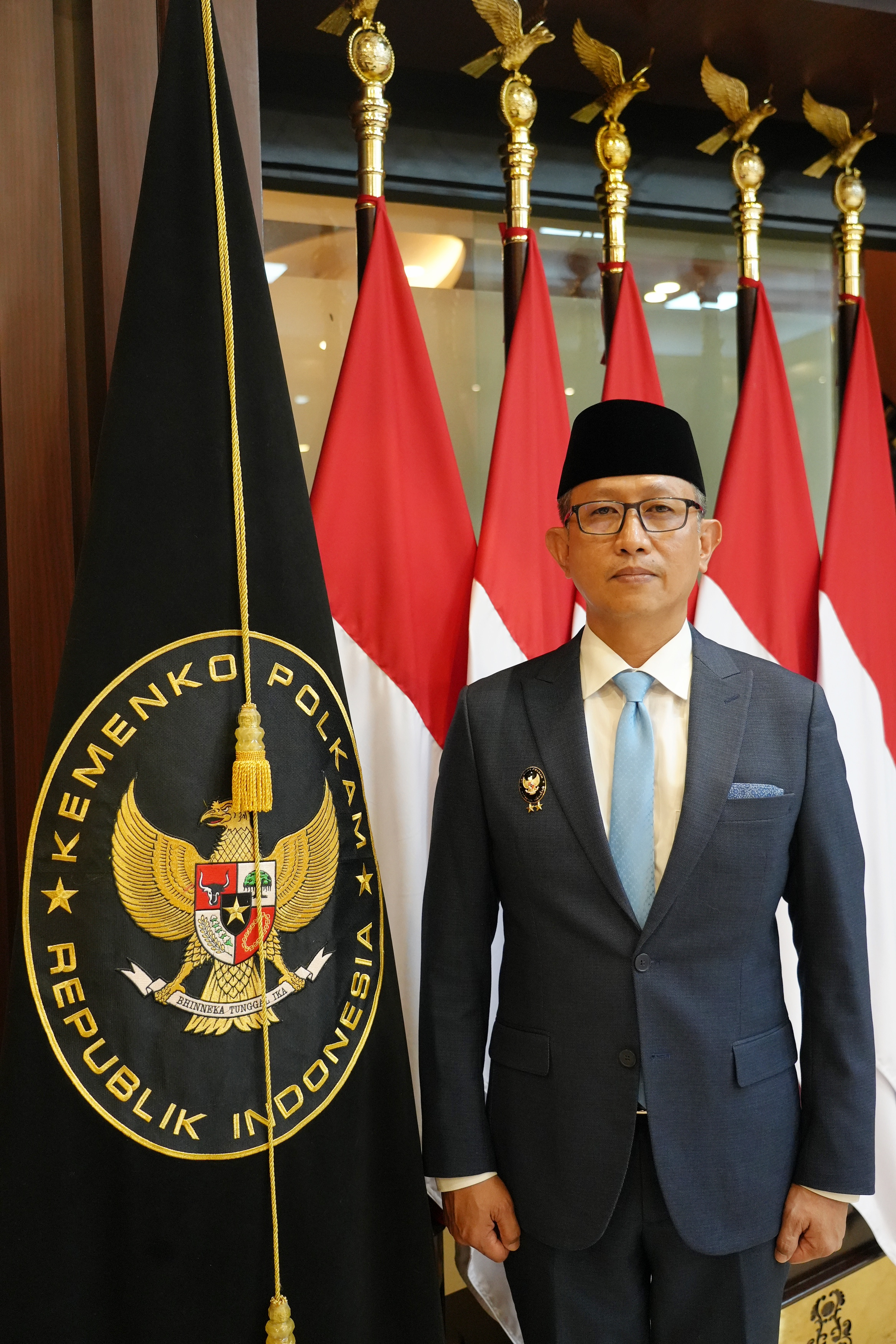

Deputy for Foreign Policy Coordination of the Coordinating Ministry of Politics and Security
- Incumbent
- Assumed office 26 March 2025
- Preceded by: Rina Soemarno

Director of the Indonesia Diplomatic Academy
- In office 21 November 2022 – 13 April 2025
- Preceded by: Yayan Ganda Hayat Mulyana
- Succeeded by: Bonifacius Riwi Wijayanto (acting); Khasan Ashari

Personal details
- Education: Airlangga University; Vrije Universiteit Brussel

Mohammad Koba is an Indonesian diplomat who is currently serving as the Deputy for Foreign Policy Coordination in the Coordinating Ministry of Political and Security Affairs of the Republic of Indonesia since March 2025. Prior to his assignment in the Coordinating Ministry, Koba served as the Director of the Indonesia Diplomatic Academy from 2022 to 2025 and Ambassador/Deputy Permanent Representative of Indonesia to the United Nations in New York, from 2019 to 2022.

== Early life and education ==
Koba received his bachelor's degree in International Relations from the Airlangga University in 1995 and master's degree in European Integration and Development from the Vrije Universiteit Brussel in 2002.

== Career ==
Koba served in various postings abroad, including at the Indonesian Permanent Mission to the United Nations in Geneva (2008 to 2012). He was in charge of matters relating to CITES, UNFCCC, POPs Convention, PIC, and RAMSAR. Koba represented Indonesia in the 10th Conference of Parties of the Basel Convention, which saw the adoption of an amendment to the convention that enhances the effectiveness of banning export of hazardous wastes from developed nations to developing countries.

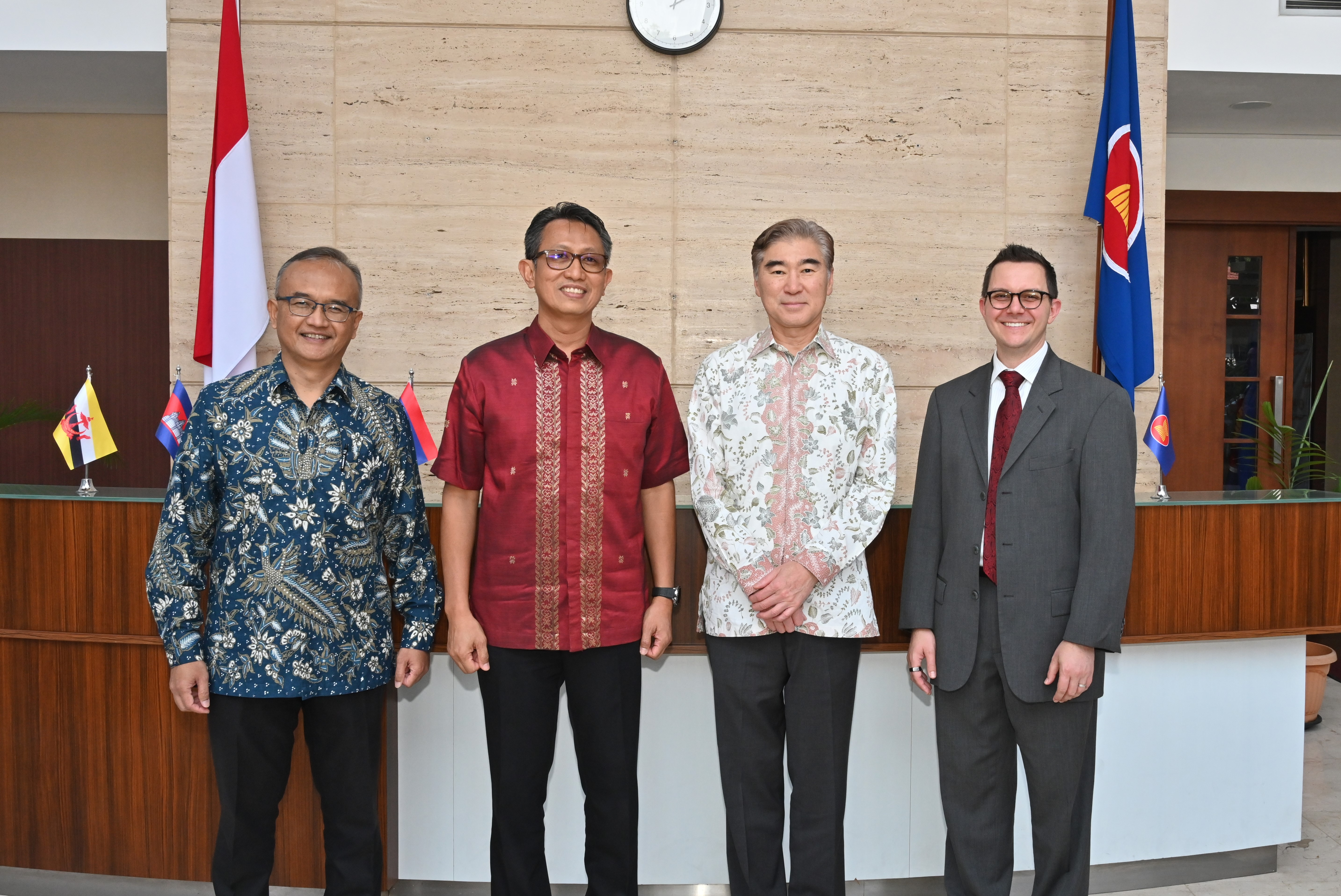
Koba (second from left) receiving ambassador of the United States to Indonesia Sung Y. Kim, 2023.

Upon his return to Indonesia in April 2012, Koba was assigned as the Deputy Director in the General Affairs Bureau. Koba was appointed as the head of the bureau on 26 April 2017. He served in this position until 2019, when he took up office as Indonesia's Ambassador/Deputy Permanent Representative to the United Nations in New York. He returned upon his appointment as the Director of the Indonesia Diplomatic Academy of the Foreign Ministry. On 24 March 2025, he was installed as the Deputy for Foreign Policy Coordination in the Coordinating Ministry of Political and Security Affairs Republic of Indonesia. He handed over his office in the foreign ministry on 13 April 2025.
