= Hamid Alhadad =

Indonesian diplomat

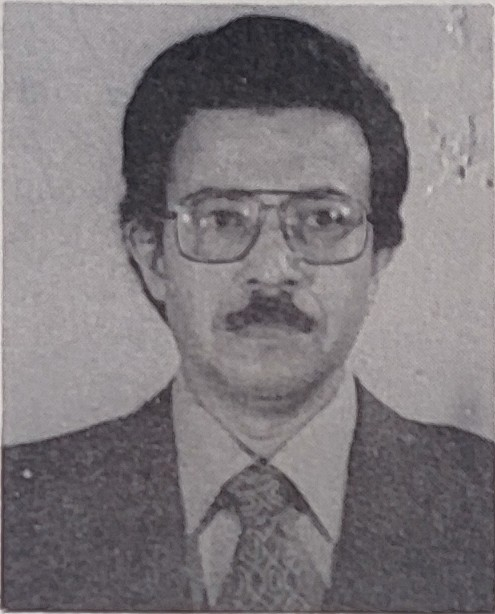
- Hamid Alhadad

Ambassador of Indonesia to Algeria, Guinea, and Mali
- In office 1991–1994
- Preceded by: Singgih Hadipranowo
- Succeeded by: Lillahi Grahana Sidharta

Personal details
- Born: July 7, 1935 (age 91) Bangil, East Java, Dutch East Indies
- Spouse: Anisah Muhammad (m. 1967)
- Children: 3
- Relatives: Abdul Kadir Jailani (son-in-law)
- Education: Foreign Service Academy; University of Virginia (M.A.)

Hamid Alhadad (born 7 July 1935) is an Indonesian career diplomat who served as the country's ambassador to Algeria, with concurrent accreditations to Guinea and Mali from 1991 to 1994. His prior postings included a stint as the head of the foreign department's library and documentation center and deputy chief of mission at the embassy in The Hague, Netherlands.

== Early life, education, and family ==
Hamid was born in Bangil, East Java, on 7 July 1935, as the youngest of eight of Ja'far Alhadad, an ulema and the chief mufti of the Assegaff Mosque and Bangli's grand mosque, and Zainab. His grandfather from his father's side, Muhammad Alhadad, was a sayyid from Tarim, Hadhramaut who migrated to the-then Dutch East Indies and married a Javanese nability, whom Hamid nicknamed as Bu De. His grandmother from his mother's side, who goes by the name of Tuk Ayu, came from Palembang.

As a child during the Dutch East Indies era, Hamid recalled being trained by Dutch troops to hide below their beds as part of an exercise in the event of a bombing raid by Japanese troops. Hamid was educated at a madrasa in Bangil until the age of 7, when his family moved to Surakarta. Hamid continued his education at the Ar-Rabithah Al-Alawiyah madrasa, where he studied for six years. Hamid and his family lived at his older brother-in-law's house in the Gemblengan street for a while, before moving to his parents' house at Kawatan Sraten street. At the start of the Japanese occupation of the Dutch East Indies, Hamid witnessed the Japanese troops, who landed in Rembang and faced little-to-no resistance from the Dutch army, marching into Surakarta with hundreds of armored cards and jeeps.

Due to lack of planning regarding the curriculum, Ar-Rabithah Al-Alawiyah was reorganized from a madrasa to the more secular Sekolah Rakyat (elementary school, literally People's School), and the school's fifth to seventh grade programs were closed. Hamid, who at the time of the closure was already at the sixth grade, decided to leave the school and took a placement test in to be admitted to the Mangkunegaran middle school. Hamid later credited his madrasa background for his proficiency in the Arabic language and his knowledge on religious affairs, which allowed for a closer engagement with stakeholders during his posting in Middle East countries such as Lebanon and Algeria.

During the early days of the Indonesian National Revolution, Hamid remained in Surakarta to continue his studies. At the onset Operation Kraai in late 1948, which targeted Indonesian-controlled areas including Surakarta, Hamid and his family faced financial difficulties amidst frequent blackouts and returned to Bangil. Due to the absence of secondary education in Bangil and its vicinity, Hamid moved to Malang to pursue further education, where she lived with her mother's relative. Hamid studied at the Oro-Oro Dowo Catholic Middle School (now Mardi Wiyata). As Hamid had already completed seventh grade at the Mangkunegaran middle school, he was immediately assigned to the second grade in the school. Upon completing middle school, Hamid continued his education to the state high school at Alun-Alun Bunder.

Hamid graduated from the Foreign Service Academy in 1957 after studying for three years. During his diplomatic service, he received a Fulbright scholarship to pursue Master of Arts degree from the University of Virginia, which he completed in 1963 after studying for two years. He later completed senior diplomatic education (Sekolah Staf dan Pimpinan Luar Negeri, Sesparlu).

Hamid is married to Anisah Muhammad in February 1967. The couple has three daughters. His second daughter, Rahmayanti Hamid, is married to Abdul Kadir Jailani, Indonesia's current ambassador to Germany.

== Diplomatic career ==
Hamid began his career in Indonesia's foreign ministry upon his graduation from the academy in 1957. After acquiring his master's degree, he worked in journalism as the managing editor for the Jakarta publication from 1963, before returning to diplomacy in 1967. He was posted at the embassy in Bonn, the de facto capital of West Germany, as the embassy's head of information with the diplomatic rank of third secretary. Two years later, in 1969, he was sent to the embassy in Washington, D.C. for the same posting, with a promotion to the diplomatic rank of second secretary.

Hamid returned to the foreign ministry's central office in 1971, being appointed to a mid-level position within the directorate of foreign information. He was then sent to the embassy in Beirut as chargé d'affaires with the rank of first secretary for a few months, before being transferred to the embassy in Prague with a promotion to the diplomatic rank of counsellor. He served for five years until 1979, and after a domestic stint at Indonesia's ASEAN National Secretariat in Jakarta until 1981, was sent abroad to the embassy in The Hague as its political chief with the diplomatic rank of minister counsellor.

Hamid was appointed as the head of the foreign department's library and documentation center, a second-level echelon position under the foreign department's research and development agency, in 1986. He was posted to The Hague for a second time in 1989 as the embassy's deputy chief of mission, or commonly referred to as the deputy ambassador. Two years later, on 4 January 1991 he was installed as ambassador to Algeria, with concurrent accreditation to Guinea and Mali, resident in Algiers. His ambassadorial term ended in 1994. Upon retiring from the foreign department, Hamid authored four editions of memoirs, where he retold stories of his childhood and diplomatic experience through first-person perspective and poems.
