= Muhammad Takdir =

Indonesian diplomat (born 1968)

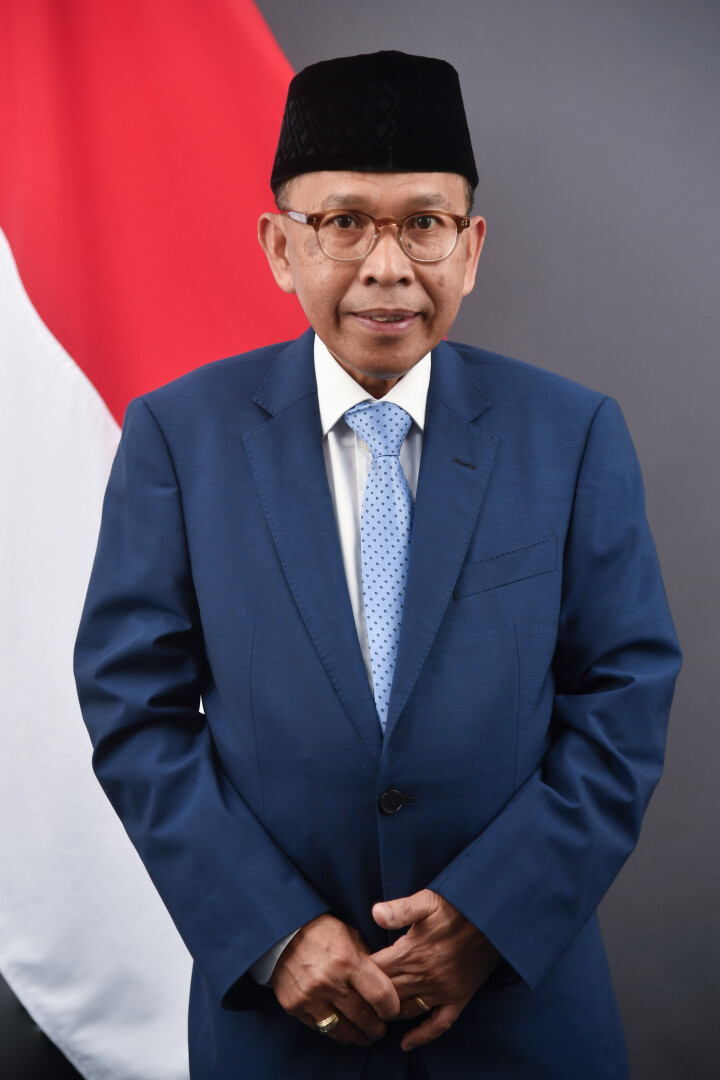

Chief of the Foreign Policy Strategy Agency
- Incumbent
- Assumed office 17 September 2025
- Preceded by: Yayan Ganda Hayat Mulyana; Abdul Kadir Jailani (acting)

Personal details
- Born: 27 January 1968 (age 58)
- Education: Hasanuddin University (S.H.)

Muhammad Takdir (born 27 January 1968) is an Indonesian diplomat who is currently serving as chief of the foreign policy strategy agency since 2025. He previously served as the chief of the foreign ministry's Asia-Pacific regional policy strategy agency and deputy chief of mission at the embassy in Brussels

== Early life and education ==
Born on 27 January 1968, Takdir was a 1986 alumni of the IMMIM Putra pesantren in Makassar. He studied international law at the Hasanuddin University. He also completed further education at the Geneva Centre for Security Policy.

== Career ==
Takdir joined the foreign ministry in March 1996. In 1999, he became part of the United Nations' observer team for East Timor and, from 1999 until 2000, was part of a negotiating team from Indonesia on the opening of the Bank of China. During the tenure of ambassador to Canada Eki Syachrudin, he was assigned to the economic section of the embassy in Ottawa with the rank of third secretary.

Around the mid-2007, Takdir was posted to the economic section of the embassy in Vienna with the rank of second secretary. During his posting in Vienna, from 2007 to 2008 Takdir was part of OPEC's legal team. On 16 September 2008, Darianto was installed as a member of the overseas election committee for the 2009 Indonesian elections in Vienna. By 2009, he was promoted to the rank of first secretary. He returned to an overseas assignment in 2014 at the economic section of the permanent mission in Geneva with the rank of counsellor. By 2016, Takdir had already reached the diplomatic rank of minister-counsellor. In 2019, he applied for an assistant deputy position at the coordinating ministry for economic affairs, but was not accepted.

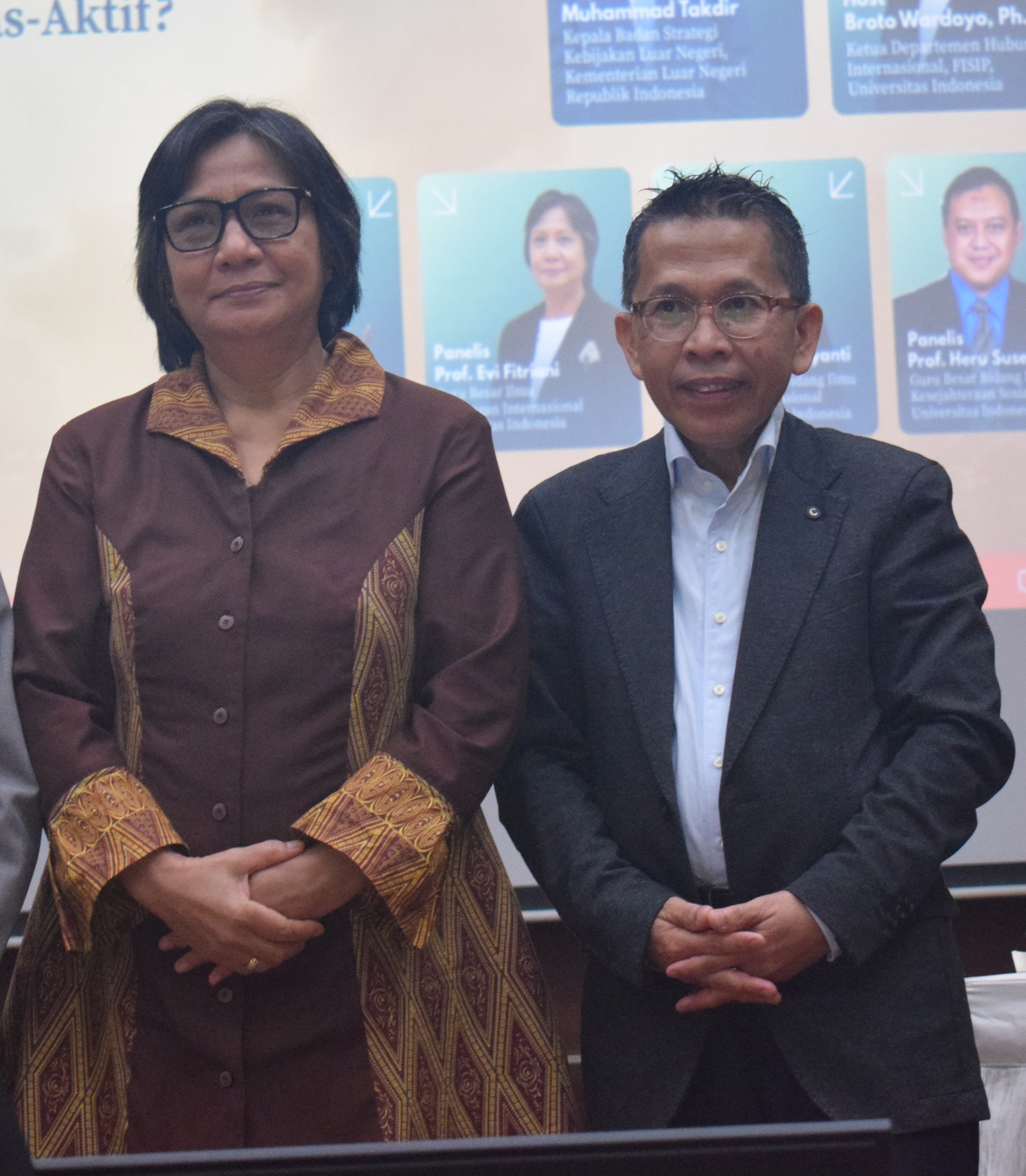
Takdir (left) with University of Indonesia dean of socio-political sciences Evi Fitriani, 2026.

From 2020 to September 2023, Takdir served as the chief of the foreign ministry's Asia-Pacific regional policy strategy agency. On 8 August 2023, he became the deputy chief of mission at the embassy in Brussels. He began his duties as deputy chief of mission on 1 October that year. During his posting, Takdir requested the European Union to further delay the implementation of the EU Regulation on Deforestation-free products, stating that it is "unworkable" for Indonesia.

On 17 September 2025, Takdir became the chief of the foreign policy strategy agency.
