= Kenssy Dwi Ekaningsih =

Indonesian diplomat (born 1959)

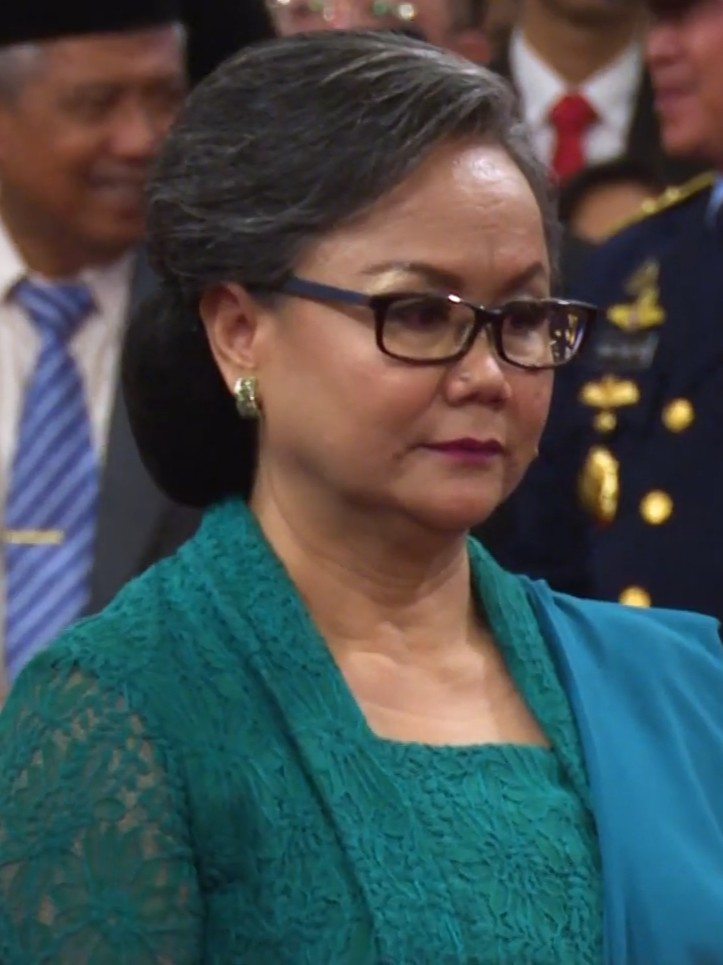
- Ekaningsih in 2019

Ambassador of Indonesia to the Czech Republic
- In office 13 February 2019 – 28 February 2025
- President: Joko Widodo; Prabowo Subianto
- Preceded by: Aulia Aman Rachman
- Succeeded by: Rina Soemarno

Personal details
- Born: 17 August 1959 (age 67) Yogyakarta, Indonesia
- Children: 2
- Parent: K. P. H. Notoprojo (father)
- Education: Gadjah Mada University (Dra.)

Kenssy Dwi Ekaningsih (born 17 August 1959) is an Indonesian retired diplomat who last served as ambassador to the Czech Republic from 2019 to 2025. Before her ambassadorial tenure, she served as consul general in Shanghai from 2013 to 2016 and secretary of the protocol and consular directorate general from 2016 to 2019.

== Early life and education ==
Born in Yogyakarta on 17 August 1959, Kenssy was born into a family of artists. Her father, K. P. H. Notoprojo, was a prominent gamelan master who taught gamelan in California, and had one of his compositions, the Puspawarna, included on the Voyager Golden Record. Kenssy spent her childhood in Yogyakarta and continued her higher education in the same city, where she studied international relations at the Gadjah Mada University (UGM) in 1978. In contrast to most of her peers who were involved in political activities, Kenssy joined Swagayugama, UGM's Javanese dance student association, and learned traditional dance at the Paguyuban Beksan Ngayogyakarto. She graduated with a bachelor's degree in February 1983. Upon graduating, Kenssy initially considered working in journalism, but she ended up choosing diplomacy.

== Diplomatic career ==
Kenssy joined the foreign ministry after completing basic diplomatic education in 1986. The year after, she was assigned as section chief within the directorate general of politics. Her first overseas assignment was at the consular section of the embassy in Rome with the rank of third secretary. Kenssy began engaging in cultural diplomacy during her assignment in Rome, where she would perform traditional Javanese dance in diplomatic receptions. Her favorite Javanese dance was the Golek Lambangsari, which she described as a calm and dynamic dance.

After being posted in Rome, Kenssy returned to the foreign ministry as the chief of Southeast Asia Section in the directorate of Asia Pacific within the directorate general of Politics from 1994 to 2001. After completing her mid-level diplomatic training in 2001, she was posted to the consulate general in Johor Baru as consul for press, social, and cultural affairs with the rank of first secretary, serving until 2002. She was responsible for managing the presence Indonesian migrant workers and citizens, which was unexpected for her. On one occasion, Kenssy had to coordinated with local authorities to manage the casualties and contact the families of the victims of a capsized ship carrying Indonesian citizens from Batam.

Kenssy was appointed as the deputy director (chief of subdirectorate) of the first region within the South America and Caribbean directorate in 2002. A year later, she completed her senior diplomatic education. After a two-year stint, she was sent to the economic section of the embassy in Bangkok, serving with the diplomatic rank of minister counsellor. Returning to Jakarta in 2007, she became secretary to the directorate general of Asia, Pacific, and Africa. Her career continued with a posting as deputy chief of mission at the embassy in Singapore in 2011. Following the appointment of Indonesia's ambassador to Singapore Wardana as deputy foreign minister, Kenssy became the embassy chargé d'affaires ad interim, during which she organized Enchanting Indonesia, a two-day cultural heritage promotion of Indonesia. The event was attended by, among others, the-then future President of Singapore Halimah Yacob.

After serving in Singapore, Kenssy was appointed as consul general in Shanghai in 2013. During her tenure, she focused on promoting trade, investment, and tourism to Indonesia. She invited governors and mayors from Indonesia to visit Shanghai for comparative study and establish sister city cooperation. After three years of serving in Shanghai, on 21 November 2016 Kenssy was appointed as the secretary of the protocol and consular directorate general. Following reorganizations within the foreign ministry, she was reappointed to the position on 3 January 2017.

=== Ambassador to the Czech Republic ===
Kenssy being sworn in as ambassador in 2019.

In September 2018, President Joko Widodo nominated Kenssy for ambassador to the Czech Republic. After passing an assessment held by the House of Representative's first commission on 3 October, she was installed as ambassador on 13 February 2019. She presented her credentials to the President of the Czech Republic Miloš Zeman on 19 June 2019.

As ambassador, she stated her focus were on promoting trade, investment, and tourism to address the trade deficit with the Czech Republic, and continuing the priority of protecting Indonesian citizens. During the COVID-19 pandemic, her team at the Indonesian Embassy in Prague, predominantly consisting of women, worked quickly to establish a Contingency Plan, optimize a hotline, disseminate information, provide logistical aid to 217 vulnerable Indonesian citizens, facilitate the repatriation of 15 Indonesian migrant workers, and negotiate with employers to ensure Indonesian migrant workers received their due wages in line with the Czech economic stimulus package. Kenssy also continued promoting Indonesia through cultural diplomacy with her dance skills and, in the Indonesia's 78th Independence Day celebration, performed the Srikandi-Suradewati classical Yogyanese dance.

Kenssy also supported the exiles of the 30 September Movement—Indonesian citizens who were stranded abroad due to the political upheaval—who resided in Prague. Kenssy facilitated communication between the exiles and the Indonesian government. She also organized meetings between the exiles and the National Commission on Human Rights and with Indonesia's coordinating minister for politics, law, and security Mahfud MD and justice and human rights minister Yasonna Laoly, advocating for the restoration of their constitutional rights and recognition of their unjust treatment. In a meeting with the latter, Kenssy broke into tears after describing the exiles who sang the Indonesia's national anthem with fervent patriotism. Her efforts culminated in the government recognizing the constitutional rights of the exiles and providing them with special immigration services for their return to Indonesia.

Kenssy ended her ambassadorial term with a handover ceremony to the chargé d'affaires ad interim Ely Tioria on 28 February 2025.

== Personal life ==
Kenssy is married with two children. She is a fan of Stevie Wonder.
