= Sudirman Haseng =

Indonesian diplomat (born 1961)

Ambassador of Indonesia to Cambodia
- In office 20 February 2018 – 30 January 2023
- President: Joko Widodo
- Preceded by: Pitono Purnomo
- Succeeded by: Santo Darmosumarto

Ambassador of Indonesia to Nigeria
- In office 10 August 2010 – January 2015
- President: Susilo Bambang Yudhoyono; Joko Widodo
- Preceded by: Nurhadi Djazuli
- Succeeded by: Harry Purwanto

Personal details
- Born: December 29, 1961 (age 64) Sidrap, South Sulawesi, Indonesia
- Spouse: Dian Nurindah Prahasty Djamain
- Children: 4
- Education: Hasanuddin University (S.E.); University of Indonesia (M.Si.)
- Occupation: Diplomat

Sudirman Haseng (born 29 December 1961) is an Indonesian diplomat who served as ambassador to Nigeria from 2010 to 2014 and to Cambodia from 2018 to 2023. A graduate of the Hasanuddin University, Sudirman had been posted to diplomatic missions in Tokyo, Kuwait, and Penang. His last position in the foreign ministry was as the secretary of the Asia, Pacific, and Africa directorate general.

== Early life and education ==
Born in Sidenreng Rappang Regency of South Sulawesi on 29 December 1961, Sudirman began studying economics and regional studies at the Hasanuddin University in 1981. He earned his bachelor's degree in 1985. He later obtained a master’s degree in Japanese area studies from the University of Indonesia in 1997. He is married to Dian Nurindah Prahasty Djamain and has four children.

== Diplomatic career ==
Haseng joined the foreign ministry in 1982. His first overseas posting was at the embassy in Tokyo, where he became the head of the sub-section for financial cooperation from 1990 to 1994. Haseng worked closely with the Tokyo International Conference for African Development during his four years in the country. Upon returning to Jakarta, he became the head of the section for financial cooperation for the Americas and Asia Pacific II within the foreign ministry between 1996 and 1997. His international assignments continued as the head of the economic department at the consulate general of Indonesia in Penang from 1997 to 2001, followed by a role as the deputy director for the second region within the directorate of intra-regional cooperation for the Americas and Europe from 2002 to 2003.

Between 2003 and 2006, he served as the chief for economic, protocol, and consular functions at the embassy of Indonesia in Kuwait with the diplomatic rank of counselor. In December 2004, Sudirman and his wife survived a shooting incident in Rumaithiya where a drug addict fired at their car. Sudirman later assumed leadership of the embassy as chargé d'affaires ad interim at the end of his term in 2006, during which he received a visit by president Susilo Bambang Yudhoyono, who inspected Indonesia migrant workers in the country.

From Kuwait, Sudirman was appointed as the director of Africa within the foreign ministry, serving from 2006 to 2010. During this period, Sudirman explored possibilities of cooperation in satellite technology with African countries. He also oversaw the designation of 25 African countries as priority countries for bilateral relations development and the establishment of a joint commission with Namibia. At the end of his term, Sudirman announced that Indonesia's trade with Africa had grown by five percent per year over the past five years, reaching an annual trade volume of more than two billion dollars. Sudirman was then named as the acting director for East Asia and Pacific for a few months in 2010, in which he played a role in directing adjustments to bilateral relations with Japan following the resignation of prime minister Yukio Hatoyama.

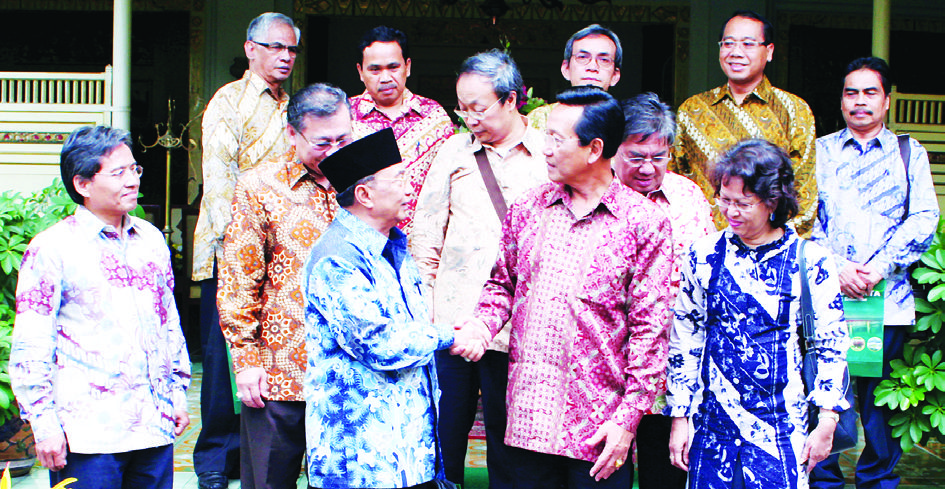
Sudirman (third row, second from left) with other ambassador candidates during a reception by the Governor of Yogyakarta Hamengkubuwono X, 2009.

Sudirman was nominated by president Susilo Bambang Yudhoyono as ambassador to Nigeria, with concurrent accreditation to Benin, Togo, Ghana, Cameroon, Liberia, Republic of the Congo, Burkina Faso, and Cape Verde in August 2009. After successfully passing an assessment by the House of Representative's first commission, Sudirman was sworn in on 10 August 2010. He presented his credentials to president Ellen Johnson Sirleaf of Liberia on 4 March 2011, foreign minister Henri Eyebe Ayissi on 29 March 2011, president Blaise Compaoré of Burkina Faso on 15 July 2011, and president Jorge Carlos Fonseca of Cape Verde on 5 December 2012.

At the start of his term, Sudirman described Indonesia's relations with Nigeria as "solid". Sudirman followed up an MoU establishing joint commission on bilateral cooperation signed in 2010 with a bilateral cooperation agreement signed in April 2012 and the first joint commission meeting in 2013. Governmental cooperation also included an MoU on small and medium enterprises development on the same year. To increase trade cooperation between the two countries, Sudirman organized visits by Indonesian businesspersons to Nigeria, including from Indonesia's trade minister. Vice versa, Sudirman facilitated exhibitions by Nigerian companies in Indonesia in 2012. Sudirman encouraged Nigeria to adopt inter-religious dialogue policies between religion and community leaders and for the government to promote harmony through inter-tribal marriages. On 16 December 2013, Sudirman was awarded the title of Sarkin Yakin (war commander) by the chairman of the Shere tribal community, Alhaji Ibrahim Jera, for his role in developing the rural community's elementary school. At the end of his term, in January 2015 Sudirman was summoned by Nigeria's foreign ministry regarding the execution of Nigerian citizens for drug-related charges. The Nigerian government disputed the death toll reported by Indonesia, stating that two Nigerians were executed rather than one.

After completing his mission in Africa, in 2014 he returned to the ministry to serve as the secretary of the directorate general of Asia Pacific and Africa. In his capacity, Sudirman led an economic mission to North Korea in May 2015 following a decrease in trade volume. In October 2017 Djauhari was nominated by President Joko Widodo as ambassador to Cambodia. After passing an assessment by the House of Representative's first commission on 24 October 2017, Sudirman was sworn in for the second time as ambassador on 20 February 2018. He presented his credentials to King Norodom Sihamoni on 25 May 2018.

In this role, Sudirman focused on translating the historical and political closeness of the two nations into concrete economic benefits, specifically targeting increased investment, the sale of strategic industrial products, and the establishment of direct flight connectivity. He also championed cultural diplomacy through the "sister temple" cooperation between Angkor Wat and Borobudur and worked to increase the number of Cambodian students studying in Indonesia through various scholarship programs. Sudirman's tenure as ambassador ended on 30 January 2023.
