= Bambang Suharto =

Indonesian diplomat (born 1966)

Ambassador of Indonesia to Nigeria
- Incumbent
- Assumed office 24 March 2025
- Preceded by: Usra Hendra Harahap

Personal details
- Born: 12 April 1966 (age 60)
- Education: Airlangga University; Middlebury Institute of International Studies at Monterey

Bambang Suharto (born 12 April 1966) is an Indonesian diplomat who is currently serving as ambassador to Nigeria, Benin, Burkina Faso, Ghana, Liberia, Niger, Sao Tome and Principe, Togo, and the ECOWAS since 24 March 2025.

== Career ==
After receiving his bachelor's degree, Bambang briefly worked at the Niaga Bank's export import division, before joining the foreign ministry in March 1991. He served as first secretary at the embassy in Helsinki in 2005. From 2012 to 2016, he was the coordinator for economic affairs in the Embassy of Indonesia, Tokyo, with the diplomatic rank of minister counsellor. During his tenure, Indonesia's ambassador to Japan Yusron Ihza Mahendra requested a visa-free access for Indonesian citizens traveling to Japan.

Bambang had a brief stint as the chief of the subdirectorate for forum and institutional cooperation within the Directorate for ASEAN Political Security Cooperation. He was involved in organizing the ASEAN Regional Forum and ASEAN Inter-Parliamentary Assembly. On 3 January 2017, Bambang was installed as Inspector IV in the foreign ministry's inspectorate general after passing a selection process. He was responsible for internal audits and performance evaluations for diplomatic missions in America and Pacific as well as the directorate general of information and public diplomacy, directorate general of protocol and consular affairs, education and training center, and communication center. In early 2020, Bambang was appointed as consul general in Penang. He arrived on 2 March 2020 and handed his credentials to Governor of Penang Abdul Rahman Abbas eleven days letter. During his tenure, the consulate general introduced an online-based consular queue system called Sinako to improve public service delivery.

In August 2024, President Joko Widodo nominated Bambang as Indonesia's ambassador to Nigeria, with concurrent accreditation to Benin, Burkina Faso, Ghana, Liberia, Niger, Sao Tome and Principe, Togo, and the ECOWAS. He passed a fit and proper test held by the House of Representative's first commission in September that year. He was installed by President Prabowo Subianto on 24 March 2025. He presented his credentials to president Bola Tinubu of Nigeria on 4 December 2025, president Abdourahamane Tiani of Niger on 15 January 2026, president Carlos Vila Nova of São Tomé and Príncipe on 10 February 2026, president Joseph Boakai of Liberia on 18 February 2026, President of the ECOWAS Commission Omar Touray on 4 June 2026, president John Mahama of Ghana on 15 June 2026, and president Ibrahim Traoré of Burkina Faso on 26 June 2026.
