= Wiwiek Setyawati =

Indonesian diplomat (born 1957)

Wiwiek Setyawati Firman
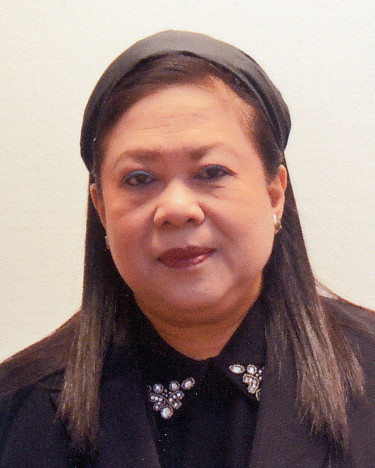

Ambassador of Indonesia to Finland and Estonia
- In office 13 January 2016 – July 2020
- President: Joko Widodo
- Preceded by: Elias Ginting
- Succeeded by: Ratu Silvy Gayatri

Personal details
- Born: 4 June 1957 (age 69) Jakarta, Indonesia
- Spouse: Kemas Firman
- Children: 2
- Education: University of Indonesia (S.H.)
- Profession: Diplomat

Wiwiek Setyawati Firman (born 4 June 1957) is an Indonesian career diplomat who served as ambassador to Finland and Estonia from 2016 to 2020. Prior to her ambassadorial posting, she served as director of human rights and humanitiarian affairs from 2005 to 2009 and advisor to the minister of foreign affairs for political, legal, and security affairs from 2013 to 2016.

== Early life and education ==
Born in Jakarta on 4 June 1957, Setyawati studied law at the University of Indonesia, earning her bachelor's degree in 1982.

== Diplomatic career ==
Upon graduating from university, Wiwiek joined the foreign service and completed her basic diplomatic education in 1985. From 1986, she served within the directorate of international organizations, serving as the acting chief of socio-economic section from 1986 to 1988. She was then posted to the consulate general in Sydney until 1992. She returned to Indonesia with a permanent appointment as the chief of socio-economic section, serving until 2000. During her time as section chief, she attended multiple United Nations General Assembly from the 49th in 1994 to 56th Sessions in 2001, the UN Commission on the Status of Women (1996–2000), and the International Labour Conference (1994–1999). She also participated in the Fourth World Conference on Women in Beijing in 1995 and represented the government in dialogues with the UN Committee on the Rights of the Child in Geneva in 1993 and 1994.

She was promoted to serve as the chief of administration within the foreign department's directorate of international organisations from 2000 to 2000, before being posted at the embassy in Singapore as chief of political affairs until 2004. She undertook mid-level diplomatic course on the same year after completing her stint in Singapore. On 28 December 2005, Wiwiek became the foreign department's director of human rights and humanitiarian affairs. During her tenure, Wiwiek voiced Indonesia's support for the adoption of the Convention on the Protection of All Persons from Enforced Disappearance at the UN Human Rights Council plenary session held on 27 June 2007.

Upon serving as director, by June 2009 Wiwiek became the deputy chief of mission at the embassy in Canberra. In 2011, she collaborated with her husband in resolving a human trafficking case involving the arrest of dozens of Indonesian ship crews and fishermen. Utilizing expertise in bone structure analysis, Wiwiek's husband helped her in determining whether a victim was either an adult or a trafficking victim. The embassy eventually managed to freed the prisoners. At the end of her term, in the mid-2012's Wiwiek became the embassy's chargé d'affaires ad interim. Wiwiek was then recalled to Jakarta to serve as the foreign minister's advisor (special staff) for political, legal, and security affairs. In 2014, Wiwiek became the acting director general of international law and treaties, during which she signed an agreement regarding the overlapping Exclusive Economic Zones in the Mindanao Sea and Celebes Sea with the Philippines. Following the Malaysia Airlines Flight 370 disappearance, Wiwiek was dispatched as the government's special envoy for the incident.

On 6 August 2015, President Joko Widodo nominated Wiwiek as ambassador to Finland, with concurrent accreditation to Estonia, to the House of Representatives. Upon being assessed by the House of Representative's first commission on 16 September 2015, she was installed on 13 January 2016. She presented her credentials to the President of Finland Sauli Niinistö on 17 March 2016 and to the President of Estonia Toomas Hendrik Ilves on 26 April 2016. During her tenure, Wiwiek focused on promoting Indonesian premium coffee and tourism to environmentally conscious Finnish travelers. She also initiated the first interfaith and intermedia dialogue between Indonesia and the Nordic region in 2018.

Aside from promoting Indonesia, Wiwiek also worked to provide consular and protection services to Indonesian citizens in Finland. On one occasion, Wiwiek had to travel to the city of Oulu, which was 600 kilometres (370 mi) away from the embassy, to introduce Finland's dual nationality and citizenship laws to Indonesians living there. Wiwiek also became notable for her efforts in facilitating young athlete Lalu Muhammad Zohri, who won the gold medal in the men's 100 meters at the 2018 IAAF World U20 Championships in Tampere. Zohri remarked in a meeting with President Joko Widodo that Wiwiek gave him an “extraordinary” attention and he was warmly welcomed “like a king”. Wiwiek's ambassadorial tenure ended in July 2020

== Personal life ==
Setyawati is married to Kemas Firman, a physician specializing in pediatric radiology, and the couple has two children. Due to the demands of their respective careers, as of 2018, Setyawati resided alone in Helsinki while her husband was engaged in his profession, with the family meeting every three months.
