= Santo Darmosumarto =

Indonesian diplomat (born 1975)

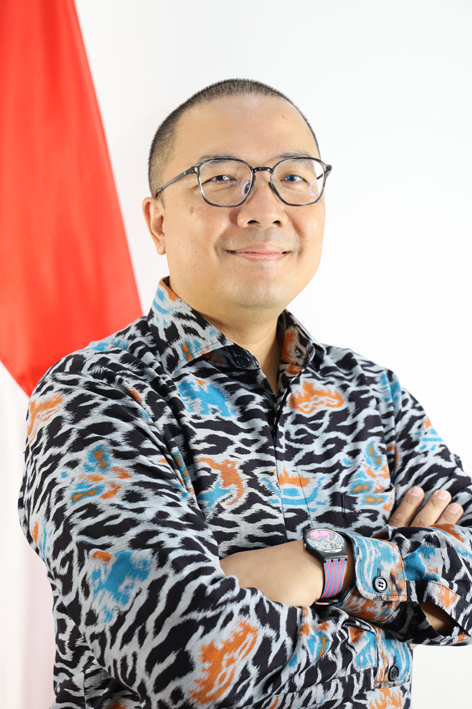

Director General of Asia, Pacific, and Africa
- Incumbent
- Assumed office 18 December 2025
- Preceded by: Abdul Kadir Jailani; Zelda Wulan Kartika (acting)

Ambassador of Indonesia to Cambodia
- In office 26 June 2023 – 26 February 2026
- Preceded by: Sudirman Haseng
- Succeeded by: Krishnajie Partadireja (acting)

Personal details
- Born: 30 January 1975 (age 51) Jakarta, Indonesia
- Spouse: Nansy Sentana
- Education: University of British Columbia; University of Victoria; Monash University

Santo Darmosumarto (born 30 January 1975) is an Indonesian diplomat who is currently the Director General of Asia, Pacific, and Africa of the Indonesian Ministry of Foreign Affairs. He was previously Ambassador of Indonesia to Cambodia and Director for East Asia at the Ministry of Foreign Affairs.

== Early life ==
Santo was born in Jakarta on 30 January 1975. Upon completing high school at the Sir Winston Churchill High School, Santo pursued his bachelor's degree in international relations at the University of British Columbia, graduating in 1997. He then continued his education at the University of Victoria, receiving his master of arts in political sciences in 1999. From 2001, he pursued his doctorate in international relations at the Monash University School of Political and Social Inquiry, which he completed in 2004. His thesis, titled Chinese Foreign Policy towards Southeast Asia in the post-Tiananmen Period, 1989-1995, was advised by Dennis Woodward. During his doctorate studies, Santo became a teaching assistant for courses on international relations and Australian foreign policy.

== Career ==
Santo joined the Indonesian Foreign Ministry in 2000. Upon receiving his doctorate, Santo served at the Political Section of the Embassy of Indonesia in Beijing from 2005 to 2009 with the rank of Third Secretary and later Second Secretary. He returned for his second stint at the Embassy of Indonesia in Beijing as Coordinator for Socio-cultural affairs with the rank of Counsellor from 2014 to 2018. During his posting in China, Santo was directly involved in Belt and Road Initiative cooperation, and published a number of Chinese-related articles. Santo viewed Indonesia’s engagement with China’s BRI as a strategic and pragmatic move and supported the notion of Indonesia employing a hedging strategy to balance between cooperation and caution.

Between his two postings in China, Santo served as Assistant to the Presidential Spokesperson (Special Staff) for International Affairs, Teuku Faizasyah. During his tenure, Santo criticized the lack of attention given by the general populace to Indonesia’s foreign policy under President Susilo Bambang Yudhoyono. He also became an Associate Researcher at the Center for Southeast Asian Studies (CSEAS) and The Habibie Center, as well as an Adjunct Professor at Sampoerna School of Business and Paramadina University Graduate School of Diplomacy.

After serving in China, Santo was assigned at the Office of the Chief of Staff of the Foreign Minister at the Ministry of Foreign Affairs, serving as Chief of Media Relations and Spokesperson Division. In his capacity, Santo was responsible for preparing and coordinating materials, and providing both substantive and technical support to the Foreign Minister, Deputy Minister, and the Chief of Staff (who also acted as the ministry's spokesperson). Upon serving there, on 22 April 2019 Santo assumed duties as Director for East Asia and Pacific. In 2021, the Pacific section of the directorate was established as its own directorate in line with the government's Pacific Elevation policy, thus renaming Santo's position as Director of East Asia.

== Ambassador to Cambodia ==
In December 2022, Santo was nominated as Ambassador to Cambodia by President Joko Widodo. After passing an assessment by the House of Representative's First Commission the next month, he officially assumed office on 26 June 2023. Santo presented his credentials to King Norodom Sihamoni on 18 October 2023. He conducted his first courtesy call to Prime Minister Hun Manet on 10 January 2024, highlighting the need for the two countries to further build a mutually beneficial cooperation.

On 10 October 2024, Santo was awarded the Prima Duta Award by President Joko Widodo for the Embassy's achievement in boosting trade cooperation between Indonesia and Cambodia.

On 29 August 2024, Santo and Royal Cambodian Army Chief General Mao Sophoan presided over the delivery of military assistance from Indonesia to Cambodia amounting to USD 500.000. The assistance consisted of 150 pieces of SS2-V5 A1 assault rifles, 20 pieces of G2 Elite pistols, 500,000 rounds of 5.56 x 45 mm bullets, and 500,000 rounds of 9 x 19mm bullets. The weapons and munitions were produced by Indonesian state-owned weapons manufacturer PT Pindad.

One of the embassy's major work was addressing the significant and growing issue of Indonesian citizens involved in online gambling and scam operations in Cambodia. According to Santo, many Indonesian citizens in Cambodia do not have legal work permits, nor do they report to the Embassy, suggesting that many are in the country illegally or involved in unregulated work. Under Santo, the Embassy was involved in handling thousands of cases relating to online scams. He described the handling of the cases as "the most complicated, dangerous, and time-consuming task". The Embassy also collaborated with the Cambodian authority on rescuing and repatriating Indonesian citizens caught in scam operations as well as sharing best practices.

On 18 December 2025, Santo was sworn in as Director General of Asia, Pacific, and Africa at the Indonesian Ministry of Foreign Affairs. Santo departed Phnom Penh on 26 February 2026. A month prior to his departure, he was awarded the Grand Cross of the Royal Order of Sahametrei by Senate President Hun Sen for his role in strengthening bilateral relations. Santo's maiden assignment as Director General was leading Indonesia's delegation to the APEC Senior Officials' Meeting in Guangzhou, China, from 9 to 10 February 2026.
