= Rina Soemarno =

Indonesian career diplomat (born 1964)

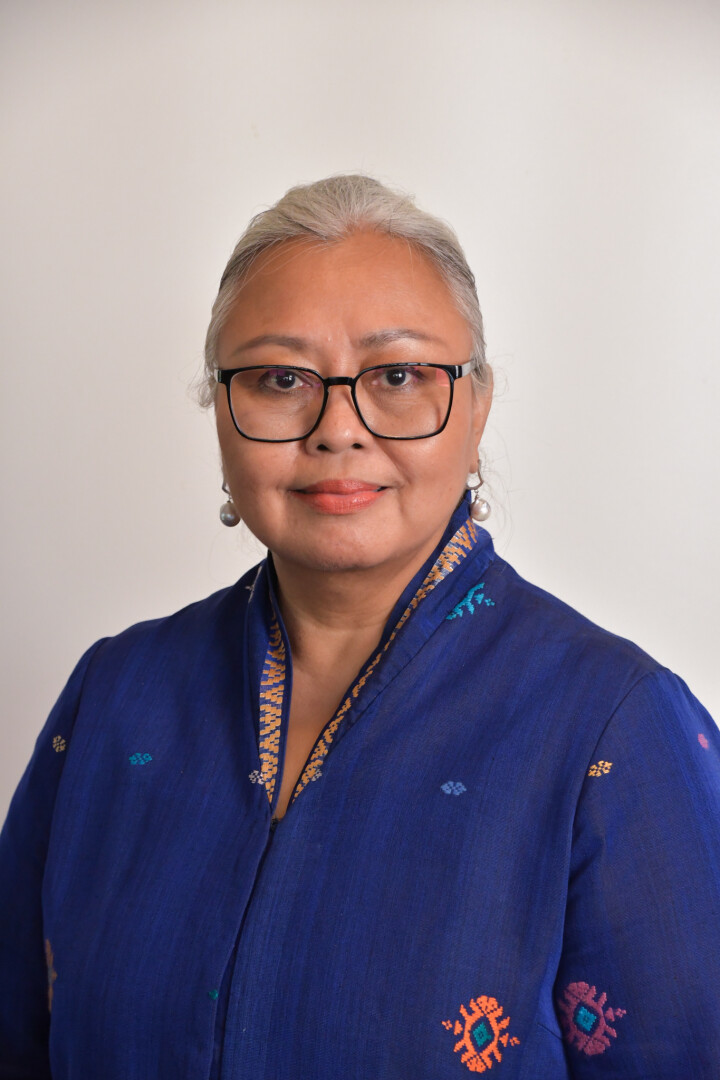

Ambassador of Indonesia to the Czech Republic
- Incumbent
- Assumed office 24 March 2025
- President: Prabowo Subianto
- Preceded by: Kenssy Dwi Ekaningsih

Deputy for Foreign Policy Coordination
- In office 21 September 2021 – 31 October 2024
- Preceded by: Lutfi Rauf
- Succeeded by: Mohammad Kurniadi Koba

Ambassador of Indonesia to Bangladesh
- In office 18 May 2017 – 29 August 2021
- President: Joko Widodo
- Preceded by: Iwan Wiranataatmadja
- Succeeded by: Heru Hartanto Subolo

Personal details
- Born: October 9, 1964 (age 61) Jakarta, Indonesia
- Spouse: Budhi Yuwono
- Education: University of Indonesia; University of Stirling

Rina Prihtyasmiarsi Soemarno (born 9 October 1964) is an Indonesian career diplomat who is currently serving as ambassador to the Czech Republic since 2025. She previously served as ambassador to Bangladesh and deputy for foreign policy coordination.

== Early life and education ==
Rina was born in Jakarta on 9 October 1964. She studied psychology University of Indonesia and received her bachelor's degree in 1989. She then continued her graduate studies at the University of Stirling in Scotland, United Kingdom, where she earned her master's degree in public relations in 1994.

== Diplomatic career ==
Rina Soemarno joined the foreign department in 1990. Upon completing junior diplomatic education and her master's education, from 1996 to 1999 she was assigned at the information and socio-cultural affairs section at the embassy in London with the rank of third secretary. She was promoted to second secretary during her tenure in the embassy.

Upon her return to Indonesia in 2000, she became the chief of media section within the foreign department's directorate of information and media. She attended the mid-level diplomatic course in 2001, and by 2002 was posted to the political section within the embassy in Brussels. She was then transferred on 1 January 2006 to the economic section with the promoted rank of counselor. Returning to Jakarta, she was assigned as the chief of international organizations within the directorate general of multilateral cooperation's secretariat. Around this period, she attended the senior diplomatic course in 2007. From 2009 to 2012, Rina was posted at the permanent representative for the United Nations in Geneva as minister-counsellor for economic affairs.

On 12 April 2012, Rina officially assumed duties as the secretary of the directorate general of multilateral affairs. In November 2016, Rina was nominated by President Joko Widodo for ambassador to Bangladesh and was assessed by the House of Representative's first commission the next month. She continued to held her secretariat position, and, following reorganizations within the foreign ministry, was re-installed on 3 January 2017. She was installed as ambassador on 18 May 2017. She arrived in Bangladesh on 1 June, received her duties from chargé d'affaires ad interim Inggrid Rosalina on 4 June, and presented her credentials to President of Bangladesh Mohammad Abdul Hamid on 18 July 2017.

During her tenure, the embassy facilitated President Joko Widodo's visit to Camp Jamtoli in Cox’s Bazar, which made him the first head of state to visit a Rohingya refugee camp, and the first state visit by an Indonesian president in over fifteen years. Since the start of herm term, she advocated for the provisioning of visa on arrival to Indonesian passport holders as a reciprocity for Bangladeshi citizen's visa-free entry to Indonesia. The visa on arrival for Indonesian citizens was finally realized in May 2021, but was suspended due to the COVID-19 pandemic in the country at that time. In 2019, the embassy re-opened its defence attache office following its closure in 1998 due to the financial crisis at that time. During the COVID-19 pandemic, several planned Indonesian promotion fairs were cancelled and Indonesian gatherings were restricted. The embassy monitored and coordinated assistance for consular and health matters to Indonesian living in Bangladesh and Nepal. She officially left her post on 29 August 2021, with the handover of duties to chargé d'affaires ad interim Hidayat Atjeh. On 21 September 2021, Rina assumed duties as the deputy for foreign policy coordination under coordinating minister for political, security, and legal affairs Mahfud MD.

In August 2024, President Joko Widodo nominated Rina as Indonesia's ambassador to the Czech Republic. She passed a fit and proper test held by the House of Representative's first commission in September that year. and was installed by President Prabowo Subianto on 24 March 2025. She presented her credentials to the President of the Czech Republic Petr Pavel on 1 July 2025.

== Personal life ==
Rina is married to Budhi Yuwono.
