= Usra Hendra Harahap =

Indonesian diplomat and former Air Force flag officer

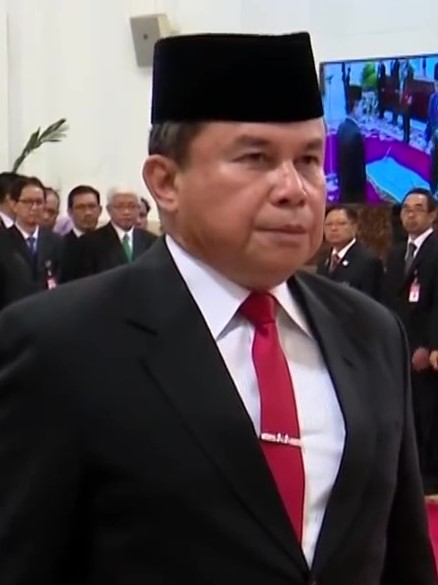

Indonesia Ambassador to Nigeria
- In office 21 March 2019 – 24 March 2025
- President: Joko Widodo
- Preceded by: Harry Purwanto
- Succeeded by: Bambang Suharto

Personal details
- Born: 11 August 1959 (age 66) Padang, West Sumatra
- Party: Golkar

Military service
- Allegiance: Indonesia
- Branch/service: Air Force
- Years of service: 1982–2017
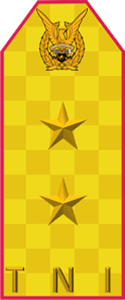
- Rank: Air Vice Marshal
- Usra Hendra Harahap's voice Recorded March 2019 by the Presidential Secretariat

Usra Hendra Harahap (born 11 August 1959), also known as Ucok, is an Indonesian diplomat and former Air Force flag officer who has served as the ambassador of Indonesia to Nigeria since 21 March 2019.

== Early life and military career ==
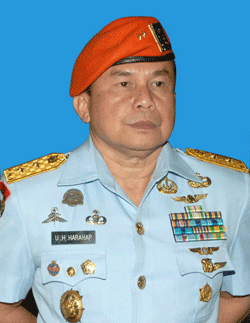
Usra Hendra Harahap as the coordinator of expert staffs to the Air Force Chief of Staff.

Usra was born on 11 August 1959 in Padang, West Sumatra. He began his military service after graduating from the Indonesian Air Force Academy in 1982. Usra holds a Master of Science degree and a doctoral degree in political science upon graduation from the University of Merdeka in 2002 and 2005, respectively.

Usra became a flag officer following his promotion to air first marshal on 4 June 2010. At the time of his promotion, he was appointed as the deputy superintendent of School of Defense and Strategic Studies. After serving in the position for two years, Usra was promoted from deputy superintendent to superintendent of the school on 1 February 2012. His rank was promoted accordingly a month later.

Several months after his promotion to superintendent, Usra was moved to the Indonesian Defense University, where he became the dean of the university's defence strategy faculty. After holding this academic office for a while, Usra was made as deputy rector of the university a day before the end of 2013. Twenty eight days later he was moved to the air force headquarters to serve as a special staff to the air force chief of staff.

A year later, 19 January 2015, Usra was appointed to coordinate all of the air force's central expert staff, and was installed for the office eight days later. During his tenure as coordinator, Usra publicly criticized the Indonesian Aerospace company, stating that the company failed to put the Indonesian air force as its primary customer and blamed the air force's lack of preparedness to the company.

Usra's position as coordinator became his last position in the military, as in 2017, he was relieved from his office and retired from the military shortly afterwards.

== Indonesian Ambassador to Nigeria ==
Usra joined the political party Golkar following his retirement from the military. In September 2018, Golkar chairman Airlangga Hartarto announced that the president had named Usra as a candidate to be the Indonesian ambassador to Nigeria. After passing a test held by the People's Representative Council, he was installed as an ambassador on 21 November 2019. He is concurrently accredited as an ambassador to Nigeria, Benin, Burkina Faso, Ghana, Liberia, Niger, São Tomé and Príncipe, Togo, and the Economic Community of West African States.

On 3 May 2020, three Indonesian crew members of a fishing vessel were taken hostage by pirates off the coast of Santa Clara, Gabon. Usra conducted communications with the Indonesian embassy in Paris, the Indonesian honorary consulate in Gabon, and the South Korean embassies in Abuja and Libreville in preparation for a rescue operation. He then personally led the operation to free the hostages. The hostages were released on 8 June and were picked up by Usra two days later.
