= Genting =

Genting may refer to:

- Genting, Sarawak, an inhabited place near Kelupu and Labas
- Genting Group, a Malaysian conglomerate
- Genting Highlands, a mountain resort in Malaysia
  - Genting Grand Hotel
  - Genting Sempah, the mountain on which Resorts World Genting (formerly Genting Highlands Resort) is situated
- Genting Sempah–Genting Highlands Highway, a federal highway in Malaysia
- Genting Skyway, a gondola lift in Malaysia
- Genting Snow Park, Hebei, China, the venue for the freestyle skiing and snowboarding events at the 2022 Winter Olympics
