= Elias Ginting =

Indonesian diplomat (born 1956)

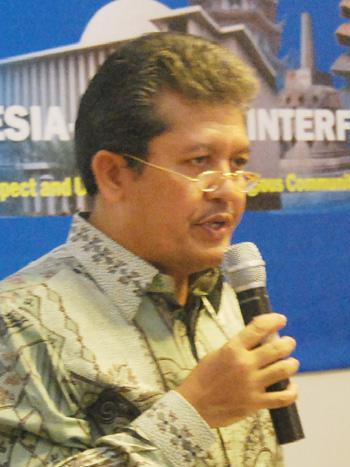

Ambassador of Indonesia to Finland and Estonia
- In office 21 December 2011 – 29 January 2016
- President: Susilo Bambang Yudhoyono; Joko Widodo
- Preceded by: Harry Purwanto
- Succeeded by: Wiwiek Setyawati

Personal details
- Born: October 9, 1956 (age 69) Kabanjahe, North Sumatra, Indonesia
- Spouse: Agnes Bangun
- Children: 2
- Education: Gadjah Mada University (Drs.)
- Occupation: Diplomat

Elias Ginting (born 9 October 1956) is an Indonesian diplomat who served as ambassador to Finland and Estonia from 2011 to 2016. A career diplomat, Elias had previously served in various positions within the foreign ministry, including as deputy director for Asia-Pacific technical cooperation and secretary of the information and public diplomacy directorate general.

== Early life and education ==
Born on 9 October 1956 in Kabanjahe, the capital of the Karo Regency of North Sumatra, Elias graduated from a seminary and initially wanted to become a pastor. He later chose to study international relations at the Gadjah Mada University due to his consideration of the major's exceptionality. Despite never aspiring to become a diplomat, he applied for the occupation upon being informed about the foreign ministry's recruitment program.

== Diplomatic career ==
Elias successfully applied for the foreign ministry in 1983 and was recruited as a civil servant candidate. Upon completing basic diplomatic education in 1984, he began working as a staff at the Africa and Middle East directorate, where he handled political affairs. He briefly served as the acting chief of the East and South African section in the directorate before receiving his maiden overseas posting at the embassy in Brussels. From 1985 to 1990, Elias handled protocol and consular affairs within the embassy.

Returning to Indonesia in 1990, Elias was assigned to Indonesia's ASEAN secretariat as the chief of youth and women cooperation section. He completed his mid-level diplomatic education during this period in 1992. Upon serving for four years, Elias was stationed at the embassy in Singapore as the chief of economic subsection. After four years, Elias returned to Jakarta and completed his senior diplomatic education in 1998. A year later, in 1999 he became the deputy director for America, Asia Pacific, and Africa and Middle East Affairs within the technical cooperation directorate. In 2001, he underwent another overseas assignment, serving in the same position as before at the embassy in The Hague, Netherlands.

By the time he returned to the foreign ministry in 2005, Elias was placed as a non-managerial staff at the directorate for commodity and standardization. The next year, he returned to the technical cooperation directorate as the deputy director for the Asia Pacific region. Two years later, on 3 November 2008 Elias became the secretary of the information and public diplomacy directorate general.

In mid-2011, Elias was nominated by president Susilo Bambang Yudhoyono as ambassador to Finland with concurrent accreditation to Estonia. Elias passed his assessment by the House of Representative's first commission on 24 August 2011. After he was sworn in on 21 December 2011, he received his duties from charge d'affaires ad interim Siti Azzah Murad on 6 February 2012 and presented his credentials to president Sauli Niinistö of Finland on 22 March 2012 and to president Toomas Hendrik Ilves of Estonia on 24 April 2012. His term ended on 29 January 2016 and was replaced by charge d'affaires ad interim Andalusi Aristaputri.

Upon retiring from the diplomatic service, Elias became the general manager of Risun Indonesia, the subsidiary of the China-based coke producing China Risun company and also became a senior advisor to the parent company. Following the establishment of the Association of Indonesia Coke Industry in May 2025, Elias became the association's chair.

== Personal life ==
Elias is married to Agnes Bangun and has two daughters. Elias adheres to the Roman Catholic faith and is a community leader in his parish. Elias loves to paint as a way to express his feelings and always tries to spend as much time possible with his family.
