= Juan Carlos Salazar Gómez =

Colombian public servant

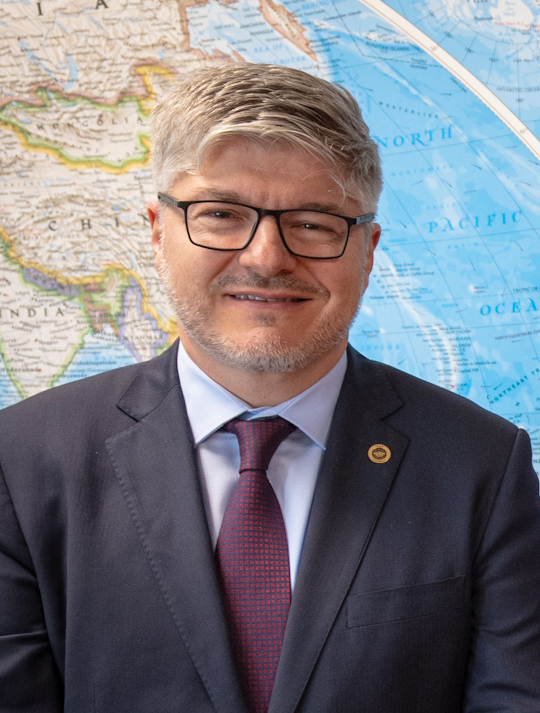
- Salazar Gómez in 2022
- Born: Medellín, Colombia
- Education: Harvard University; McGill University; Pontifical Bolivarian University; (Master of Public Administration; Master's degree in Air and Space Law; Bachelor of Laws)
- Employer: ICAO
- Known for: Secretary-General of the ICAO

Juan Carlos Salazar Gómez is the Secretary-General of the International Civil Aviation Organization (ICAO). Since May 2018, he has served as director of the Colombian Civil Aviation Authority, a presidentially-appointed position. On 11 March 2024, the ICAO Council renewed his appointment for a second consecutive three-year term starting August 2024.
