= Foreign relations of Indonesia =

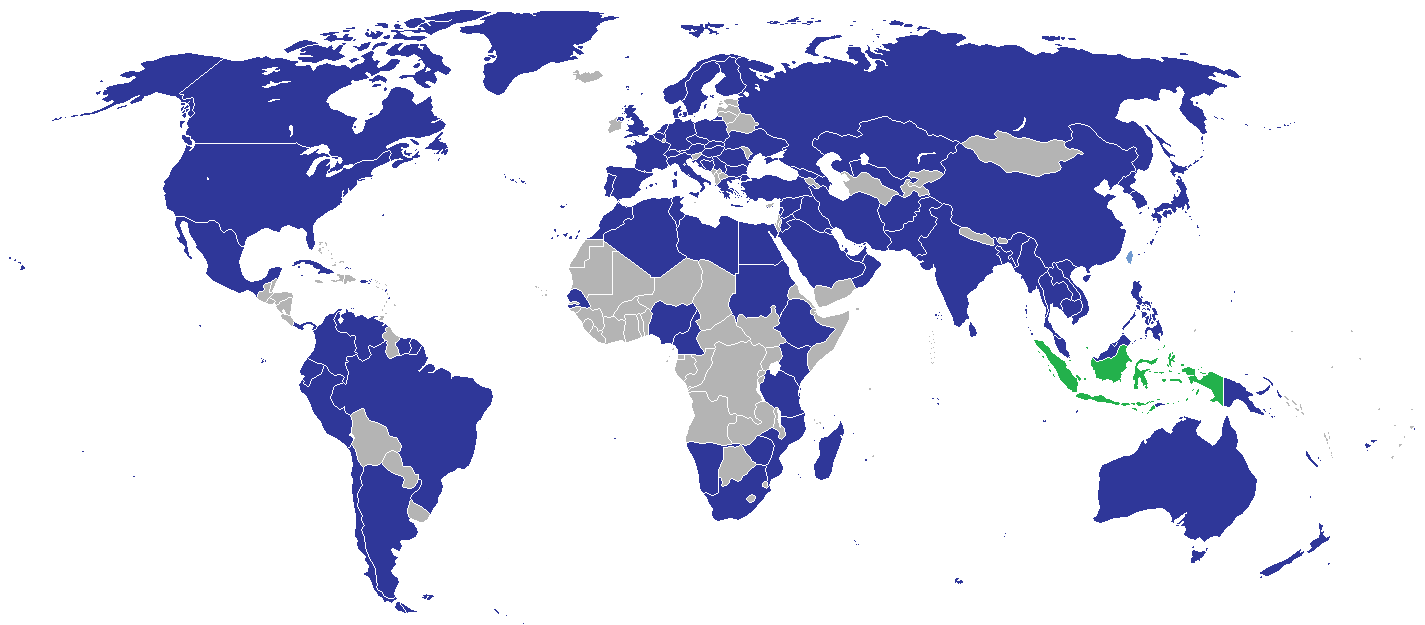
Map of countries with diplomatic missions of Indonesia shown in blue.

Since independence, Indonesian foreign relations have adhered to a "free and active" foreign policy, seeking to play a role in regional affairs commensurate with its size and location but avoiding involvement in conflicts among major powers. During the presidency of Sukarno, Indonesia's foreign relations were marked by engagement with other newly independent nations in Asia and Africa, as exemplified by the Bandung Conference, the subsequent foundation of the Non-Aligned Movement and a confrontational attitude towards Western powers, justified by a belief in the CONEFO and opposition to what Sukarno termed as NEKOLIM (Neocolonialism and Imperialism).

After a US-backed ouster of Sukarno and left-wing elements in 1965, Indonesian foreign policy underwent a major shift under the "New Order" government, as President Suharto moved away from the stridently anti-Western, anti-American posturing that characterised the latter part of the Sukarno era. Following Suharto's ouster in 1998, Indonesia's government has preserved the broad outlines of Suharto's independent, moderate foreign policy. Preoccupation with domestic problems has not prevented successive presidents from travelling abroad.

Indonesia's relations with the international community were strained as a result of its invasion of neighbouring East Timor in December 1975, the subsequent annexation and occupation, the independence referendum in 1999, and the resulting violence afterwards. As one of the founding members of Association of Southeast Asian Nations (ASEAN), established in 1967, and also as the largest country in Southeast Asia, Indonesia has put ASEAN as the cornerstone of its foreign policy and outlook. After the transformation from Suharto's regime to a relatively open and democratic country in the 21st century, Indonesia today exercises its influence to promote co-operation, development, democracy, security, peace and stability in the region through its leadership in ASEAN. Currently, Israel is the only UN member state that does not have formal diplomatic relations with Indonesia, although they maintain informal relations.

Indonesia managed to play a role as a peacemaker in the 2008–2013 Cambodian–Thai border crisis. Indonesia and other ASEAN member countries collectively have also played a role in encouraging the government of Myanmar to open up its political system and introduce other reforms more quickly.

Given its geographic and demographic size, rising capabilities and diplomatic initiatives, scholars have classified Indonesia as one of Asia-Pacific's middle powers.

== Historical issues ==
The foreign policy of Indonesia has evolved over time and has been shaped by various factors such as its historical context, geographic location, national interests, and leadership. Here is an overview of the historical context of Indonesia's foreign policy:

- Founding Principles: Indonesia's foreign policy is rooted in the country's founding principles of Pancasila, which emphasizes peaceful coexistence, mutual respect, and non-interference in the domestic affairs of other countries.
- Western New Guinea. The western part of New Guinea was under Dutch colonial rule and known as "West Irian." When Indonesia gained independence from the Netherlands in 1945, the Dutch retained control over West Irian, but Indonesia claimed it. The United Nations supervised the transfer of West Irian to Indonesia in 1963. The region officially became a part of Indonesia in 1969 through a UN-sanctioned referendum known as the Act of Free Choice.
- Non-Aligned Movement: After gaining independence from Dutch colonial rule in 1945, Indonesia played a prominent role in the Non-Aligned Movement (NAM). The NAM was a group of countries that chose not to align with any major power bloc during the Cold War, advocating for a neutral stance and promoting cooperation among developing nations.
- Regional Leadership: Indonesia has sought to establish itself as a leader in the Southeast Asian region. It was one of the founding members of the ASEAN (Association of Southeast Asian Nations) in 1967 and has been actively involved in regional initiatives to promote peace, stability, and economic integration in Southeast Asia.
- "Free and Active" Foreign Policy: In the 1950s and 1960s, under the leadership of President Sukarno, Indonesia pursued a "free and active" foreign policy. This policy aimed at asserting Indonesia's independence and taking an active role in global affairs by participating in international organizations, supporting decolonization movements, and advocating for the rights of developing nations.
- Post-Suharto Era: Following the resignation of President Suharto in 1998, Indonesia underwent political and economic reforms. This period saw a shift in foreign policy priorities, focusing more on economic development, regional cooperation, and democracy promotion. Indonesia also embraced a more pragmatic approach in its foreign relations.
- Timor-Leste: In 1975, shortly after East Timor declared independence from Portuguese colonial rule, Indonesia invaded and occupied the territory. The occupation lasted for 24 years and was marked by widespread human rights abuses, violence, and resistance from the East Timorese people. The international community largely condemned the occupation. Various human rights organizations and activists put pressure on Indonesia to leave. In 1999, Indonesia agreed to hold a UN-sponsored referendum to determine its political status. The majority of the East Timorese people voted for independence, leading to widespread violence and destruction orchestrated by pro-Indonesia militias. International peacekeeping forces, led by Australia, restored order. Timor-Leste finally achieved independence in 2002.
- Territorial Integrity: Indonesia places great importance on its territorial integrity and has been firm in its stance against any threats to its sovereignty. It has been involved in various territorial disputes, including those in the South China Sea, and has sought to resolve them through peaceful means, including diplomatic negotiations.
- Counterterrorism and Maritime Security: Indonesia has actively cooperated with regional and international partners in combating terrorism and ensuring maritime security. It has been affected by terrorist attacks in the past and has taken steps to enhance intelligence-sharing, border control, and counterterrorism efforts.
- Economic Diplomacy: With the world's fourth-largest population and a growing economy, Indonesia has focused on economic diplomacy to attract foreign investment, promote trade relations, and strengthen economic ties with other countries. It has pursued partnerships with both developed and developing nations to foster economic growth and development.
- Climate Change and Environmental Issues: As a country highly vulnerable to the impacts of climate change, Indonesia has been actively engaged in international efforts to address environmental issues. It has been a vocal advocate for sustainable development, forest conservation, and reducing greenhouse gas emissions.
- Global and Regional Multilateralism: Indonesia actively participates in various multilateral organizations, including the United Nations (UN), the World Trade Organization (WTO), and the Asia-Pacific Economic Cooperation (APEC). It has sought to contribute to global peace, security, and development by engaging in multilateral dialogues and fostering regional cooperation.

== Significant international memberships ==
=== Association of Southeast Asian Nations (ASEAN) ===
The Secretariat of ASEAN in Jakarta

A cornerstone of Indonesia's contemporary foreign policy is its participation in the Association of Southeast Asian Nations (ASEAN), of which it was a founding member in 1967 with Thailand, Malaysia, Singapore, and the Philippines. Since then, Brunei, Vietnam, Laos, Myanmar, and Cambodia also have joined ASEAN. While organised to promote shared economic, social, and cultural goals, ASEAN acquired a security dimension after Vietnam's liberation of Cambodia in 1979; this aspect of ASEAN expanded with the establishment of the ASEAN Regional Forum in 1994, which comprises 22 countries, including the US.

The Indonesian capital Jakarta is also the seat of ASEAN Secretariat. Other than serving their diplomatic missions for Indonesia, a number of foreign embassies and diplomatic mission in Jakarta are also accredited to ASEAN. The presence of the ASEAN Headquarters has made Jakarta a diplomatic hub in Southeast Asia in some regards.

In the late 1990s and early 2000s, Indonesia's domestic troubles distracted it from ASEAN matters and consequently reduced its influence within the organisation. However, after the political and economic transformation, from the turmoil of 1998 Reformasi to the relatively open and democratic civil society with rapid economic growth in the 2010s, Indonesia returned to the region's diplomatic stage by assuming its leadership role in ASEAN in 2011. Indonesia is viewed to have weight, international legitimacy and global appeal to draw support and attention from around the world to ASEAN. Indonesia believes that ASEAN can contribute positively to the international community, by promoting economic development and co-operation, improving security, peace, the stability of ASEAN, and making the Southeast Asia region far from conflicts.

Indonesia's bilateral relations with three neighbouring ASEAN members—Malaysia, Singapore, and Vietnam—are not without challenges. If not appropriately managed, it would result in mutual mistrust and suspicion, thus hindering bilateral and regional co-operation. In the era of rising Indonesia, which might assert its leadership role within ASEAN, the problem could become more significant. Nevertheless, the rise of Indonesia should be regarded in the sense of optimism. First, although Indonesia is likely to become assertive, the general tone of its foreign policy is mainly liberal and accommodating. The consolidation of the Indonesian democratic government played a key role and influence in ASEAN. The second, institutional web of ASEAN will sustain engagements and regular meetings between regional elites, thus deepening their mutual understanding and personal connections.

=== Non-Aligned Movement (NAM) ===
Indonesia is also a founding member of the Non-Aligned Movement (NAM) and chaired and hosted the 1992 Non-Aligned Movement Summit. Indonesia plays a crucial role in the organization, as a founder and in determining the direction of the Non-Aligned Movement. Indonesia led the NAM's position away from the rhetoric of north–south confrontation and instead advocated for expanded north–south cooperation in development. Indonesia continues to be a prominent leader of the Non-Aligned Movement and is generally constructive to the organization's progress.

=== Organization of Islamic Cooperation (OIC) ===
Indonesia has the world's largest Muslim population and is a member of OIC. It carefully considers the interests of Islamic solidarity in its foreign policy decisions but generally has been an influence for moderation in the OIC.

=== Asia-Pacific Economic Cooperation (APEC) ===
Indonesia has been a strong supporter of the Asia-Pacific Economic Cooperation (APEC) forum. Indonesia has hosted two APEC summits, the 1994 APEC Summit and the 2013 APEC Summit. Indonesia emphasized the importance of trade and investment for the prosperity of APEC member countries. APEC members agreed to implement free trade in the region by 2010 for industrialized countries and 2020 for developing countries. As the largest economy in Southeast Asia, Indonesia also belongs to other economic groupings such as G20 and Developing 8 Countries (D-8).

=== G20 major economies ===
In 2008, Indonesia was admitted as a member of the G20, as the only ASEAN member state in the group. Through its membership in the global economic powerhouse that accounted of 85% of the global economy, Indonesia is keen to position itself as a mouthpiece for ASEAN countries, and as a representative of the developing world within the G20. Bali, Indonesia had played host to the 2022 G20 Summit.

=== BRICS ===
Indonesia became a full member of BRICS on 6 January 2025. BRICS is an intergovernmental organization comprising ten countries – Brazil, Russia, India, China, South Africa, Egypt, Ethiopia, Indonesia, Iran and the United Arab Emirates.

=== IGGI and CGI ===
After 1966, Indonesia welcomed and maintained close relations with the international donor community, particularly the United States, western Europe, Australia, and Japan, through the meetings of the Inter-Governmental Group on Indonesia (IGGI) and its successor, the Consultative Group on Indonesia (CGI), which coordinated substantial foreign economic assistance. Problems in Timor and Indonesia's reluctance to implement economic reform at times complicated Indonesia's relationship with donors. In 1992 the IGGI aid coordination group ceased to meet and the coordination activities were transferred to meetings arranged by the World Bank through the CGI. The CGI, in turn, ceased activities in 2007 when the Indonesian government suggested that an internationally organised aid coordination program was no longer needed.

== International disputes ==
Indonesia has a number of outlying and remote islands, some of which are inhabited by multiple pirate groups that regularly attack ships in the Strait of Malacca in the north, and illegal fishing crews known for penetrating Australian and Filipino waters. At the same time, Indonesian waters are the target of large-scale illegal fishing activities by foreign vessels.

Indonesia has some present and historic territorial disputes with neighboring nations, such as:

- Ambalat Block in dispute with Malaysia (ongoing, overlapping EEZ line drawn by both countries)
- Ashmore and Cartier Islands in dispute with Australia (ongoing, the islands known by Indonesians as Pulau Pasir)
- Fatu Sinai Island (Pulau Batek) formerly disputed with Timor-Leste (settled, Timor-Leste ceded the island to Indonesia in August 2004)
- Miangas Island formerly disputed with Insular Government of the Philippine Islands (settled, part of Dutch East Indies and now Indonesia's territory as of Island of Palmas Case)
- Northern waters off Natuna Islands in dispute with China and Taiwan (ongoing; overlapping with Chinese nine-dash line claim)
- Sipadan and Ligitan Islands formerly disputed with Malaysia (settled, part of Malaysia's territory per International Court of Justice's decision in 2002)

== Diplomatic relations ==
List of countries which Indonesia maintains diplomatic relations with:

#	Country	Date
1	Egypt	10 June 1947
2	India	16 April 1949
3	Netherlands	October 1949
4	Belgium	14 November 1949
5	Philippines	24 November 1949
6	United Kingdom	19 December 1949
7	Australia	27 December 1949
8	Greece	27 December 1949
9	Myanmar	27 December 1949
10	United States	28 December 1949
11	Italy	29 December 1949
12	France	4 January 1950
13	Norway	25 January 1950
14	Czech Republic	2 February 1950
15	Russia	3 February 1950
16	Turkey	12 February 1950
17	Denmark	15 February 1950
18	Romania	20 February 1950
19	Iraq	27 February 1950
20	Jordan	27 February 1950
21	Lebanon	27 February 1950
22	Syria	27 February 1950
23	Thailand	7 March 1950
—	Holy See	13 March 1950
24	China	13 April 1950
25	Pakistan	28 April 1950
26	Saudi Arabia	1 May 1950
27	Portugal	13 May 1950
28	Afghanistan	20 May 1950
29	Iran	July 1950
30	Sweden	23 November 1950
31	Switzerland	2 November 1951
32	Luxembourg	8 January 1952
33	Germany	25 June 1952
34	Sri Lanka	6 August 1952
35	Canada	9 October 1952
36	Brazil	March 1953
37	Mexico	6 April 1953
38	Finland	1 September 1954
39	Serbia	4 November 1954
40	Austria	20 November 1954
41	Hungary	26 June 1955
42	Poland	19 September 1955
43	Vietnam	30 December 1955
44	Argentina	30 July 1956
45	Bulgaria	20 September 1956
46	Mongolia	21 December 1956
47	Sudan	10 March 1957
48	Laos	30 August 1957
49	Malaysia	31 August 1957
50	Spain	28 February 1958
51	Japan	15 April 1958
52	New Zealand	28 June 1958
53	Cambodia	13 February 1959
54	Ghana	2 September 1959
55	Venezuela	10 October 1959
56	Cuba	22 January 1960
57	Morocco	19 April 1960
58	Guinea	27 April 1960
59	Tunisia	12 November 1960
60	Somalia	21 December 1960
61	Nepal	25 December 1960
62	Ethiopia	20 June 1961
63	Yemen	21 April 1962
64	Algeria	20 December 1963
65	Bolivia	1963
66	Democratic Republic of the Congo	1963
67	Tanzania	25 January 1964
68	North Korea	16 April 1964
69	Nigeria	5 March 1965
70	Mali	21 June 1965
71	Albania	18 August 1965
72	Chile	29 September 1965
73	Liberia	1965
74	Uruguay	9 June 1966
75	Singapore	7 September 1967
76	Kuwait	28 February 1968
77	Bangladesh	1 May 1972
78	South Korea	18 September 1973
79	Trinidad and Tobago	12 October 1973
80	Fiji	17 June 1974
81	Maldives	2 September 1974
82	Madagascar	13 December 1974
83	Peru	12 August 1975
84	Papua New Guinea	16 September 1975
85	Zambia	18 November 1975
86	Suriname	24 January 1976
87	United Arab Emirates	30 April 1976
88	Qatar	10 November 1976
89	Bahamas	5 May 1977
90	Oman	5 December 1977
91	Panama	27 March 1979
92	Djibouti	6 September 1979
93	Kenya	15 October 1979
94	Malta	1 December 1979
95	Samoa	17 March 1980
96	Ecuador	29 April 1980
97	Colombia	15 September 1980
98	Senegal	3 October 1980
99	Jamaica	17 December 1981
100	Gambia	30 May 1982
101	Gabon	3 June 1982
102	Ivory Coast	4 June 1982
103	Paraguay	29 November 1982
104	Comoros	19 March 1983
105	Mauritius	27 May 1983
106	Iceland	13 June 1983
107	Solomon Islands	28 July 1983
108	Brunei	1 January 1984
109	Rwanda	16 January 1984
110	Bahrain	23 July 1984
111	Ireland	4 September 1984
112	Costa Rica	9 January 1985
113	Seychelles	16 December 1985
114	Zimbabwe	14 August 1986
115	Cyprus	15 December 1987
116	Nicaragua	11 April 1988
117	Burundi	31 May 1988
118	Uganda	12 January 1989
—	State of Palestine	19 October 1989
119	Eswatini	12 April 1991
120	Namibia	13 May 1991
121	Federated States of Micronesia	16 July 1991
122	Mozambique	4 October 1991
123	Libya	17 October 1991
124	Grenada	28 February 1992
125	Guatemala	29 April 1992
126	Ukraine	11 June 1992
127	Cameroon	16 June 1992
128	Uzbekistan	23 June 1992
129	Burkina Faso	8 August 1992
130	Croatia	2 September 1992
131	Armenia	22 September 1992
132	Azerbaijan	24 September 1992
133	Slovenia	12 October 1992
134	Turkmenistan	10 December 1992
135	Slovakia	1 January 1993
136	Georgia	25 January 1993
137	Moldova	12 February 1993
138	Kyrgyzstan	5 April 1993
139	Marshall Islands	21 May 1993
140	North Macedonia	25 May 1993
141	Kazakhstan	2 June 1993
142	Belarus	18 June 1993
143	Estonia	5 July 1993
144	Lithuania	15 July 1993
145	Eritrea	2 August 1993
146	Latvia	25 August 1993
147	Lesotho	4 November 1993
148	Saint Vincent and the Grenadines	30 November 1993
149	Saint Lucia	2 February 1994
150	Benin	10 March 1994
151	Bosnia and Herzegovina	11 April 1994
152	Dominica	19 April 1994
153	Tonga	27 May 1994
154	South Africa	12 August 1994
155	Tajikistan	27 August 1994
156	Sierra Leone	15 November 1994
157	Vanuatu	3 July 1995
158	Andorra	26 March 1996
159	Guinea-Bissau	12 December 1996
160	Honduras	24 September 1997
161	Liechtenstein	14 August 1998
162	Guyana	27 August 1999
163	Angola	7 August 2001
164	Timor-Leste	2 July 2002
165	Republic of the Congo	2004
166	Togo	2005
167	Palau	6 July 2007
168	Monaco	17 December 2010
169	Dominican Republic	20 September 2011
170	Montenegro	21 September 2011
171	Niger	21 September 2011
172	Antigua and Barbuda	23 September 2011
173	El Salvador	23 September 2011
174	San Marino	26 September 2011
175	Mauritania	27 September 2011
176	São Tomé and Príncipe	27 September 2011
177	Bhutan	15 December 2011
178	Botswana	28 March 2012
179	Tuvalu	1 October 2012
180	Haiti	21 November 2012
181	Cape Verde	5 December 2012
182	Nauru	21 December 2012
183	Kiribati	8 May 2013
184	Saint Kitts and Nevis	30 January 2014
185	Belize	9 July 2014
186	Malawi	29 September 2014
187	Central African Republic	21 September 2016
188	Chad	22 September 2016
189	Equatorial Guinea	22 September 2016
190	Barbados	26 June 2019
—	Cook Islands	12 July 2019
—	Niue	12 July 2019
191	South Sudan	20 September 2022

== Bilateral relations ==
=== ASEAN ===
Country	Formal relations began	Notes
Brunei	1 January 1984	See Brunei–Indonesia relations: The Republic of Indonesia established diplomatic relations with Brunei Darussalam on 1 January 1984. Brunei Darussalam was recognised by Indonesia in 1984.; Although they do not share a direct land border, Indonesia and Brunei share the island of Borneo. Overall relations between the two countries were progressing well and that both sides continued to enjoy strong ties in a wide spectrum of co-operations; including trade and investment, tourism, agriculture, marine and fisheries, health, defence, transnational crimes, education, youth, culture and people-to-people contacts.; Indonesia has an embassy in Bandar Seri Begawan, while Brunei has an embassy in Jakarta.; Both countries also members of the Asia-Pacific Economic Cooperation, Non-Aligned Movement, Group of 77, Asia Cooperation Dialogue and Organisation of Islamic Cooperation.
Cambodia	13 February 1959	See Cambodia–Indonesia relations: The relationship between ancient Indonesia and Cambodia dated back from the kingdom of Chenla and Javan Sailendra also Srivijaya; it was mentioned that king Jayavarman II had resided for some times in Java during the reign of Sailendras, and in 802 declare sovereignty of Cambodia from Java and proclaimed himself as universal monarch thus started the Angkor period.; During the Sukarno reign in the 1960s, the president of Indonesia has visited Cambodia and vice versa prince Norodom Sihanouk also visited Indonesia.; In 1992, Indonesia is among the countries that provides troops for United Nations Transitional Authority in Cambodia. Indonesia also supported Cambodia membership to ASEAN in 1999. Indonesia also among the countries that provide aid to Angkor restoration project, especially the three main gates of Angkor Royal Palace archaeological site near Phimeanakas site. Indonesia is also appointed as observer in 2008–2013 Cambodian–Thai border crisis.; Indonesia has an embassy in Phnom Penh, while Cambodia has an embassy in Jakarta.
Laos	30 August 1957	See Indonesia–Laos relations Since established diplomatic relations in 1957, both countries enjoy cordial relations. Indonesia has an embassy in Vientiane, while Laos has an embassy in Jakarta. Indonesia supported and welcomed Laotian membership to ASEAN in 1997. Laos and Indonesia agreed to enhance relations to focus on exploring the potential of both countries to co-operate on trade and investment. The two countries expressed a desire to reach further agreements relating to security, tourism, sport, air transport and education. Indonesia through bilateral co-operation assist Laos on capacity building and development in various sectors, through scholarships and trainings for Laotian students.
Malaysia	31 August 1957, severed diplomatic relations 15 September 1963, restored 31 August 1967	See Indonesia–Malaysia relations: Despite fighting each other during the Indonesia-Malaysia Confrontation, Indonesia and Malaysia enjoy friendly relations. The populations of both countries have cordial relations and trade between the two countries has greatly increased over the years.; Indonesia has an embassy in Kuala Lumpur and consulates general in Johor Bahru, George Town, Kota Kinabalu and Kuching. Malaysia has an embassy in Jakarta, a consulate general in Medan and consulates in Pekanbaru and Pontianak.; Indonesia and Malaysia has the same ethnic population that belongs to the Austronesian group and sharing the same language although minor differences in vocabulary.; Both countries also members of the Asia-Pacific Economic Cooperation, Non-Aligned Movement, Organisation of Islamic Cooperation, Cairns Group and Indian-Ocean Rim Association.; Relations were deteriorated under President Sukarno, whose opposition to the formation of Malaysia led to a confrontation between the two countries. However, relations were restored following a government transition in Indonesia.; Currently, both countries are in a territorial dispute over the oil rich islands of Ambalat. Previously, they were over territorial disputes over the islands of Ligitan and Sipadan, which were won by Malaysia.; The Indonesian migrant workers (Indonesian: TKI/Tenaga Kerja Indonesia) have become the important issue between both countries. The problems concerning migrant workers such as illegal immigration, crime, human trafficking, abuse, poor treatment and extortion upon migrant workers. Since 2009 Indonesia has temporarily stop sending domestic workers to Malaysia until both countries agree on ways to protect them. Indonesia resumed sending migrant workers to Malaysia in May 2011 as both countries signed a memorandum of understanding (MoU) about worker protection by the end of April 2011.
Myanmar	27 December 1949	See Indonesia–Myanmar relations: Both Indonesia and Myanmar are promoting the two countries' trade volume. The trade volume is estimated to reach up to $1 billion in 2016.; Indonesia has offered to purchase 300,000 tons of rice from Myanmar, with prospects of buying more in the future.; Indonesia has an embassy in Yangon, while Myanmar has an embassy in Jakarta.; Indonesia supports Myanmar's democratisation process.
Philippines	24 November 1949	See Indonesia–Philippines relations: Indonesia and the Philippines are both archipelagic countries dominated by an ethnic population that belongs to the Austronesian group.; Both countries established their bilateral and diplomatic relations in 1949. The Indonesian Government has opened its consular office in Manila but it was not until the mid-1950s that an embassy was established headed by an ambassador. Indonesia also has a consulate general in Davao City.; The Philippines has an embassy in Jakarta and a consulate general in Manado.; A treaty of friendship was signed in 1951. This Treaty constituted the basic relationship of both countries, covering several aspects such as maintenance of peace and friendship, settlement of disputes by diplomatic and peaceful means, traffic arrangements for citizens of both countries and activities to promote co-operation in the area of trade and cultural, which include the political, social-economic and security matters of both countries.; Both countries are also members of the Asia-Pacific Economic Cooperation, Non-Aligned Movement, Cairns Group, G20 developing nations and the East ASEAN Growth Triangle together with Brunei and Malaysia.; Both countries peacefully settled their maritime borders after 20 years of diplomatic talks.; Both countries have high cooperation in fields of economy, tourism, culture, and defense.
Singapore	7 September 1967	See Indonesia–Singapore relations: In August 2005, Singapore and Indonesia signed a memorandum of understanding to expand aviation rights between the two countries.; On 3 October 2005, Prime Minister Lee Hsien Loong met Indonesian President Susilo Bambang Yudhoyono in Bali, just two days after the Bali bombings. They agreed to strengthen the fight against terrorism and also discussed co-operation in the fields of economy, trade and investment.; Relations with Indonesia are generally good, though current outstanding issues include the bans on the export of sand, and granite; both of which Singapore's construction industry is reliant on.; Indonesia has an embassy in Singapore.; Singapore has an embassy in Jakarta and consulates general in Batam and Medan.; Both countries are also members of the Asia-Pacific Economic Cooperation, Non-Aligned Movement, Indian-Ocean Rim Association, Group of 77 and Asia Cooperation Dialogue.
Thailand	7 March 1950	See Indonesia–Thailand relations: Indonesia and Thailand are viewed as natural allies.; Indonesia is Thailand's third most important trade partner within ASEAN, with bilateral trade worth $8.7 billion in 2007. Trade between the two countries is set to grow over the years.; Following the military takeover of the government in Thailand in May 2014, Indonesia supports the restoration of democracy in Thailand. Indonesia urged the military and civilian elements in Thailand to work together to quickly restore the political situation in Thailand.; Indonesia has an embassy in Bangkok and a consulate in Songkhla.; Thailand has an embassy in Jakarta and honorary consulates in Denpasar, Medan and Surabaya.; Both countries are also members of the Asia-Pacific Economic Cooperation, Non-Aligned Movement, Cairns Group, Indian-Ocean Rim Association and G20 developing nations.
Timor-Leste	2 July 2002	See Indonesia–Timor-Leste relations: Timor-Leste and Indonesia share the island of Timor. Indonesia invaded the former Portuguese colony in 1975 and annexed it in 1976, maintaining East Timor as its 27th province until a United Nations-sponsored referendum in 1999, in which the people of Timor-Leste chose independence. Following a United Nations interim administration, Timor-Leste gained independence in 2002.; Despite the traumatic past, relations with Indonesia are good. Indonesia is by far the largest trading partner of Timor-Leste (Approximately 50% of imports, 2005) and is steadily increasing its share.; Problems to be solved include, Indonesia-Timor-Leste Boundary Committee meetings to survey and delimit land boundary; and Indonesia is seeking resolution of East Timorese refugees in Indonesia.
Vietnam	30 December 1955	See Indonesia–Vietnam relations: Formal relations started in 1955 for the consulate general level. Soedibjo Wirjowerdojo (former chargé d'affaires of Indonesian Embassy in Peking, China from year of 1953–1955) was appointed to be The First Indonesian Consul General to Vietnam, and located in Hanoi.; Both countries are also members of the Asia-Pacific Economic Cooperation, Non-Aligned Movement, Cairns Group, Group of 77 and CIVETS.; President Megawati Sukarnoputri of Indonesia visited Vietnam in June 2003. At this time the two countries signed a "Declaration on the Framework of Friendly and Comprehensive Cooperation Entering the 21st Century".; In May 2005 President Susilo Bambang Yudhoyono of Indonesia visited Vietnam.; In the December of the same year festivities were organized in the respective capital cities to celebrate the 50th anniversary of the establishment of diplomatic ties.; Indonesia has an embassy in Hanoi and a consulate general in Ho Chi Minh City.; Vietnam has an embassy in Jakarta.

=== Africa ===
Country	Formal Relations Began	Notes
Algeria	1963	See Algeria–Indonesia relations: The relationship between two countries is mostly founded on common religious and anti-colonialism solidarity, as Indonesia and Algeria are Muslim-majority countries that also once fell under colonialism.; Algeria recognised Indonesia's role on supporting their country on gaining independence in 1962.; Both countries agreed on expanding co-operations and strengthening relations.; Algeria has an embassy in Jakarta that also accredited to Singapore and Brunei Darussalam, while Indonesia has an embassy in Algiers.; Both countries are members of the NAM, Group of 77 and OIC.
Angola	7 August 2001	See Angola–Indonesia relations: Both countries established diplomatic relations on 7 August 2001.; Indonesia supported Angola's fight against apartheid South Africa and its territorial integrity against separatist movements.; Angola supported Indonesia's sovereignty over East Timor and its territorial claims in the South China Sea.; Indonesia is accredited to Angola from its embassy in Windhoek, Namibia.; Angola established an embassy in Jakarta in August 2023. The embassy got inaugurated on 30 April 2025.
Botswana	28 March 2012	Both countries established diplomatic relations on 28 March 2012: Botswana is represented in Indonesia by its embassy in Canberra, Australia.; Indonesia is represented in Botswana by its embassy in Pretoria, South Africa.
Cameroon	16 June 1992	Both countries established diplomatic relations on 16 June 1992; Indonesia has an embassy in Yaoundé which has begun operations since 2024.; Both nations are members of the Group of 77 and the Non-Aligned Movement.
Democratic Republic of the Congo	1963	See Democratic Republic of the Congo–Indonesia relations: Both countries established diplomatic relations in 1963.
Egypt	1947	See Egypt–Indonesia relations: The Egyptian Ministry of Foreign Affairs officially acknowledged the Jam'iyya Istiqlâl Indonesia on 22 March 1946, as the representative of the self-claimed Indonesian Republican government.; The Prime Minister of Egypt and the Ministry of Foreign Affairs of Indonesia signed the Treaty of Friendship and Cordiality between the two countries on 10 June 1947, beginning both diplomatic relationships.; Indonesia has an embassy in Cairo and Egypt has an embassy in Jakarta since 25 February 1950.; Gamel Abdel Nasser of Egypt and Sukarno of Indonesia were two of the five founding members of the Non-Aligned Movement.; Both countries are members of the OIC, the Non-Aligned Movement, and the G20 developing nations.
Ethiopia	1961	See Ethiopia–Indonesia relations: Both countries established diplomatic relations in 1961, followed by the opening of Indonesian embassy in Addis Ababa in 1964.; Ethiopia has an embassy in Jakarta.
Kenya	1979	See Indonesia–Kenya relations: Indonesia has an embassy in Nairobi, also accredited to Mauritius, Seychelles, and Uganda, while Kenya established an embassy in Jakarta in 2022.; Both countries are partners in multilateral organisations, such as the WTO, IORA and NAM.
Liberia	1965	See Indonesia–Liberia relations The diplomatic relations was officially established in 1965, however it was not until 2013 that both leaders of each countries visited each other's to further the co-operations.
Libya	17 October 1991	See Indonesia–Libya relations: Both countries established diplomatic relations on 17 October 1991; Indonesia has an embassy in Tripoli and Libya has an embassy in Jakarta.; Both countries are members of the OIC and the Non-Aligned Movement.
Madagascar	13 December 1974	See Indonesia–Madagascar relations: The ancestors of Madagascar people came from Indonesia, sailed across Indian Ocean, back in early 8th to 9th century CE.; Indonesia has an embassy in Antananarivo, while Madagascar has not established an embassy in Jakarta yet.; Malagasy language and Indonesian language shared similar words, such as hand: ˈtananə (Malagasy), tangan (Indonesian); skin: ˈhulitse (Malagasy), kulit (Indonesian); white: ˈfuti (Malagasy), putih (Indonesian).
Mauritania	27 September 2011	Mauritania has an embassy in Jakarta which opened in 2020.; Indonesia is represented in Mauritania by its embassy in Rabat, Morocco.; Both countries are full members of the Organisation of Islamic Cooperation.
Morocco	1960	See Indonesia–Morocco relations: Indonesia and Morocco shared similarity as Muslim-majority countries.; Morocco praised Indonesia as a strong democratic nation, and pointed that both countries facing the same challenges of separatism and terrorism.; Diplomatic relations were established in 1960. Indonesia has an embassy in Rabat, while Morocco has an embassy in Jakarta.; both countries are members of the WTO, NAM and OIC.
Mozambique	4 October 1991	See Indonesia–Mozambique relations: Indonesia has an embassy in Maputo, also accredited to Malawi. Mozambique maintains an embassy in Jakarta, which also serves Malaysia, East Timor, Philippines, Singapore and Thailand.; The two countries have signed a preferential trade agreement in 2019.
Namibia	1991	See Indonesia–Namibia relations: Indonesia has an embassy in Windhoek.; Namibia is accredited to Indonesia from its high commission in Kuala Lumpur, Malaysia.
Nigeria	5 March 1965	See Indonesia–Nigeria relations Both countries established diplomatic relations on 5 March 1965: Indonesia has an embassy in Abuja and Nigeria has an embassy in Jakarta.; Both countries are members of the OIC, the Non-Aligned Movement, the G20 developing nations, and the Next Eleven.
Rwanda	16 January 1984	See Indonesia–Rwanda relations: Both countries established diplomatic relations on 16 January 1984.; Rwanda opened an embassy in Jakarta on 6 June 2024.; Indonesia has a non-resident embassy in Dar es Salaam.
Senegal	3 October 1980	See Indonesia–Senegal relations: Both countries established diplomatic relations on 3 October 1980.; Indonesia recognizes Senegal's potential as its entrance to penetrate the West African market.; Indonesia has opened an embassy in Dakar since 1982.; Senegalese embassy in Kuala Lumpur is accredited to Indonesia.; Both countries are members of the OIC and the Non-Aligned Movement.
South Africa	12 August 1994	See Indonesia–South Africa relations: Both countries established diplomatic relations on 12 August 1994; Indonesia has an embassy in Pretoria and South Africa has an embassy in Jakarta.; Both countries are members of the G-20 major economies, the Non-Aligned Movement, the Indian Ocean Rim Association and the G20 developing nations.
Sudan	10 March 1957	See Indonesia-Sudan relations: During a visit by Sudanese Foreign Minister Ali Karti to Jakarta in February 2012, both countries have agreed to foster bilateral relations in politics, science, education and economic sectors.; Indonesia has an embassy in Khartoum.; Sudan has an embassy in Jakarta.; Both countries have Muslim-majority population and both are members of the Organisation of Islamic Cooperation and the Non-Aligned Movement.
South Sudan	20 September 2022	See Indonesia-South Sudan relations: Both countries established diplomatic relations on 20 September 2022; Indonesia recognized South Sudan on 12 July 2011.
Tanzania	25 January 1964	See Indonesia–Tanzania relations: The relations between Indonesia and Tanzania are mostly in agriculture sector, where Indonesia provides training for Tanzanian farmers.; Indonesia has an embassy in Dar es Salaam, while Tanzania has an embassy in Jakarta.; Both countries are members of multilateral organisations such as World Trade Organization (WTO), the Group of 77 and Non-Aligned Movement.
Tunisia	1960	See Indonesia–Tunisia relations: Tunisia and Indonesia are partners in capacity building and partnership for democracy.; Indonesia hails Tunisia as a shining example of democratic transition in Arab world.; The diplomatic relations dated back to the 1950s when Indonesia supports Tunisian independence from France.; Indonesia has an embassy in Tunis, while Tunisia has an embassy in Jakarta.; Both countries are the member of Organisation of Islamic Cooperation and the Non-Aligned Movement.
Zimbabwe	14 August 1986	See Indonesia–Zimbabwe relations: Both countries established diplomatic relations on 14 August 1986; The two nations signed a memorandum of understanding on the establishment of a joint commission on trade and investment in May 2011.; Indonesia has an embassy in Harare.; Zimbabwe has an embassy in Jakarta.

=== Americas ===
Country	Formal Relations Began	Notes
Argentina	30 July 1956	See Argentina–Indonesia relations: Since the diplomatic relations established in 1956, the bilateral relations between Argentina and Indonesia were becoming increasingly more strategic.; Indonesia supports Argentina on the Malvinas issue.; Argentina has an embassy in Jakarta, while Indonesia has an embassy in Buenos Aires.; Both countries are members of Group of 77, the G-20 major economies, the G20 developing nations, and Forum of East Asia-Latin America Cooperation.; Indonesia is the second-largest destination for Argentine exports to Asia after China, and the largest one in Southeast Asia. While Argentina is South America's second-largest importer of Indonesian products after Brazil.
Brazil	March 1950	See Brazil–Indonesia relations: Brazil and Indonesia possess the largest tropical rainforest of the world that contains the world's richest biodiversity, which gave them a vital role in global environment issues, such as ensuring tropical forests protection.; Both countries leading the list of megadiverse countries with Indonesia second only to Brazil.; Brazil expects to expand its co-operation with Indonesia in multiple areas, including agriculture and high-technology industry.; Both countries are members of World Trade Organization (WTO), Forum of East Asia-Latin America Cooperation and the G-20 major economies.; By the first quarter of the 21st century, both countries are expected to emerge as the rising global power.
Canada	9 October 1952	See Canada–Indonesia relations: Canada has an embassy in Jakarta (World Trade Centre I).; Indonesia has an embassy in Ottawa (55 Parkdale Avenue) and consulates-general in Toronto (129 Jarvis Street) and Vancouver (1630 Alberni Street).; Both countries are full members of the G-20 major economies, of the Cairns Group and of the Asia-Pacific Economic Cooperation.
Chile	29 September 1965	See Chile–Indonesia relations: Chile has an embassy in Jakarta.; Indonesia has an embassy in Santiago.
Colombia	15 September 1980	See Colombia–Indonesia relations: Colombia has an embassy in Jakarta.; Indonesia has an embassy in Bogotá.; Both countries are members of CIVETS, the Cairns Group and the Forum of East Asia-Latin America Cooperation.
Cuba	1960	See Cuba–Indonesia relations: During the administration Sukarno in the 1960s, Indonesia and Cuba enjoyed exceptionally close relationship.; The relations between two countries mostly focused on sports and health.; Cuba has an embassy in Jakarta, while Indonesia has an embassy in Havana that also accredited to the Commonwealth of the Bahamas, the Dominican Republic, Haiti and Jamaica.; Indonesia supports Cuba in the Guantanamo Bay issue.; both countries are full members of Group of 77, NAM and FEALAC.
Ecuador	29 April 1980	See Ecuador-Indonesia relations: Ecuador has an embassy in Jakarta.; Indonesia opened an embassy in Quito on 11 November 2010.; Both countries are members of the Forum of East Asia-Latin America Cooperation and the Non-Aligned Movement.
Mexico	1953	See Indonesia–Mexico relations Diplomatic relations between both nations were officially established in 1953.: Indonesia has an embassy in Mexico City.; Mexico has an embassy in Jakarta.; Both countries sees their counterpart as their strategic partners in each regions.; Both countries are partners in multilateral organizations such as the WTO, FEALAC, APEC and G-20.
Panama	27 March 1979	See Indonesia-Panama relations: Indonesia sees strategic and geographic importance of Panama as their gate to Central America as well as to reach the Caribbean region, while Panama has also recognized the strategic importance of Indonesia in ASEAN.; Panama has an embassy in Jakarta; Indonesia has an embassy in Panama City.; Both countries are members of the Forum of East Asia-Latin America Cooperation.
Peru	12 August 1975	See Indonesia–Peru relations: Both nations see each other as attractive markets with good prospects and potentials, and seek to boost trade relations.; Indonesia has an embassy in Lima.; Peru has an embassy in Jakarta.
Suriname	24 January 1976	See Indonesia–Suriname relations: Indonesia and Suriname have a special relationship, based upon shared common history as former colonies of the Dutch Empire.; Large numbers of Javanese migrated to Suriname to work on plantations during the late 19th and early 20th-centuries.; Indonesia has an embassy in Paramaribo.; Suriname has an embassy in Jakarta.; Both countries committed to expand and improve their relations covering trade, agriculture and cultural sectors.; Indonesia and Suriname are partners in multilateral organisations such as the WTO and FEALAC.
United States	1949	See Indonesia–United States relations The United States has important economic, commercial, and security interests in Indonesia. It remains a lynchpin of regional security due to its strategic location astride a number of key international maritime straits, particularly the Malacca Strait. Relations between Indonesia and the US are positive and have advanced since the election of President Yudhoyono in October 2004. The US played a role in Indonesian independence in the late 1940s and appreciated Indonesia's role as an anti-communist bulwark during the Cold War. Cooperative relations are maintained today, although no formal security treaties bind the two countries. The United States and Indonesia share the common goal of maintaining peace, security, and stability in the region and engaging in a dialogue on threats to regional security. Cooperation between the US and Indonesia on counter-terrorism has increased steadily since 2002, as terrorist attacks in Bali (October 2002 and October 2005), Jakarta (August 2003 and September 2004) and other regional locations demonstrated the presence of terrorist organisations, principally Jemaah Islamiyah, in Indonesia. The United States has welcomed Indonesia's contributions to regional security, especially its leading role in helping restore democracy in Cambodia and in mediating territorial disputes in the South China Sea.
Venezuela	9 October 1959	See Indonesia–Venezuela relations: Since the diplomatic relations established in 1959, Indonesia and Venezuela enjoy friendly ties.; Indonesia supports Venezuela in the Guyana–Venezuela territorial dispute.; both countries agreed to expand the trade and investment relations, especially in tourism, technology, chemicals and natural gas sectors.; Indonesia has an embassy in Caracas, while Venezuela has an embassy in Jakarta.; Indonesia and Venezuela are partners in multilateral organisations such as the WTO, NAM and FEALAC.

=== Asia ===
Country	Formal Relations Began	Notes
Afghanistan	20 May 1950	See Afghanistan–Indonesia relations: Afghanistan has an embassy in Jakarta.; Indonesia reopened its embassy in Kabul on 14 February 2022. Despite the embassy reopening, the Indonesian government remained not acknowledging the Taliban government.; In January 2018, Indonesian president Joko Widodo visited Afghanistan.
Bahrain	23 July 1984	See Bahrain–Indonesia relations: Bahrain sees Indonesia as an important market in ASEAN, while Indonesia sees Bahrain as one of the gates to enter Gulf Cooperation Council nations.; Bahrain has an embassy in Jakarta.; Indonesia has an embassy in Manama.
Bangladesh	1 May 1972	See Bangladesh–Indonesia relations: Indonesia is a country with the world largest Muslim population, whereas Bangladesh is the fourth largest Muslim country. Indonesia and Bangladesh are partners in the Organisation of Islamic Cooperation, Indian-Ocean Rim Association and the Developing 8 Countries. Bangladesh has an embassy in Jakarta, whereas Indonesia has an embassy in Dhaka. Since the official bilateral relations were established in 1972, both countries enjoy cordial and friendly relations.
China	13 April 1950	See China–Indonesia relations Countries which signed cooperation documents related to the Belt and Road Initiative: China and Indonesia established diplomatic relations on 13 April 1950, which was suspended on 30 October 1967 due to the occurrence of the 30 September event of 1965. Indonesia also supports China on the Diaoyu (Senkaku) issue.; The bilateral relations began to ease since the 1980s. Foreign Minister Qian Qichen of China met with President Suharto and State Minister Moerdiono of Indonesia in 1989 to discuss the resumption of diplomatic relations of the two countries. In December 1989, the two sides held talks on the technical issues regarding the normalisation of bilateral relations and signed the Minutes. Foreign Minister Ali Alatas of Indonesia visited China on invitation in July 1990 and the two sides issued the Agreement on the Settlement of Indonesia's Debt Obligation to China and the Communique on the Resumption of Diplomatic Relations between the two countries. The two countries issued the "Communiqué on the Restoration of Diplomatic Relations between the Two Countries".; Premier Li Peng visited Indonesia on 6 August 1990. In his talks with President Suharto, the two sides expressed their willingness to improve relations on the basis of the Five Principles of Peaceful Co-Existence and the Ten Principles of the Bandung Conference. On 8 August 1990, the Foreign Ministers of China and Indonesia signed a Memorandum of Understanding on the Resumption of Diplomatic Relations. The resumption of formal diplomatic relations between China and Indonesia was announced the same day.; Both countries are members of the G-20 major economies and APEC.
Hong Kong (Special Administrative Region of China)		See Hong Kong–Indonesia relations: Indonesia has a consulate general in Hong Kong located at Causeway Bay.; The Hong Kong Economic & Trade Office in Jakarta represents Hong Kong in Indonesia.; A memorandum of understanding on cultural co-operation and a joint statement on labour co-operation were signed between the two governments.
India	2 February 1949	See India–Indonesia relations: India and Indonesia are founding members of Non-Aligned Movement.; India had supported Indonesian independence and Nehru had raised the Indonesian question in the United Nations Security Council.; Indonesia views India as a "distant-cousin" and fellow fighter against colonialism. Indonesia's President Sukarno called for both nations to "intensify the cordial relations" that had existed "for more than 1,000 years" as crystallized in the Treaty of Friendship of March 1951.; India and Indonesia had signed three security agreements in 1956, 1958 and 1960.; India provided military assistance to Indonesia's counterinsurgency campaign in the 1950s.; As part of India's Look East Policy both countries signed 2005 India-Indonesia Strategic Partnership Agreement which was a milestone in the bilateral relationship of both countries.; India provides support and training for the Indonesian Air Force's Sukhoi fighter jet and pilots.; India has an embassy in Jakarta and Indonesia operates an embassy in Delhi.
Iran	1950	See Indonesia–Iran relations: Indonesia and Iran are Muslim-majority countries, despite the differences in its religious orientation. Indonesia has the largest Muslim Sunni population in the world, while Iran is a predominantly Shiite nation.; As Islamic countries that have among the largest Muslim populations in the world, Iran and Indonesia hold themselves responsible for promoting Islam as a peaceful religion. Diplomatic relations has been established since 1950. Indonesia has an embassy in Tehran, and Iran has an embassy in Jakarta. Both countries are full members of the World Trade Organization (WTO), The Non-Aligned Movement, Organisation of Islamic Cooperation (OIC), and Developing 8 Countries.; Jakarta had offered to help mediate the Iranian nuclear dispute, Jakarta is on good terms with Iran and other Middle East countries, as well as with the West.
Iraq	1950	See Indonesia–Iraq relations: Indonesia and Iraq share similarity as Muslim-majority countries. Both countries share their experiences in rebuilding and development. Indonesia has an embassy in Baghdad, while Iraq has an embassy in Jakarta. Both countries are partners in multilateral organisations, such as World Trade Organization (WTO), The Non-Aligned Movement and Organisation of Islamic Cooperation (OIC).; The two countries established diplomatic relations in 1950 and have signed around 15 agreements to boost bilateral ties. Indonesia has maintained its embassy in Baghdad during various crises, such as the Iraq-Iran War in the 1980s. However, at the height of the Iraq War, Indonesia was forced to temporarily closed its embassy in Baghdad in 2003, and reopen it in June 2011.; In 2003, the Indonesian government and people protested against a US-led military campaign against Baghdad. Over 50,000 Indonesian people crowded the streets of the Indonesian capital, Jakarta, on Sunday, 9 February 2003, to protest the United States' threat of military action against Iraq. After the war ended and Indonesia reopened its embassy in 2011, relations between the two countries have developed at a fast pace. Iraq invited Indonesia's companies to participate in the reconstruction of Iraq.; Traditionally, Indonesia views Iraq as a source of energy resources, such as oil and gas. Iraqi people are familiar with Indonesian exported products such as: tires, soaps, spices, furniture, coal, clothing, palm oil, shoes, paper, automobiles, rubber, and electronic goods.
Israel	Informal relations	See Indonesia–Israel relations: The two countries maintain no formal diplomatic ties, although they maintain limited trade, tourism and security relations.; In 2005, Indonesia said that establishing full diplomatic ties with Israel will only be possible after peace with Palestine has been reached. President Prabowo Subianto reiterated this statement on 28 May 2025.; In 2008, Indonesia signed a medical cooperation agreement with Israel's national emergency medical service worth US$200,000.
Japan	15 April 1958	See Indonesia–Japan relations: Despite being invaded by Japan in World War Two, Indonesia enjoys friendly relations with Japan.; Indonesia has an embassy in Tokyo and a consulate in Osaka. Japan has an embassy in Jakarta and consulates in Medan, Denpasar, Surabaya, and Makassar.; Japan is Indonesia's largest export partner.; Both countries are members of the G-20 major economies and APEC.
Jordan	1950	See Indonesia–Jordan relations: Jordan and Indonesia often share similar stances upon issues in the Middle East, such as the Syrian conflict and the Israeli–Palestinian conflict.; Indonesia is currently Jordan's largest trade partner in ASEAN.; Jordan has an embassy in Jakarta, while Indonesia has an embassy in Amman that also accredited to Palestine.; Both nations are members of the Organisation of Islamic Cooperation and the Non-Aligned Movement.; Jordan serves as the gate for Indonesian Muslim and Christian pilgrims wishing to visit the holy sites in Israel and Palestine.
Kazakhstan	2 June 1993	See Indonesia–Kazakhstan relations: The relations started with Indonesia's recognition of the proclamation of independence of the Republic of Kazakhstan, on 16 December 1991.; Indonesia has an embassy in Astana.; Kazakhstan has an embassy in Jakarta.; Both countries are members of the Asia Cooperation Dialogue and the Organisation of Islamic Cooperation.
North Korea	16 April 1964	See Indonesia–North Korea relations Indonesia is one of the few countries that still maintain cordial relations with North Korea, despite international sanctions and isolation applied upon North Korea concerning its human rights abuses and nuclear missile program. Indonesia has adopted what it calls a "free-and-active" foreign policy, which allows it to be consistent in counting on both Koreas as friends. Both countries share a relationship that dates back to the Sukarno and Kim Il Sung era in the 60s. Indonesia has an embassy in Pyongyang, while North Korea has an embassy in Jakarta. both countries are members of the Non-Aligned Movement. According to a 2014 BBC World Service Poll, 28% of Indonesians view North Korea's influence positively, with 44% expressing a negative view. This shows a deterioration from previous year's poll where 42% of Indonesians view North Korea's influence positively, with 29% expressing a negative view.
South Korea	17 September 1973	See Indonesia–South Korea relations: Indonesia has an embassy in Seoul.; South Korea has an embassy in Jakarta and a consulate in Denpasar.; Scale of bilateral trade between two nation is US$14.88 billion.; Both countries have invested in multiple joint military development projects including the KFX/IFX fighter jet.; South Korea firm Daewoo Shipbuilding and Marine Engineering (DSME) is in final contract negotiations to supply Indonesia with three Type-209 submarines. This will be the largest ever bilateral defence deal valued at US$1.1 billion.; Numerous K-pop performances, such as SMTown Live World Tour III and Music Bank World Tour, have been performed in Indonesia.; Trade in National currencies and moving away from the US dollar.; Both countries are members of the G-20 major economies and APEC.
Kuwait	28 February 1968	See Indonesia–Kuwait relations: Kuwait has an embassy in Jakarta.; Indonesia has an embassy in Kuwait City.; The relations focused on economy and trade sectors, especially on energy (oil) and human resources (migrant workers).
Lebanon	1950	See Indonesia–Lebanon relations: Lebanon has an embassy in Jakarta.; Indonesia has an embassy in Beirut.; Both nations are members of the Organisation of Islamic Cooperation and the Non-Aligned Movement.
Mongolia	22 December 1956	See Indonesia–Mongolia relations: Indonesia and Mongolia established diplomatic relations in 1956.; Mongolia is planning to have a Center of Indonesian Studies, located in Mongolian National University. This institution will serve as a learning center for Mongolian students, professors and common people wishing to learn various aspects of Indonesian studies, includes language, culture, history, politics and economy.; Mongolian embassy in Bangkok is accredited to Indonesia.; Indonesia is accredited to Mongolia from its embassy in Beijing, China.
Nepal	25 December 1960	See Indonesia–Nepal relations Since diplomatic relations were established in 1960, both countries enjoy friendly and cordial relations, although both parties have not established embassies in each counterparts' capitals. Indonesia only established an honorary consulate in Kathmandu, while its embassy in Dhaka, Bangladesh, is also accredited to Nepal. Nepal on the other hand accredited its embassy in Kuala Lumpur, Malaysia, also to Indonesia. Both the countries have multiple cultural proximities and similar view on international issues. Both countries are also partners and founding members of the Non-Aligned Movement (NAM).
Oman	1978	See Indonesia–Oman relations: Oman has an embassy in Jakarta.; Indonesia has an embassy in Muscat that is also accredited to Yemen.; Indonesia and Oman are Muslim majority countries and share same commitments in pursuing global peace and prosperity.
Pakistan	28 April 1950	See Indonesia–Pakistan relations: Indonesia has its embassy in Islamabad and a consulate in Karachi; Pakistan has its embassy in Jakarta and a consulate in Medan.; Both countries are members of the Developing 8 (D-8) countries and the Next Eleven (N-11) Countries. They are also members of the Non-Aligned Movement (NAM) and the Organisation of Islamic Cooperation (OIC).; Bilateral trade between the two countries currently stand at $800 million but both countries are looking at increase this to $2 billion.; There is a preferential trade agreement between the two countries, in effect since 2013.
Palestine	19 October 1989	See Indonesia–Palestine relations: Indonesia has a non-resident embassy in Amman.; Palestine has an embassy in Jakarta.
Qatar	1976	See Indonesia–Qatar relations: Qatar has an embassy in Jakarta.; Indonesia has an embassy in Doha.; Indonesia and Qatar have both signed a number of memorandums of understanding in fields like air transport, tourism, and agricultural cooperation.
Saudi Arabia	1950	See Indonesia–Saudi Arabia relations: Saudi Arabia has an embassy in Jakarta, while Indonesia has an embassy in Riyadh and a consulate general in Jeddah.; Both countries are the member of Organisation of Islamic Cooperation and G-20 major economies.; Indonesia sent the largest hajj pilgrims among Muslim-majority countries.; The balance of trade is heavily in favour of Saudi Arabia, because of its oil and gas exports to Indonesia.; Migrant worker abuse and death sentences faced by Indonesian workers in Saudi Arabia are the main problems that strained diplomatic relations between two countries.
Sri Lanka	6 August 1952	See Indonesia–Sri Lanka relations: Indonesia and Sri Lanka are founders of the Non-Aligned Movement.; Since the diplomatic relations were established in 1952, both countries enjoys cordial and friendly relationship; Indonesia has an embassy in Colombo, while Sri Lanka has an embassy in Jakarta.; Both countries are also members of the Group of 77 and the Indian-Ocean Rim Association.
Syria	1949	See Indonesia–Syria relations: Both countries established diplomatic relations in 1949.; Syria has an embassy in Jakarta.; Indonesia has an embassy in Damascus.; In 2019, around 12,904 Indonesians reside in Syria.; Both nations are members of Non-Aligned Movement and the Group of 77.
Taiwan	Informal relations	See Indonesia–Taiwan relations: Indonesia and Taiwan (ROC) do not have diplomatic relations, both have only an unofficial relationship.; Despite geopolitical constraints, the relations between two countries remain flourished over times, the opportunities for widening and deepening the relations have grown.; In 2020, around 300,000 Indonesians reside in Taiwan.; Indonesia has an Economic and Trade Office in Taipei.; Taiwan has an Economic and Trade Office in Jakarta.
Turkey	1950	See Indonesia–Turkey relations: Indonesia has an embassy in Ankara and a consulate general in Istanbul.; Turkey has an embassy in Jakarta.; Both countries are members of D-8, G20, MIKTA, OIC and WTO.; Trade volume between the two countries was US$1.85 billion in 2019 (Indonesian exports/imports: 1.64/0.21 billion USD.; 2,400 Indonesian citizens reside in Turkey.
United Arab Emirates	1976	See Indonesia–United Arab Emirates relations: The diplomatic relations between Indonesia and the United Arab Emirates are important because both share the solidarity as Muslim-majority countries, and both countries recognize the important role of each counterparts in the region.; Since the diplomatic relations established in 1976, both country enjoy friendly and cordial relationship.; Indonesia has an embassy in Abu Dhabi, while the United Arab Emirates has an embassy in Jakarta.; Both countries are partners in multilateral organisations, such as the World Trade Organization (WTO), Non-Aligned Movement and Organisation of Islamic Cooperation (OIC).; Indonesia uses the UAE as the main gate to enter the Gulf and Middle East market, Indonesia's export to UAE is the largest in the Middle East.; The Indonesian government has established the trade and investment representative office to promote its products in the United Arab Emirates and the entire Middle East region.
Uzbekistan	23 June 1992	See Indonesia–Uzbekistan relations: On 28 December 1991, Indonesia has recognized the independence of the Republic of Uzbekistan from the dissolved Soviet Union.; Uzbekistan realized the strategic importance of Indonesia, home to the world's biggest Muslim population and Southeast Asia's biggest economy.; Indonesia recognizes Uzbekistan's strategic importance as the gate to Central Asia, a growing economy and a potential market.; Indonesia has an embassy in Tashkent.; Uzbekistan has an embassy in Jakarta.; Both nations are members of the Organisation of Islamic Cooperation and the Non-Aligned Movement.
Yemen	21 April 1962	See Indonesia–Yemen relations: Both countries share similarities as Muslim majority countries. They have multiple cultural proximities and similar view on international issues and these nations are members of the Non-Aligned Movement and Organisation of Islamic Cooperation.; Islam came to Indonesia through Yemeni merchants, the indigenous ruled by Hindu kings converted by seeing the modest of Yemenis, Islam spread through trade in the Nusantara archipelago.; Indonesia is represented in Yemen through its embassy in Muscat, Oman.; Yemen has an embassy in Jakarta.

=== Europe ===
Country	Formal Relations Began	Notes
Armenia	22 September 1992	See Armenia–Indonesia relations: Both countries established diplomatic relations on 22 September 1992.; Armenia has an embassy in Jakarta.; Indonesia has a non-resident ambassador in Kyiv, Ukraine also accredited to Armenia, and an honorary consulate in Yerevan.
Austria	1954	See Austria–Indonesia relations: Bilateral relations between Austria and Indonesia were officially established in 1954.; Austria recognises Indonesia as a stable and reliable partner, and both countries enjoy excellent relations.; The two countries have agreed to expand relations in business, trade and investment, tourism, culture, environment and green technology.; Austria has an embassy in Jakarta, while Indonesia has an embassy in Vienna that is also accredited to Slovenia as well as the following multilateral organisations: IAEA, PrepCom CTBTO, UNODC and UNOOSA.
Azerbaijan	24 September 1992	See Azerbaijan–Indonesia relations: On 28 September 1991, the Republic of Indonesia recognized the independence of the Republic of Azerbaijan.; On 24 September 1992, diplomatic relations were established between the Republic of Azerbaijan and the Republic of Indonesia.; Azerbaijan has an embassy in Jakarta.; Indonesia has an embassy in Baku.
Belgium	1949	See Belgium-Indonesia relations: Both countries established diplomatic relations in 1949 as Belgium was among the first European nations that recognized Indonesia.; Belgium has an embassy in Jakarta.; Indonesia has an embassy in Brussels, also accredited to Luxembourg and the EU.
Bosnia and Herzegovina	11 April 1994	See Bosnia and Herzegovina–Indonesia relations: Indonesian support for Bosnia and Herzegovina ranged from collecting donations, sending peacekeeping forces under United Nations, to building the Istiqlal Mosque in Sarajevo.; Bosnia and Herzegovina has an embassy in Jakarta; Indonesia has an embassy in Sarajevo
Bulgaria	20 September 1956	See Bulgaria–Indonesia relations: Diplomatic relations started on 20 September 1956.; Bulgaria has had an embassy in Jakarta since October 1958; Indonesia has had an embassy in Sofia Since 1960.
Croatia	3 September 1992	See Croatia-Indonesia relations: Croatia sees Indonesia as one of the largest and the most influential nation in ASEAN, and recognized its potential as the gate to enter ASEAN markets. Vice versa, Indonesia also recognizes Croatian potential as a strategic gate to penetrate Balkans and European Union market.; Croatia has embassy in Jakarta.; Indonesia has embassy in Zagreb.; Croatian Ministry of Foreign Affairs and European Integration: list of bilateral treaties with Indonesia
Cyprus	15 December 1987	See Cyprus–Indonesia relations: Diplomatic relations were established on 15 December 1987; Cyprus reopened its embassy in Jakarta in October 2023.; Indonesia is represented in Cyprus through its embassy in Rome, Italy.
Czechia	1950	See Czechia–Indonesia relations: Both countries established diplomatic relations in 1950.; Czechia has an embassy in Jakarta that is also accredited to Brunei, East Timor, Singapore and ASEAN, and honorary consulates in Denpasar, Makassar and Surabaya.; Indonesia has an embassy in Prague.
Denmark	15 February 1950	See Denmark–Indonesia relations: Denmark has an embassy in Jakarta.; Indonesia has an embassy in Copenhagen.
Finland	6 September 1954	See Finland-Indonesia relations: Finland recognised the independence of Indonesia on February 10, 1950.; Finland has an embassy in Jakarta and honorary consulates in Denpasar and Medan.; Indonesia has embassy in Helsinki.; Indonesia and Finland enjoy friendly relations.; Finland played a key role in the peace talks to solve the insurgency in Aceh.
France	2 August 1950	See France–Indonesia relations: Indonesia has an embassy in Paris.; France has an embassy in Jakarta.; Relations between France and Indonesia have been improving of late, while Indonesia has become increasingly strategic to the government and people of France.; There are 110 French multinational companies operating in Indonesia.; The relations between two countries are important as both are democratic republics and both have significant geopolitical influence in their regions.; The diplomatic relationship between France and Indonesia is also a key element for developing relations between Indonesia and the European Union and between France and ASEAN.; Both countries are the member of G-20 major economies.
Georgia	25 January 1993	See Georgia–Indonesia relations: Both countries established diplomatic relations on 25 January 1993.; Georgia has an embassy in Jakarta.; Indonesia has an embassy extension office in Tbilisi, subordinate to its embassy in Kyiv.
Germany	25 June 1952	See Germany–Indonesia relations: Indonesia and Germany have traditionally enjoyed good, intensive and wide-ranging relations.; Germany and Indonesia, as the largest members of the European Union and the Association of Southeast Asian Nations (ASEAN), respectively, take similar positions on a number of issues relating to the development of the two regional organisations.; Indonesia has an embassy in Berlin.; Germany has an embassy in Jakarta.
Greece	27 December 1949	See Greece–Indonesia relations: Diplomatic relations started on 27 December 1949; Indonesia has an embassy in Athens which was opened in 1994.; Greece has an embassy in Jakarta which was opened in 1997.; Greek Foreign Affairs Ministry about relations with Indonesia.
Holy See (Vatican City)	13 March 1950	See Holy See–Indonesia relations: Indonesia, the world's largest Muslim-majority country in terms of population, recognises Catholicism as one of its six approved religions.; The Holy See has an Apostolic Nunciature in Jakarta, while Indonesia has an embassy in Rome.; The Holy See recognised the Republic of Indonesia on 16 March 1950; Official relations were established in 1950 with the status of Apostolic Internunciatur. In December 1965, the status changed to Nunciatur Apostolic.; There have been two papal visits to Indonesia: those of Pope Paul VI in December 1970, and of Pope John Paul II in October 1989.; From 3 to 6 September 2024, Pope Francis visited Indonesia.
Hungary	1955	See Hungary–Indonesia relations: Diplomatic relations started in 1955.; Indonesia has an embassy in Budapest which was opened in 1960.; Hungary has an embassy in Jakarta which was opened in 1957, as well as honorary consuls in Bandung and Denpasar.
Iceland	13 June 1983	See Iceland–Indonesia relations: Both countries established diplomatic relations in 1983.; Iceland has a non-resident embassy in Tokyo.; Indonesia is represented in Iceland by its embassy in Oslo and an honorary consulate in Reykjavík.
Ireland	4 September 1984	See Indonesia–Ireland relations: Ireland has an embassy in Jakarta.; Indonesia is represented in Ireland through its embassy in London and an honorary consulate in Dublin.
Italy	29 December 1949	See Indonesia–Italy relations: Both countries have shown a strong desire to improve their relations, especially in intercultural understanding and trade.; Indonesia recognises Italy's strategic location and important role in the Mediterranean region, while Italy has favoured relations with Indonesia, and sees Indonesia as the leader in Southeast Asia.; The relations between two countries not only important to bridge the two regional communities; European Union and ASEAN, but also vital as intercultural and interfaith dialogue, Indonesia has an embassy in Rome.; Italy has an embassy in Jakarta.
Kosovo	No formal diplomatic relations	See Indonesia's reaction to the 2008 Kosovo declaration of independence Indonesia's reaction to Kosovo's independence has been mixed. Indonesia does not recognize Kosovo's membership in some international organizations, including the World Bank.
Monaco	17 December 2010	See Indonesia–Monaco relations: Due to the resemblance of the colors red and white on their flags, the Monégasque government asked Indonesia to modify its flag during the International Hydrographic Congress on 29 April 1952.; Indonesia has a non-resident embassy in Paris.; Monaco maintains an honorary consulate in Jakarta.
Netherlands	October 1949	See Indonesia–Netherlands relations: The Netherlands is the former colonial power, and handed over sovereignty in 1949.; Indonesia has an embassy in The Hague.; The Netherlands has an embassy in Jakarta.
Norway	25 January 1950	See Indonesia-Norway relations: Both countries have agreed to establish a strategic partnership against poverty and climate change, and also in promoting democracy and tolerance.; Norway has an embassy in Jakarta.; Indonesia has an embassy in Oslo.
Poland	19 September 1955	See Indonesia-Poland relations: Both countries established diplomatic relations on 19 September 1955.; Poland has an embassy in Jakarta.; Indonesia has an embassy in Warsaw.
Portugal	4 January 1965	See Indonesia–Portugal relations In 1999, Indonesia and Portugal restored diplomatic relations, which were broken off following the Indonesian invasion of East Timor in 1975.: Indonesia has an embassy in Lisbon.; Portugal has an embassy in Jakarta.
Romania	20 February 1950	See Indonesia-Romania relations: Indonesia has an embassy in Bucharest.; Romania has an embassy in Jakarta.
Russia	February 1950	See Indonesia–Russia relations: Russia has an embassy in Jakarta.; Indonesia has an embassy in Moscow along with an honorary consulate in Saint Petersburg.; Both countries are also members of the G20 and APEC.; Early in the Cold War, both countries had strong relations with Indonesian president Sukarno visiting Moscow and Soviet leader Nikita Khrushchev visiting Jakarta. When Sukarno was overthrown by General Suharto, relations between the two states were not as close as they were during Sukarno's times.; In late 2007, Indonesia purchased military weapons from Russia with long term payment.
Serbia	1954	See Indonesia–Serbia relations Serbia has close relations with Indonesia, especially within the fields of trade, culture and tourism. Indonesia has also voiced support for Serbia's territorial integrity over the Kosovo issue.
Slovakia	1 January 1993	Because of their long-standing cordial and cordial ties dating back to President Sukarno's administration, Indonesia was among the first nations to recognize the independence of the Slovak Republic.; Both countries formally established their embassies in their respective capital cities, Jakarta and Bratislava, in 1995.
Spain	February 1958	See Indonesia–Spain relations: Spain identifies Indonesia as a natural ally and has named Indonesia as one of their priority countries in their foreign relations with the Asian region.; Indonesia supports Spain in the Gibraltar issue.; Indonesia has an embassy in Madrid and consulates in Barcelona and Las Palmas, while Spain has an embassy in Jakarta and a consulate in Denpasar, Bali.; Cooperation has expanded to various fields, from trade and culture to education and the defence technology sector.; Since the 1980s, Spain and Indonesia have embarked on a strategic partnership in aeronautics technology. Spain's CASA and Indonesia's IPTN (formerly known as Nurtanio) co-designed and co-produced the CASA/IPTN CN-235 medium transport aircraft.
Sweden	1960	See Indonesia–Sweden relations: Sweden has actively contributed in Aceh peace process and gave assistance to the tsunami reconstruction.; Indonesia has an embassy in Stockholm.; Sweden has an embassy in Jakarta.
Switzerland	2 November 1951	See Indonesia–Switzerland relations: In 2010, the heads of state of the two countries agreed to launch negotiations on a Comprehensive Economic Partnership Agreement.; Switzerland has named Indonesia as one of seven priority countries for economic development co-operation.; Indonesia has an embassy in Bern, while Switzerland has an embassy in Jakarta, also accredited for East Timor and ASEAN.; On 6 December 1973, the Indonesian and Swiss governments signed an agreement to establish Polytechnic for Mechanics within the Bandung Institute of Technology at Bandung. Today, the Swiss Mechanics Polytechnic has transformed into Bandung State Polytechnic for Manufacture.
Ukraine	11 June 1992	See Indonesia-Ukraine relations Joko Widodo meeting with Ukrainian president Volodymyr Zelenskyy in Kyiv on 29 June 2022: Indonesia recognised Ukraine's independence on 28 December 1991 and established diplomatic relations on 11 June 1992.; In 2011, the total trade volume between two nations has reached US$1.27 billion, and increased to US$1.32 billion in 2012. The trade balances between two nations is in favour to Ukraine; the Indonesian export value to Ukraine in 2012 was US$548.9 million, while Indonesia's import value from Ukraine for the same year was US$774.1 million.; During the Russian invasion of Ukraine, the Indonesian government provided additional aid to Ukraine through the Ukrainian Red Cross and expressed its commitment to assisting in reconstructing war-damaged hospitals.; Indonesia has an embassy in Kyiv.; Ukraine has an embassy in Jakarta.
United Kingdom	1949	See Indonesia–United Kingdom relations British Prime Minister Keir Starmer with Indonesian President Prabowo Subianto in Downing Street, November 2024. Indonesia established diplomatic relations with the United Kingdom on 19 December 1949.: Indonesia maintains an embassy in London.; The United Kingdom is accredited to Indonesia through its embassy in Jakarta, as well as an honorary consulate in Bali.; The United Kingdom occupied Indonesia from 1811 to 1816 and 1945 to 1946, on both occasions Indonesia was transferred to the Netherlands. Both countries share common membership of the G20, and the World Trade Organization. Bilaterally the two countries have a Development Partnership, a Double Taxation Agreement, an Investment Agreement, and a Strategic Partnership. The Culture and Tourism Ministry of Indonesia launched a campaign to boost the number of tourists from the UK entering Indonesia. In 2009, 160,000 British tourists visited Indonesia, the aim of the campaign was to boost this number to 200,000. In 2006 former British prime-minister Tony Blair met with Susilo Bambang Yudhoyono where they agreed upon "the establishment of a regular Indonesia-UK Partnership Forum to be chaired by the Foreign Ministers, to promote strategic dialogue on bilateral, multilateral and global issues". The first Indonesia-UK forum was held in 2007 and was chaired by British foreign minister Margaret Beckett and Indonesian foreign minister Hassan Wirajuda. In March 2010 members of the House of Lords praised Indonesia for its progress in democratising society, media freedom and environmental protection. In a meeting with Indonesian MP Hayono Isman, the Lords stated that they wanted to improve the relationship between the two countries.

=== Oceania ===
Country	Formal Relations Began	Notes
Australia	27 December 1949	See Australia–Indonesia relations Since Indonesian independence, the two countries have maintained mutual diplomatic relations, formalised co-operation (especially in the fields of fisheries conservation, law enforcement, and justice co-operation), a measure of security co-operation, broadening treaty relationships, co-membership of regional forums, and co-participation in several multilateral Treaties of significance. Trade between the two countries has grown over the years. Recent years have seen a deepening of Australia's aid commitment to Indonesia, and Australia has become a popular venue for Indonesian students. In 2008–09, Indonesia is the largest recipient of Australian aid at a value of AUD462 million. Indonesia has an embassy in Canberra and consulates general in Melbourne, Perth and Sydney, While Australia has an embassy in Jakarta and consulates in Medan, Makassar, Surabaya and Denpasar.
Fiji	1974	See Indonesia–Fiji relations: Fiji has an embassy in Jakarta.; Indonesia has an embassy in Suva.
New Zealand	28 June 1958	See Indonesia–New Zealand relations Having common interests as democracies and neighbours in the Asia-Pacific region, New Zealand and Indonesia are viewed as natural partners. Both countries are members of APEC. Indonesia and New Zealand officially established diplomatic relations in 1958, the diplomatic and economic ties have grown stronger ever since. New Zealand has an embassy in Jakarta and Indonesia has an embassy in Wellington. Indonesia's commodity exports to New Zealand consist mainly of energy products and minerals as well as lumber and agriculture, while New Zealand's commodity exports to Indonesia mainly consist of dairy products and meats, such as beef, milk, and cheese.
Cook Islands and Niue (States in free association within New Zealand)	12 July 2019	See Political status of the Cook Islands and Niue Indonesia established diplomatic relations with both the Cook Islands and Niue on 12 July 2019 as a move to strengthen its ties with the Pacific Islands region.
Palau	6 July 2007	Both countries established diplomatic relations on 6 July 2007.; Indonesia shares a maritime border with Palau.; Both countries represent each other through their respective embassies in Manila, Philippines.
Papua New Guinea	16 September 1975	See Indonesia–Papua New Guinea relations Indonesia shares a 760-kilometre (470 mi) border with Papua New Guinea through its Papua, Highland Papua and South Papua provinces. The common border has raised tensions and ongoing diplomatic issues over multiple decades.: Indonesia has an embassy Port Moresby and a consulate in Vanimo.; Papua New Guinea has an embassy in Jakarta and a consulate general in Jayapura.
Solomon Islands	28 July 1983	See Indonesia–Solomon Islands relations: Bilateral relations severed in 2016 as during the United Nations General Assembly of said year, Solomon Islands Prime Minister Manasseh Sogavare alleged the human rights violations in the Indonesian provinces of Papua and West Papua, and also push for the independence of the said provinces.; Indonesia has a non-resident embassy in Port Moresby.; The Solomon Islands has an embassy in Jakarta.
Vanuatu	3 July 1995	See Indonesia–Vanuatu relations: Both countries established diplomatic relations on 3 July 1995.; Bilateral relations have historically been strained due to Vanuatu's support for the Free Papua Movement.; Indonesia is represented in Vanuatu through its embassy in Canberra, Australia. However, Vanuatu suggested that an Indonesian embassy in Port Vila should be kept apart from the one in Canberra.; Vanuatu has announced plans to open an embassy in Jakarta.

== International organization participation ==
- ADB
- AIIB
- APEC
- ASEAN
- BRICS
- CP
- CTBTO
- D-8
- EAS
- ESCAP
- FAO
- FATF
- FEALAC
- G15
- G20
- G20 developing nations
- G77
- IAEA
- IBRD
- ICAO
- ICC
- IDA
- IDB
- IFAD
- IFC
- ILO
- IMF
- IMO
- Interpol
- IOC
- IORA
- IPC
- IPEF
- IPU
- ISA
- ISO
- ITSO
- ITU
- ITUC
- MIGA
- NAM
- OIC
- OPCW
- OPEC Fund
- UN
- UNCTAD
- UNESCO
- UNIDO
- UNIDROIT
- UNWTO
- UPU
- WCO
- WFTU
- WHO
- WIPO
- WMO
- WTO

== See also ==
- Indonesia–United States relations
- Australia–Indonesia relations
- Indonesia–Netherlands relations
- Indonesia–Malaysia relations
- Indonesia–Singapore relations
- Indonesia–Russia relations
- China–Indonesia relations
- Indonesia–Japan relations
- Indonesia–Saudi Arabia relations
- European Union–Indonesia relations
- List of diplomatic missions in Indonesia
- List of diplomatic missions of Indonesia
- List of diplomatic missions in Jakarta
- List of Indonesian Ambassadors to Australia
- List of Indonesian Ambassadors to the United Kingdom
