= Indonesia–Mozambique relations =

- Indonesia: Mozambique

Indonesia–Mozambique relations are the bilateral relations between Indonesia and Mozambique. Both countries are members of the Non-Aligned Movement, Organization of Islamic Cooperation and the Indian-Ocean Rim Association.

== History ==
Indonesia and Mozambique established diplomatic relations on 4 October 1991. Periodically, there has been a noticeable improvement in the bilateral ties between the two nations, shown by a rise in the number of bilateral visits between businesspeople and government representatives from the two nations. Numerous memorandums of understanding have been signed between the two nations in the areas of trade, business, law enforcement, small and medium-sized enterprises (SMEs), science and technology, women's empowerment, and sister cities between Jakarta and Maputo.

In August 2019, the two nations signed a Preferential Trade Agreement, which came into effect in 2022. The purpose of the PTA is to lower tariffs on hundreds of goods to increase the amount of trade between the two nations.

From the 22nd to the 23rd of August 2023, Indonesian President Joko Widodo visited Maputo and held bilateral talks with Mozambican President Filipe Nyusi. As Jokowi regards Mozambique as a close friend and the country's first PTA partner in Africa, he has reaffirmed Indonesia's commitment to fortify partnership with Mozambique through cooperation in the economic and development sectors and optimize the Preferential Trade Agreement.

== Trade ==
Since 2011, Indonesia has provided technical support to Mozambique by promoting participation in capacity-building training in Mozambique and training in Indonesia pertaining to the oil and gas, textile, and agricultural sectors. Even still, commerce between the two countries is still very low; in 2013, Indonesia sent items to Mozambique valued US$92.358 million, while US$49.07 million was imported. whereas US$49.07 million was imported.

Nonetheless, in 2013, the value of trade between the two nations remained very minor, with US$49.07 million in imports and US$92.358 million in exports from Indonesia to Mozambique. Based on the value of Mozambique's foreign trade volume, which was US$6.2 billion, the US$141,425 in trade volume between the two nations is very tiny at 0.2% and has room to grow.

== Diplomatic missions ==
- Indonesia maintains an embassy in Maputo, also accredited to Malawi.
- Mozambique maintains an embassy in Jakarta, also accredited to Malaysia, the Philippines, Singapore, Thailand and Timor-Leste.

== See also ==
- Foreign relations of Indonesia
- Foreign relations of Mozambique
- Indonesia–Mozambique Preferential Trade Agreement
