= Indonesia–Iraq relations =

- Indonesia: Iraq

Diplomatic mission
- Embassy of Indonesia in Baghdad, Iraq: Embassy of Iraq in Jakarta, Indonesia

Envoy
- Indonesian Ambassador to Iraq Didik Eko Pujianto: Iraq Ambassador to Indonesia Ali Taha

Indonesia and Iraq established diplomatic relations on 27 February 1950 when President Sukarno appointed Bagindo Dahlan Abdullah, a member of the Central Indonesia National Committee, to serve as the ambassador of the United States of Indonesia to Iraq, Syria, Lebanon, and Jordan with a permanent residence in Baghdad. The relationship between the two countries is marked by the establishment of the Indonesian embassy in Baghdad and the Iraqi embassy in Jakarta. Both countries share similar views on foreign policy issues, particularly as members of several international organizations, including the Non-Aligned Movement, Organization of Islamic Cooperation (OIC), Group of 77 (G 77) and the United Nations.

== History ==
=== Before Indonesian Independence ===
Relations were commenced centuries ago. Ancient Iraq and the Indonesian archipelago were connected through the maritime Silk Road of the Indian Ocean trade, where goods and ideas travel. The Srivijaya empire back established contacts with Islamic Caliphate in the Middle East during the 8th century. In the 13th century, Islam arrived in Indonesia, and it slowly became the majority religion in the archipelago since the 16th century.

Islam became the link between the two countries, as numbers of traders and ulamas spread the religion to the Indonesian archipelago. Numbers of Arabic books and literatures travel through trade links and ports, until finally reaching Indonesia. The Arabian Nights tales has caught the imaginations of Indonesians, popular ever since the antiquities of Indonesian sultanates and kingdoms.

=== After Indonesian Independence ===
After World War II, Iraq became one of the first countries to recognize Indonesia's de jure independence in 1947. Since 1950, the two countries have established official relations with the opening of embassies in both countries. In 1960, President Sukarno visited Iraq. The visit aimed to strengthen bilateral relations in the political and economic spheres. Indonesia maintained its embassy in Baghdad during various crises, such as the Iran-Iraq War in the 1980s.

In 1995, Iraqi Vice President Taha Yasin Ramadhan visited Indonesia and met with Vice President Try Sutrisno and President Suharto. This visit aimed to rebuild relations between the two countries after the Gulf War. During the visit, Iraq asked Indonesia to support its country in international forums, particularly the UN and the Organization of Islamic Cooperation (OIC). Iraq needed Indonesia's support, as Indonesia served as chairman of the Non-Aligned Movement from 1992 to 1995.

In 2003, the Indonesian government and people did not support a U.S.-led military campaign against Iraq. Over 50,000 Indonesian people crowded the streets of the Indonesian capital, Jakarta on Sunday, 9 February 2003, to protest the US' threat of military action against Iraq. At the height of the Iraq War, Indonesia temporarily closed its embassy in Baghdad in 2003. Because of the gradually improving security situation in Iraq, Indonesia reopened its embassy in June 2011. Since then, relations between the two countries have developed at a fast pace. Both nations are in the process of reviving their bilateral relations, which were stalled due to the war in Iraq.

== Economy and trade ==
Traditionally, Indonesia sees Iraq as the source of energy, such as oil and gas. On the other hand, Iraqis are familiar with Indonesian exported products such as tires, soaps, spices, and other daily-use products.

Iraq, the second-largest oil producer in the Organization of Petroleum Exporting Countries (OPEC), is aiming to increase its bilateral trade with Indonesia to US$1 billion in 2013 via a recently signed oil sale and purchase agreement and increasing its non-oil and gas imports direct from Jakarta.

Indonesia's bilateral trade value with Iraq increased to US$154 million in 2011, from US$52 million in 2010. However, the value decreased in 2012. According to Indonesia's Central Statistics Agency (BPS), the value of bilateral trade in 2012 was just $45 million. Both countries signed a memorandum of understanding in March 2013 during a visit by Coordinating Economic Minister Hatta Rajasa to Iraq. Under the agreement, Iraq will supply 35,000 barrels per day (bpd) of oil starting from May 2013.

== Refugees and migration ==
After the 2003 invasion, Iraq fell into a civil war and the country become volatile as violence engulfed the country. Iraq is included in Indonesia's immigration red list. Many countries, including Indonesia, still consider Iraq a dangerous place, and a number of Iraqi citizens illegally enter Indonesian territory each year in their attempts to reach Australia. Because of security reasons, Iraq is among 13 countries whose citizens are required to provide specific documents to enter Indonesia.

== See also ==
- Foreign relations of Indonesia
- Foreign relations of Iraq
