= Indonesia–Senegal relations =

- Indonesia: Senegal

Indonesia–Senegal relations were officially established on October 3, 1980. Indonesia recognizes Senegal's potential as its entrance to penetrate the West African market. Indonesian government opened its embassy in Dakar since 1982, while Senegal embassy in Kuala Lumpur is also accredited to Indonesia. Both countries are members of the Non-Aligned Movement.

== History ==
During colonial rule, both Léopold Sédar Senghor and Mohammad Hatta participated in the February 1927 Congress against Colonial Oppression and Imperialism, held in Brussels. This conference has been described as the 'intellectual father' of the Bandung Conference. Senghor would later describe the 1955 Bandung Conference was 'the most important event since the Renaissance'. Indonesian President Sukarno paid an official visit to Senegal (then still not independent) in 1959.

In December 2019, Indonesian foreign minister, Retno Marsudi, met Senegalese president Macky Sall in Dakar. The two sides discussed economic and infrastructure cooperation, including the supply of Indonesian-built aircraft, construction projects and possible cooperation in the phosphate-mining sector.

== Trade ==
In October 31 to November 1, 2013, Indonesia has launched trade mission to Senegal and Gambia to promote Indonesian products. At least US$700 thousand trade deal was recorded during this trade mission. Senegal intends to buy two CN-235-220 planes from state aircraft manufacturer PT Dirgantara Indonesia. The bilateral trade volume between the two countries reached US$46.1 million in 2012, with trade balance heavily in favour to Indonesia with exports to Senegal valued at US$43 million. Indonesian exports to Senegal includes animal and vegetable oils, machinery, chemicals, garments and utensils.

== Cooperation ==
Indonesia has expressed their commitment to increase the cooperation with Senegal in economic and trade, technical and agricultural sector. Other sectors that potential to be developed are infrastructures, industry, healthcare, and culture.

== See also ==
- Foreign relations of Indonesia
- Foreign relations of Senegal
