= Indonesia–Nepal relations =

- Indonesia: Nepal

Indonesia and Nepal established diplomatic relations in 1960. Until now, there are no permanent ambassadors between the two countries. Indonesia established an honorary consulate in Kathmandu, while its embassy in Dhaka, Bangladesh, is also accredited to Nepal. Nepal has accredited its embassy in Kuala Lumpur, Malaysia, also to Indonesia. Both nations are partners and founding members of the Non-Aligned Movement (NAM).

== History ==
Nepal and Indonesia established diplomatic relations on 25 December 1960. Indonesia had opened its embassy in Kathmandu in 1965 which was closed in 1967, citing their adherence to austerity measures. In April 2010, Indonesia opened its honorary consulate in Kathmandu. The Embassy of the Republic of Indonesia in Dhaka is accredited to Nepal whereas the Nepalese Embassy in Kuala Lumpur is accredited to Indonesia.

Both Nepal and Indonesia are founding member of NAM. Nepal was a participant in Bandung Conference of 1955 which paved the way for formation of NAM. Long-standing relations between Nepal and Indonesia date back to the time of the Afro-Asian Conference in Bandung in 1955.

== Stately visits ==
Mochtar Kusumaatadja, Foreign Minister of Indonesia, visited Nepal in 1981 to attend the coronation of King Birendra Bir Bikram Shah Dev representing the President of Indonesia. Prime Minister Girija Prasad Koirala visited Indonesia in 1992 to attend the 10th NAM summit. The then King Gyanendra and Queen Komal visited Indonesia on April 20–23, 2005, to attend the Asian-African Summit in Jakarta. Deputy Prime Minister and Minister for Foreign Affairs Narayan Kaji Shreshta 'Prakash' visited Indonesia from 6 to 10 November 2012 to participate in the Bali Democracy Forum V, 2012.

== Culture and education ==
Indonesia has been providing scholarship to Nepalese student in various fields. Due to the similarity of culture and tourist interest, Indonesia proposes for a sister city relation between Bali and Kathmandu, and that they would be happy to share the large inflow of tourists visiting Bali with Kathmandu once there is direct airlink between the two countries.

== Economy and trade ==
The figure of trade volume between the two countries reached US$14 million, which is heavily in favor of Indonesia. From Indonesia, Nepal mainly imports food product such as fruits, nuts and palm oil, also paper and paper board, and chemical. The two countries have potential that is yet to be explored, especially in trade and tourism sectors, also social and cultural exchanges.

== Resident diplomatic missions ==
- Indonesia is accredited to Nepal from its embassy in Dhaka, Bangladesh.
- Nepal is accredited to Indonesia from its embassy in Kuala Lumpur, Malaysia.

== See also ==
- Foreign relations of Indonesia
- Foreign relations of Nepal
