= Indonesia–Oman relations =

Bilateral relations

- Indonesia: Oman

Indonesia–Oman relations was officially established on 5 December 1977. Indonesia and Oman are Muslim majority countries and shares same commitment in pursuing global peace and prosperity. Indonesia has an embassy in Muscat, while Oman has an embassy in Jakarta. Both countries are members of Organization of Islamic Cooperation and also Non Aligned Movement.

== History ==
Circa 13th century, the Arab traders from Hadramawt and Oman has embarked to trade with the east; with India, Indonesian archipelago, as far as China. They have played a significant role in introducing Islam to Indonesia. The bilateral diplomatic relations between Indonesia and Oman was officially established in 1978, however it was not until 2011 that Indonesia and Oman established their embassies in each counterparts.

On June 17–18, 2000, Indonesian President Abdurrahman Wahid paid a state visit to Oman.

== Trade ==
Indonesia sees Oman as a new potential market, while Oman sees Indonesia's central position in ASEAN. Numbers of Oman businessmen visited Indonesia in August 2013 to explore trade opportunities. According to Indonesian Ministry of Trade, the bilateral trade volume in 2008 reached US$166.45 million, and rose to US$464.03 million in 2012, which was a 279.5% increase. The bilateral trade balance in 2012 recorded US$11.66 million surplus for Indonesia.

Indonesian export commodities to Oman include wood and wood products, electrical appliances, paper and paperboard, iron, textiles, man-made staple fibers, furniture and foodstuff. While Indonesian imports from Oman are products of mill industry, mineral fuels and inorganic chemicals.

== Migrant workers ==
Currently there are around 80 thousand Indonesian migrant workers in Oman, and mostly are treated well. There are no reports of abuses or any problems to date. Oman also asked Indonesia to send more skilled labor to fulfill Oman's human resources need, cited that today most of Indonesian workers there was low-skilled labors that works in domestic sectors.

== See also ==
- Foreign relations of Indonesia
- Foreign relations of Oman
