= Georgia–Indonesia relations =

- Georgia: Indonesia

Diplomatic mission
- Georgian Embassy, Jakarta: Indonesian Embassy in Kyiv

Georgia–Indonesia relations are the bilateral relations between Georgia and Indonesia. Georgia recognizes Indonesia as a key political, economic, and cultural partner in Southeast Asia. Both nations are members of the Asian Development Bank, the World Trade Organization and the United Nations.

== History ==
Diplomatic relations between Indonesia and Georgia were established on 25 January 1993, two years following the latter's independence from the Soviet Union. Since then, strong diplomatic ties that have been fostered have greatly aided in the success of both nations. Georgia and Indonesia have established a strong and enduring partnership through their shared interests in a variety of sectors, including tourism, economy, and other fields.

In 2018, during the 100th anniversary celebration of Georgian independence at its embassy in Jakarta, optimism was voiced over the potential for closer relations between the two nations.

In charge of Indonesia's relations with Georgia is the Indonesian embassy in Kyiv, Ukraine. The former ambassador to Indonesia, Zorab Aleksidze, along with members of the parliament, Georgian government ministries, and agencies tasked with exploring opportunities for enhancing economic cooperation, attended a welcome event there in 2019 to commemorate 74 years of Indonesian independence. The Indonesian government had earlier decided to send a representative to Georgia in advance of the establishment of an official representation, as the deputy foreign minister for Georgia mentioned at this ceremony.

The Georgia-Indonesia Business Association was founded to serve as a conduit for business communication between Georgian and Indonesian business owners, as well as to assist in enhancing and growing trade, tourism, and investment between the two nations.

On 7 November 2025, Tornike Nozadze, the ambassador of Georgia to Indonesia, presented President Prabowo Subianto his credentials at a ceremony conducted at Jakarta's Merdeka Palace. They discussed the friendly relations and cooperation between their nations, expressing a commitment to strengthen collaboration in mutual interest areas.

On 28 April 2026, ambassador Nozadze stated during in an interview with Antara News that he praised the "excellent" bilateral ties between Georgia and Indonesia, emphasizing Indonesia's strategic importance in Southeast Asia and the expanding cooperation in trade, culture, and tourism. He emphasized over two decades of diplomatic relationships, shared principles like respect for sovereignty, and the untapped potential in economic relations. He also emphasized the significance of people-to-people contacts in enhancing bilateral relations.

On 26 May 2026, Indonesian Minister of Human Rights Natalius Pigai emphasized the importance of enhancing bilateral relations between Georgia and Indonesia, focusing on cooperation in human rights, tolerance, and social justice. He highlighted shared values like independence and mutual respect, and the need for constructive dialogue to tackle global challenges. Pigai noted the potential for growth in sectors such as trade, education, culture, and tourism, emphasizing the role of people-to-people exchanges in fostering understanding.

== Trade ==
Georgia exported $447k to Indonesia in 2021. Knit t-shirts ($105 thousand), medical instruments ($42.7 thousand) and polymer ion-exchangers ($108 thousand) are Georgia's top exports to Indonesia. Georgia's exports to Indonesia have dropped at a yearly rate of 2.07% during the past 24 years, from $739 thousand in 1997 to $447 thousand in 2021.

Indonesia sold $186 million to Georgia in 2021. Indonesia's top exports to Georgia were palm oil ($3.97 million), coffee ($23.2 million) and copper ore ($147 million). Indonesian exports to Georgia have grown at an annualized rate of 17.9% over the previous 24 years, from $3.59 million in 1997 to $186 million in 2021.

== Diplomatic missions ==
- Indonesia has an embassy extension office in Tbilisi, subordinate to its embassy in Kyiv.
- Georgia maintains an embassy in Jakarta.

== See also ==
- Foreign relations of Georgia
- Foreign relations of Indonesia
