= Finland–Indonesia relations =

- Finland: Indonesia

Diplomatic mission
- Embassy of Finland, Jakarta: Embassy of Indonesia, Helsinki

Finland and Indonesia established diplomatic relations in 1954. Finland has an embassy in Jakarta and honorary consulates in Denpasar and Surabaya, while Indonesia has an embassy in Helsinki.

== History ==
The historical relations between two nations has begun prior to the formation of Republic of Indonesia. Back on September 3, 1923, Finland established its honorary consul in Batavia (now Jakarta), Dutch East Indies, and formalized on March 31, 1927. Following the end of Indonesian National Revolution, on February 10, 1950, Finland recognized Indonesian sovereignty, and the two countries established diplomatic relations on September 6, 1954. From this time, the Finnish embassy in New Delhi was also appointed for Indonesia until May 1, 1974, when Finland finally opened its embassy in Jakarta. In 1976, Indonesia reciprocally established its own embassy in Helsinki.

In August 2005, Martti Ahtisaari of Finland helped to end 30 years of fighting between Acehanese rebels and the Indonesian government. He initiated and mediated a crisis management initiative that successfully led to a peace agreement signed in Helsinki followed seven months of negotiations.

== Cooperation ==
Finland and Indonesia has agreed to forge a partnership in energy and environment sector and also to promote cooperation and development for renewable and clean energy.

The partnership between Finland and Indonesia covers some sectors, including education, technology, renewable energy, environment, economy and trade.

== See also ==
- Foreign relations of Finland
- Foreign relations of Indonesia
