= Indonesia–Liberia relations =

- Indonesia: Liberia

Indonesia–Liberia relations were officially established in 1965; however, it was not until 2013 that the bilateral relations between Indonesia and Liberia started to intensify, signed with the visits of the two respective countries' leaders. The Indonesian embassy in Abuja is also accredited to Liberia, while the Liberian embassy in New Delhi is also accredited to Indonesia.

== History ==
The relations were pioneered by the participation of the Liberian delegation during the Asia-Africa Conference in Bandung back in 1955. The bilateral relations were officially established in 1965. After then the bilateral relations seemed to be neglected, until 2013, when Indonesian President Susilo Bambang Yudhoyono visited Monrovia from January 31 to February 2, 2013. Reciprocated by the state visit paid by Liberian president Ellen Johnson Sirleaf to Indonesia from March 24–27, 2013. Other than visiting Jakarta to strengthen bilateral relations, the Liberian president also visited Bali to attend the Fourth Session of the United Nations High Level Panel of Eminent Persons on the Post-2015 Development Agenda. These are the first visits of both countries' leaders to each of their counterparts.

== Cooperations ==
The cooperation is focused on development programs, especially through MDGs. Indonesia has agreed to assist Liberia through technical cooperation and capacity building in various sectors, especially in industry, agriculture, fishery, education, and human resource development. Both nations also have agreed to increase the trade promotion, and also technical support to increase rice productivity in Liberia.

== Trade ==
The bilateral trade volume between Indonesia and Liberia recorded a significant increase, from US$30.9 million in 2011 to 39.5 million in 2012.

== See also ==
- Foreign relations of Indonesia
- Foreign relations of Liberia
