= Ecuador–Indonesia relations =

- Ecuador: Indonesia

Ecuador–Indonesia relations refer to the bilateral relations between Ecuador and Indonesia. Relations were established on 29 April 1980; however, it was not until November 2004 that Ecuador established its embassy in Jakarta, and reciprocating 6 years later on November 11, 2010, that Indonesia finally opened its embassy in Quito. Both countries are the members of Forum of East Asia-Latin America Cooperation and the Non-Aligned Movement.

== History ==
From 22 to 23 June 2012, Indonesian President Susilo Bambang Yudhoyono visited Quito and meet his counterpart President Rafael Correa of Ecuador. They also witnessed the signing of several memorandums of understanding between two nations. The visit was also meant to reciprocate the Ecuadorian president's visit to Indonesia back in November 2007. The bilateral relations mainly in the energy sector, Ecuador has some oil and gas fields and offered Indonesia the opportunity to invest in the petroleum industry. In 2013 the bilateral trade volume reached US$94.54 million with trade balance in favour to Indonesia with US$68.30 million surplusses.

On 29 August 2022, Ecuador decided to improve bilateral cooperation with the 4th Bilateral Consultation Forum, which was conducted in-person in Jakarta. The Deputy Minister for Foreign Affairs of Ecuador, Ambassador Luis Vayas Valdivieso, led the Ecuadorian team, while Ambassador Ngurah Swajaya, the Director-General for American and European Affairs, led the Indonesian delegation. The two delegates expressed their appreciation for the strong bilateral ties that have persisted despite the COVID-19 pandemic, as evidenced by the rise in the value of bilateral trade, the reciprocal official visits between the two nations, and the signing of three agreements in the last two years pertaining to defense, counter-drug measures, and disaster risk management. The discussion covered topics of mutual interest on a regional and global scale, the advancement of ongoing collaborations, and the investigation of potential avenues for future cooperation in a variety of sectors.

== See also ==
- Foreign relations of Ecuador
- Foreign relations of Indonesia
