= Indonesia–Panama relations =

- Indonesia: Panama

Indonesia–Panama relations were established on 27 March 1979. Since the beginning, both countries have realized the strategic importance of each counterpart; Indonesia sees the strategic and geographic importance of Panama as their gate to Central America as well as to reach the Caribbean region, while Panama has also recognized the strategic importance of Indonesia in ASEAN. Indonesia has an embassy in Panama City, while Panama has an embassy in Jakarta.

During the 2019-2021 Persian Gulf crisis, Indonesia had seized Iranian and Panamanian tankers in Borneo. The two ships had suspected of illegally transferring oil in the waters.

== Trade and investment ==
Indonesia sees Panama as an attractive market with good prospect to grow in the future. Currently, Panama is Indonesia's fourth largest trading partner in Latin America after Brazil, Argentina and Chile. Panama Ministry of Trade and Industry has invited Indonesian business to invest and take the opportunity in the Colon Free Zone (CFZ) as the center of economic activity in Panama.

In 2011, the bilateral trade volume between Indonesia and Panama has reached US$218.7 million, a 45.1% increase compared to 2010 trade that booked US$150.7 million. Since 2007 to 2011, the bilateral trade shows increasing trend of average 33.7% increase annually. Indonesian main export to Panama are footwear, electronic parts, textile, and vehicle tire. While Indonesian imports from Panama mainly in shipping sector, such as passenger and cargo vessel, oil tanker, also ferrous waste and scrap.

== Culture ==
The Indonesian embassy in Panama City has promoted Indonesian culture to the Panamaian public in several occasions, such as diplomatic reception on 28 August 2013. This includes the demonstration of Balinese bridal wear, paintings and decorations, the traditional music of Bali, slides shows of photographs of Indonesian provinces as well as presentations of some Indonesian dishes . Indonesian traditional textiles, batik and ikat made its first appearance in Fashion Week Panama from October 10 to 12 in Atlapa Convention Centre. This event showcased 15 works of Panamaian fashion designer Isabel Chacín that inspired and applied Indonesian batik and ikat into her works. These efforts to introduce Indonesia are expected to strengthen diplomatic ties between Indonesia and Panama.

== See also ==
- Foreign relations of Indonesia
- Foreign relations of Panama
