= Indonesia–Tunisia relations =

- Indonesia: Tunisia

Indonesia and Tunisia established diplomatic relations in 1960. In early 2010s, relations are particularly important following the Arab Spring, as Tunisia seeks Indonesia as an example of democracy in a Muslim-majority country, while Indonesia has expressed its willingness to support the democratic transition in Tunisia through a capacity for building and a partnership in democracy. Indonesia has described Tunisia as a shining example of a democratic transition in the Arab World. The diplomatic relations dated back to the 1950s when Indonesia supports Tunisian independence from France. Indonesia has an embassy in Tunis, while Tunisia has an embassy in Jakarta. Both countries are members of the Organisation of Islamic Cooperation and the Non-Aligned Movement.

== History ==
The relations between Indonesia and Tunisia have been established early even before Tunisia achieved its independence from France in 1956. Tunisian freedom fighter Habib Bourguiba visited Jakarta in 1951, followed by the establishment of Tunisian independence representative office in the city in 1952 to lobby the Asian nations support for Tunisian independence. Diplomatic ties were established in 1960, and the two nations support each other in international forums, including the UN, OIC, and Non-Aligned Movement. Economic collaboration is facilitated through agreements such as a 1992 double taxation avoidance treaty, the Joint Study Group, and the Tunisia-Indonesia Business Association.

The 2010-2011 Arab Spring and Tunisia's democratic transition brought a fresh dimension to their relationship. Tunisia sought lessons from Indonesia's democratic experience, and Indonesia—through intergovernmental and civil society channels such as the Bali Democracy Forum and the Institute for Peace and Democracy (IPD)—engaged in capacity-building initiatives to support Tunisia’s democratic transition. These included dialogues, exchanges on election management, and training programs between 2012 and 2015. Indonesia described Tunisia as an important example of democratic transition in the Arab world and worked with Tunisian partners on democracy-related cooperation.

== Economic relations ==
The Indonesian Central Statistics Agency reported that in 2011 the trade volume reached US$100 million. The trade balance was heavily in favour to Indonesia with Indonesia's exports reaching US$84.77 million in 2010. Indonesia exports mainly consists of lubricant oil, musical instruments, optics, rubber, paper, plastics, furniture, shoes, coffee and spices to Tunisia, while the Southeast Asian country importing dates, oranges, fertilizers, rock phosphate, glass, plastics and olive oil from the North African country. In 2024, bilateral trade between Indonesia and Tunisia reached $175.1 million, with Indonesia holding a trade surplus of $56.6 million. Indonesian exports to Tunisia totaled $116 million, primarily driven by agricultural and industrial commodities such as palm oil ($39.2M), semi-finished iron ($24.2M), and coconut oil ($11.5M). Conversely, Tunisia exported $59.1 million worth of goods to Indonesia, led by tropical fruits ($17.1M), crustaceans ($14.9M), and utility meters ($4.82M). Over the 2019–2024 period, export values between the two nations expanded consistently, with Indonesian exports growing at an annualized rate of 13.3% and Tunisian exports to Indonesia growing at 9.09% annually.

== See also ==
- Foreign relations of Indonesia
- Foreign relations of Tunisia
