= Indonesia–Zimbabwe relations =

- Indonesia: Zimbabwe

Indonesia–Zimbabwe relations were established on 14 August 1986, followed by the opening of the Indonesian embassy in Harare on June 2. Indonesia has an embassy in Harare that is also accredited to Zambia, while Zimbabwe has an embassy in Jakarta. Both nations are members of the Non-Aligned Movement.

In May 2011, Indonesia and Zimbabwe signed a memorandum of understanding on the establishment of a joint commission on trade and investment. Indonesian business sees Zimbabwe as a potential new market in Africa. An Indonesian company has invested in the food sector in Bulawayo, Zimbabwe, that produces processed poultry and beef products.

== See also ==
- Foreign relations of Indonesia
- Foreign relations of Zimbabwe
