= Austria–Indonesia relations =

- Austria: Indonesia

Diplomatic mission
- Embassy of Austria, Jakarta: Embassy of Indonesia, Vienna

Austria and Indonesia established diplomatic relations on 20 November 1954. Austria recognizes Indonesia as a stable and reliable partner, and both countries enjoy excellent relations. The two nations have agreed to expand relations in business, trade and investment, tourism, culture, environment and green technology. Austria has an embassy in Jakarta and honorary consulates in Yogyakarta, Bandung and Surabaya, while Indonesia has an embassy in Vienna that is also accredited to Slovenia.

== History ==
Bilateral relations were officially established in 1954, a year before Austria regained complete sovereignty from the Allied Powers and nine years after the Indonesian proclamation of Independence In 2010, Austrian President Heinz Fischer visited Indonesia and paid a courtesy call to then Indonesian President Susilo Bambang Yudhoyono.

== Trade and investment ==
The bilateral trade volume between two nations in 2015 reached 445 million euros, with the balance of trade being more or less in equilibrium. Austria main exports to Indonesia are steel, machinery, electronic equipment, paper and pharmaceuticals, while importing footwear, textiles, spices, coffee and electronic goods from Indonesia. By 2017, there are around 40 Austrian corporations that run their operations in Indonesia.

== Technology, education and culture ==
Indonesia is keen to learn from Austrian expertise in renewable and sustainable technology, such as hydroelectric power, biomass energy, and solar energy. Austrian also has promoted the benefit of green technology, by showcasing its new "green embassy" in Menteng area Central Jakarta. Inaugurated in November 2011, Austrian Green Embassy in Jakarta demonstrate sustainable architecture in a tropical climate, saving energy and water by installing solar panels, rainwater storage system, shaded windows and thermal insulation.

In the education sector, the government of both countries has agreed on post-graduate student exchanges, signed between Indonesia's Ministry of Education and Austria's Agency for International Cooperation on Science and Research. Annually, Austria offers about 30 scholarships to Indonesian students, and every year there are around 40 Austrian students visit Indonesia to perform their study. Several Austrian universities also have established cooperation with their Indonesian counterparts, such as Gadjah Mada University and the Bandung Technological Institute.

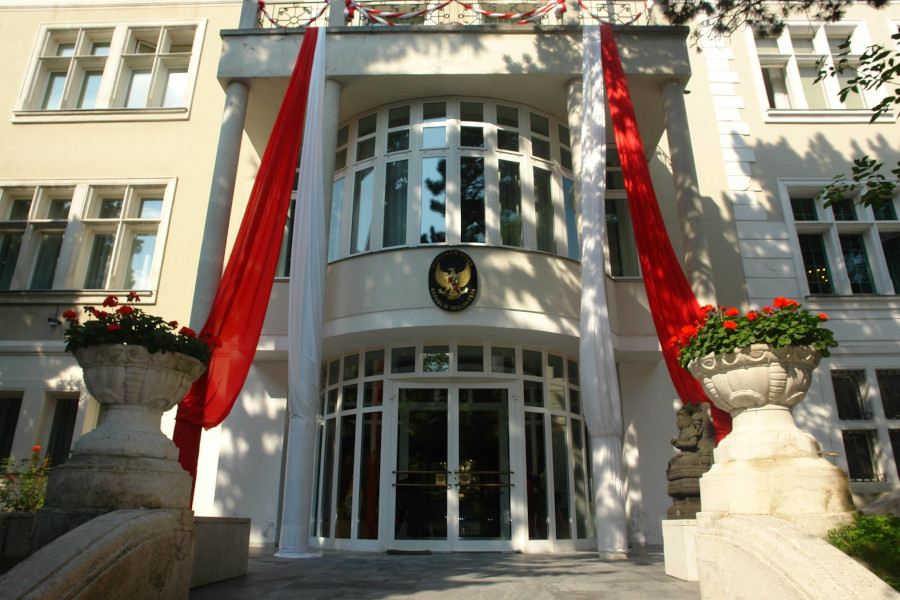
Embassy of Indonesia in Vienna

== See also ==
- Foreign relations of Austria
- Foreign relations of Indonesia
