= Indonesia–Jordan relations =

- Indonesia: Jordan

Jordan and Indonesia established diplomatic relations in 1950. Both are Muslim majority countries who, despite the challenges, wish to promote and projects the Islamic values of tolerance, justice and equality. Both nations often share similar stances upon issues in the Middle East, such as the Syrian Civil War and the Israeli–Palestinian conflict. Economy and trade relations are also particularly important, currently Indonesia is Jordan's largest trade partner in ASEAN. Jordan has an embassy in Jakarta, while Indonesia has an embassy in Amman that is also accredited to Palestine. Both countries are members of the Organisation of Islamic Cooperation and the Non-Aligned Movement.

== History ==
Indonesia and Jordan formally established diplomatic relations on 27 February 1950 when President Sukarno appointed Bagindo Dahlan Abdullah, a member of the Central Indonesia National Committee, to serve as the ambassador of the United States of Indonesia to Iraq, Syria, Lebanon, and Jordan with a permanent residence in Baghdad. Since then, both nations enjoys close and cordial relations. Both nations saw each counterpart geopolitics potential, as Indonesia saw Jordan as their gate to enter Israel and Palestine, while Jordan also saw Indonesian geopolitical importance in Southeast Asian region. Traditionally, Jordan serves as the gate for Indonesian Muslim and Christian pilgrims wishing to visit the holy sites in Israel and Palestine.

== Cooperations ==
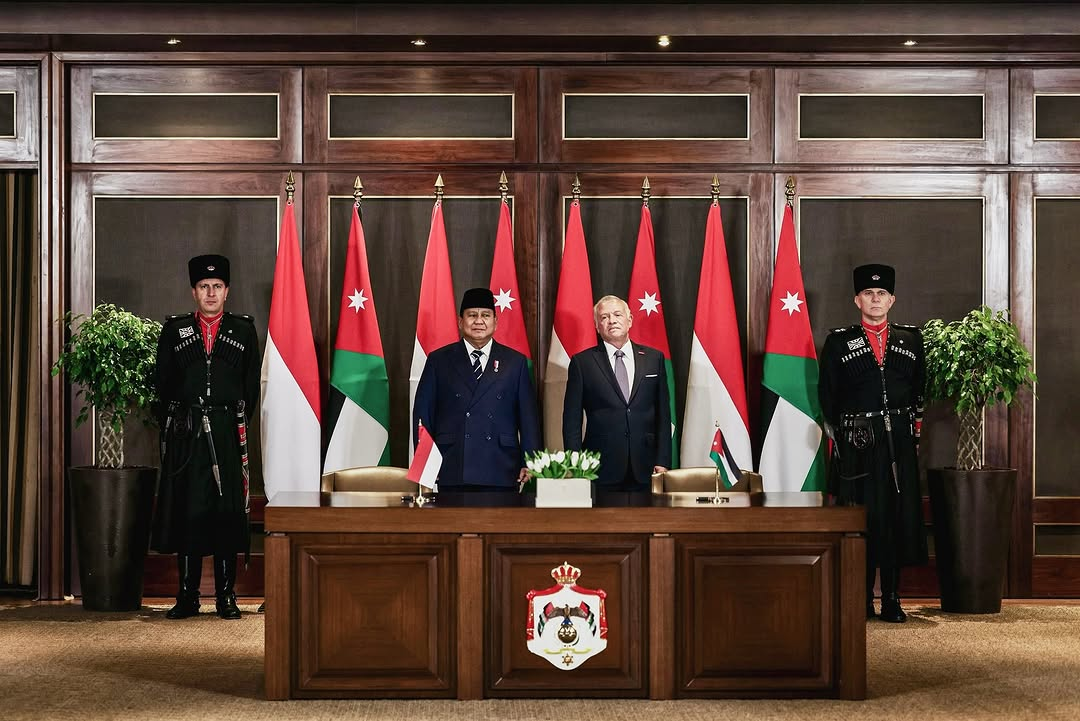
Indonesian President Prabowo Subianto and King Abdullah II of Jordan at the Al-Husseiniya Palace

In June 2009, the governments of Indonesia and Jordan have signed a memorandum of understanding on the placement and protection of the Indonesian migrant workers employed in Jordan. There are around 30,000 Indonesians working in formal and informal sectors in Jordan. King Abdullah Bin Al Hussein of Jordan visited Indonesia on 26 February 2014 and met President Susilo Bambang Yudhoyono. Both nations expressing their interest to forge a cooperation in defence industry.

On 14 April 2025, Indonesian President Prabowo Subianto made a state visit to Jordan. He and King Abdullah II held a bilateral meeting at the Al-Husseiniya Palace to discuss enhancing bilateral cooperation in a number of areas, including education, science, technology, and the economy. The two heads of state then witnessed the signing of the Memorandum of Understanding by representatives from both nations. The signed cooperation agreements included religion, education, agriculture, and defense.

On 14 November 2025, King Abdullah II made another state visit to Indonesia. He and Prabowo sought to deepen economic and military ties, signing a number of agreements, including one pertaining to the sharing of intelligence on Gaza.

== Trade and investment ==
The trade volume between Indonesia and Jordan from January to November 2013 stood at US$438.59 million, with a US$148.96 million surplus for Jordan. Jordan also has expressed their interest to invest in phosphate fertilizer sector by planning to build a phosphate factory in East Kalimantan and investing in PT Pupuk Kaltim.

== See also ==
- Foreign relations of Indonesia
- Foreign relations of Jordan
