= Indonesia–Rwanda relations =

- Indonesia: Rwanda

Diplomatic mission
- Embassy of Indonesia, Dar es Salaam: Embassy of Rwanda, Jakarta

Indonesia–Rwanda relations refer to foreign relations between Indonesia and Rwanda since the establishment of diplomatic ties on 16 January 1984. Both countries are members of the World Trade Organization, Non-Aligned Movement and the G77. Additionally, the two nations make major contributions to UN peacekeeping forces.

== History ==
On 15 November 2022, Paul Kagame, the President of Rwanda, visited Indonesia and met with Joko Widodo, the President of Indonesia, amid the G20 Summit in Bali. According to Rwandan Presidency, the two leaders discussed the future of bilateral cooperation including strengthening diplomatic relations between the two nations. In addition, President Jokowi suggested that a trade pact be established between Indonesia and Rwanda while also expressing his desire to see significant economic cooperation between Indonesia and Africa. In the meantime, President Kagame announced that he had accepted President Jokowi's invitation to the Summit and that a Rwandan embassy will open in Indonesia the following years. He also expressed gratitude to Indonesia for helping his nation's capacity building efforts.

In an effort to strengthen bilateral relations between Indonesia and Rwanda and as a follow-up to the plan to open the Rwandan embassy in Jakarta, the Indonesian Ambassador to Tanzania, Tri Yogo Jatmiko, met with the Rwandan Foreign Minister Vincent Biruta, the CEO of the Rwanda Private Sector Federation (RPSF), Stephen Ruzibiza, the Rwandan Ambassador Candidate to Indonesia, Sheikh Abdul Karim Harelimana, and representatives of the Rwanda-Indonesia Friendship Association (RIFA) in Kigali from 12 to 13 October 2023. Ambassador Jatmiko brought up a number of developments and prospective areas of focus for bilateral cooperation between Rwanda and Indonesia in an effort to convert the two nations' political proximity into agreements that have real-world effects for the community.

On June 6, The Rwandan government formally inaugurated its embassy in South Jakarta, Indonesia. According to Minister Biruta, the opening demonstrated Rwanda and Indonesia's steadfast dedication to forging close ties through bilateral collaboration. The inauguration of the Rwandan Embassy in Indonesia is a significant development in the history of relations between the two nations and is expected to act as a "bridge" for future collaboration on issues of shared interest, trade, and investment. Biruta went on to say that the establishment of an embassy in Indonesia is a testament to Rwanda's commitment to forging ahead with regional diplomacy and establishing a substantial footprint.

Following the inauguration, the signing of multiple memorandums of understanding (MoU) by Foreign Ministers Retno Marsudi and Biruta signaled a collaboration in three areas: general cooperation, political and security discussions, and the relaxation of visa requirements for holders of diplomatic service passports. Minister Retno expressed optimism that the opening of the Rwandan embassy would improve relationships between the two nations and between Indonesia and Africa. She reaffirmed Indonesia's dedication to promoting cooperative relationships with African countries and greeted Rwanda's entry into the upcoming second Indonesia-Africa Forum, which occurred in Bali on 2 September 2024.

On 29 January 2025, Athanase Rutabingwa was formally appointed as the Honorary Consul of Indonesia for Rwanda by Tri Yogo Jatmiko, the Indonesian Ambassador to Tanzania. Virgile Rwanyagatare, Director-General of Asia Pacific and the Middle East at Rwanda's Ministry of Foreign Affairs and International Cooperation, highlighted the two nations' long-standing historical connections as well as their growing cooperation.

== Trade ==
Indonesia sold $21.3 million to Rwanda in 2022. Indonesia's top exports to Rwanda were uncoated paper ($5.04 million), other vegetable oils ($6.87 million), and palm oil ($35.4 million). Indonesian exports to Rwanda have grown at an annualized rate of 137% over the last five years, from $283 thousand in 2017 to $21.3 million in 2022.

Rwanda sold $44.3 thousand to Indonesia in 2022. Integrated Circuits ($184 thousand), Uncoated Paper ($38.7 thousand), and Soap ($29.3 thousand) were Rwanda's top exports to Indonesia. Rwanda's exports to Indonesia fell at an annualized rate of 29.5% over the previous five years, from $255 thousand in 2017 to $44.3 thousand in 2022.

After the COVID-19 pandemic, Minister Retno claims that trade between Indonesia and Rwanda has improved even more. She said that the trade value between the two nations grew by 32% in the first quarter of 2024 after increasing by 100% the previous year. Having said that, there is still room for trade to grow in this area.

== See also ==
- Foreign relations of Indonesia
- Foreign relations of Rwanda
