= Indonesia–Tanzania relations =

- Indonesia: Tanzania

Indonesia and Tanzania established diplomatic relations on 25 January 1964. The relations between both nations are mostly in the agriculture sector, where Indonesia provides training for Tanzanian farmers. In 2011 both countries established Indonesia-Tanzania Joint Agriculture Cooperation Committee (JACC), as a vehicle to improve agricultural sector co-operations, such as capacity building through training, joint research, and the expansion of market access to agricultural products. Indonesia has an embassy in Dar es Salaam. Tanzania has a non-resident ambassador in Kuala Lumpur, Malaysia. Since 2023, Tanzania had opened an embassy in Jakarta. Both countries are members of multilateral organisations such as World Trade Organization (WTO), the Group of 77 and Non-Aligned Movement.

== History ==
The bilateral relations between Indonesia and Tanzania was established in 1965. In April 2005, Vice-President of Tanzania, Dr. Ali Mohammed Shein visited Indonesia to commemorate 50 years of the Asia-Africa Conference in Bandung. Indonesian Minister for Agriculture Anton Apriantono visited Tanzania in April 2007, reciprocated in September 2007 by his counterpart, the Tanzanian Minister for Agriculture visited Indonesia, which also signed the MoU on the Establishment of JACC (Joint Agricultural Cooperation Committee).

A new embassy chancery for Tanzania has been officially open in Jakarta since 2023. the building has been completed since 2022 and officially opened in 2023 by Retno Marsudi and Dr Stergomena Tax. Indonesian Presidents Suharto and Joko Widodo had visited Tanzania in 1991 and 2023, respectively.

=== Exchange of visits ===
High-level visits from Tanzania to Indonesia
	Title	Name	Year	Notes
1	President of Tanzania	Julius Nyerere	8 October 1981	
2	President of Tanzania	Ali Hassan Mwinyi	3 March 1987	
3	President of Tanzania	Samia Suluhu Hassan	25 January 2024	

High-level visits from Indonesia to Tanzania
	Title	Name	Year	Notes
1	President of Indonesia	Suharto	5 December 1991	
2	President of Indonesia	Joko Widodo	21-22 August 2023	

== Trade ==
Indonesia's government has expressed interest in creating a preferential trade agreement between the two countries. In 2022, Indonesian exports to Tanzania amounted to 74 million USD, led by palm oil and derivatives, while Tanzanian exports to Indonesia amounted to 28 million USD, primarily cloves, cocoa, and tobacco.

== Agriculture ==
The relations between two countries mostly emphasize on agriculture sector. In 1996 Indonesia established Farmer's Agriculture and Rural Training Centre (FARTC) in Mkindo, Morogoro, Tanzania, where Indonesian agriculture experts provide training for Tanzanian farmers. However, because of austerity measures the program was terminated in 2004. In 2007 Minister of Agriculture of Tanzania visited his counterpart in Indonesia, requesting the resuming of the FARTC program. In March 2011, Indonesian Government reactivated FARTC. For Indonesia, this agriculture assistance for Tanzania was motivated by the South–South cooperation and Non-Aligned Movement solidarity, which promote collective self-reliance especially in food security.
