= Indonesia–Kenya relations =

- Indonesia: Kenya

Diplomatic mission
- Embassy of Indonesia, Nairobi: Embassy of Kenya, Jakarta

Envoy
- Ambassador Witjaksono Adji: Ambassador Galma Boru

Indonesia and Kenya established diplomatic relations on 15 October 1979. Indonesia has an embassy in Nairobi, also accredited to the Democratic Republic of the Congo, Somalia, and Uganda. On 18 March 2022, Kenya established its embassy in Jakarta. Both nations are partners in multilateral organizations, such as the World Trade Organization (WTO), Non-Aligned Movement and the Indian Ocean Rim Association.

== History ==
The official bilateral diplomatic relations between both countries was established in 1979. During the period, the diplomatic affairs to Kenya was accredited to the Indonesian embassy in Dar es Salaam, Tanzania. The Indonesian embassy in Nairobi officially established in April 1982.

Indonesian and Kenyan foreign ministers have signed memorandums of understanding on 19 June 2008 in Nairobi, to establish the Joint Commission of Indonesia and Kenya. The commission serves as a forum to expand and improve cooperation sectors, also to solve bilateral problems. During their first meeting in Jakarta, 2–4 December 2008, the commission agreed to expand the cooperation in several sectors, such as economy, trade, social and culture, and technical cooperation. To improve people-to-people contact the commission has agreed on several cooperation possibilities, such as diplomats training, anti-terrorism drill, and athletic training.

== Official visits ==
Kenyan Cabinet Secretary of Foreign Affairs Monica Juma visited Indonesia in 2019 she met with her Indonesian counterpart Retno Marsudi and they discussed issues such as deepening ties and the possibility of Kenya opening an embassy in 2020.

From the 20th to 21st of August 2023, Indonesian President Joko Widodo made his first presidential visit to Africa and held bilateral talks with President William Ruto in Nairobi.

== Trade ==
In 2016, bilateral trade was worth KES.21 billion (US$210.8 million) IDR. 2.9 trillion.

Kenya's main exports to Indonesia were: tea and mate; Leather; Metallic salts and peroxysalts; Tobacco; vegetable textile fibres; Essential oils; Jute and other textile bast fibres; Vegetables, fresh, chilled, frozen; Coffee and coffee substitutes.

Indonesia's main exports to Kenya were: fixed vegetable fats (palm oil); Paper and paperboard; Textile yarn; Animal or vegetable fats and oils; Margarine and shortening; Natural rubber; Electrical machinery; electrical and non-electrical equipment; Glass; Articles of apparel and clothing accessories.

Kenya and Indonesia are taking steps towards signing a Preferential Trade Agreement.
