= Fiji–Indonesia relations =

- Fiji: Indonesia

Fiji and Indonesia established relations on 17 June 1974. At that time, the Indonesian mission to Fiji was accredited through the Indonesian embassy in Wellington, New Zealand. On 22 August 2002, Indonesia opened their embassy in Suva. Fiji reciprocated by opening their embassy in Jakarta on 6 April 2011 which is also accredited to East Timor and Singapore.

== Economic relations ==
Although the trade volume is relatively small with a value of US$36 million in 2007, Indonesia sees Fiji as a potential gate to enter the South Pacific market. According to the Indonesian Center for Statistics, the trade balance was heavily in favor to Indonesia that enjoyed trade surpluses for years. Indonesian exports to Fiji sees increasing trends that reached a total of US$18.63 million in 2006, US$18.74 million in 2007, and US$23.23 million in 2008.

Fijians mainly rely on foreign imports for their daily needs since those are not being produced locally. Fiji mainly traded with Australia and New Zealand, and Indonesia saw this as an opportunity to enter the local market. Indonesian exports to Fiji are mainly daily products such as paper, fiber, textiles, electrical equipments, home appliances and electronics, furniture, gift and craft, fashion products, convenience foods, coffee, shampoo, soap, detergent, plastics, chemicals, automotive and parts, and also agricultural equipments.

== Cooperation, education, culture, and assistance ==
Initially, the trade sector dominated the relations between the two countries. The two countries, however, have agreed to expand their relations in other sectors, including tourism, business and education. Fiji has sent dozens of their students to study in several Indonesian universities. On 8 January 2014, the Indonesian government donated FJ$1 million (US$528,899) for the formation of the proposed Regional Police Academy at Nasova, Suva. The academy which will be based in Fiji will train police officers from the four Melanesian Spearhead Group (MSG) countries.

From 23 to 24 April 2025, Fijian Prime Minister Sitiveni Rabuka traveled to Indonesia as part of an official visit intended to strengthen relations between the two nations. When he arrived at Merdeka Palace in Jakarta, he was given the highest ceremonial Guard of Honor.

On 23 June 2025, Indonesian Deputy Foreign Minister Arrmanatha Nasir highlighted Indonesia's commitment to enhancing bilateral cooperation with Pacific nations during a meeting with Fijian Prime Minister Sitiveni Rabuka at the MSG Summit. He praised Fiji as a key partner and expressed intentions to advance their relations. Indonesia anticipates Fiji's leadership in the MSG to promote constructive cooperation aimed at shared prosperity and peace.
