= Indonesia–Qatar relations =

- Indonesia: Qatar

Indonesia–Qatar relations were officially established on 10 November 1976. Both countries are Muslim-majority ones, with Indonesia being the largest. Both nations are members of Organization of Islamic Cooperation.

Indonesia and Qatar have both signed a number of memorandums of understanding in fields like air transport, tourism, and agricultural cooperation.

== High level visits ==
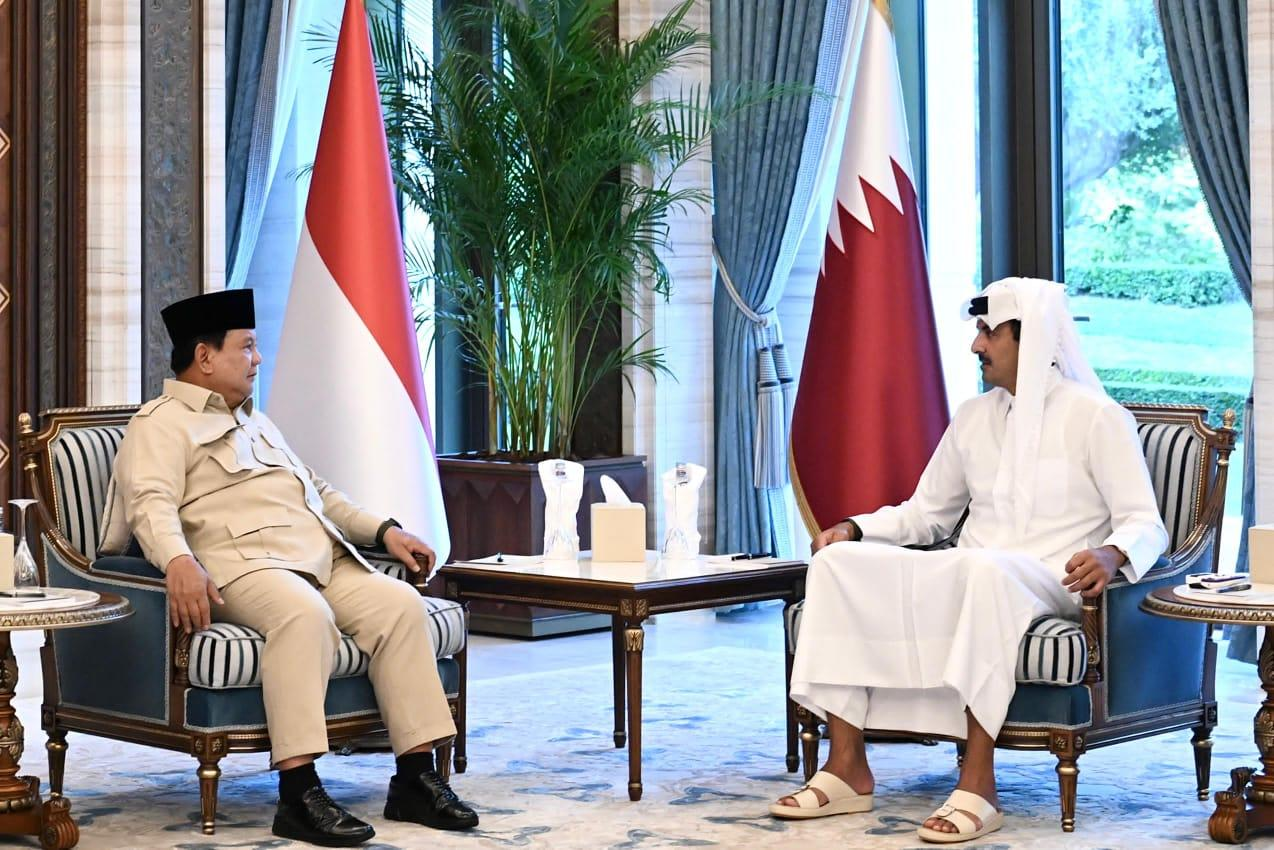
Indonesian President Prabowo Subianto and Qatari emir Sheikh Tamim bin Hamad Al Thani at Lusail Palace.

Because of its oil and natural gas resources, Qatar is among the world's richest countries. Indonesian president, Susilo Bambang Yudhoyono, paid a state visit in 2006 to Doha, to attract Qatari businesses to invest in Indonesia, while Qatar's emir, Sheikh Hamad bin Khalifa Al-Thani, visited Jakarta in 2009. During the Bali Democracy Forum IV in December 2011, Qatari Prime Minister Sheikh Hamad bin Jassim bin Jaber Al Thani met with Yudhoyono once again.

In April 2025, Indonesian president Prabowo Subianto made a state visit to Qatar. He and Emir Sheikh Tamim bin Hamad Al Thani witnessed the signing of the Memorandum of Understanding (MoU) of Strategic Dialogue between the governments of the two nations. The purpose of the MoU is to promote closer collaboration in a number of strategic areas. He visited Qatar again on 12 September 2025 in response to the Israeli airstrike on Hamas leadership in Qatar.

== Trade and investment ==
The total of bilateral trade volume in 2011 reached US$683.6 million, which was a 5.2% increase compared to those of 2010. The trade balance was heavily in favor to Qatar that over the years has booked trade surpluses over Indonesia. This is due to two main factors; first, the population and demographics of Qatar is too small to generate demands for Indonesian products, while the second is the seemingly perpetual increase of Indonesian need for oil, making the latter's imports almost solely related to oil. Indonesian exports to Qatar include furniture, office supplies, paper, electrical appliances, and home appliances.

Indonesia is among Qatar's investment destinations. In May 2010, Qatar Holdings, an investment arm of the Qatar Investment Authority, established an Indonesian fund worth $1 billion. A Qatari telecommunications company Qtel currently has a 65 percent stake in Indonesia's second largest telecommunications company, PT Indosat, worth more than US$3 billion. A number of Indonesian companies have also invested in Qatar, almost all of them being oil-related, including Indonesian state oil company PT Pertamina which operates Qatar's Sector-3 oil and gas block.

== Migrant workers ==
Currently, there are around 40 thousand Indonesians working in Qatar. Some of them work in the oil sector, while others work as domestic helpers. Qatar seeks skilled and trained workers from Indonesia, especially oil workers and nurses. According to Indonesian Ministry of Workers in early 2014, Qatar has posted a request for skilled Indonesian workers to fill thousands of jobs available there. Among others are position in oil and gas industry, hotel and hospitality sector, information technology, construction sector, and as nurses.

== Indonesian Embassy ==
Indonesia has an embassy in Doha.

- Ambassador Ridwan Hassan

== Qatari Embassy ==
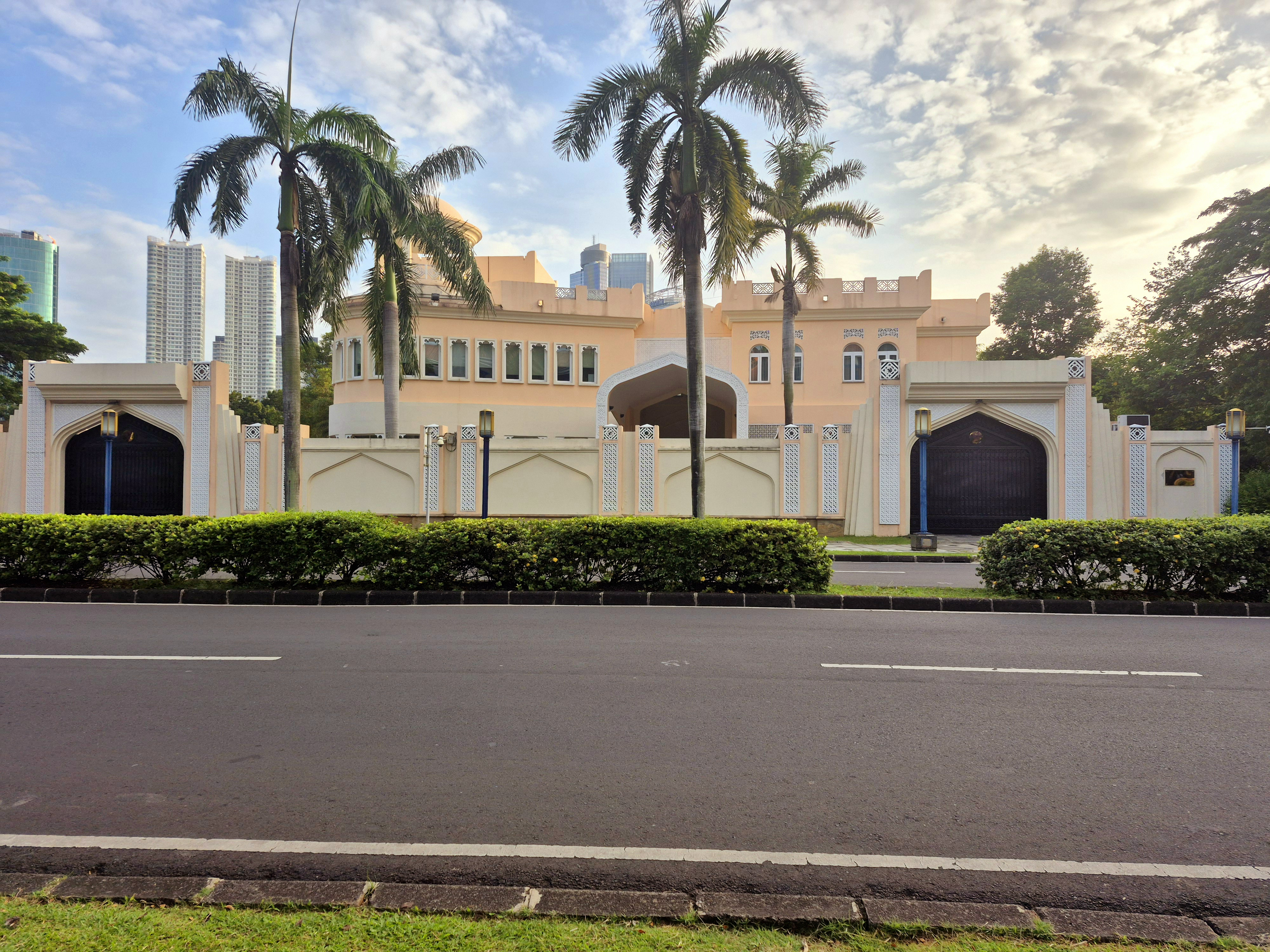
Embassy of Qatar in Jakarta

Qatar has an embassy in Jakarta.

- Ambassador Fawzia bint Idris Al Sulaiti
