= Indonesia–Laos relations =

- Indonesia: Laos

Indonesia and Laos established diplomatic relations in 1957. Indonesia has an embassy in Vientiane, while Laos have an embassy in Jakarta. Indonesia supported and welcomed Laos membership to the Association of Southeast Asian Nations (ASEAN) on 23 July 1997. Laos and Indonesia agreed to enhance relations to focus on exploring the potential of both nations to cooperate on trade and investment. The two nations expressed a desire to reach further agreements relating to security, tourism, sport, air transport and education. The two sides will also work together in cooperation with other ASEAN nations to ensure the ASEAN Community is established in 2015.

== History ==
Laos and Indonesia signed an Agreement for the Establishment of Diplomatic Relations on August 30, 1957.

Relations between Indonesia and Laos has grown significantly since Laos became a member of ASEAN in 1997. Indonesia was one of ASEAN member nations that support the inclusion of Laos into ASEAN.

== Trade ==
The trade between Indonesia and Laos was increasing by 300 percent in two years; from US$9.9 million in 2011 to US$27 million in 2012.

== Culture and education ==
Indonesia through bilateral cooperation assist Laos on capacity development in various sectors, through scholarships and training for Laos students. The Gadjah Mada University of Indonesia and National University of Laos agreed to sign an education agreement. The Indonesian government also cooperated with Japan Government (JICA), NAM Centre and Ministry of National Education of Indonesia, to organize various trainings and scholarships. These include Darmasiswa RI regular/short course program scholarship 2009/2010. Eleven Laos participant get Darmasiswa scholarships with 5 participants for Indonesian Language and 6 Participants for Culture study. Darmasiswa RI Master's degree Program Scholarship 2009/2010. Six 6 Lao students get master's degree scholarships.

Other trainings includes wood carving advanced training for Lao woodcarvers 28 January-28 February 2009. International training workshop on development of renewable energy, micro hydro energy end-use productivity for rural economic development 2–9 June 2009, Bandung – Indonesia. Training course on geo-information for Natural Hazard and Disaster Risk Reduction on 8 June -27 July 2009, Bogor and Cibinong-Indonesia. TCTP on capacity building for poverty Reduction 8 – 19 June 2009. TCTP on local government support and inter-sectoral collaboration in mother & child health program through mother and child handbook, Padang 29 June – 6 July 2009. International workshop on disaster risk management for Asia Pacific countries consultative expert meeting, Jakarta 9–11 June 2009.

Indonesian language course for Lao People is held every year at the embassy of the Republic of Indonesia's compound.
