= Indonesia–Kuwait relations =

- Indonesia: Kuwait

Indonesia–Kuwait relations were officially established on February 28, 1968. The relations focused on economy and trade sectors, especially on energy (oil) and human resources (migrant workers). Kuwait has an embassy in Jakarta, while Indonesia has an embassy in Kuwait City. Both countries are the member of Organisation of Islamic Cooperation and Non-Aligned Movement.

Indonesian President Susilo Bambang Yudhoyono visited Kuwait on April 29–30, 2006, and reciprocated by the visit of Kuwaiti Prime Minister, Sheikh Nasser Mohammed Al-Ahmed Al-Sabah to Indonesia on May 30 to June 1, 2007.

== Trade and investment ==
Kuwait imports from Indonesia are paper, cement, plywood, rubber, charcoal, food, furniture, ceramics, electronics, building materials, kitchen utensils and home appliances. While Indonesian imports from Kuwait are dominated by oil and oil products such as ethylene and polymers, also importing sack and bags, and goat leather products. The bilateral trade volume reached US$1.47 billion in 2010. Kuwait also expressed their interest to build a US$7 billion worth oil refinery in Indonesia.

== Migrant worker ==
In 2012 there are around 16,574 Indonesian migrant workers working in Kuwait. 1,982 of them works in formal sector, while the majority of 14,592 workers works in informal sector as domestic helpers. In 2013 there are around 2,000 jobs available and offered to Indonesian worker in formal and professional sector.
