= Indonesia–Libya relations =

- Indonesia: Libya

Indonesia–Libya relations were established on 17 October 1991. Indonesia has an embassy in Tripoli and Libya has an embassy in Jakarta. Both nations are members of the Organisation of Islamic Cooperation and the Non-aligned Movement.

In September 2003, Indonesian President Megawati Sukarnoputri visited Tripoli, and Muammar Gaddafi reciprocated by visiting Jakarta in February 2004. After the Arab Spring and the fall of Gaddafi, the Indonesian government through the Ministry of Foreign Affairs has offered Libya assistance for the transition to democracy, since Indonesia has had a similar experience before.

On 5 October 2025, the two nations agreed to establish a joint technical committee to address outstanding economic concerns and promote bilateral cooperation. Plans to create a regular consultation mechanism and sign memorandums of understanding in the areas of energy, education, culture, and investment were discussed. Opportunities in infrastructure, trade, and services were also investigated by both parties, with an emphasis on collaboration in ports, airports, health, and transportation.
