= Didik Eko Pujianto =

Indonesian diplomat (born 1966)

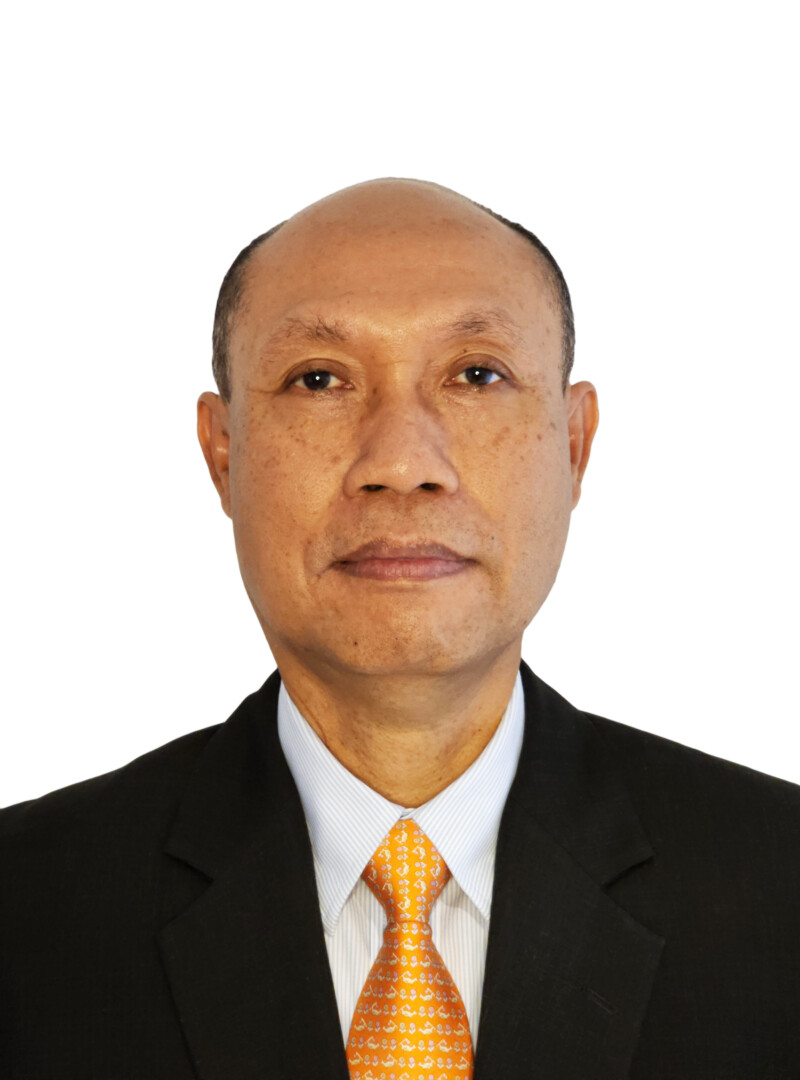

Ambassador of Indonesia to Iraq
- Incumbent
- Assumed office 24 March 2025
- President: Prabowo Subianto
- Preceded by: Elmar Iwan Lubis

Personal details
- Born: October 23, 1966 (age 59)

Didik Eko Pujianto (born 23 October 1966) is an Indonesian diplomat who is currently serving as ambassador to Iraq since 24 March 2025. Previously, he was the deputy chief of mission at the embassy in Singapore and the secretary of the directorate general of protocol and consular affairs.

== Career ==
Born on 23 October 1966, Didik joined the foreign ministry in March 1991. In the 2000s, Didik was assigned to the consulate general in Kinabalu, where he served as the head of chancery with the rank of first secretary. Didik then became the acting consul general in 2006, during which he criticized the underpayment and poor treatment of Indonesian employees by their superiors, which caused them to flee from the premises, and urges Malaysian authorities to penalize negligent employers and improve worker protections. The consulate general receives monthly reports of abuse and underpayment and collaborates with the East Malaysian Plantation Association to monitor conditions.

In February 2012, Didik was posted to the embassy in Seoul, serving within the political section with the rank of counsellor. He was posted in advance of the 2012 Nuclear Security Summit. After two years of service, he was promoted to the embassy's chief of consular affair with the rank of minister counsellor. During the 2015 MERS outbreak in South Korea, Didik issued cautious advisories to Indonesian citizens via social media and community groups instead of formal and massive warning in order to avoid alarming the public or straining diplomatic relations.

By 2016, Didik was transferred to the directorate general for protocol and consular affairs, serving as the deputy director (chief of subdirectorate) for repatriation and social assistance within the directorate for the protection of Indonesian citizens. During his tenure as deputy director, Didik was involved in repatriating illegal Indonesian hajj pilgrims who traveled with Filipino passports. He later published an op-ed criticizing Indonesian migrant workers who manipulated their data to meet overseas employment requirements, which caused them to face legal issues abroad, including accusations of document forgery.

On 3 January 2017, Didik was promoted as the director for consular affairs within the directorate general. He continued to be involved in matters relating to Indonesian migrants, especially regarding documentation for troubled migrant workers abroad. Issues include undocumented children born overseas, especially in cases where parents are not legally married or have abandoned them. The directorate also collaborated with the religious ministry's family directorate to improve marriage registration services for Indonesian citizens abroad.

Didik's stint as director lasted for about a year, as in mid-2018 he was posted to embassy in Singapore as the deputy chief of mission. In 2020, he became the embassy's chargé d'affaires ad interim between the departure of I Gede Ngurah Swajaya and the arrival of the new ambassador Suryopratomo. Didik continued to be involved in providing legal assistance to Indonesian migrant workers and announced that in 2020 alone, the embassy has spent 450 million rupiahs for the occasion.

Finishing his assignment in Singapore, Didik returned to the directorate general for protocol and consular affairs, serving as its secretary since 9 March 2022. In August 2024, President Joko Widodo nominated Didik as ambassador to Iraq. He passed a fit and proper test held by the House of Representative's first commission in September that year and was installed by President Prabowo Subianto on 24 March 2025. He arrived in Iraq and received his duties from the embassy's chargé d'affaires ad interim Abraham Franky Izaak Lebelauw on 24 July 2025. He presented his credentials to the President of Iraq Abdul Latif Rashid on 17 September 2025.
