= Indonesia–Syria relations =

- Indonesia: Syria

Diplomatic mission
- Embassy of Indonesia, Damascus: Embassy of Syria, Jakarta

Envoy
- Ambassador Wajid Fauzi: Ambassador Abdel Moneim Annan

Indonesia–Syria relations was officially established in 1950, and it was among earliest international recognitions on Indonesian sovereignty. Both nations have common perceptions related to Palestine, Iraq and Lebanon issues, and Indonesia always supports Syria in international forum on the issue of the Golan Heights. Regarding the current events of the Syrian Civil War, Indonesia has urged all parties in Syria to end the violence, while pledging to provide US$500,000 worth of humanitarian assistance to conflict-torn Syria in 2014. Previously Indonesia has donated the same amount to Syria in 2012 and 2013 under United Nations. Indonesia has an embassy in Damascus, while Syria has an embassy in Jakarta. Both nations are the member of Non-Aligned Movement and Organisation of Islamic Cooperation.

== History ==
During Indonesian National Revolution, Syria was among the earliest nations that support and the Indonesian struggle for independence. In 1947, Permanent Representative of Syria to the United Nations, Fares al-Khoury, had pushed the "Indonesian question" agenda to be discussed in United Nations Security Council. Official diplomatic relations were established on 27 February 1950 when President Sukarno appointed Bagindo Dahlan Abdullah, a member of the Central Indonesia National Committee, to serve as the ambassador of the United States of Indonesia to Iraq, Syria, Lebanon, and Jordan with a permanent residence in Baghdad.

As a response to the Fall of the Assad regime, Indonesian Deputy Foreign Minister Anis Matta called on the appropriate parties to protect the safety and security of the Syrian people and guarantees that Indonesia will continue to keep a careful eye on the situation in Syria. He underlined that Indonesia believes Syrians "can start a new and better life" and respects Syria's territorial integrity.

== High level visits ==
Indonesian President Suharto visited Syria in October 1977. Syrian Prime Ministers Mahmoud Zuabi visited Indonesia, and Muhammad Naji al-Otari in June 1997 and in January 2009 respectively.

== Economy and trade ==
The bilateral trade reached US$47.08 million in 2003 and grew to US$100 million in 2008. The balance of trade is weighed heavily in the favor of Indonesia whose exports include textiles, rubber, tea, coffee, palm oil, wood and paper.
