= Indonesia–Mozambique Preferential Trade Agreement =

The Indonesia–Mozambique Preferential Trade Agreement is a preferential trade agreement between Indonesia and Mozambique signed in August 2019 and in effect since June 2022.

== Terms ==
According to the initial agreement, Mozambique will eliminate tariffs on various Indonesian goods - primarily palm oil and its derivatives, but also certain industrial products such as pharmaceuticals and papers. There are also other Indonesian commodities with tariffs being cut by 25 to 70 percent from their initial tariffs. Indonesia, on the other hand, eliminated tariffs on Mozambican nuts, soybeans, sunflower seeds, cotton, and aluminium, in addition to reduction of tariffs ranging from 20 to 40 percent. Overall, this covered 217 Indonesian products and 242 Mozambican products.

Both parties would be capable of requesting a review of the agreement two years after it has been ratified and implemented.

== History ==
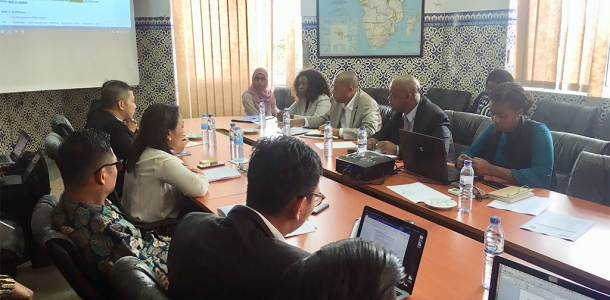
Negotiators in Maputo, February 2019, during final negotiations

Initial agreement between the heads of state of the two countries to form a preferential trade agreement (PTA) occurred in 2017, during a meeting of the Indian Ocean Rim Association. Negotiations for a potential PTA between Indonesia and Mozambique were proposed in April 2018, during the Indonesia–Africa Forum in Bali. In addition to Mozambique, negotiations were also initiated following the event with Morocco and Tunisia. In that year, Indonesia and Mozambique traded US$91.9 million worth of goods with one another, with a trade balance of US$30.9 million in favor of Indonesia. The initial round of negotiations began in Maputo between 31 May and 1 June 2018. In total, three rounds of negotiations were held – the initial negotiations, another round in November 2018, and a final round in February 2019.

The final agreement was signed in Maputo between Indonesian Trade Minister Enggartiasto Lukita and his Mozambican counterpart Ragendra de Sousa (Minister of Industry and Commerce) on 27 August 2019, during the annual international trade fair FACIM. It was the first trade agreement between Indonesia and an African country. Mozambique ratified the agreement on 22 November 2020 and Indonesia ratified the agreement in October 2021. The agreement came into effect on 6 June 2022.
