= Misinformation in the Gaza war =

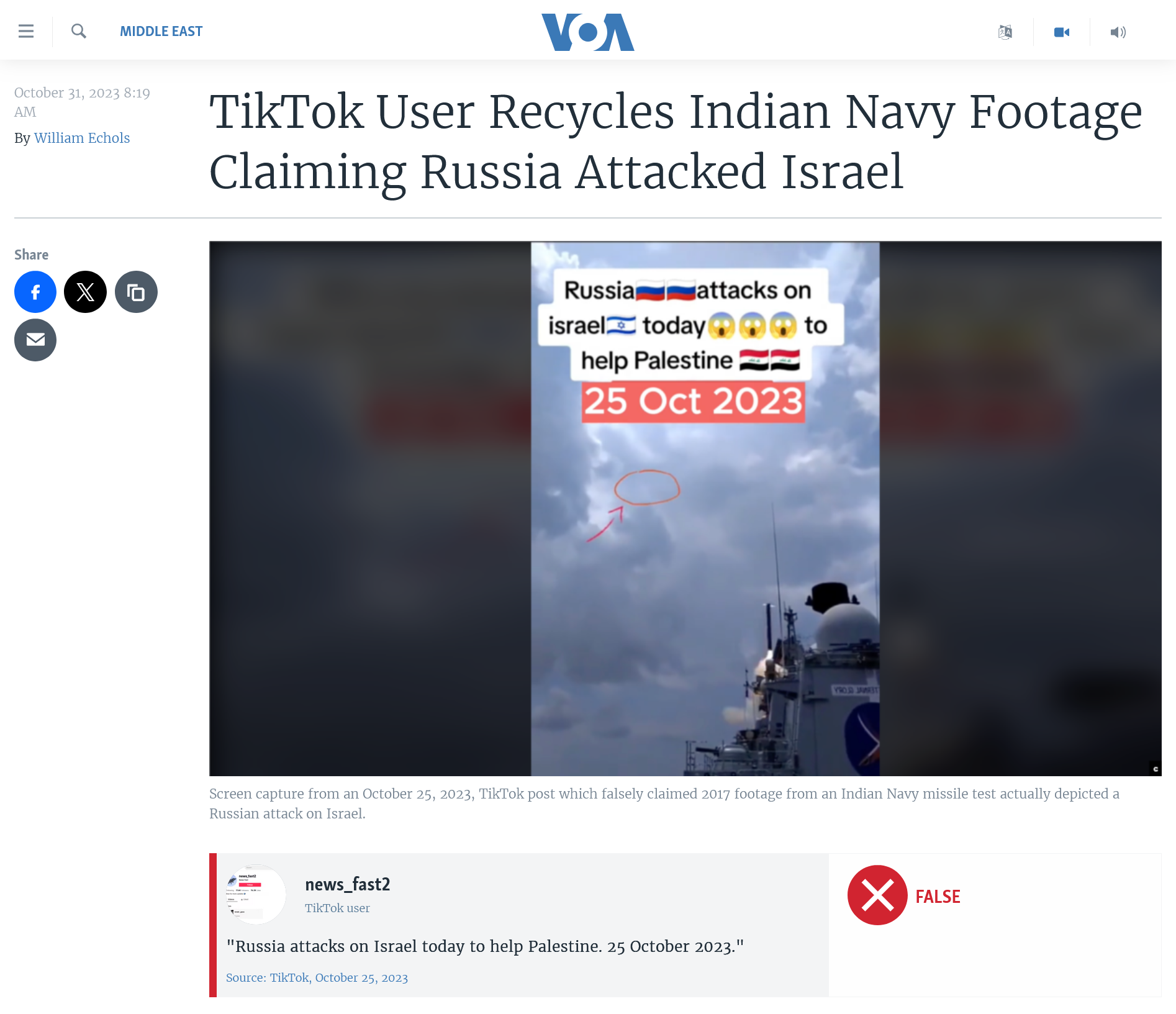
A fact-check by VOA debunking a claim that Russia had attacked Israel in October 2023 "to help Palestine", which was also debunked by Reuters.

Misinformation and disinformation involving the distribution of false, inaccurate or otherwise misleading information has been a prominent feature of the Gaza war. There have been allegations of bias in media coverage of the Gaza war, including social media as well as news media. Much of the content has been viral in nature, spreading online with tens of millions of posts in circulation on social media. A variety of sources, including government officials, media outlets, and social media influencers across different countries, have contributed to the spread of these inaccuracies and falsehoods.

The New York Times described the start of the Gaza war as releasing a "deluge of online propaganda and disinformation" that was "larger than anything seen before". It described the conflict as "fast becoming a world war online." According to the NYT, Russia, China, Iran and its proxies used state media and covert influence campaigns on social media networks to support Hamas, undermine Israel, criticize the United States and cause unrest. James Rubin of the U.S. State Department's Global Engagement Center called coverage of the conflict as being swept up in "an undeclared information war with authoritarian countries".

During the conflict, the Israeli government and Israeli cyber companies have deployed artificial intelligence (AI) tools and bot farms to spread disinformation and graphic, emotionally charged and false propaganda to dehumanize Palestinians, sow division among supporters of Palestine, and exert pressure on politicians to support Israel's actions. The Intercept reported that: "At the center of Israel’s information warfare campaign is a tactical mission to dehumanize Palestinians and to flood the public discourse with a stream of false, unsubstantiated, and unverifiable allegations." One such covert campaign was commissioned by Israel's Ministry of Diaspora Affairs. The ministry allocated about $2 million to the operation, and used political marketing firm Stoic based in Tel Aviv to carry it out, according to officials and documents reviewed by the New York Times. The campaign was started after the October 7 attacks, and remained active on X (formerly Twitter) at the time of the New York Times report in June 2024. At the peak of the campaign it used hundreds of fake accounts posing as Americans on X, Facebook and Instagram to post pro-Israel comments, focusing on U.S. lawmakers, particularly those who are Black and from the Democratic Party, including Hakeem Jeffries, the House minority leader from New York, and Raphael Warnock, Senator from Georgia. ChatGPT was deployed to generate many of the posts. The campaign also involved the creation of three fake English-language news sites featuring pro-Israel articles. In November 2024, a report by a United Nations (UN) committee noted that Western social media companies disproportionately removed content showing solidarity with the Palestinian people relative to content promoting violence against Palestinians.

== On 7 October attack ==
On 7 October 2023, deputy head of Hamas's political bureau, Saleh al-Arouri (based in Lebanon), claimed the Qassam Brigades had "captured senior officers from the occupation army" in the October 7 attacks. A rumour circulated on social media that one of these officers was Major General Nimrod Aloni, the commander of the Israeli Depth Corps, based on a photograph of a man who resembled him being detained by unidentified armed men. A Persian language post by the Israel Defense Forces (IDF) quoted a post about his capture from Tasnim News Agency and wrote "Tasnim: Distributors of fake news of IRGC" without either denying or confirming the capture of Aloni. Aloni was subsequently seen on 8 October attending a meeting of top Israeli military officials.

An Israeli boy and his sisters killed during Hamas's attack on Kibbutz Nir Oz on 7 October have been falsely accused of being "crisis actors".

A photo shared by Israel showing the charred corpse of a baby was claimed by many on social media to have been AI-generated, based on AI detector "AI or Not". The claim was repeated by Al Jazeera Arabic. The company behind "AI or Not" later said that the result was a false positive caused by the image's compression and blurred name tag; several experts who looked at the photo found it to be genuine. Other social media users claimed, based on a 4chan post, that the image had been altered from a similar photo of a dog, though researcher Tina Nikoukhah found that it was actually the dog picture which has been likely "falsified using generative methods".

The community volunteer paramedic and rescue group ZAKA began collecting bodies immediately after the Hamas attacks, while the IDF avoided assigning soldiers from Home Front Command who have been trained to carefully retrieve and document human remains in post-terrorism situations. Home Front Command soldiers and volunteers from other organizations accused ZAKA volunteers of spreading horror stories of atrocities that did not happen for self-promotion as well as "releasing sensitive and graphic photos to shock people into donating" and other unprofessional behavior. The Times of Israel reported that "A volunteer from a different organization told Haaretz that ZAKA also double-wrapped bodies in its own bags after they had already been placed in IDF or other organizations’ bags, creating a mess at headquarters when bodies were placed in the wrong sections." Haaretz reported this double-bagging was done for self-promotion purposes: "At the attack scenes, the question was not only what to photograph but also what exactly to show. In some cases, volunteers from Zaka were seen wrapping bodies already wrapped in IDF bags. The new bag prominently displayed the Zaka logo."

=== Allegations of beheading ===
In the aftermath of the initial Hamas assault, witnesses from the Israeli soldiers, the Israeli Forces, and the first responder Israeli organization ZAKA said on French Israeli TV channel i24news that they had seen the bodies of beheaded infants at the site of the Kfar Aza massacre. During US Secretary of State Antony Blinken's visit to Israel, he said he was shown photos of the massacre by Hamas of Israeli civilians and soldiers, and specifically that he saw beheaded IDF soldiers. U.S. President Joe Biden separately said that he had seen photographic evidence of terrorists beheading children, but the White House later clarified that Biden was alluding to news reports of beheadings, which have not contained or referred to photographic evidence. NBC News called reports of "40 beheaded babies" unverified allegations, adding that they appeared "to have originated from Israeli soldiers and people affiliated with the Israel Defense Force". They also added that "an Israeli official told CNN the government had not confirmed claims of the beheadings". The allegation mainly "stemmed from a viral Israeli news broadcast clip" and the main X / Twitter accounts propagating the claims were i24NEWS and Israel's official account, even though Israeli Defense spokesperson Doron Spielman told NBC News that he could not confirm i24NEWS's report. By 12 October, CNN had extensively reviewed online media content to verify Hamas-related atrocities but found no evidence to support claims of decapitated children. By the end of November, I24 had edited its article, removing the claim about 40 babies. In December 2023, Haaretz published the results of a comprehensive investigation into the violence of the 7 October attacks. The conclusion was that while Hamas had committed real "atrocities" that day, some of the extreme acts attributed to the group never happened and were fueling denial of the October 7 attacks. Although Hamas had desecrated or dismembered the bodies of some Israelis, these belonged for the most part to fallen soldiers, the article said. An April 2024 Le Monde investigation concluded that it was "a rumor born organically, out of a mixture of emotion, confusion and macabre exaggeration. Israel has done nothing to fight it and has more often tried to instrumentalize it than deny it, fueling accusations of media manipulation." Le Monde also noted that the myth was used by antisemitic misinformation influencers such as Jackson Hinkle to falsely infer that all Israeli claims about 7 October were false.

=== Allegations of sexual violence ===
The AP reported that two ZAKA volunteers made false statements about sexual violence and rape on 7 October. Chaim Otmazgin, a ZAKA commander, claimed he found a raped woman due to her pants having been pulled down below her waist. He showed photos to the AP as part of his testimony. However, it was found out later that the body was lying as it was due to being dragged around by Israeli soldiers to check if it was booby-trapped. Otmazgin said he publicly corrected himself after learning what had happened.

Members of ZAKA including Otmazgin and Simcha Greiniman claimed to have photos depicting genital mutilation, including nails and knives inserted into the groin and genitals. These were shared with the UN's Special Representative of the Secretary-General on Sexual Violence in Conflict Pramila Patten's fact-finding mission, as well as NBC News. Both concluded these claims could not be verified based on the provided photos. However Patten's report concludes that even though the exact scope of sexual violence can not be determined, at least five rapes occurred on 7 October.

Regarding claims that linked Palestinian militants to sexual assaults on 7 October, The Times has remarked that investigations have been hampered by "false and misleading information" spread by "senior [Israeli] political figures and government-linked civil activists". A UN report on these allegations has stated that Israeli authorities have been unable to produce the evidence politicians said existed.

==== Pregnant woman with her foetus claim ====
Yossi Landau, another ZAKA volunteer, claimed he found a pregnant woman killed with a fetus removed from her womb. This was also proven to be false. Landau offered to show Al Jazeera journalists images of the scene, but didn't have images which would identify the scene he described.

Shortly after 7 October, Cochav Elkayam-Levy, a legal expert from the Davis Institute for International Relations at Hebrew University of Jerusalem, former Israeli government lawyer, former member of the military spokesperson's unit and close associate of Prime Minister Netanyahu's, established the "Civil Commission on October 7th Crimes by Hamas against Women and Children", which aimed to give voice to the victims and their families. In June 2024, The Times reported that Elkayam-Levy spread a "debunked story" about a "pregnant woman and her slaughtered foetus", while also circulating "photographs of murdered female soldiers that turned out to be images of Kurdish fighters in Syria." The Times added: "Elkayam-Levy has nonetheless remained the most prominent public voice on the sexual violence of October 7, winning the country’s highest civilian honour, the Israel Prize, in April."

=== Dead baby in oven claim ===
In a speech to the Republican Jewish Coalition on 28 October, Eli Beer, founder of Israeli volunteer-based emergency medical services group United Hatzalah, claimed that Hamas had burned a baby alive in an oven. He attributed the claim to a United Hatzalah volunteer; one of them, Asher Moskowitz, also publicly made the claim. It was repeated by journalist Dovid Efune, commentator John Podhoretz and others, in tweets seen over 10 million times. Israeli journalists and police found no evidence for the claim, and a representative of ZAKA, a first responder organization, said the claim was "false".

=== "False flag" conspiracy theories ===
The 7 October attack by Hamas on Israel has become the subject of various conspiracy theories. These theories claim that the attack, which resulted in approximately 1,200 deaths in Israel, was a false flag operation conducted by Israel itself, despite the overwhelming evidence provided by multiple sources, including smartphone and GoPro footage capturing the breach of the border by Hamas forces.

This misinformation has been proliferating across various social media platforms, where hashtags linking Israel to "false flag" operations have seen a significant increase in usage. This spread of falsehoods was not limited to online spaces; it has manifested in real-world scenarios, including city council meetings and public protests, where individuals have publicly denied the facts of the attack.

Researchers and Jewish community leaders have expressed concern about the ties these conspiracy theories have to Holocaust denial and other antisemitic beliefs, with denial of the 7 October attacks described as part of a broader pattern of misinformation that seeks to distort historical events and promote antisemitic narratives.

Another unsubstantiated conspiracy theory that emerged following the 7 October Hamas attack suggests that the Israeli government, specifically Prime Minister Benjamin Netanyahu, had prior knowledge of the attack. Some even claim that Netanyahu issued a "stand-down" order to the Israeli military. The genesis of this theory appears to be from Charlie Kirk, a right-wing political activist and supporter of U.S. President Donald Trump, whose comments on a podcast fueled these claims. However, these assertions hinge solely on Kirk's personal speculations. Despite a lack of evidence, the theory has been influential in certain circles, especially among those critical of Netanyahu's leadership and Israeli policies.

=== Other false information ===
On 8 October, a video supposedly of Hamas thanking Ukraine for supplying them with weapons was shared by an X account linked to the Russian Wagner Group. It was viewed over 300,000 times and shared by American far-right accounts. The next day, former Russian president Dmitry Medvedev tweeted, "Well, NATO buddies, you've really got it, haven't you? The weapons handed to the Nazi regime in Ukraine are now being actively used against Israel." On 10 October, another video was released falsely claiming to be made by the BBC and purported to quote the investigative journalism website Bellingcat to confirm the sale of weapons between Ukraine and Hamas. Both the BBC and Bellingcat confirmed that the video was a fake and the claim was false.

Social media accounts based in India have spread pro-Israeli disinformation, with influencers misrepresenting videos purported to show school girls taken as sex slaves, or Hamas kidnapping a Jewish baby. Indian Twitter accounts spread an out-of-context video claimed to represent "dozens of young girls taken as sex slaves by a 'Palestinian' fighter", which was instead showing probably a school trip to Jerusalem. Another clip primarily shared by Indian users was purported to depict a kidnapped baby; however, the video was taken a month earlier and had nothing to do with Gaza. Fact-checker Pratik Sinha said the "Indian right-wing has made India the disinformation capital of the world". The trend forms part of a wider pattern of fake news in India with an Islamophobic slant, including disinformation on Palestinians coming from the BJP IT Cell, a department of India's governing party, the BJP.

Islamic Republic of Iran Broadcasting published images of the capture of commanders of Nagorno-Karabakh by the Azerbaijani army in September 2023 as the capture of Israeli commanders by Hamas.

== On the Gaza war ==
=== Images ===
Journalist access to the Gaza Strip has been severely restricted by Israel, leading to widespread accusations from media organizations and press freedom groups that the Israeli government is deliberately obstructing independent coverage in order to suppress evidence of its military actions and limit global scrutiny. Since the start of the war, Israel has only allowed limited media access to Gaza through IDF-escorted embeds, during which journalists have no freedom of movement and must submit their content for military review. Critics argue that this level of control results in selectively framed reporting that aligns with the Israeli military's perspective. Some analysts and press freedom organizations have described the resulting coverage as a form of propaganda due to the lack of independent verification and the inability to engage with Palestinian sources.

According to historian and photography expert Gerhard Paul, both the Israeli military and Hamas seek to influence Western public opinion, the former by determining which images can be released and denying journalists access, and if exceptions are made only granted under strict military supervision so they can "only see what they are supposed to see." Paul asserts that the Palestinian side, particularly Hamas, does so through the strategic use of emotionally charged imagery, and that many images, while not fabricated, are carefully composed or accompanied by misleading captions. Christopher Resch of Reporters Without Borders emphasizes that not all photographers in Gaza are affiliated with Hamas and warns that characterizing their work as propaganda can endanger them, as such accusations can lead to them being perceived as combatants and targeted accordingly. Resch also stated that, since the October 7 attacks, the Israeli government has attempted to cast doubt on the credibility of journalists and photographers reporting from the region.

=== Impersonations ===
Following the Al-Ahli Arab Hospital explosion, an X account claiming to be an Al Jazeera journalist said they had video of a "Hamas missile landing in the hospital". Al Jazeera subsequently clarified that they were not associated with the account, and it was later removed. Another X account that promoted pro-Kremlin misinformation claimed The Wall Street Journal had reported that the explosion was caused by a Mark 84 bomb but The Wall Street Journal had not published such a report.

In November 2023, a video appearing to show a nurse at the Al Shifa hospital went viral. She claimed that she was unable to treat patients because Hamas had taken over the entire hospital and were stealing fuel and medicine, with the video ending with her pleading for all Palestinians to leave Al Shifa. Many were quick to point out the falsehood in the video, as none of the documented doctors and nurses at the hospital recognize the woman depicted, and a reported Israeli accent and inability to speak clear Arabic. Additionally, according to Esther Chan from RMIT FactLab's CrossCheck, an analysis by open-source investigators had determined that the video was likely doctored to artificially include fake sounds of explosions. The video was originally posted on the Ministry of Foreign Affairs of Israel's Arabic Twitter account and it was boosted by Edward Haïm Cohen Halala, who has reported ties to the Israeli government, and has a popular social media presence with an Arabic following.

=== Pallywood allegations ===
Analyses conducted by BBC Verify and Logically Facts found that usage of the Pallywood term had increased on social media platforms following the October 7 attacks, with BBC Verify finding a peak of 220,000 uses on Twitter in November 2023. Logically Facts also found that most usages of the term came from the United States, followed by India and Israel. During the Gaza war, conspiracy theories involving online influencers mocking victims and claiming that Palestinians are using "crisis actors" went viral on social media, often citing the "Pallywood" term. Israel's official Twitter account accused Gazans of placing live people in body bags before deleting the Tweet, while AIPAC promoted similar content. Many of the viral videos used to "prove" that crisis actors exist have been disproven. The term often results in anti-Muslim hate speech and was especially popular after Israel announced plans to increase its aerial bombardment of Gaza. A video showing a Palestinian child killed during an October 11 Israeli airstrike on Zeitoun was falsely claimed to be staged using a doll. The claim was promoted by official Israeli government social media accounts, including the X accounts of Israel's embassies in France and Austria, as well as pro-Israel and anti-Hamas accounts.

=== Sexual violence ===
On 25 March 2024, Al Jazeera took down its video of a woman named Jamila al-Hissi who said that Israeli soldiers had "raped women, kidnapped women, executed women, and pulled dead bodies from under the rubble to unleash their dogs on them" during their siege of Al-Shifa Hospital. Former managing director of Al Jazeera, Yasser Abu Hilalah, wrote on X, "Hamas investigations revealed that the story of the rape of women in Shifa Hospital was fabricated." Abu Hilalah reported that al-Hissi "justified her exaggeration and incorrect talk by saying that the goal was to arouse the nation's fervor and brotherhood".

=== Gaza Health Ministry casualty reports ===
The Gaza Health Ministry's (GHM) figures are used by most humanitarian agencies and widely cited in media sources; they are considered to be reliable by many experts and have been verified by several independent bodies, but have been challenged by Israeli and US agencies. The Biden administration initially disputed the GHM's casualty count and in 2024, the US House of Representatives voted to ban the State Department from citing the GHM's casualty figures. The administration ultimately changed to faith in the health ministry statistics. The GHM's casualty count was also disputed by several US politicians, the Anti-Defamation League, AIPAC, The Washington Institute for Near East Policy, and the Foundation for Defense of Democracies. The GHM's casualty count was also initially disputed by the Trump administration but was later cited by President Trump. In January 2026, an Israeli military official admitted that the GHM's death tolls were accurate.

Abraham Wyner, a Pennsylvania professor of statistics, wrote in Tablet that the GHM casualty figures were "faked". Wyner's article was analyzed by professor Joshua Loftus of the London School of Economics, who concluded Wyner's article was "one of the worst abuses of statistics I’ve ever seen". Columbia professor Les Roberts said that GHM numbers were accurate and probably even an underestimate. Wyner's main argument was that from 26 Oct – 10 Nov, the number of deaths per day is 270 with "strikingly little variation". CalTech statistician Lior Pachter responded that Wyner had cherrypicked a particular period, outside of which the variance was higher; and even within Wyner's picked timeframe the daily deaths had a standard deviation of 42.25 and variance of 1,785. Wyner also said that there were peculiarities in the data, such as a strong negative correlation between the daily death counts of men and women. In response, Marine Corps professor James Joyner quoted an opinion that GHM updates total deaths immediately, but there is a lag in updating the proportion of women and children, making time correlations "meaningless". Wyner later told The Intercept that he had only disputed the proportion of women and children killed but not the GHM's total casualty count.

In October 2024 the research group Action on Armed Violence (AOAV) published a report based on the GHM's latest data concluding that at least 74% of the at the time 40,717 Gazan fatalities identified by the Ministry were civilians, and that this is likely to be an underestimate. The Henry Jackson Society's Andrew Fox published a report on 13 December 2024 alleging that the Gaza Health Ministry inflated the number of civilians deaths caused by Israeli attacks. According to the report there were significant errors in the data, with men being registered as women, adults as children, and natural deaths counted as killed by Israeli attacks, which were intentionally inserted to inflate the civilian death toll. Professor Michael Spagat of AOAV responded by noting that such errors were marginal and random, as Fox only identified 2 adults registered as children, 3 "natural deaths", and misclassified sex cases affect 0.5% of the overall figures. Moreover, these errors went in both directions in roughly the same amount (67 men listed as women, 49 women listed as men, and age adjustments were spread widely across sex and age category). Spagat thus concluded that these were routine and minor calculation errors that do not affect the GHM's overall data on civilian deaths.

In January 2025 a peer-reviewed analysis of deaths due to traumatic injury in the Gaza war between October 2023 and 30 June 2024 was published in the medical journal The Lancet, estimating over 70,000 deaths from traumatic injuries as of October 2024, with 59.1% of them being women, children and the elderly. It also noted that its findings "underestimate the full impact of the military operation in Gaza, as they do not account for non-trauma-related deaths resulting from health service disruption, food insecurity, and inadequate water and sanitation." Another independent peer-reviewed analysis of casualties was published in The Lancet by Michael Spagat and other researchers. They estimated 75,200 violent deaths and 8,540 excess non-violent deaths between 7 October 2023 and 5 January 2025. The estimate of violent deaths is 34.7% higher than the GHM's casualty count at the time. Of the violent deaths, the researchers estimate that 56.2% were women, children, and elderly individuals.

=== Disinformation campaigns ===
According to information security experts interviewed by the New York Times, Iran, Russia, China, Iran's proxies, Al Qaeda and the Islamic State have been conducting massive online disinformation efforts focused on "[undercutting] Israel, while denigrating Israel's principal ally, the United States". Researchers have documented at least 40,000 bots or fake social media accounts, as well as strategic use of state-controlled media outlets like RT, Sputnik and Tasnim. An analysis by Haaretz found that hundreds of fake accounts on social media were targeting Democratic Party lawmakers with spam messages repeating Israeli government accusations relating to UNRWA and Hamas.

A Russian disinformation campaign known as Doppelganger has pushed false information about the war using fake websites that mimic the appearance of news sources such as Fox News, Le Parisien and Der Spiegel.

In June 2024, Israel's Ministry of Diaspora Affairs was revealed to have paid $2 million to Israeli political consulting firm Stoic, to conduct a social media campaign, fueled by fake accounts and often employing misinformation, targeting 128 American Congresspeople, with a focus on Democratic and African-American members of the House of Representatives. Websites were also created to provide young, progressive Americans with Gaza news with a pro-Israel spin. Among the objectives of the campaign was amplifying Israeli attacks on UNRWA staffers and driving a wedge between Palestinians and African-Americans to prevent solidarity between the two groups. The campaign also took aim at people in Canada, who were exposed to Islamophobic content smearing Canadian Muslims and implying that pro-Palestinian protesters aimed at imposing Sharia law. Messages were also directed to people in the Gulf Arab countries, arguing that humanitarian concern for Palestinians was a wasteful distraction from local affairs.

In August 2025, Xaviaer DuRousseau and other American and Israeli social media influencers went on a paid trip to Gaza by the diaspora affairs ministry to film and share content from the distribution sites. According to Haaretz, the aim of the campaign is to "reveal the truth" about the conditions in Gaza. DuRousseau stated on Twitter, "There is enough food at this aid base to feed every person in Gaza for at least a week, but the UN, Hamas, etc refuse to distribute the food efficiently. Instead, it sits here to spoil and be stolen. How’s that Israel’s fault?".

=== Other fake and misrepresented videos ===
According to the New York Times, many images and videos that circulate on social media pretending to be from the Gaza war are in fact from other conflicts, such as the Syrian civil war; and even of natural disasters, such as a recent flood in Tajikistan. Pro-Hamas accounts and online personalities sympathetic to Russia and Ba'athist Syria have also misrepresented footage from the Syrian civil war as showing children being killed in Gaza.

A video of a CNN broadcast from near the Israel-Gaza border with audio added to suggest the network had faked an attack went viral on social media.

Videos falsely linked to the war included a video of children in cages posted on 4 October, footage from 2020 of Iranian lawmakers chanting "Death to America", and photos of the Cairo Tower in Egypt appearing to be lit with the Palestinian flag spread on social media, which turned out to be a modified version of the tower in 2010. Footage from video game Arma 3 has been presented as war footage.

Social media users on both sides of the war shared behind-the-scenes footage of an actor lying in fake blood from a 2022 Palestinian short film, alleging it was evidence that the other side was creating propaganda. A video of Egyptian paratroopers flying over the Egyptian Military Academy that was falsely claimed to show Hamas militants infiltrating an Israeli music festival went viral on X in Indonesia. An AI-generated video of model Bella Hadid supposedly apologising for her past remarks and expressing support for Israel circulated on social media.

During the early stages of the war, a video described as "Hamas executes people by throwing them off a roof of a building!" was shared widely on social media. But the video did not depict Hamas, or any other group based in Palestine, it was a misrepresented video of ISIS in Iraq, from 2015. A July 2015 report from Al Arabiya, included identical images and that were originally shared by ISIS, and showed the execution of four gay men by ISIS in Fallujah, in Iraq.

In February 2024, Israel's official X account posted a 30-second video listing the humanitarian aid it claimed to have provided for Gaza. However the video included footage showing tents and equipment that was actually filmed in March 2022 and depicted a camp in Moldova for Ukrainian refugees. The same account later deleted the video, and stated that "the photo was for illustrative purposes and we should have stated that in the video."

=== Other false information ===
Viral claims that the IDF had destroyed Gaza's Church of Saint Porphyrius on 9 October were debunked by the church. Subsequently, an Israeli airstrike hit the premises of the church on 19 October, killing 18.

In October 2023, disinformation experts uncovered an account on X that published false reports about Qatar threatening to cut off its gas exports if Israel continued to bombard the Gaza Strip.

=== Claims by Israeli officials and army ===
==== Public diplomacy of Israel ====
During the Gaza war, the Israeli government and Israeli cyber companies have deployed artificial intelligence (AI) tools and bot farms to spread disinformation and graphic, emotionally charged and false propaganda. In The Intercept, Jeremy Scahill characterized these efforts as information warfare aimed at "flood[ing] the public discourse with a stream of false, unsubstantiated, and unverifiable allegations."

==== Misinformation and disinformation ====
On multiple occasions, analyses have found issues with claims by the Israeli Defense Forces (IDF). In October 2023, a Financial Times analysis on a bombing of Palestinians evacuating Gaza City found that "most explanations aside from an Israeli strike" could be ruled out, though the IDF blamed the attack on Palestinian militants.

In October 2023, shortly after the Al-Ahli Arab Hospital explosion, Israeli sources published audio purporting to show two Hamas militants in a phone call claiming responsibility for the act and blaming it on a malfunctioning rocket. BBC and CNN said they could not verify the recording. British Channel 4 News reported on a forensic analysis of the alleged Hamas operative audio released by the IDF, concluding that it was digitally manipulated. Two Arabic language journalists said that the recording did not appear authentic, because the "language, accent, dialect, syntax and tone" were not credible. Channel 4 News also reported on a preliminary audio assessment performed by a sonic analysis company called Earshot, which concluded that the audio recording had been edited to fuse two channels that were recorded separately, one for each speaker. In November 2023, analysis by the BBC found that a video released by the Israeli military following the Al-Shifa Hospital siege had been edited despite IDF claims to the contrary.

On 4 December 2023, Haaretz reported on Israeli claims about beheaded babies, stating that these "unverified stories [had been] disseminated by Israeli search and rescue groups, army officers and even Sara Netanyahu". (Note: The false claims that babies were beheaded in the Hamas assault were not promoted only by Israeli civilians or rescue volunteers, but also by the government. Le Monde has stated: "Israel has done nothing to fight it and has more often tried to instrumentalize it than deny it, fueling accusations of media manipulation.") Haaretz journalists Nir Hasson and Liza Rozovsky related the chronology of the news items about "beheaded babies" and "hung babies" and concluded, "this story is false." They quoted Ishay Coen, a journalist for the ultra-Orthodox website Kikar HaShabbat, who admitted he made a mistake by unquestioningly accepting the IDF's statements. "Why would an army officer invent such a horrifying story?", Hashabbat asked, adding, "I was wrong."

In December 2023, an analysis by The Washington Post confirmed reports by Human Rights Watch that Israel had used white phosphorus in an attack on Lebanon, directly contradicting the IDF. In January 2024, after an Israeli airstrike killed journalist Hamza Dahdouh, the IDF called Dahdouh a "suspect" who was hit while driving with a "terrorist"; however, The Washington Post found "no indications that either man was operating as anything other than a journalist that day".

After reports spread that a mother and daughter were killed by Israeli snipers in December 2023 in a church where a number of Palestinian Christians sheltered, the Israeli army denied targerting the compound. They claimed instead there was Hamas activity in its vicinity and Israeli soldiers shot back. Catholic officials and Member of British Parliament Layla Moran, who maintained contact with refugees in the church, stated, on the contrary, that no Palestinian belligerents were in the area and that the two women had been killed by the Israeli army, who were the ones preventing the refugees from leaving.

In November 2023, a video posted by the IDF showed Daniel Hagari, inside the Al-Rantisi Children's Hospital, where he claimed that the IDF had found Hamas weapons and technology, as well as a "list of terrorist names" in Arabic with the title "Operation Al-Aqsa Flood", showing each agents' rota guarding the hostages. However, a translation of the document showed that it contained no names but instead a calendar of the days of the week. After the questioning of the veracity of the claim, an Israeli spokesperson backtracked, but CNN, while removing the segment, did not provide an editors' note acknowledging the change or the dispute over the initial video.

In regards to the March 2024 Flour massacre, a CNN investigation said that "Mark Regev, the Israeli prime minister’s special adviser, initially told CNN that Israeli forces had not been involved." However the IDF said soon after that "soldiers had not fired directly on Palestinians seeking aid, but rather fired 'warning shots' in the air." Al- Jazeera reported evidence of a "large number" of gunshot wounds from a United Nations team, medical professionals and witnesses. The New York Times also reported that witness accounts differed from the Israeli military account who described extensive shooting after thousands massed around aid trucks. IDF drone footage edits out the events causing the crowds to disperse and rejected a CNN request for the full unedited footage. The CNN investigation cast doubt on other IDF claims such as the timing of shooting. Several days after the attack, a senior crisis response adviser at Amnesty International stated, "There is concrete evidence that contradicts whatever statements are being made by the Israeli authorities".

After bombing a tent camp in Rafah in an area that Israel had designated as a "safe zone" for civilians, killing 45 people, Israeli officials initially told their American counterparts that they believed their airstrike ignited a nearby fuel tank, creating a large fire. In one video, an unnamed Gazan narrator said the explosion was caused by a "Hamas jeep loaded with weapons". Later, the IDF suggested that a militant warehouse containing ammunition or "some other material" in the area caused the fire. It also released an Arabic phone call in which they clearly say that the Israeli missile was not responsible for the fire, that the fire was caused by secondary explosions, and the secondary explosions came from an ammunition warehouse. However, James Cavanaugh, a specialist who worked at the ATF, said the fire did not indicate "some giant stash that exploded." The New York Times viewed numerous videos and did not find evidence that a significant secondary explosion was ignited.

The Israeli army also denied responsibility for the killing of 5-year-old Hind Rajab, her family and the Palestine Red Crescent Society paramedics sent to rescue her, saying that their forces were not in firing range on the day of the girl's death. However, both Al Jazeera and The Washington Post concluded, based on investigation of satellite imagery, that Israeli armored vehicles were indeed in the area at the time.

In March 2025, Israel killed 15 paramedics from the Palestine Red Crescent Society and buried them in a mass grave along with their ambulances. The IDF initially claimed, "several vehicles were identified advancing suspiciously toward IDF troops without headlights, or emergency signals, their movement was not co-ordinated in advance. Thus, IDF troops opened fire at the suspected vehicles." However, after video evidence emerged showing the ambulances were clearly marked and using both headlights and flashing emergency lights, the IDF called their initial account "mistaken."

On 19 March 2025, Israel attacked a UN guest house in Deir al-Balah, killing one UN worker. Israel initially denied having attacked the guest house, but subsequently admitted responsibility in April 2025.

An investigation published by +972 Magazine found that 3D animations of Gaza, Lebanon, Syria, and Iran published by the Israeli army used existing visuals from third-party sources. An animation showing a supposed Hamas command center under Al-Shifa Hospital had been previously used by the army prior to the war to claim there was a tunnel under an UNRWA school. An animation of the Mushtaha Tower used images published by the Scottish Maritime Museum.

==== Unverified information ====
In other instances, Israeli forces' claims have been questioned based on an apparent lack of evidence. In December 2023, Israel stated there was a Hamas tunnel network connected to the Al-Shifa Hospital; however, a report by The Washington Post found "There is no evidence that the tunnels could be accessed from inside hospital wards". Over the course of the war, repeated Israeli attacks on hospitals were justified by the Israeli military's claims that the hospitals were used by militants. The Associated Press, however, stated that after months of investigations, it found that Israel had provided "little or even no evidence" of a significant militant presence near the al-Awda, Indonesian, or Kamal Adwan hospitals prior to their raids.

In January 2024, Israel claimed that 12 UNRWA staff members had participated in the 7 October attack on Israel; however, the Financial Times, Sky News, Channel 4, and other news outlets all stated that Israel's claims were not proven by the intelligence documents they reviewed.

In February 2024, the IDF stated Hamas was stealing humanitarian aid, leading David M. Satterfield, a senior U.S. envoy, to say there was no evidence to support Israel's claims.

In July 2024, Bild and the Jewish Chronicle published stories based on what they claimed were internal Hamas documents, alleging that Hamas leader Yahya Sinwar opposed a Gaza ceasefire and used negotiations as psychological warfare. The documents were later found to be fabricated, and four Israelis, including an aide to Netanyahu, were arrested for falsifying and distributing them. The fake documents also claimed Sinwar was planning to smuggle himself and Israeli hostages through the Philadelphi corridor into Egypt. At the time, Netanyahu was refusing to withdraw Israeli forces from the area and falsely claimed that Hamas, not Israel, was sabotaging ceasefire negotiations.

In September 2024, the IDF stated it was launching an investigation into the release of forged Hamas documents that were leaked to the international press, apparently in an attempt to sway Israeli public opinion against a hostage-ceasefire deal.

In December 2024, the New York Times reported that at least 24 UNRWA employees were members of Hamas or Palestinian Islamic Jihad, with most allegedly part of Hamas’s armed wing. The report was based on “secret Hamas military plans” that purportedly identified schools as strategic sites. The Times did not mention that prior allegations had been disproven, but acknowledged it could not verify the records, which were provided by the Israeli military, noting they resembled previous Hamas documents. When Drop Site News asked which documents the Times was referring to, they did not respond. UNRWA spokesperson Tamara Alrifai criticized the story, saying it fed into a narrative of UNRWA being a Hamas front, despite repeated debunking of such claims. She added, “UNRWA shares the lists/names of its staff in the occupied Palestinian territory with the government of Israel every single year, so it is astonishing that a country with some of the highest intelligence and military security in the world has not come back to a UN agency with concerns about staff until the war started.”

== On the United Nations ==
In February 2024, Volker Türk, the UN human rights chief, stated that the United Nations had been the subject of disinformation attacks, saying, "The UN has become a lightning rod for manipulative propaganda and a scapegoat for policy failures."

United Nations (UN) Director-General Antonio Guterres has accused Israel of spreading misinformation about the war in Gaza in an attempt to lower the credibility of the UN.

"I've heard the same source many times saying that I never attacked Hamas, that I never condemned Hamas, that I am a supporter of Hamas. I asked for a statistic to be made by our colleagues. I have condemned Hamas 102 times, 51 of them in formal speeches. The others in different social platforms. So, I mean, the truth in the end always wins." United Nations Director-General Antonio Guterres.

== In international politics ==
A fake memo that purported to show President Biden authorizing $8 billion in aid to Israel circulated on social media and was cited in articles by Indian news outlets Firstpost and Oneindia.

In September 2024, CNN hosts Jake Tapper and Dana Bash falsely accused U.S. House Representative Rashida Tlaib of stating that Michigan Attorney General Dana Nessel was unable to do her job because of her religion—something Tlaib never stated. Bash and Tapper were repeating claims first made by Nessel in a social media post criticizing a racist caricature suggesting Tlaib was a member of Hezbollah. Steve Neavling, the Metro Times journalist who conducted the original interview with Tlaib, called the claims against her "spurious".

== Role of social media platforms ==
Disinformation about the war has spread on social media platforms, particularly X (formerly known as Twitter). The European Union warned Elon Musk and Mark Zuckerberg that X and Meta were hosting disinformation and illegal content about the war, with potential fines of up to 6% of the companies' global revenue according to the Digital Services Act.

In response to the reports, X's CEO Linda Yaccarino told EU internal market commissioner Thierry Breton that it had "taken action to remove or label tens of thousands of pieces of content" and removed hundreds of accounts linked to Hamas.

According to NewsGuard, "at least 14 false claims related to the war garnered 22 million views across X, TikTok, and Instagram within three days of the Hamas attack." On 13 October, the EU opened an investigation into X about the spread of disinformation and terrorist content related to the war.

On 14 October, Center for Countering Digital Hate CEO Imran Ahmed said his group was tracking a spike in efforts to push false information about the war, adding that U.S. adversaries, extremists, Internet trolls and engagement farmers were exploiting the war for their own gain. Graham Brookie, senior director of the Atlantic Council's Digital Forensic Research Lab, said that his team had witnessed a surge in terrorist propaganda, graphic content, false or misleading claims and hate speech, with much of the content being circulated on Telegram. An Israel-based company that analyses social media, said that one in five accounts taking part in conversations about Hamas' attacks were fake, adding that they had found approximately 40,000 such accounts on X and TikTok.

According to AP's David Klepper, pictures from the Gaza war have "vividly and painfully illustrated AI's potential as a propaganda tool, used to create lifelike images of carnage... digitally altered ones spread on social media have been used to make false claims about responsibility for casualties or to deceive people about atrocities that never happened."

The New York Times described the start of the Gaza war as releasing a "deluge of online propaganda and disinformation" that was "larger than anything seen before". It described the conflict as "fast becoming a world war online" and stated that Russia, China, Iran and its proxies had used state media and covert influence campaigns on social media networks to support Hamas, undermine Israel, criticize the United States and cause unrest. James Rubin of the U.S. State Department's Global Engagement Center called coverage of the conflict as being swept up in "an undeclared information war with authoritarian countries".

=== X (formerly Twitter) ===
On 9 October, X said there were more than 50 million posts on the platform about the conflict. Elon Musk recommended two accounts that previously promoted a false claim about an explosion near the Pentagon for updates about the war.

On 10 October, researchers found that a network of 67 X accounts was coordinating a campaign of pushing false information about the war. The accounts have been posting near-identical content, sharing false information with both pro-Palestine and pro-Israel narratives.

According to Wired, the community fact-checking system of X, Community Notes, has in some instances contributed to the spread of disinformation instead of correcting it. Wired cited an incident where a video uploaded by Donald Trump Jr. of Hamas shooting at Israelis was inaccurately tagged as a false video from several years ago as an example of the unreliability of Community Notes. Fake accounts pretending to be a BBC journalist and The Jerusalem Post promoted false information about the war prior to X suspending them.

On 12 October, the Tech Transparency Project reported that Hamas was using premium accounts on X to push propaganda. X said it has banned Hamas and removed hundreds of accounts affiliated with Hamas.

On 13 October, on The World radio program, Rebecca Rosman reported that disinformation on X was being monetized by paid-verified users with "new-content" recommendation preference, resulting in millions of views.

According to a report by NewsGuard on 19 October, verified users on X were behind 74% of the 250 most-engaged posts between 7 and 14 October that promoted false or unsubstantiated information about the war. NewsGuard also found that only 79 of the 250 posts were flagged by Community Notes.

On 28 October, commentator Jackson Hinkle posted on X that Haaretz had reported that the Israeli government inflated the death toll for the October 7 attacks. Haaretz stated that Hinkle's post "contain[ed] blatant lies" and was not substantiated by their reporting on the attack. Hinkle also claimed that the image of a Jewish baby burned alive by Hamas on 7 October "was created by artificial intelligence". He was subsequently deplatformed from YouTube.

Syrian YouTuber Maram Susli claimed that footage showed Israeli military helicopters firing on Israelis escaping the 7 October massacre at the supernova festival, carried by Hamas. However, footage resulted to be from Israeli attacks on Hamas positions in Gaza three days later. She also posted a photograph of a woman carrying a child's toy car down the stairs of a largely destroyed building suggesting it was Gaza after Israeli attacks. The picture was actually an award-winning photograph taken in Homs during the Syrian civil war.

An investigation by ProPublica and Columbia University's Tow Center for Digital Journalism found that verified accounts promoting misinformation about the conflict saw their audience grow significantly during the first month of the conflict, and that Community Notes had failed to scale sufficiently, with 80% of the debunked tweets reviewed not being clarified with a note.

=== TikTok ===
On 12 October, the EU warned TikTok about illegal content and disinformation on its platform. On 15 October, TikTok said it had taken action to remove "violative content and accounts". It also said it had established a command center for the conflict, updated its automated detection systems to detect violent content and added moderators who speak Arabic and Hebrew. A TikTok video promoting conspiracy theories that Hamas's attack had been orchestrated by the media was viewed over 300,000 times.

By mid-November 2023, Republican U.S. Representative Mike Gallagher had claimed that TikTok was "intentionally brainwashing" American youth into supporting Hamas, citing the spike in pro-Palestinian content following the outbreak of hostilities between Israel and Hamas. In response to criticism, TikTok issued a press release on 20 November asserting that younger Americans, particularly Millennials and Generation Z, tended to be more sympathetic to the Palestinians than to Israel, citing Gallup polling data dating back to 2010. TikTok also claimed that its algorithm did not take sides but operated in a positive feedback loop based on user engagement. The company also denied favouring "one side of an issue over another" or intentionally promoting pro-Palestinian hashtags such as "#freepalestine," which had attracted 25.5 billion views by 14 November. By comparison, "#standwithisrael" had attracted 440.4 million views. TikTok's press release also stated that it had removed 925,000 videos related to the conflict for violating community standards, including promoting Hamas, had hired moderators fluent in Arabic and Hebrew to parse content, and begun removing fake accounts created in response to the Israel-Hamas conflict.

According to a TheMarker report, neo-Nazi propaganda, antisemitic content, and calls for the destruction of Israel were all circulating on TikTok throughout the war.

=== Telegram ===
The Al-Qassam Brigades, Hamas's military wing, had around 200,000 followers on Telegram at the time of Hamas's attack. According to the Digital Forensic Research Lab, its following has tripled since then, with its posts being viewed over 300,000 times. The Digital Forensic Research Lab found that Hamas relies on Telegram to send statements to its supporters.

According to political analyst and researcher Arieh Kovler, many Israelis follow official-sounding Telegram channels that share out-of-context videos and unverified rumors.

In a statement, Telegram said it was "evaluating the best approaches and... soliciting input from a wide range of third parties" and that it wished to be "careful not to exacerbate the already dire situation by any rush actions".

== Analysis and impact ==
In October 2023, Arma 3 developer Bohemia Interactive said in a statement, "With the tragic events currently unfolding in the Middle East, we feel it is vital to share once again our statement concerning the use of Arma 3 as a source of fake news footage. It's disheartening for us to see the game we all love being used in this way. While we have found ways to tackle this issue somewhat effectively by closely cooperating with leading fact-checking agencies, sadly we can't mitigate it entirely."

In November 2023, Center for Countering Digital Hate CEO Imran Ahmed said that misinformation about the war was as difficult to track as COVID-19 misinformation and misinformation about the 2020 United States presidential election. Propaganda researcher Pekka Kallioniemi stated that COVID-19 vaccines, U.S. support for Ukraine and the Gaza war are "part of the same disinformation package", and that the same people spreading disinformation about COVID-19 and vaccines and about the Russian invasion of Ukraine were spreading pro-Hamas disinformation, citing Jackson Hinkle as an example.

In December 2023, BBC Verify journalist and fact-checker Shayan Sardarizadeh said he had never witnessed a prior conflict "where so much disinformation is posted with the direct intent of dehumanizing real victims of war on both sides. Dead or injured women and children, civilians, hostages, prisoners; no-one is being spared." Muhammad Idrees Ahmad, Director of Journalism at the University of Essex, said that "cynical actors" who were falsely presenting footage from the Syrian civil war as being from the Gaza war "are handing a gift to the Hasbara crowd. The fact that they are posting this out-of-context footage is being used to suggest that all the footage online, including footage of real atrocities in Gaza, is somehow dubious."

In February 2024, Bellingcat founder Eliot Higgins said, "I think the intensity of online discourse around Israel and Palestine is really kind of much worse than I've seen in any of the conflicts. People are not looking to establish the truth in many cases, but basically just look for things to bash each other over the head online. It's really just about people arguing their positions, their opinions, and not really establishing the exact truth around what's happening."

Speaking about Israel's decision not to allow foreign journalists into Gaza, UN secretary-general Antonio Guterres stated, "Denying international journalists entry into Gaza is allowing disinformation and false narratives to flourish." The technology director of the Institute for Strategic Dialogue stated, "The corrosion of the information landscape is undermining the ability of audiences to distinguish truth from falsehood on a terrible scale."

== See also ==
- Denial of the October 7 attacks
- Israeli public diplomacy in the Gaza war
- Media coverage of the Gaza war
- Pallywood
- Disinformation in the Russian invasion of Ukraine
- Propaganda and psychological warfare in the Gaza Wars
- Saddam Hussein's alleged shredder
- Vukovar children massacre, a propaganda story during the Yugoslav Wars about 41 Serb children being killed by Croat soldiers
