= 11th Air Squadron (Indonesia) =

- Skadron Udara 11
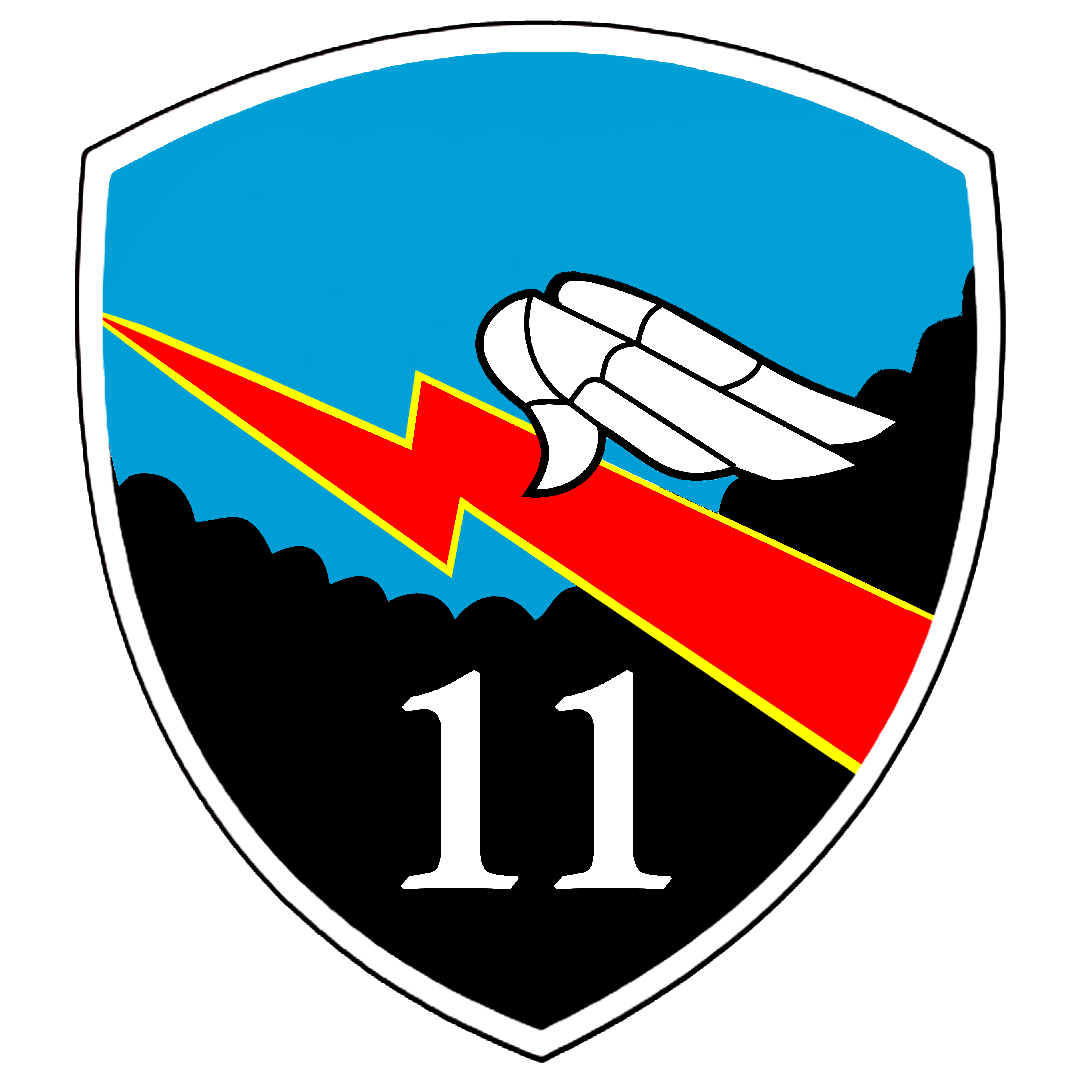
- 11th Air Squadron Badge
- Active: 1 June 1957
- Country: Indonesia
- Branch: Indonesian Air Force
- Type: Fighter
- Part of: 33rd Air Wing
- Garrison/HQ: Sultan Hasanuddin Air Force Base
- Nickname: Thunder
- Mottos: "Bajra Garda Bhuwana" lit. 'Thunder Protector of the Motherland'
- Anniversaries: 1 June
- Equipment: Su-27SKM; Su-30MK2
- Website: tni-au.mil.id/tentang-kami/profilsatuan-detail/skadron-11-lanud-sultan-hasanuddin/1286

Insignia
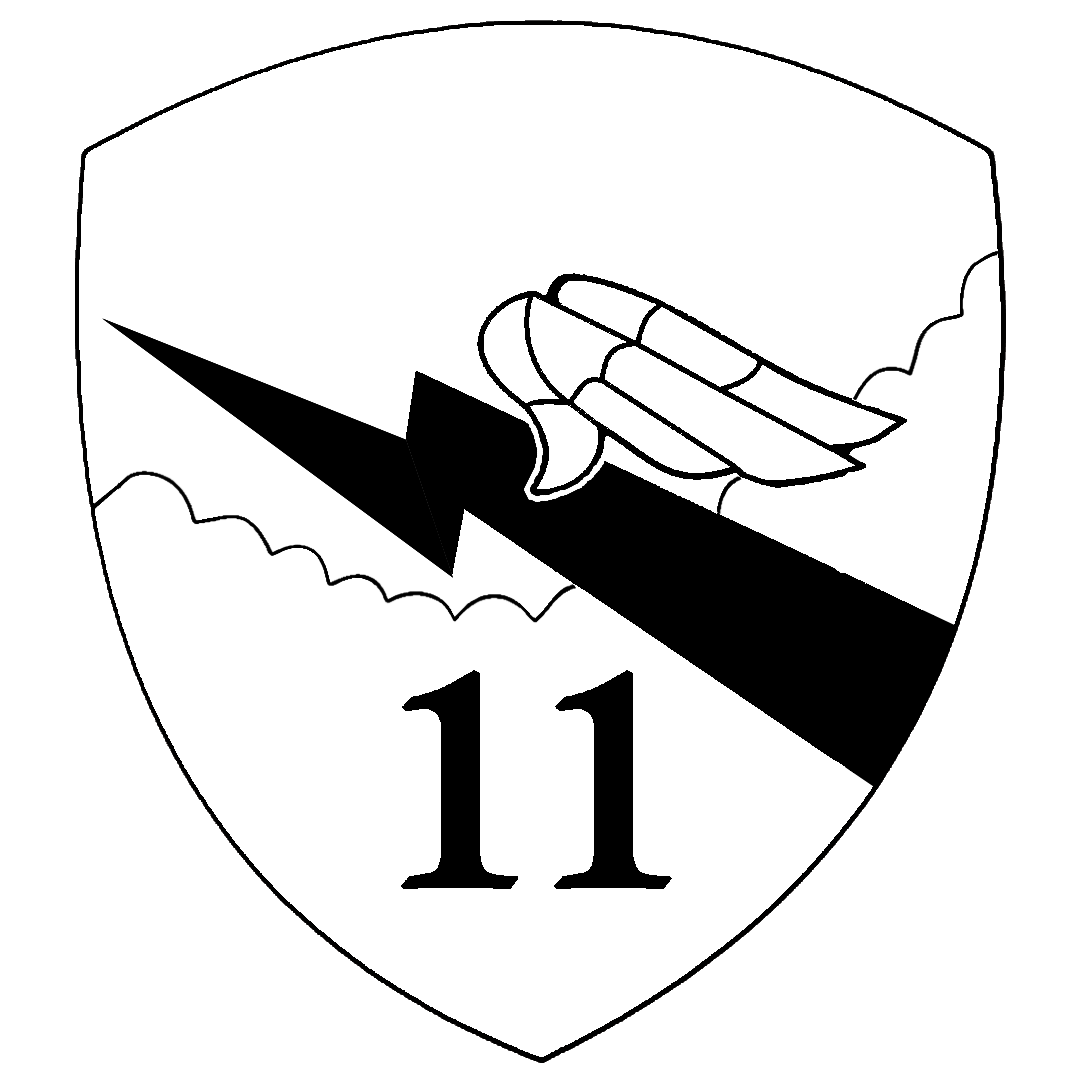
- 11th Air Squadron low visibility Badge

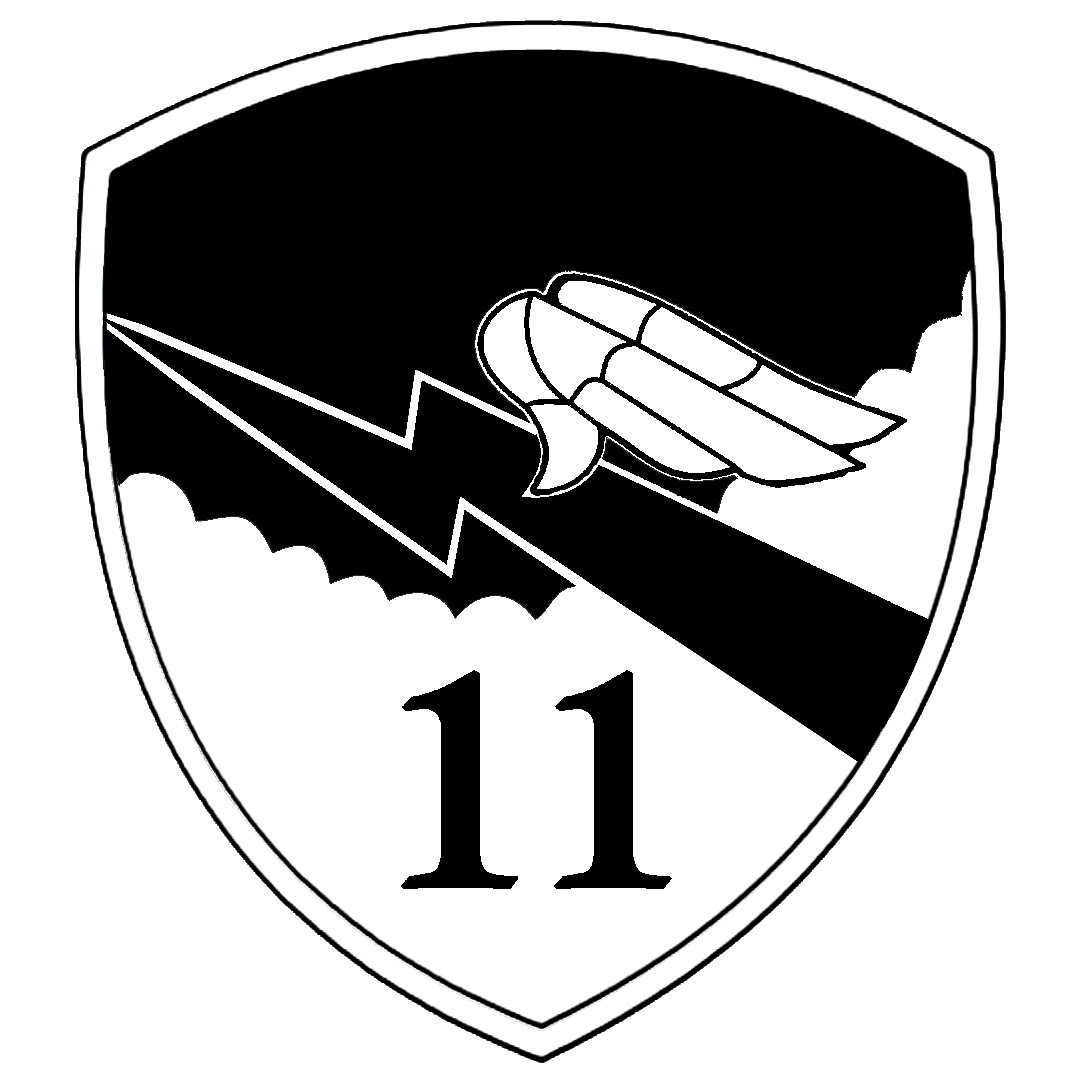
- 11th Air Squadron low visibility Badge (alternative version)

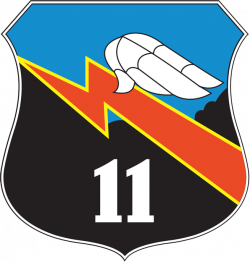
- 11th Air Squadron patch

The 11th Air Squadron (Indonesian: Skadron Udara 11 or Skadud 11 or SkU 11) is a fighter squadron under the 33rd Air Wing at Sultan Hasanuddin Air Force Base, Makassar. Nicknamed the "Thunder" group, it was established on 1 June 1957 at Andir Air Force Base, Bandung, as the first jet fighter squadron of the Indonesian Air Force. The squadron has operated various aircraft, including the De Havilland Vampire (its first jet), MiG-15 and MiG-17, Douglas A-4 Skyhawk, and currently the Sukhoi Su-27 and Su-30. It was liquidated in 1974 due to a lack of serviceable aircraft but was reactivated on 5 October 1980 after receiving A-4 Skyhawks through the clandestine Operation Alpha. The squadron has supported operations against the RMS and Permesta rebellions, as well as Operation Trikora and Operation Dwikora.

== History ==
The squadron's origins trace to 1955, when pilots and technicians were sent to England to train on the Vampire, Indonesia's first jet. These aircraft formed the Gas Powered Unit (KPG) at Andir in 1956, which became Skadron Udara 11 on 1 June 1957.

In 1958, the squadron received MiG-15 and MiG-17 jets from the Soviet Bloc and saw combat against Permesta rebels. It also participated in Operation Trikora in 1962. Due to an embargo on Soviet spare parts, the MiG fleet was grounded and the squadron was liquidated on 4 March 1974.

In 1980, the squadron was reactivated as part of Operation Alpha, receiving 16 ex-Israeli A-4 Skyhawks. The first four aircraft arrived at Tanjung Priok on 6 May 1980, crated and disguised as F-5s. Pilots and technicians had undergone secret training in Israel. The squadron was officially re-established on 5 October 1980. It moved to Makassar in 1989 and began re-equipping with Sukhoi Su-27 and Su-30 fighters from 2003. As of 2025, the squadron remains operational with the Sukhoi fleet, conducting air defense missions over eastern Indonesia.

== Emblem ==
=== History ===
In 1959, Air Lieutenant Leo Wattimena, as Squadron Commander, held a competition to design a squadron emblem. The competition was won by the late Warrant Officer First Class Kayado, who created the emblem as it appears today. This emblem was officially used for the first time on 8 August 1962, at Kemayoran Air Force Base.

=== Meaning ===
Shield Shape

This signifies that the 11th Air Squadron is the protector/shield of the nation and state from all enemies.

8 White Wings

This symbolizes that the 11th Air Squadron's first air power consisted of eight Vampire aircraft, used for the noble task of protecting Indonesia's airspace.

Black Clouds and 11 Blue Curves

This symbolizes that 11th Air Squadron must endure both good and bad circumstances in carrying out its duties.

Red Lightning

This symbolizes that the 11th Air Squadron has high-speed aircraft, brave pilots and is capable of flying in good or bad weather.

== Thunder Group ==
Thunder was the name given to the fighter pilots of 11th Air Squadron since the introduction of the Lockheed T-33 Thunderbird. The Thunder number represents the order in which a fighter pilot joins 11th Air Squadron. By agreement, Thunder 13 was vacated. By 2003, there were 132 fighter pilots with the Thunder designation.

== Bibliography ==
- Gelegar Guntur Nusantara : Skadron Udara 11 Dari Masa ke Masa [The Roar of the Archipelago's Thunder: Air Squadron 11 Through the Ages] (in Indonesian). 2003.
- Sutisna, Yuyu (2002). Kepak Sayap Skadron Udara 14 "1962-2002" : Tentara Langit, Pahlawan Hati (in Indonesian). Jakarta.
