= Propaganda and psychological warfare in the Gaza Wars =

Propaganda and psychological warfare have been asserted to have been used extensively by both Hamas and Israel during the course of the 2008–2009 Gaza War, the 2014 Gaza War and the Gaza war from 2023 to 2025.

== By Hamas ==
=== 2008-09 war ===
Before and during the conflict, Hamas' senior representatives released number of statements designed to avert Israeli decision-makers from launching any military operation in Gaza and to cause demoralization among Israelis. Before the end of the pre-conflict ceasefire, Hamas boasted that it had countless surprises awaiting Israeli troops, should they advance. Hamas representatives threatened on several occasions to abduct Israeli soldiers, and during the ground invasion tried to spread rumors that it actually had captured or killed more Israeli soldiers.

On a video broadcast on Al-Aqsa TV on January 10, showing the names of Israeli towns hit by rockets, it was implied Tel-Aviv is the next target and that 'all options are open'. Also, Hamas sent messages in Hebrew to Israeli citizens' mobile phones warning: "Rockets on all cities, shelters will not protect you."

Hamas instrumentalized the abducted Israeli soldier Gilad Shalit as a form of psychological weapon, declaring that he had been wounded by Israeli fire, later announcing that his condition was no longer of interest to them.

According to IDF spokesman, Hamas' ruses in the battlefield included booby traps throughout Gaza's neighborhoods, such as mannequins placed at apartment entrances and rigged to explode when the soldiers approach.

Arab television stations reported Hamas-provided statistics for Israeli casualties on the assumption that Israel is distorting its own figures of soldiers killed and wounded.

A study by the Center for Strategic and International Studies notes that Hamas propaganda both rejected Hamas responsibility for the fighting and used it to attack the Palestinian Authority.

Dr. Tal Pavel from Israeli think-tank International Policy Institute for Counter-Terrorism (ICT) said that Hamas uses its Web sites to make comparisons between Israel and Nazi Germany, portraying Israel as a destructive, oppressive regime afraid of Hamas rockets raining on Tel Aviv.

== By Israel ==
=== 2008-09 war ===
The day before the beginning of the offensive on December 27, 2009, the Israeli Defense Force (IDF) pulled troops back from the border and used its radio channels to broadcast talk of a "lull" in order to achieve a disinformation coup ("con") to lure Hamas fighters out of hiding.

A broadcaster in Islamic Jihad's Voice of Jerusalem radio station in Gaza City reported that IDF have been breaking into his station signal "least once an hour" during conflict intensification to broadcast messages to Gaza population that their problems were due to Hamas. The army also dropped leaflets with similar messages and contact info to report about the whereabouts of militant leaders and weapons caches. The leaflets also noted that "the Israeli army will respond if the rocket fire continues." In war zones, leaflets warned local residents that they had to flee. It also warned residents that their homes would be targeted if they were located in an area of possible target. Dr. Yaniv Levitan of the University of Haifa said that the aim of the flyers was not to demoralize the civil population, but to implant recognition in hearts and minds that Hamas has failed, that there is an option of choosing another path.

IDF spokespersons often reported that scores of demoralized Hamas fighters had been observed deserting. This strengthened the Israeli will to continue and undermined the confidence in Hamas in Gaza.

There was a mistrust of phone calls warning messages to people that they have "just minutes to evacuate before they bomb the house." According to a human rights lawyer at the Palestinian Center for Human Rights (PCHR), despite the hundreds of phone calls to families warning their house is about to be blown up, only 37 were destroyed, presumably as of the January 3 date.

=== 2023-25 war ===
In August 2025, Xaviaer DuRousseau, Brooke Goldstein and other American and Israeli social media influencers went on a paid trip to Gaza by Israel's diaspora affairs ministry to film and share content from GHF distribution sites. Israel repeatedly claimed that there is no famine in Gaza and accused Hamas of stealing humanitarian aid in order to justify the blockade of humanitarian aid to Gaza. DuRousseau stated on Twitter, "There is enough food at this aid base to feed every person in Gaza for at least a week, but the UN, Hamas, etc refuse to distribute the food efficiently. Instead, it sits here to spoil and be stolen. How’s that Israel’s fault?".

Israel's +972 Magazine reported that the Israeli army created a special unit known as the "legitimization cell" to link Palestinian journalists to Hamas in order to justify their killings.

Israel was accused of spreading atrocity propaganda to justify its invasion of the Gaza Strip. The alleged propaganda included claims of systematic rape (such as a New York Times piece titled Screams Without Words) and of babies being beheaded and burned.

In September 2025, the Quincy Institute for Responsible Statecraft published an article about how Israel is paying American social media influencers around $7,000 per post to promote pro-Israel content on platforms like TikTok and Instagram. Documents filed under the Foreign Agents Registration Act also revealed that Bridge Growth Partners, a Washington D.C.–based firm working for the Ministry of Foreign Affairs, received $900,000 for an "Influencer Campaign" running from June to November 2025. The campaign involves 14 to 18 influencers expected to produce 75 to 90 posts, averaging between $6,100 and $7,300 per post after accounting for production and administrative costs.

== See also ==
- Misinformation in the Gaza war
- Hamas most wanted playing cards
- Accusation in a mirror
