= Indonesia–Israel relations =

- Indonesia: Israel

Indonesia and Israel have no formal diplomatic ties due to the indirect tensions resulting from the decades-long Israeli–Palestinian conflict, although they maintain quiet trade, tourism, and security contacts. In 2012, Indonesia spoke of upgrading relations with Israel and opening a consulate in Ramallah, but this agreement was never implemented.

Relations between the two countries have worsened since the 2023 Gaza war, especially when Israel attacked and occupied an Indonesian hospital in Gaza. It was reported that this increased Indonesia's support for Palestine.

As Indonesia is working towards accession to the Organization for Economic Co-operation and Development (OECD), Israeli media reported in 2024 that Indonesia has committed to establishing diplomatic ties with Israel for the first time. The OECD Secretary-General, Mathias Cormann, confirmed that Indonesia must establish diplomatic relations with all OECD member countries before any decision on its admission to the OECD is made. However, the Indonesian government denied reports of any plan to develop diplomatic ties with Israel before any two-state solution is made and confirmed its support for Palestine's independence.

== History ==
=== Old Order (1945–1967) ===
In December 1949, shortly after the Dutch government signed the transfer of sovereignty to Indonesia, President Israel Chaim Weizmann and Prime Minister David Ben-Gurion sent telegrams to President Indonesia Sukarno and Foreign Minister (later Vice President) Mohammad Hatta. They conveyed their congratulations. In January 1950, Foreign Minister Israel Moshe Sharett sent a telegram to Hatta, informing him that Israel had decided to grant full recognition to Indonesia.

“Hatta responded to Sharett and Ben-Gurion’s gesture with thanks, but offered no reciprocal diplomatic recognition,” wrote Colin Rubenstein, executive director of the Australia/Israel and Jewish Affairs Council (AIJAC), in “Indonesia And Israel: A Relationship In Waiting,” published in the Jewish Political Studies Review, March 2005.

Feeling that his response was unrequited, Sharett wrote again regarding the plan to send a goodwill mission to Indonesia. In a reply letter sent in May 1950, Hatta suggested that the mission be postponed indefinitely. Indonesia’s reluctance to engage with Israel continued. In June 1952, the Antara news agency reported that the Indonesian government had no intention of recognizing Israel. This news was picked up by the press in Arab countries and Pakistan.

"The reason is that the majority of Indonesia's population is Muslim and because Arab countries had supported Indonesia during its struggle for independence," Rubenstein wrote.

In 1953, Sukarno began to propose a conference of Asian and African countries to be held in Indonesia. At a meeting of prospective participants, countries such as Burma, India, and Sri Lanka supported Israel's inclusion. However, Indonesia, along with Pakistan, steadfastly opposed the proposal. Ultimately, when the Asian-African Conference was held in April 1955, Israel did not participate. In 1957, when the Indonesian national team qualified for the Asian zone and faced Israel to qualify for the 1958 World Cup in Sweden, Indonesia refused to play in Jakarta or Tel Aviv, the capital of Israel. Indonesia only wanted to play at a neutral venue, but this was rejected by the International Federation of Football Associations (FIFA). Indonesia withdrew. Not only that, Sukarno even loudly opposed Israel's participation in the 1962 Asian Games in Jakarta.

=== New Order (1967–1998) ===
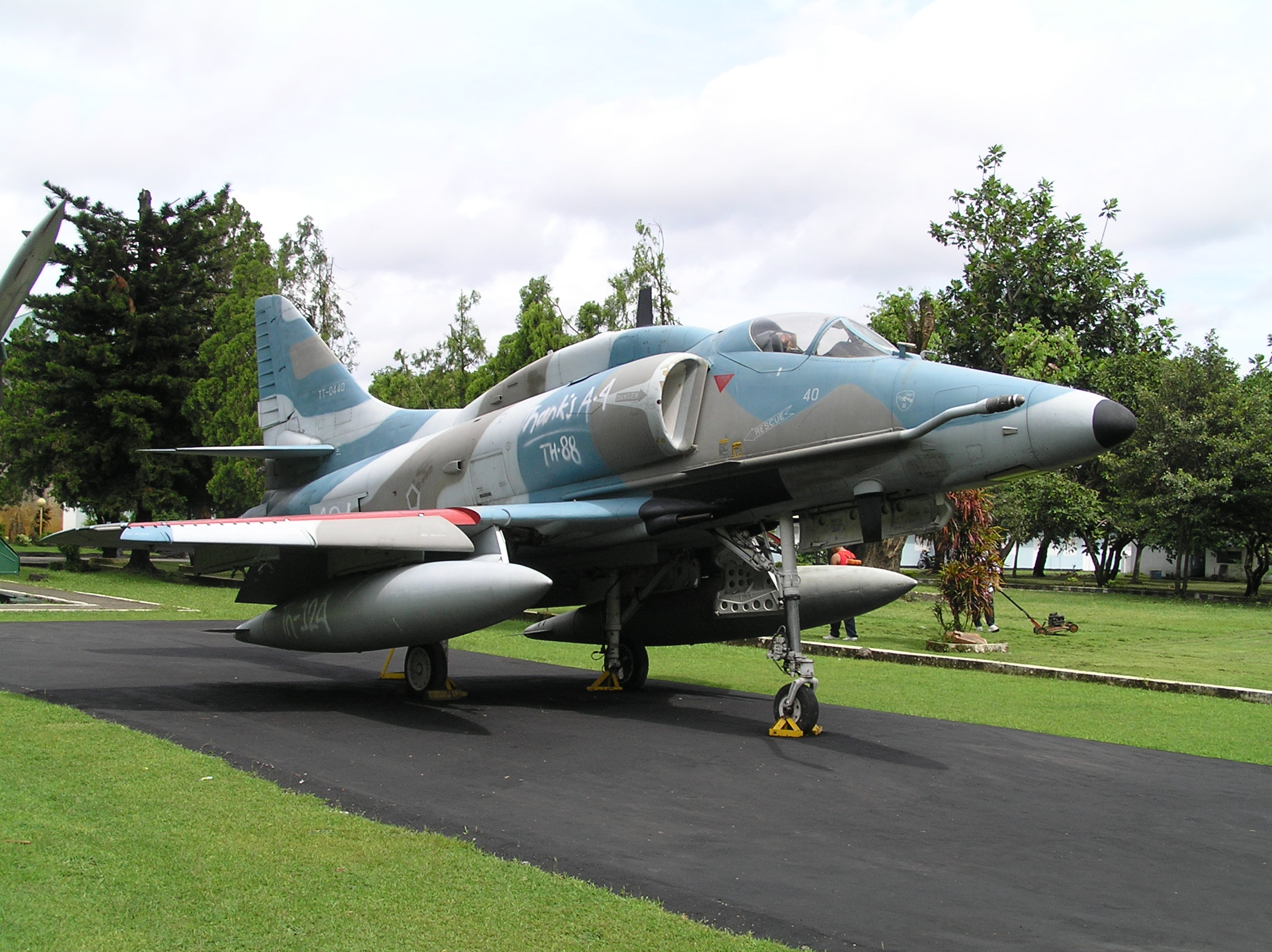
Indonesia purchased over 30 Douglas A-4 Skyhawks from Israel in the early 1980s, despite no recognition or diplomatic relations.

However, with the transition to the New Order and the inauguration of General Suharto as president, military and intelligence relations between the two countries opened up through unofficial channels, primarily through Iran and Turkey.

In 1971, Indonesian and Israeli military officers are believed to have started negotiations on transfer of military hardware and sharing of intelligence on global communist terrorist groups. In November the following year, some counter-battery radars for accurate artillery fire were bought by the Indonesian military from the Israel Military Industries. In March 1974, a team of 27 officers and 90 soldiers from the Indonesian Army were sent to study a 2-month course to Israel on artillery radar and land surveillance, as well as ELINT and SIGINT from the Israeli Defence Forces. In January 1975, the Indonesian Navy and Indonesian Air Force sent a 60-man team to Israel to learn special insertion and covert operations from Shayetet 13 and the Israeli Navy. This resulted in the establishment of the Special Forces Training School to train small Kopassus units in air and naval infiltration. In August 1976, Indonesian and Israeli Chiefs of Air Staff met during a supposedly coincidental visit to Tehran to discuss the Indonesian procurement of 35 Douglas A-4 Skyhawk fighter aircraft from Israel, which were ultimately delivered in 1981–82 under Operation Alpha. Indonesia is also interested in Israeli-made drones, especially the IAI Searcher and IAI Heron drones. Four Searcher UAVs have been delivered through Philippines Kital Group, with Heron UAV still in consideration. Searcher drones leased from Singapore also assisted Indonesian army in Operation Tinombala.

In 1993, Prime Minister of Israel Yitzhak Rabin met Indonesian president Suharto at his private residence in Jakarta. This, what press said was Rabin's unscheduled visit, happened during Suharto's chairmanship of the Non-Aligned Movement and shortly after the Oslo Accords. This was the first ever high-profile meeting between both leaders.

=== Reformation era (1998–present) ===
In 1999, after entering the Reformation era, Indonesian president Abdurrahman Wahid and Foreign Minister Alwi Shihab mentioned their wishes to open ties with Israel although only at the level of economic and trade links. Wahid believed that Indonesia has no reason to be against Israel. He pointed to the fact that Indonesia has "long-term relationships" with China and the Soviet Union, two countries he viewed as having atheism as part of their constitutions, and further explained that Israel "has a reputation as a nation with a high regard for God and religion" However, after Wahid's removal from office in 2001, no effort was maintained to improve the relations between Indonesia and Israel.

==== SBY presidency (2004–2014) ====
In 2005, Indonesia said that establishing full diplomatic ties with Israel will only be possible after peace has been reached between Israel and Palestine. Israeli Foreign Minister Silvan Shalom held a discreet first meeting with his Indonesian counterpart Hassan Wirajuda during a UN summit in New York City in September 2005. However, President of Indonesia Susilo Bambang Yudhoyono ruled out establishing formal diplomatic ties but said: "Any communication between Indonesian and Israeli officials will be oriented to the objective of assisting the Palestinian people in gaining their independence".

In 2006, Indonesia and several Islamic groups in the country condemned Israel's ongoing military operation in Gaza and demanded the release of arrested Palestinian officials, and also called on Israel to withdraw its forces from Lebanon during the 2006 Lebanon War. The Indonesian Foreign Ministry advised that the national tennis team was pulling out of its Fed Cup matches in Israel, saying "We are witnessing a military invasion by Israel and the arrest of scores of Palestinian officials...It is now impossible to play there".

In a visit to Singapore in 2006, the Israeli Arab diplomat Ali Yahya called for direct ties between Israel and Indonesia. In an interview with The Jakarta Post he said,

I misunderstand why the relationship between the majorities of Muslims in Asia is hostile to Israel. If it is because of Israel and Palestine, then (how can it be reconciled that) we have peace with Jordan, Egypt, Morocco, but not with eastern Asia?

We protect the holy places in Israel, respect the Arabic language, and bring imams and rabbis together to have discussions. I am posing a question if the Muslim countries in Asia can open the gate to their country for us, so that we can open up relations with them.

There are so many opportunities in Israel and by stressing the need for cooperation we would like to get these countries to also have a share of these opportunities. But to do that, we need to have the opportunity to talk directly to these countries, which I hope, will come up soon.

In 2008, the Jakarta Post printed a letter from Israeli Deputy Minister of Foreign Affairs, Majalli Wahabi, urging Indonesia to take a role in advocating for peace in the Middle East. Analysts suggested that the printing of the letter might be a signal of a thaw between the two nations. However, the Gaza War that lasted from late 27 December 2008 to 18 January 2009 affected relations. Indonesia harshly condemned Israeli actions, labeling it as "aggression", and expressed its support of the Palestinians.

==== Jokowi presidency (2014–2024) ====
In March 2016, Israeli Prime Minister Benjamin Netanyahu called for normalization of ties with Indonesia, citing "many opportunities for bilateral cooperation" and adding that reasons preventing relationship between the two countries were no longer relevant. However, Indonesia refused, stating that it would only consider normalization if Palestinian independence is fulfilled.

In 2018, member of Presidential Advisory Council Yahya Cholil Staquf visited Israel to meet Benjamin Netanyahu and joined a Jewish Forum, which was responded negatively by the Indonesian public.

Indonesia criticized Israel's actions during the 2021 Israel–Palestine crisis, and together with Malaysia and Brunei urged the United Nations to end "the atrocities carried out against the Palestinian people". In June, Sagi Karni, Israel's ambassador to Singapore, said that Israel would be willing to establish diplomatic relations with southeast Asia's Muslim-majority countries, including Indonesia: "We are willing to talk, we are willing to meet, and the door is open as far as we are concerned. I don't think it's so difficult to find us."

In 2023, Israeli Olympic shooter Sergy Rikhter withdrew from international competition in Jakarta after the International Shooting Sport Federation (ISSF) refused to allow him to compete with any symbols representing Rikhter's home country of Israel. In order to qualify for the 2024 Summer Olympics in Paris, athletes are required to have participated in at least two ISSF Championships during the Qualifying period, reach a Minimum Qualifying Score (MQS), and secure a place in one of five quotas within a series of four World Cup meets, of which Jakarta is the first in this cycle. Richter won gold for Shooting at the 2019 European Games in 10 metre air rifle and competed in Tokyo Shooting at the 2020 Summer Olympics – Men's 10 metre air rifle. Reportedly, World Cup organizers informed Richter and the Israeli federation they would only allow him to participate with his weapon if he competes with identification symbols of the ISSF or the flag of the International Olympic Committee. Richter rebuffed the ISSF and chose not to compete in the World Cup, in part stating,

I will never accept to participate in a competition without the [IOC Country Code] ISR on my competition suit, on my personal rifle and on the results screen...I start the most important year on the way to Paris, when my opponents take a professional advantage over me due to political problems. If the Olympic movement, which advocates the existence of sports without distinctions of nationality, religion, race and sex, does not support its ideology, then what is its value? I don't understand how the state is allowed to organize some sort of competition with a national identity restriction.

On 29 March 2023, FIFA announced that Indonesia would lose its right to host the 2023 FIFA U-20 World Cup and a new country be selected instead. This is because of controversy over Israel's participation in the competition in Indonesia, which does not officially recognize Israel as a sovereign state.

Following the October 7 attacks, Indonesia condemned Israel's bombing campaign against the Gaza strip. Specifically, Foreign Minister Retno Marsudi issued the "harshest of condemnations" towards Israel's assault on the Indonesian Hospital in Gaza. As part of a delegation of OIC countries, agreed to during an emergency session of the Islamic Summit Conference, Marsudi visited China and Russia, both Permanent Members of the UNSC, in an effort to garner support for a ceasefire. In Moscow, Marsudi stated that Israel's claim of self-defensive action, through its combined air- and ground assault, is inexcusable; "Israel, a colonialist, cannot use such an excuse" [ sic ]. Marsudi iterates that, even if it were a valid excuse, self-defensive action is not "a licence to kill civilian"[sic]. She stated that her goal was to formulate peace through the implementation of a two-state solution.

UN Security Council held an open debate on the Gaza war in New York on 23 January 2024. Indonesian Foreign Minister Retno Marsudi left the room when Israel's Permanent Representative to the UN Gilad Erdan spoke to the organization's security agency.

The UN Security Council held an open debate on the Gaza war in New York on Tuesday local time. In Erdan's turn, Retno—along with other members of the Organization of Islamic Cooperation (OKI)—decided to walk out. "Minister Retno and the heads of delegations from other countries left the room when Israel's permanent representative gave his statement," said Foreign Ministry spokesman Muhammad Iqbal, Thursday. However, Erdan was also not present when Indonesia and other OIC members delivered their statements, according to so. In her speech, Retno criticized Israeli Prime Minister Benjamin Netanyahu's recent statement that he would not allow a Palestinian state to exist. "Indonesia strongly rejects this statement," said Retno in the UNSC debate. “This statement is unacceptable. This confirms Israel's ultimate goal of erasing Palestine from the world map. Will the council remain silent in the face of such intentions?” said Retno. According to Retno, Israel must be held accountable for its atrocities in Gaza.

==== Prabowo presidency (2024–present) ====
In June 2024, President-elect of the Republic of Indonesia for the period 2024–2029, Prabowo Subianto, expressed his support for the two-state solution to resolve the Palestinian conflict, and said he was ready to send peacekeeping troops to the Gaza region. Prabowo made this statement at the International Institute for Strategic Studies (IISS) Shangri-La Dialogue 2024 forum in Singapore. Responding to Prabowo's statement, the TNI stated that it was ready to implement it. Head of the TNI Information Center, Major General Nugraha Gumilar, ensured that TNI soldiers were ready to carry out peace operations under the United Nations (UN) wherever there was an order from the state. "For Indonesia, the pursuit of peace, security, stability and prosperity is the main foundation of our international engagement. We believe that only through dialogue and cooperation can we achieve these goals," said Prabowo.

He considers collaboration to be the only way to create prosperity and harmony in the world. Therefore, he ensured that Indonesia was strongly committed to inviting various countries to collaborate and establish dialogue in achieving common interests. Prabowo also ensured that the Indonesian government would also encourage the world to uphold international law, especially in the aspect of respecting each country's national sovereignty and territorial integrity as mandated by the UN Charter. He also highlighted specifically the conflict in Gaza. In particular, Israel's actions in attacking civilians who were taking refuge in Rafah. According to him, this action must be immediately investigated because it has victimized children, women and unarmed citizens. "This heartbreaking incident encourages us to immediately call for a thorough investigation into this humanitarian disaster," stressed Prabowo. "We believe that along with many other countries in the world today, the only real solution for lasting peace and security for Israel and Palestine is a two-state solution," he said.

On 28 May 2025, during a conversation with French President Emmanuel Macron in Jakarta, Indonesian President Prabowo Subianto once again expressed that he would be willing to establish diplomatic relations with Israel if the country acknowledged the Palestinian state.

On 31 July 2025, Indonesia signed the New York Declaration backed by France and Saudi Arabia in the UN Headquarters in New York, supporting Hamas relinquishing its rule over Gaza, the return of all Israeli hostages, the release of Palestinian prisoners, the withdrawal of Israeli troops from Gaza and support to the two-state solution.

On 24 September 2025, President Prabowo Subianto, declared during a speech at the UNGA, "we must also recognize and guarantee the safety and security of Israel". On 13 October 2025, it was reported in Israeli media that Subianto was scheduled to make his first official visit to Israel the following day. Reports that Subianto would travel to Israel were subsequently denied by Foreign Minister Sugiono.

== Agreements ==
In 2008, Indonesia signed a medical cooperation agreement with Israel's national emergency medical service worth US$200,000.

According to the report from The Times of Israel in 2012, Indonesia agreed to informally upgrade its relations with Israel and to open a consulate in Ramallah, headed by a diplomat with the rank of ambassador, who also would have unofficially served as his country's ambassador for contacts with Israel. The move, which had been agreed upon after five years of sensitive deliberations, would have represented a de facto upgrading of relations between the two countries. Indonesia had formally presented the move to open a West Bank consulate as a demonstration of its support for Palestinian independence. In fact, while the ambassador-ranked diplomat was supposed to be accredited to the Palestinian Authority or Palestine Liberation Organization, a significant portion of his work would have been in dealings with Israel, and the office would have fulfilled substantial diplomatic duties as well as consular responsibilities. After Israel denied the Indonesian foreign minister entry to Ramallah in 2012, Indonesia backed out from the agreement and the consulate in Ramallah was not opened. Despite the absence of formal diplomatic relations, Israel and Indonesia quietly maintain trade, security and other relations which, however have been quietly deteriorating ever since the Middle East Peace Process has been stalled.

Indonesian exports to Israel was valued at $187 million as of 2022, with palm oil being highest valued product. Meanwhile, Israeli exports to Indonesia stood at $68.5 million as of 2022. The Economist reported that Indonesia purchased Israeli tech and weaponry, and before the Gaza war, carried out secret talks with Israel that would see trade offices established in both countries.

In May 2024, a joint investigation by Haaretz, Amnesty International, and Tempo, reported that Indonesia imported spying and surveillance technologies from Israel. Amnesty's reported that the technology is "highly invasive spyware tools are designed to be covert and to leave minimal traces...this built-in secrecy can make it exceedingly difficult to detect cases of unlawful misuse of these tools against civil society, and risks creating impunity-by-design for rights violations."

=== Tourism and travel ===
Israeli citizens are eligible for visas to Indonesia for single entry group tourist travel and single entry business travel. For Indonesians, tourist visas to Israel are only available for group travel through travel agencies. In May 2018, Indonesia barred Israeli passport holders from entering the country, which Israel reciprocated, although not for all types of visas. A month later, both countries reversed their tourism bans. In 2018, 35.3 thousand Indonesian tourists visited Israel. A year later, there were 38.7 thousand Indonesians who visited Israel.

== Public opinion ==
According to a 2025 Pew Research Center survey, 17% of people in Indonesia had a favorable view of Israel, while 80% had an unfavorable view; 19% had confidence in Israeli Prime Minister Benjamin Netanyahu, while 76% did not.

== See also ==
- Indonesia–Palestine relations
- History of the Jews in Indonesia
- Operation Alpha
