= Removal of Indonesia as 2023 FIFA U-20 World Cup hosts =

Political controversy over the 2023 FIFA U-20 World Cup in Indonesia

- Locations where matches were to be played at
- Native name: Piala Dunia U-20 2023 Indonesia
- Date: 30 March 2023
- Venue: Various venues in Indonesia
- Location: Indonesia
- Also known as: Piala Dunia U-20
- Cause: Indonesia's opposition to Israel's participation in the tournament
- Outcome: FIFA revokes Indonesia's hosting rights and imposes a financial sanction on the Indonesian Football Association

The removal of Indonesia as 2023 FIFA U-20 World Cup hosts was a political controversy that occurred in March 2023, when FIFA, the world governing body of association football, decided to strip Indonesia of its hosting rights for the 2023 FIFA U-20 World Cup, a youth football tournament that was scheduled to take place in May 2023. The decision was made due to the "current circumstances" that arose from Indonesia's opposition to Israel's participation in the tournament, citing Indonesia's pro-Palestine stance and lack of diplomatic ties with Israel. FIFA also imposed a financial sanction on the Football Association of Indonesia (PSSI) for breaching its obligations as a host country. The decision was met with disappointment and anger by many Indonesian football fans and players, who had hoped to showcase their country's passion and potential for the sport. Indonesia returned to hosting for the 2023 FIFA U-17 World Cup after Peru pulled out of hosting the event.

== Background ==
Indonesia was awarded the hosting rights for the 2023 FIFA U-20 World Cup in October 2019, beating bids from Brazil, Peru, and a joint bid from Myanmar and Thailand. It was the first time that Indonesia would host a FIFA tournament, and the second time that Southeast Asia would host the U-20 World Cup, after Malaysia in 1997. The tournament was originally scheduled to take place from 20 May to 12 June 2021, but was postponed to May 2023 due to the COVID-19 pandemic.

Indonesia planned to use six venues across six provinces for the tournament, namely: Kapten I Wayan Dipta Stadium in Gianyar Regency; Gelora Bung Karno Stadium in Jakarta; Jalak Harupat Stadium in Bandung; Gelora Bung Tomo Stadium in Surabaya; Gelora Sriwijaya Stadium in Palembang; Manahan Stadium in Surakarta. The stadiums were originally scheduled to be completed by December 2020, but were delayed due to the COVID-19 pandemic.

The following were the host cities and stadiums selected originally for the tournament before Indonesia's removal as hosts:

Jakarta	Surabaya	Bandung
Gelora Bung Karno Stadium	Gelora Bung Tomo Stadium	Jalak Harupat Stadium
Capacity: 77,193	Capacity: 45,134	Capacity: 30,100
Location of the stadiums of the 2023 FIFA U-20 World Cup (Indonesia)
Palembang	Surakarta	Gianyar
Gelora Sriwijaya Stadium	Manahan Stadium	Kapten I Wayan Dipta Stadium
Capacity: 23,000	Capacity: 20,000	Capacity: 18,000

== Controversy ==
The controversy over Israel’s participation in the tournament emerged when Israel qualified as one of the five representatives of UEFA, the European football confederation, after finishing second in their group at the 2022 UEFA European Under-19 Championship. Indonesia, which has the largest Muslim population in the world and does not have formal diplomatic relations with Israel, has been a vocal supporter of Palestinian independence and has often criticized Israel’s policies and actions in the region. The issue sparked protests and statements from various local officials and groups in Indonesia, who called for the banning of Israel from the tournament or the withdrawal of Indonesia as the host. Some of them cited the preamble to the Indonesia’s constitution, which states that “the independence is a genuine right of all nations and any form of alien occupation should thus be erased from the earth as not in conformity with humanity and justice”.

== FIFA sanctions ==
After Indonesia lost its hosting rights for the U-20 World Cup, FIFA also imposed a provisional restriction on the use of FIFA Forward development funds for PSSI. FIFA Forward is a program that provides financial and technical support for soccer development projects in each member association and confederation. FIFA said it would review the sanction after evaluating Indonesia’s plan to improve its football.

PSSI chief Erick Thohir said the sanction would affect PSSI's operational needs and reiterated President Joko Widodo’s instruction to transform the sport, including renovating over 20 stadiums. He also said Indonesia could avoid a more severe penalty of being banned from world soccer and that this was more like a yellow card than a red card.

The cancellation of the Under-20 World Cup caused anger and disappointment among fans and players in Indonesia. FIFA made the decision after PSSI canceled the draw because the governor of Bali refused to host Israel’s team. In March, protesters marched in Jakarta waving Indonesian and Palestinian flags, stating that Israel should not be allowed to participate.

== Opposition to Israel’s participation ==
Several groups and individuals in Indonesia expressed their opposition to Israel’s participation in the FIFA U-20 World Cup, which was originally scheduled to be held in Indonesia from May 20 to June 11, 2023. Indonesia, a Muslim-majority nation of more than 270 million people, does not have formal diplomatic relations with Israel and supports the cause of the Palestinians.

=== Bali governor’s request ===
One of the main sources of opposition came from I Wayan Koster, the governor of Bali, one of the six host provinces for the tournament. Koster sent a letter to Indonesia’s sports ministry in early March 2023, requesting that Israel be banned from competing in Bali. He cited the "humanitarian tragedy" in Palestine and the "violation of human rights" by Israel as reasons for his objection. Koster also stated that the provincial government of Bali refused to allow the Israeli team to play in Bali. His letter sparked a crisis for the Indonesian government, as FIFA postponed the official draw for the tournament, which was supposed to take place in Bali on March 29.

=== Public protests ===
Koster’s request was supported by some conservative Muslim groups and activists, who staged protests in Indonesia’s capital Jakarta on March 20 and March 29. They carried signs and chanted slogans demanding that the government prevent Israel from participating in the tournament. They also accused FIFA of being biased and unfair in allowing Israel to qualify for the first time. Some protesters also burned Israeli flags.

=== Government response ===
President Joko Widodo addressed the nation on March 28, reiterating Indonesia’s support for the Palestinians but also stressing the country’s obligation to follow FIFA regulations. He said that Indonesia had gone through a long bidding process to host the tournament and that it was an honor for the Indonesian people. He also urged Indonesians to respect the spirit of sportsmanship and not mix politics with sports. However, his appeal failed to convince FIFA, which announced on March 29 that it had removed Indonesia as the host of the tournament due to the current circumstances. FIFA also said that sanctions against PSSI were possible.

Governors who opposed Israel's participation in the tournament:

Name	Image	Title	Opposition
I Wayan Koster		Governor of Bali	Requested the sports ministry to ban Israel from playing in Bali; refused to allow the Israeli team to compete in Bali; cited humanitarian and human rights reasons
Ganjar Pranowo		Governor of Central Java	Requested the sports ministry to ban Israel from playing in Central Java; cited Indonesian Minister of Foreign Affairs' Rule No.3 Year 2019, a regulation about regional governments' involvement in foreign relations, as the basis for his opposition

== Aftermath ==
As the result of the boycott, FIFA imposed sanctions on Indonesia after the chaos in canceling holding the 2023 U-20 World Cup. Indonesia received sanctions in the form of freezing FIFA Forward funds. The tournament itself is moved to Argentina after FIFA revoked Indonesia's host status. The host switch was welcomed by the Israeli U-20 team coach Ofir Haim, who states that "we will attend to represent Israel with honor". Three months after the cancellation of FIFA U-20 World Cup, Indonesia also withdrew from hosting the World Beach Games, citing budget reasons. However many suspect that it was again related to Israel's presence in the games as I Wayan Koster reportedly rejected Israeli presence.

Meanwhile in Indonesia, public anger has mounted on Ganjar Pranowo and I Wayan Koster over the cancellation of the games. One of the national team players, Diego Michiels posted pictures of both governors in his personal Instagram account with the caption of "Thanks boss, you both rock! Don't forget to take responsibility when we're banned again!". Another player, Stefano Lilipaly also criticize both governors satirically by writing in his Instagram account with the caption "gone" and "even funnier".

Ganjar's decision to boycott the games was criticized by Gerindra, as party treasurer Budi Djiwandono expressed the party's disappointment of the cancellation and party spokesman Andre Rosiade states that "despite our support for Palestine, the U-20 World cup is an indicator of success for our nation". Hashim Djojohadikusumo called Ganjar a hater of the national team. Echoing his father's views and breaking partisan lines, Mayor of Solo Gibran Rakabuming Raka openly expressed his disappointment to Ganjar Pranowo on Ganjar's decision to boycott the games, citing that everyone had worked hard to prepare for the games from pre-event to post-event, only to be shut down by the boycott. The cancellation hurts Ganjar Pranowo's and PDI-P's electoral chances for the 2024 Indonesian general election as their chances to win had dived down with the indication that Jokowi will switch his support for another candidate. It became more evident on the shift as relationship between Jokowi and Megawati has become more tense after the cancellation of the games. Political analysts believed that the cancellation will bring benefit towards Prabowo Subianto's electability instead.

Indonesian politician and member of the People's Representative Council, Fadli Zon accused FIFA for applying double standards that favour Israel, despite the ongoing Israeli–Palestinian conflict that affects Palestinian football. He also referred that double standards with the prohibition of Russia participating in all FIFA competitions due to the occurring Russian invasion of Ukraine.

Economically, the cancellation has caused an economic loss of Rp. 3,7 trillion in the form of loss of potential tourism and tax gains according to Minister of Tourism and Creative Economy Sandiaga Uno.

In the end with Erick Thohir's lobbying to President of FIFA Gianni Infantino, Indonesia will eventually host the 2023 FIFA U-17 World Cup, taking over from Peru after Peru withdrew from hosting the competition. To prevent from any sort of boycotts happening again, Ganjar Pranowo's social media accounts were flooded by comments asking him to not make any weird comments about the competition and focus solely on his presidential campaign.

== See also ==
- Removal of Peru as 2023 FIFA U-17 World Cup hosts
- 1962 Asian Games, another sports event hosted by Indonesia in which the Israel national team were barred from entering the country
- Boycotts of Israel in sports
