= Indonesia–Palestine relations =

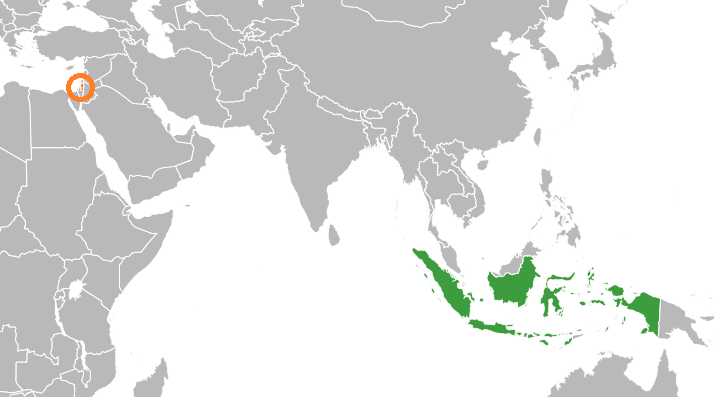

- Indonesia: Palestine

Diplomatic mission
- Embassy of Indonesia, Amman: Embassy of the State of Palestine, Jakarta

Envoy
- Ambassador Ade Padmo Sarwono: Ambassador Zuhair Al-Shun

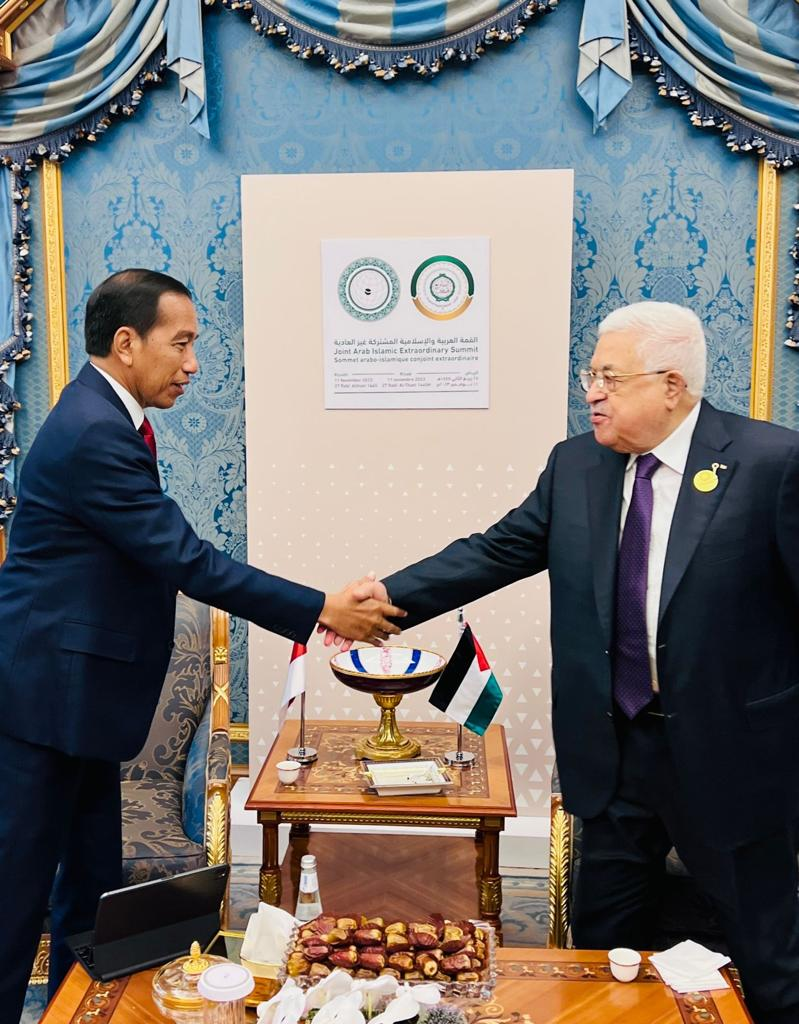
Joko Widodo and Mahmoud Abbas in a bilateral talk amid the Extraordinary Summit of Organisation of Islamic Cooperation in Riyadh on 11 November 2023

Relations between Indonesia and Palestine have been very close, especially regarding the latter's long-standing conflict against Israel. Indonesia has refused to recognize the State of Israel until a peace agreement is reached between Israel and the State of Palestine. Indonesia has strongly stood up for the rights and freedoms of the Palestinians and has supported the struggles of the Palestinians.

== History ==
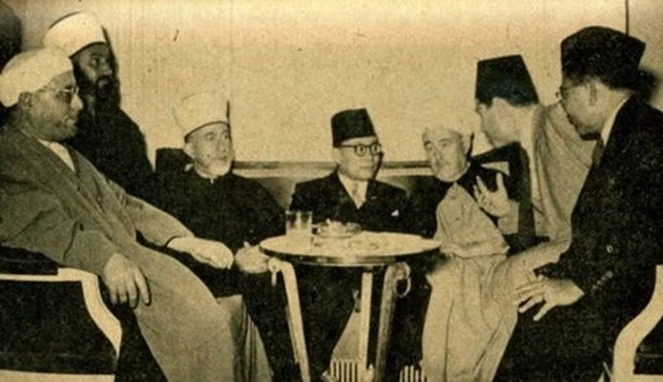
Indonesian first Vice president Mohammad Hatta with Haj Amin al-Husseini and other Arab leaders c. 1947–1951.

The earliest visit to Palestine by an Indonesian independence activist was in 1931, when Abdoel Kahar Moezakir represented the Indonesian muslims at the World Islamic Congress in Jerusalem led by Mufti Amin Al-Husseini.

Palestine was one of the earlier supporters of Indonesian independence in 1945. Grand Mufti of Jerusalem and Supreme Leader of the Council of Palestine, Sheikh Muhammad Amin al-Husaini was credited to raise other Arab states recognition of Indonesia, particularly through Arab League. They also agreed to pressure the British whose troops had arrived in Indonesia ahead of the Dutch, not to support the Dutch. As a result, Indonesia was particularly hostile towards relations with Israel from the very beginning as a gratitude toward the Palestinians. Indonesian Presidents Sukarno strongly supported the Arab States' aggression and struggle against Israel. Even after the fall of Soekarno and the rise to power of General Suharto, Indonesia strongly supported the cause of the Palestinians. The Leader of the Palestine Liberation Organization, Yasser Arafat had visited Indonesia in 1984 and in 1993. With the fall of New Order, Abdurrahman Wahid attempted to improve relations with Israel but he was removed from office in July 2001 and no effort was maintained to improve the relations between Indonesia and Israel. In 1988 official relations began between Indonesia and Palestine with the Indonesian recognition of Palestine. In 1990 an embassy was opened in Jakarta.

== High level visits ==
The Leader of the Palestine Liberation Organization, Yasser Arafat had visited Indonesia for several times in 1984 to meet President Soeharto and in September 1992 to attend 10th Non-Aligned Movement Summit in Jakarta and in 1993 and most recently in August 2000 to meet President Abdurrahman Wahid in Jakarta.

On 21–23 October 2007, Palestinian President Mahmoud Abbas conducted his first-ever official State visit to Indonesia, during his visit, President Abbas had signed several agreements on cooperation with Indonesia. The Agreements included cooperation in the areas of communications and education. Abbas visited Indonesia again in May 2010 and February 2014.

== Criticism of recent Israeli policies ==
In December 2008, during the Gaza war, Indonesian President Susilo Bambang Yudhoyono said the Indonesian government remained consistent in supporting the struggle of the Palestinian people to maintain their rights and sovereignty. He said that "Israel's unproportionally all-out war on Hamas with a great number of fatalities is an unforgettable human tragedy. We invite all parties to help stop the Israeli attacks and we will continue to support the Palestinian struggle. Indonesia finds it necessary for the UN Security Council to make a formal meeting and issue a resolution to force Israel to halt its aggression."

After the 31 May 2010 Gaza flotilla raid, Indonesian President Susilo Bambang Yudhoyono condemned Israeli action. Foreign Minister Marty Natalegawa also condemned the action and said that the Israeli blockade in Gaza is a violation of international law.

During the 2014 Gaza War, Indonesian government condemned the ongoing Israeli military aggression in Palestine's Gaza area, saying such an onslaught may ruin conditions towards creation of peace between Palestine and Israel. "Israel's move needs to be opposed. A military aggression that worsens the suffering that has been different by Palestinians in Gaza and West Bank until today due to siege which is actually a' collective punishment' against Palestine people," said Indonesian Foreign Affairs Minister Marty Natalegawa. During the campaign for his 2014 election, President Joko Widodo also condemned Israel's attack on Gaza.

=== Response to the Gaza war ===
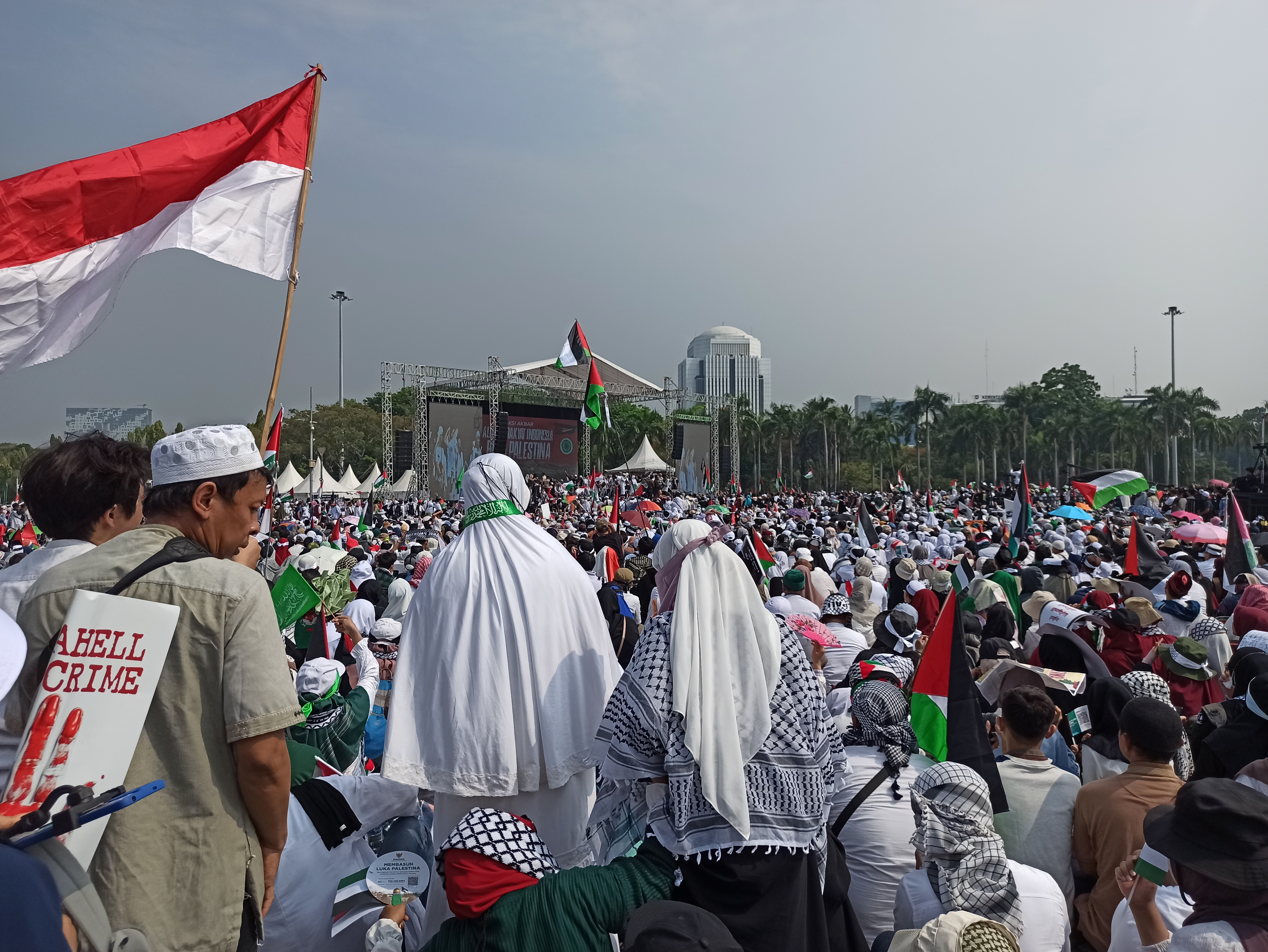
Indonesian residents hold a demonstration in support of Palestine in Jakarta, during the Gaza war.

Indonesia has condemned Israel's response to the October 7 attacks. Specifically, Foreign Minister Retno Marsudi issued the "harshest of condemnations" towards Israel's assault on the Indonesian Hospital in Gaza.

"Indonesia will not remain silent watching civilian casualties continue to mount, seeing gross injustice against the Palestinian people that continues to occur," said Jokowi in a press statement broadcast via the Presidential Secretariat's YouTube channel in Jakarta. Together with the Organisation of Islamic Cooperation (OIC), Indonesia sent a message to the world to stop the escalation of attacks and use of violence in Palestine. Indonesia and the OIC also asked to focus on solving humanitarian problems and the root of the problem, namely the Israeli occupation of Palestine. "Indonesia together with the OIC sends a strong message to the world to stop escalation, to stop the use of violence, to focus on humanitarian issues, and resolve the root of the problem, namely the Israeli occupation of Palestine," Jokowi emphasized. Jokowi also encouraged the world to stand together to build global solidarity to resolve the Palestinian problem fairly. Jokowi also requested that the problem be resolved using agreed International parameters. "Indonesia will continue to voice this on various occasions and international forums, including bilaterally with the Prime Minister of Saudi Arabia and at the ASEAN-GCC Summit tomorrow," said Jokowi.

As part of a delegation of OIC countries, agreed to during an emergency session of the Islamic Summit Conference, Marsudi visited China and Russia, both Permanent Members of the UNSC, in an effort to garner support for a ceasefire. In Moscow, Marsudi stated that Israel's claim of self-defensive action, through its combined air- and ground assault, is inexcusable; "Israel, a colonialist, cannot use such an excuse" [ sic ]. Marsudi iterates that, even if it were a valid excuse, self-defensive action is not "a license to kill civilian"[sic]. She states that the intention of the OIC delegation is to formulate peace through the implementation of the two-state solution.

Indonesia is preparing to send the hospital ship KRI dr. Radjiman Wedyodiningrat to Gaza.

In February 2026, following a security meeting with Subianto, chief of staff of the Indonesian National Armed Forces, Maruli Simanjuntak, announced that the country is preparing to send between 5,000 to 8,000 to Gaza as part of the International Stabilization Force.

== See also ==
- Foreign relations of Palestine
- Foreign relations of Indonesia
