= Embassy of Indonesia, Amman =

Embassy of the Republic of Indonesia in Amman Kedutaan Besar Republik Indonesia di Amman سفارة الجمهورية الإندونيسية عمان بالمملكة الأردنية الهاشمية،

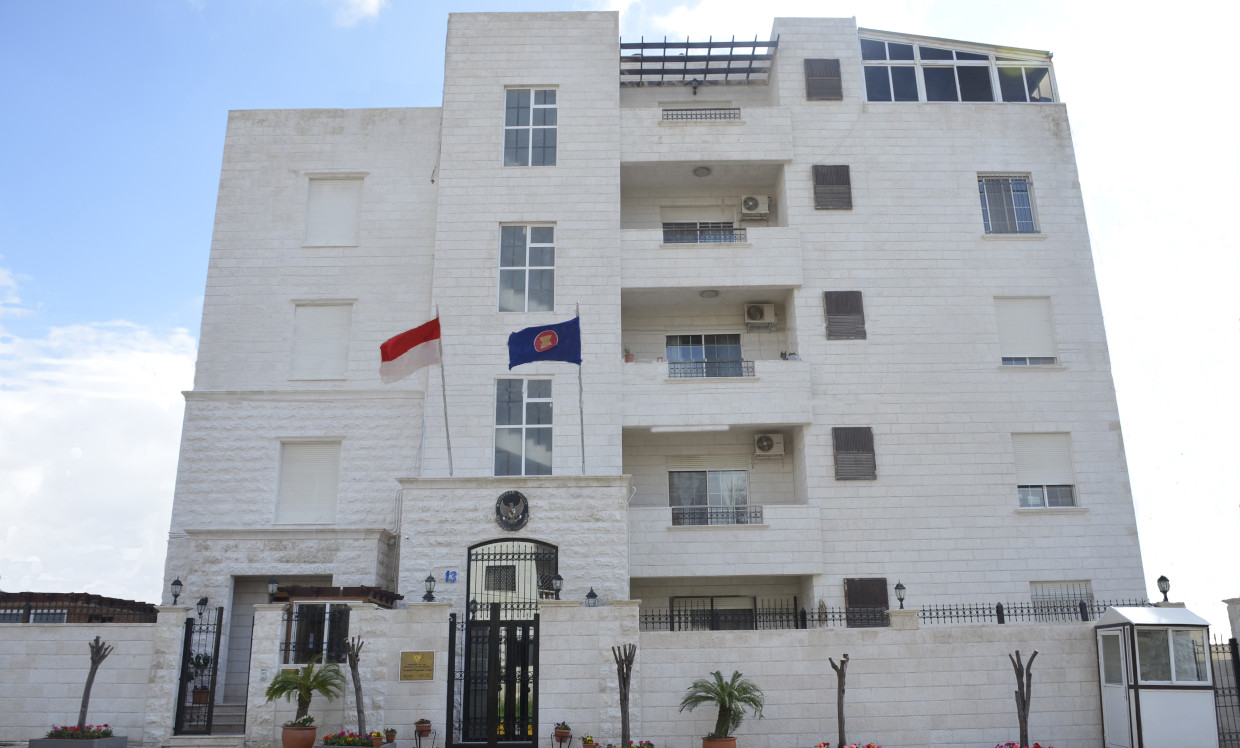
- Location: Amman, Jordan
- Address: 13 Ali Seedo Al-Kurdi Street; Amman, Jordan
- Coordinates: 31.94751°N 35.873951°E
- Ambassador: Ade Padmo Sarwono
- Jurisdiction: Jordan; Palestine
- Website: kemlu.go.id/amman/en

The Embassy of the Republic of Indonesia in Amman (Indonesian: Kedutaan Besar Republik Indonesia di Amman; Arabic: سفارة الجمهورية الإندونيسية عمان بالمملكة الأردنية الهاشمية،) is the diplomatic mission of the Republic of Indonesia to the Hashemite Kingdom of Jordan. The embassy is concurrently accredited to the State of Palestine. The first Indonesian ambassador to Jordan was Zainul Yasni (1985–1988). The current ambassador, Ade Padmo Sarwono, was appointed by President Joko Widodo on 25 October 2021.

== History ==
Diplomatic relations between Indonesia and Jordan were established in 1950. However, the Indonesian embassy in Amman was only opened in 1985. Bilateral relations between Indonesia and Palestine were established on 19 October 1989. The embassy has been accredited to Palestine since 1 June 2004. Prior to this, Palestine was accredited to the Indonesian embassy in Tunis, Tunisia.

== See also ==
- Indonesia–Jordan relations
- Indonesia–Palestine relations
- List of diplomatic missions of Indonesia
