= PragerU Kids =

Children's division of an American conservative media organisation

PragerU Kids is the children's division of the conservative American media organization PragerU, created by Dennis Prager and kickstarted with venture capital from American petroleum industry businessmen Dan and Farris Wilks. PragerU Kids came to wider media attention in the United States following the state of Florida's decision to allow PragerU Kids videos to be shown in the state's schools.

Much of the content of PragerU Kids has come under scrutiny of media experts and educators, such as videos which downplay the Warsaw Uprising. Other messages within PragerU Kids videos include attempts to morally justify the British colonization of India under the pretext of spreading Christianity and change, and Canada's healthcare system being inferior to the American one. In one PragerU Kids video, George Floyd, an American man who was killed in police custody, was described as "a Black man who resisted arrest". Some of the episodes are narrated by conservative media personalities such as Tucker Carlson and Candace Owens.

== Leo & Layla series ==
One of the video series released by PragerU Kids, titled Leo & Layla's History Adventures, features two children who travel back in time to meet historical figures. Several of the videos in this series, including those featuring Christopher Columbus and Booker T. Washington, attempt to defend and/or downplay the nature of slavery.
