= Operation Alpha (Indonesia) =

Covert operation by Indonesian military

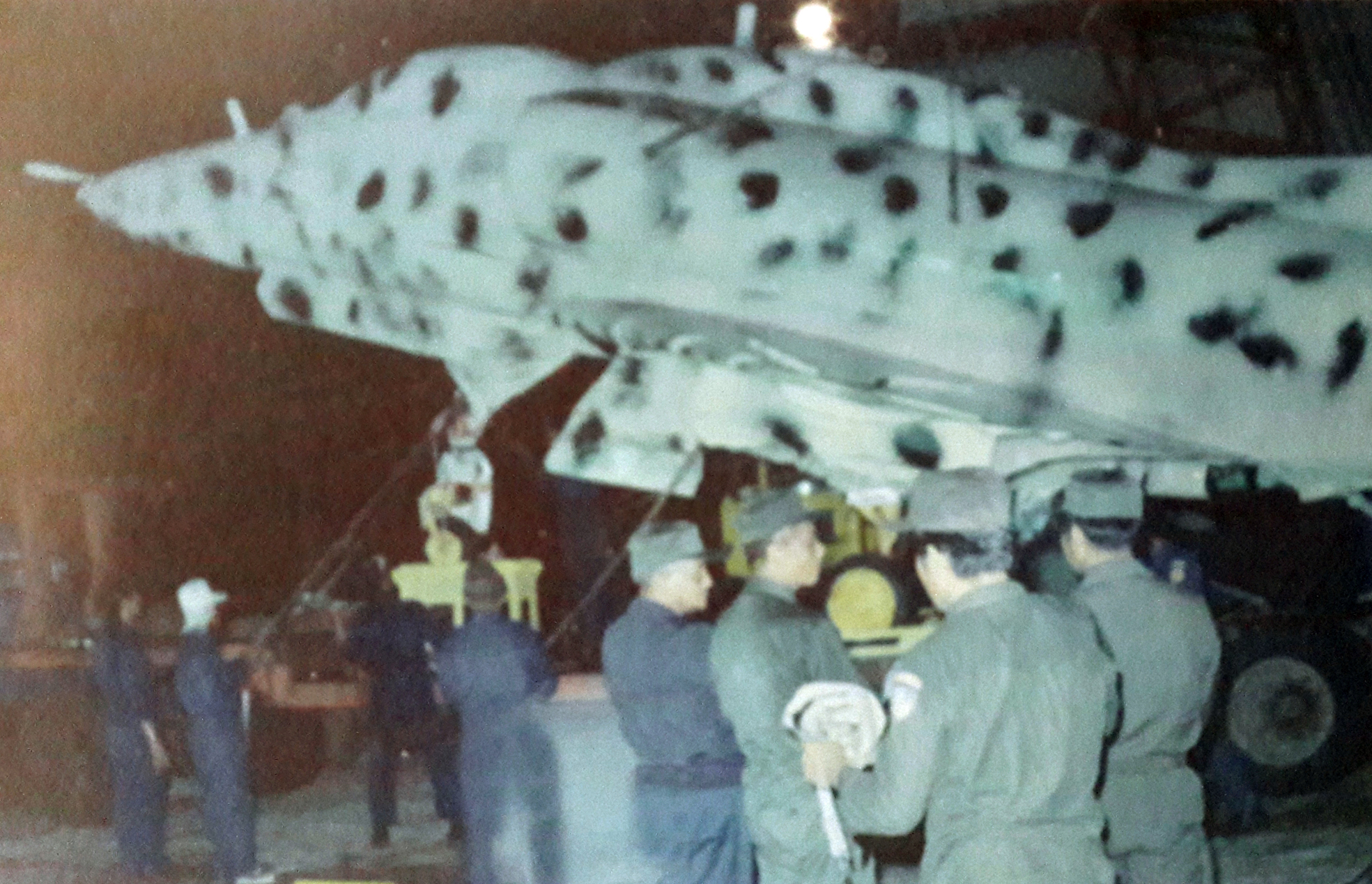
An A-4 Skyhawk unloaded from a ship at Tanjung Priok port

Operation Alpha (Indonesian: Operasi Alpha) (in Israel known as "פולינז" or Polines for Operation Alpha I in 1980 and "מזורקה" or Mazurka for Operation Alpha II in 1982) was a covert operation carried out by the Indonesian Air Force (Indonesian: Tentara Nasional Indonesia Angkatan Udara) between 1979 and 1982 to acquire 30 (14 during Operation Alpha I and 16 during Operation Alpha II) Douglas A-4 Skyhawk light combat aircraft from the Israeli Air Force.

The operation included the training of Indonesian pilots by Israeli instructors and the disguising of the jets during delivery from Israel to Indonesia. This was recounted by the former Commander of the National Air Defense Command (Pangkohanudnas) Vice-Marshal Djoko Poerwoko through his autobiography; Menari di Angkasa (Indonesian for Dancing in the Sky). According to Poerwoko, the operation was "The biggest clandestine operation carried out by the Indonesian National Armed Forces (then Angkatan Bersenjata Republik Indonesia or ABRI)".

== Background ==
Operation Alpha was motivated by a shortage of modern combat aircraft in the Indonesian Air Force of the New Order era, especially in light of the situation in East Timor. By 1980, American aircraft such as the F-86/CAC Sabre and T-33 had become obsolete and were not economical to maintain due to their age, and the Soviet-supplied jets procured in the 60s, such as MiG fighters, Il-28s, and Tu-16s had been grounded due to the lack of technical support after relations with the Soviet Union suffered following the G30S incident and the subsequent massacres, cementing the shift to western-made arms. The United States was willing to sell 16 F-5 E/F Tiger II jets to the Indonesian Air Force, but these were deemed insufficient.

Intelligence Officials received information that Israel was willing to sell 32 A-4 Skyhawk to Indonesia. There were multiple problems with this deal, other than the lack of diplomatic relations, the purchase of military equipment from Israel risked facing strong protest from the Indonesian public. However, the ABRI decided to continue the operation.

== Execution ==
Before sending the pilots, the Indonesian government sent a number of Air Force technicians who were divided into seven groups; they operated in Israel for 20 months in 1979; after the last group of technicians completed their training, 10 Indonesian Air Force pilots were tendered for departure to Israel in September 1980. The ten pilots who participated in Operation Alpha were Lt. Col. Suyamto, Major Irawan Saleh, Major Donan Sunanto, Captain PA. Lumintang, Captain F. Djoko Poerwoko, Captain Suminar Hadi, Captain Dwie Harmono, Captain Teddy Sumarno, Captain R. Supriyanto, and First Lieutenant Eddy Haryoko; none of them had yet been informed of their true mission. The ten departed on a Garuda Indonesia flight from Halim Perdanakusuma Air Force Base to Paya Lebar Air Base in Singapore. After landing in Singapore, they were met by several ABRI intelligence officers. During dinner, one of ABRI's Strategic Intelligence Agency (BAIS) officers asked for their passports and replaced them with a "Travel Document in Lieu of a Passport" (SPLP).

It was then that the Chief of BAIS ABRI, Major General Benny Moerdani, briefed them. Moerdani stated that the operation was confidential. If they failed the mission, the Indonesian government would renounce their respective citizenships. Moreover, Moerdani gave them the option to return home if any of the pilots had second thoughts. He stated that the operation would only be considered successful if the A-4 Skyhawks, codenamed 'merpati', entered Indonesian possession. The assembled pilots started to suspect that their mission would take place in Israel, involving the transfer of Israeli aircraft.

That same night the ten pilot took on new identities, they would not identify as a citizen of Indonesia, civilian or military. They were then flown to Frankfurt Airport. The ten were still somewhat unsure of their final destination until they received boarding passes for their next flight to Ben Gurion Airport in Tel Aviv, Israel.

=== Israel ===
Upon arrival in Israel, they were quickly arrested and escorted by Ben Gurion airport security officers. The officers were in fact undercover Mossad agents, taking the pilots to a basement where they were greeted by BAIS ABRI officers.

The ten received a short briefing on common things that must be considered while in Israel. They were taught to memorize a few Hebrew sentences such as "Ani tayas mi Singapore" meaning "I am a pilot from Singapore" (they were to identify as Singaporean pilots), and "boker tov" or "good morning". After the briefing, they traveled for two days over land; south along the Dead Sea to the city of Eilat, to the Etzion Air Base.

The pilots agreed that during training the Etzion Air Base which was to be called "Arizona" since officially the pilots were sent to train in Arizona. They trained on the A-4 Skyhawks, carrying out various maneuvers, combat exercises, even training to penetrate the Syrian border.

Flight training concluded after about 4 months, on May 20, 1980. The ten pilots graduated and so were entitled to receive combat pilot certification. However, the accompanying BAIS officers burned those certificates in front of the pilots, there must not be evidence of military cooperation between Indonesia and Israel.

=== United States ===
To complete the cover story, the pilots were then brought to the United States to take pictures. They arrived in New York and visited landmarks such as the Niagara Falls, they were instructed to take pictures in front of landmarks that were undeniably American to add to the masquerade.

After New York, they were taken to Marine Corps Air Station Yuma in Arizona. They spent 3 days in Yuma and were educated on the USMC's A-4s, taking more photos on the way. They also received the USMC's A-4 certificates and took a graduation photo. The unit commanders reminded the pilots that they in fact were trained in the US, not Israel. After their time in the US, they flew to Singapore and returned home to Indonesia.

== A-4 Skyhawk in Indonesian service ==
see also: List of Douglas A-4 Skyhawk operators

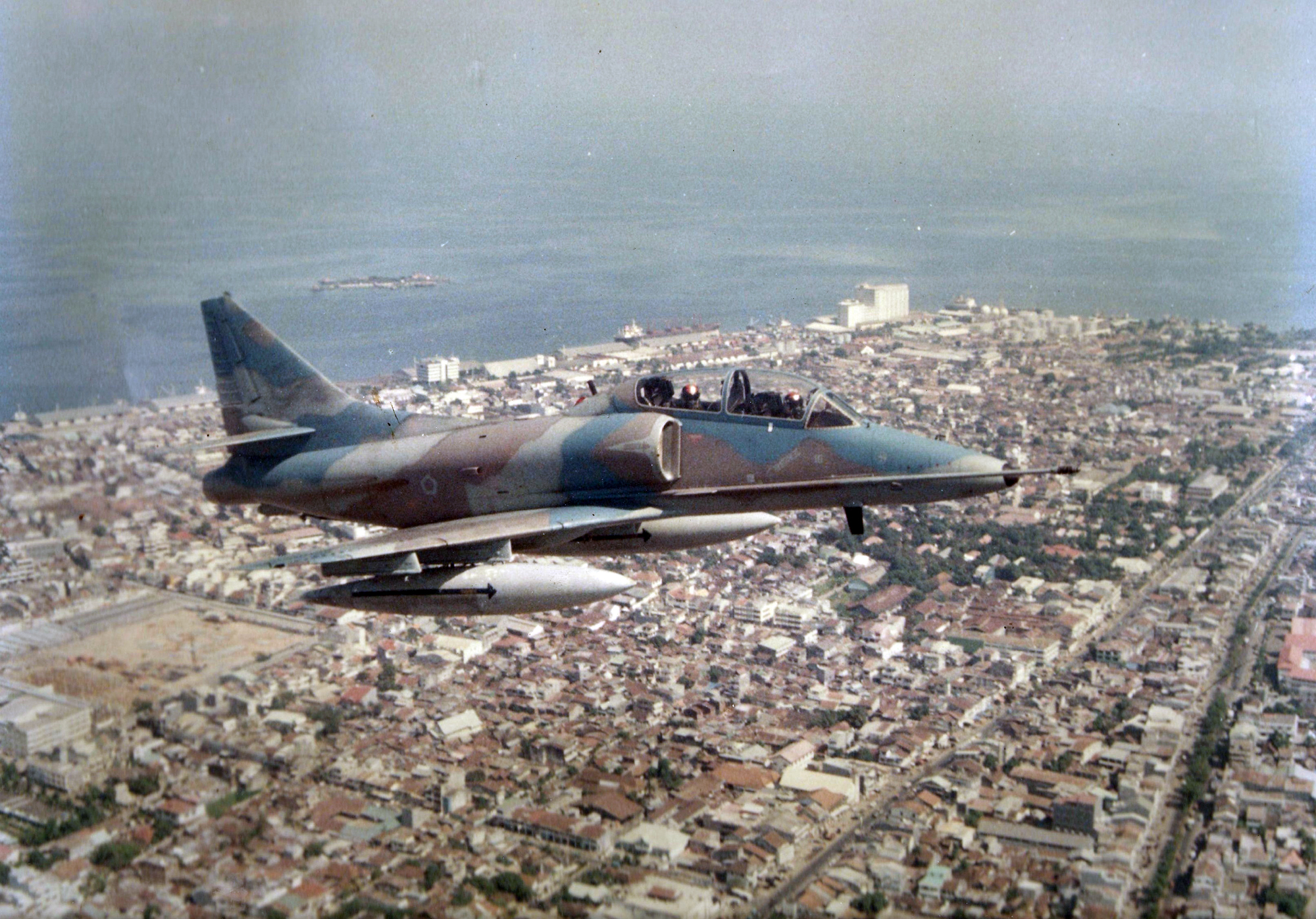
Indonesian A-4 with extended exhaust, a modification found in Israeli A-4 to counter heat seeking missile

On May 3, 1980, a USAF C-5 Galaxy landed in Iswahjudi Air Force Base with F-5E/F Tiger IIs, and on the next day the first batch of the Israeli A-4 Skyhawks, consisting of two single-seat aircraft (Tail numbers TT-0401 and TT-0414) and two twin-seat aircraft (Tail numbers TL-0415 and TL-0416), arrived at Tanjung Priok port. The jets were packaged at the Etzion Air Base and were transported by ship directly from Israel; they were wrapped in plastic and labeled 'F-5' to make it seem as though this was another American delivery. After being unwrapped, the planes were inspected and assembled with the help of Israeli technicians, and then they were flown to the Hasanuddin Air Force Base in Makassar, where they entered service with the 11th Air Squadron.

The A-4 Skyhawks continued to arrive intermittently. Sources disagree on the exact, final number, but in total, Indonesia acquired about 14 (+1 as a replacement) A-4 Skyhawks from Israel in 1980, and 16 A-4s in 1982, 30 units in total. Of the 30 A-4, most of them were A-4Es, with the remaining being TA-4H training variants. and TA-4J. In 1998–1999 Indonesia bought 2 unit of 2 seat TA-4J from the US and was upgraded in New Zealand. In 1981, Israel sent 2 more A-4E (one was TT-0417) as a replacement for the crashed A-4s.

The A-4 Skyhawks performed numerous military operations in Indonesian service. These operations included Operation Lotus (1980–1999) in East Timor, Operation Oscar (1991–1992) in Sulawesi, and Operation Rencong Terbang (1991–1995) in Aceh.

On August 4, 2004, 3 A-4s (2 A-4E registration TT-0440 and TT-0431, led by 1 TA-4 registration TL-0416) from the 11th Air Squadron took off for the last time from Adisutjipto Air Force Base in Yogyakarta, during this flight one of the A-4Es, piloted by Captain Bambang Pramuhadi, experienced engine troubles, the aircraft made a landing at Iswahjudi Air Force Base and Pramuhadi continued the flight using an AS-202 Bravo trainer aircraft, rejoining the other 2 A-4s that continued to fly to Adisutjipto Air Force Base. After arriving at Adisutjipto, flight leader Major Jemi Trisonjaya immediately handed over the two A-4s to base commander Benyamin Dandel, and signed the handover of the aircraft. All A-4s were retired by 2004.

== See also ==
- Indonesia–Israel relations
- Indonesian Air Force
- Equipment of the Indonesian Air Force
- Douglas A-4 Skyhawk
