= Xaviaer DuRousseau =

American political commentator (born 1997)

- Born: January 8, 1997 (age 29); Chicago, Illinois, U.S.
- Occupations: Political commentator; internet personality
- Years active: 2021–present
- Political party: Republican

TikTok information
- Page: xaviaer
- Followers: 747,200
- Last updated: April 27, 2026
- Website: xaviaer.com

Xaviaer DuRousseau is an American social media influencer, podcaster, political and social activist and commentator who is known for his transformation from progressive to conservative Republican.

== Early life and education ==
DuRousseau was born in Englewood, Chicago in 1997, and grew up in rural Pontiac, Illinois, in a "very left-wing" family that was "broke as hell." He said he built his entire perspective around his racial identity when he was growing up, after encountering some racism from police and classmates in his small, mostly white hometown. He played football, ran track, attended church, and earned co-valedictorian status at his high school. He pushed his university to require students to take ethnic studies courses. After high school, he attended the University of Illinois Urbana-Champaign.

== Political transformation and views ==
Between 2018 and 2020, he was advocating for BLM, social issues, and mostly progressive topics on social media. In one video he could be seen marching in a BLM parade in around 2020, chanting “George Floyd — Say His Name!” DuRousseau marched in Black Lives Matter protests and voted for Senator Bernie Sanders. In 2020, he was slated to appear on Netflix's The Circle, a reality show in which he would debate conservative contestants and expose their biases. While preparing, he watched videos from right-wing groups and found himself agreeing with their views. He decided he could not champion left-wing politics as planned, and withdrew from the show. He summarized his unplanned turnaround with the line "I accidentally red pilled myself".

DuRousseau told Rolling Stone that he and many other Gen Z members were attracted to the MAGA movement as a form of rebellion after finding the mainstream media corrupt and preachy. He described himself and his cohort as "ideologically pro-life, legislatively pro-choice." He is also a vocal opponent of Islam and "Sharia law," a catch-all term he uses for practices and legal interpretations he associates with Islam writ large, without distinguishing among different Islamic schools of jurisprudence or Islamist movements, writing on X: "We built the freest, most prosperous civilization in human history on Judeo-Christian foundations—not on Sharia. [...] We will not submit. And we will not apologize for refusing to import a system that is fundamentally incompatible with everything that made the West worth defending." DuRousseau has referred to Muslim U.S. Senate candidate, Abdul El-Sayed, as "Taqqiya," and he has accused him of "operating for sole interest of islamification [sic]" and of not "[belonging] in our country—let alone in office." He has described the Free Palestine movement as "the most performative, fake and gay movement in recorded history."

He is a staunch proponent of the U.S.-Israeli war on Iran, writing on social media: "The IRGC deserved every hit. Too many Americans do not understand foreign policy, nor the threat of Islam." He wrote in The Jerusalem Post that Black people were pressured to view Israel as an "apartheid state," which he called "an easily debunked lie." He supports Israeli Prime Minister Benyamin Netanyahu, and he identifies as Christian and Zionist. After visiting ravaged communities like Ofakim and Kfar Aza in the aftermath of the October 7 attacks, he said, "It was the first time in my life I feel like I looked evil right in the eye." On the third anniversary of October 7, DuRousseau quote retweeted an X post reporting Palestinians' fatalities and injuries during the Israel-Hamas war with "🥳🥂."

DuRousseau often makes provocative claims on social media, including a tweet stating that "civilization flourished" because of the "ethnic cleansing [of American Indians]" and that they were "barbaric savages."

== Career ==
DuRousseau hosted a children's show for PragerU Kids called "Guess or Mess," and made a series called "Walk with Me". He was invited to the 2024 Republican National Convention to participate in the convention's new content creator program. He serves on the Republican National Committee's youth advisory council.

DuRousseau rolled out a merch collection in November 2024 on his website, xaviaer.com, with products such as a baseball cap with the label "Donald Ja'Quan Trump" and t-shirts with text such as "Walk with Me" and "Zionism is demure." DuRousseau donates 18% of merch profits to "bringing psychiatric care to Israeli children affected by October 7th in partnership with the Maman Nonprofit."

In August 2025, DuRousseau and other American and Israeli social media influencers including Brooke Goldstein and Marwan Jaber went on a paid trip to Israel sponsored by the Diaspora Affairs Ministry to film and share content from the distribution sites. According to Haaretz, the aim of the campaign was "part of the fight against Hamas’ campaign to discredit [Israel]". DuRousseau wrote on X, "There is enough food at this aid base to feed every person in Gaza for at least a week, but the UN, Hamas, etc. refuse to distribute the food efficiently. Instead, it sits here to spoil and be stolen. How's that Israel's fault?"

DuRousseau called Beyoncé's fans "domestic terrorists" and described Vice President Kamala Harris as "desperate" during her 2024 presidential campaign. He said he was still a Beyoncé fan, but believed the star should avoid commenting on politics.

After wearing a shirt that said "Make Gaza Jewish again", he said he was not calling for "harm, exile, or hatred for anyone in Gaza", but rather for dismantling the "terrorist regime" in Gaza.

In 2025, DuRousseau was included in The Hollywood Reporter's "Creator A-List: The 50 Hottest Influencers on the Planet."

In November 2026, DuRousseau filed a lawsuit in the California Superior Court against PragerU, alleging racism and homophobia from a colleague, that PragerU intentionally put him in "unsafe positions" and ignored his safety concerns, and wrongfully terminated him.
