= Indonesia Hospital =

Hospital in the Gaza Strip, Palestine

Indonesia Hospital المستشفى الإندونيسي Rumah Sakit Indonesia
- Medical Emergency Rescue Committee
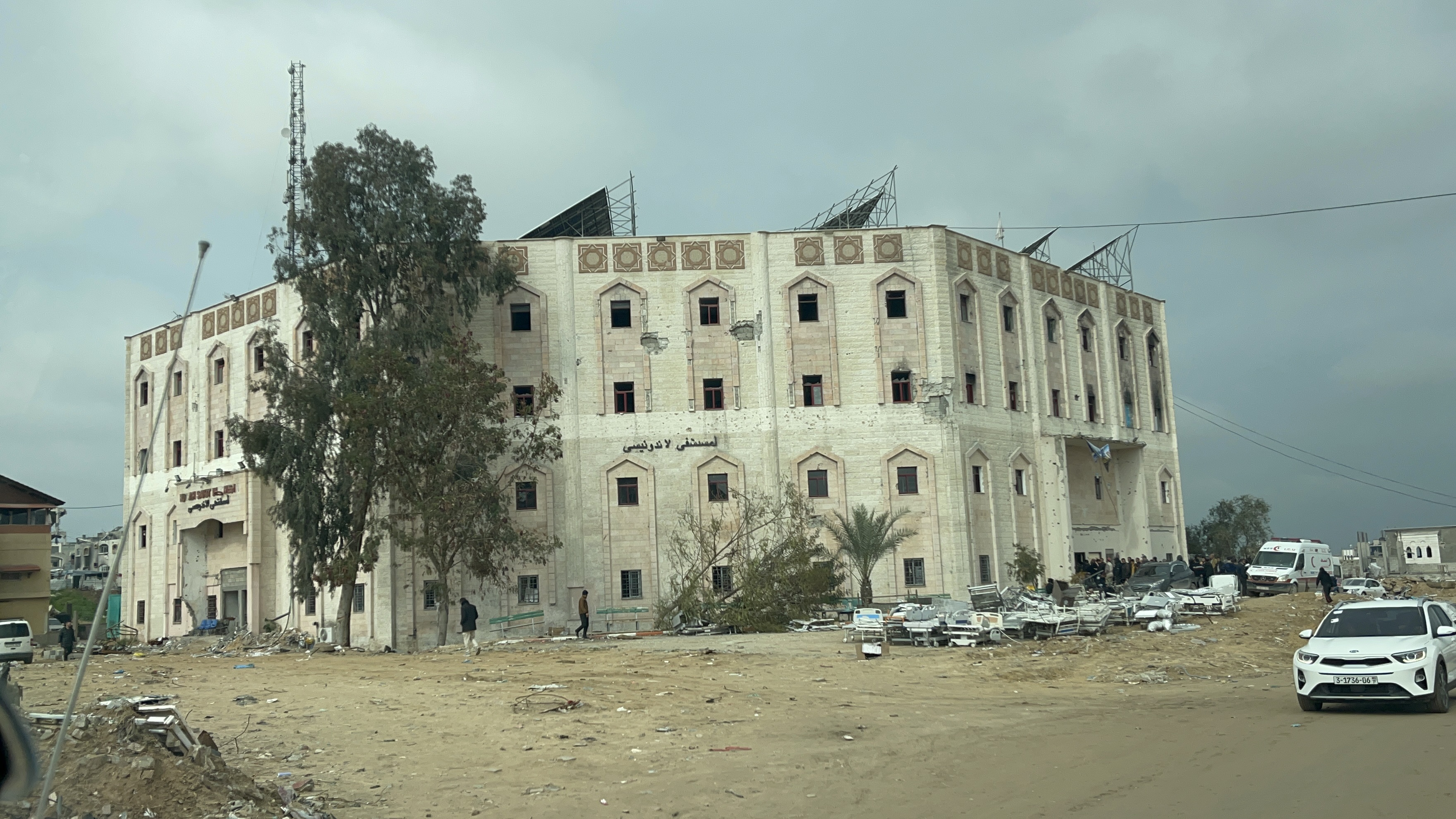
- The hospital in February 2025

Geography
- Location: Bait Lahia, Gaza Strip, Palestine
- Coordinates: 31°32′06.72″N 34°30′33.84″E

History
- Constructed: 2011
- Opened: 2016

Indonesia Hospital (Arabic: المستشفى الإندونيسي, romanized: al-Mustashfá al-Indūnīsī, Indonesian: Rumah Sakit Indonesia) is a hospital located in Bait Lahia, North Gaza Governorate, Gaza Strip.

== Facilities ==
The hospital has 100 ward beds, 4 operating theaters, and a 10-bed intensive care unit. The hospital had 400 staff members employed by the Gaza Health Ministry (GHM), and several volunteers from Indonesia.

== History ==
=== Construction ===
Construction of the hospital began in 2011 on 16,000 square meters of land donated by the government of Gaza. The project cost IDR 126 billion and was funded by donations from Indonesian people and organizations such as the Indonesian Red Cross Society (PMI) and Muhammadiyah, collected through the Indonesian humanitarian organization Medical Emergency Rescue Committee (MER-C). Indonesia's then-Vice-President Jusuf Kalla inaugurated the hospital on 9 January 2016.

=== Israeli invasion of Gaza ===
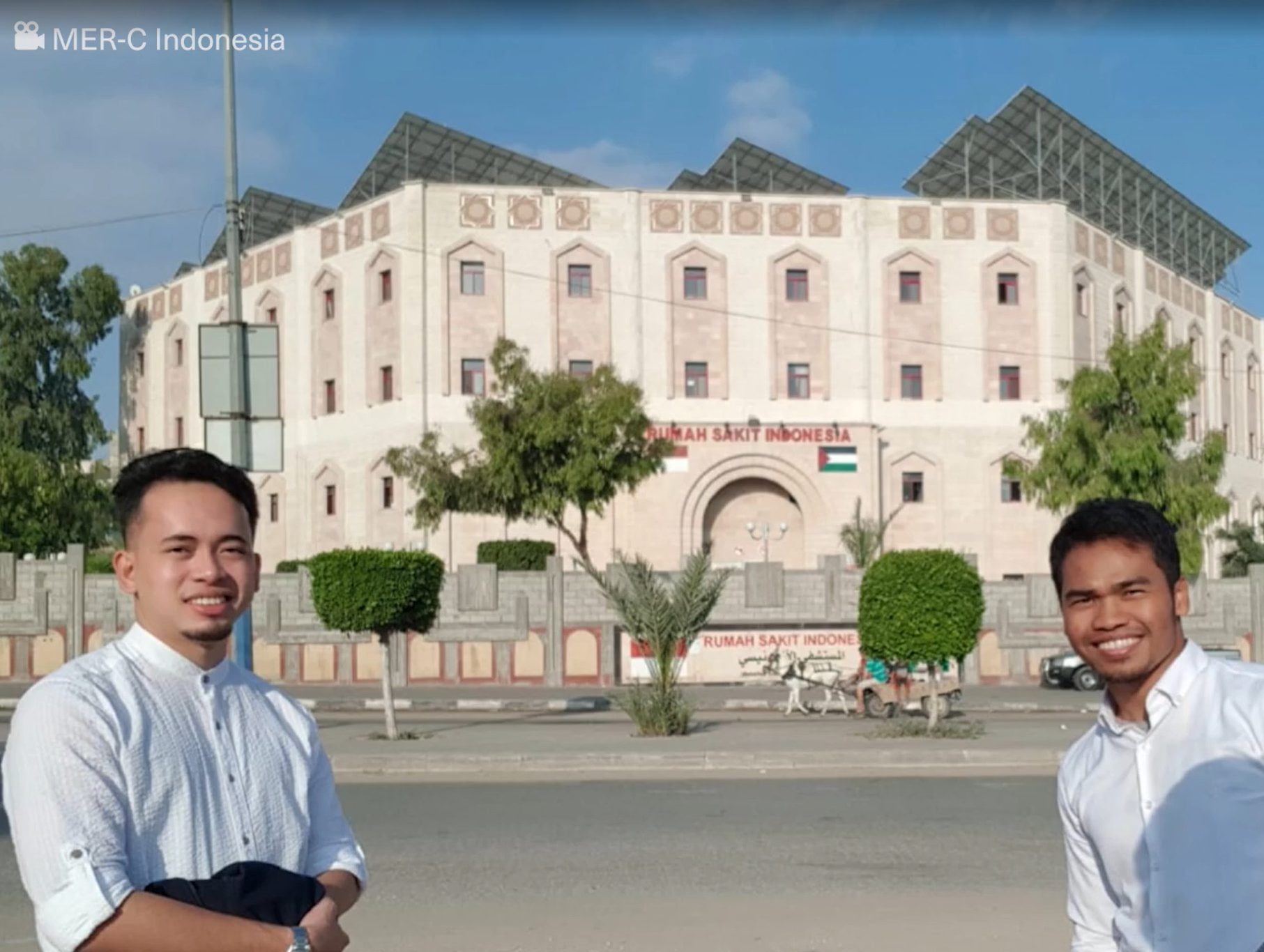
The hospital on December 15, 2023

On 20 November 2023, as part of the Israeli invasion of the Gaza Strip, the Israel Defense Forces (IDF) surrounded and besieged the hospital. That evening, projectiles fired into the second floor killed at least 12 people and destroyed the front entrance. The IDF denied that it was responsible. Israel claims that Hamas was using the hospital as a military base. From December 2023, the building was taken over by the IDF.

The Indonesian Foreign Minister Retno Marsudi issued a harsh condemnation after the strike during a diplomatic visit to China. As president of the United Nations Security Council (UNSC) she pushed for a ceasefire on moral grounds.

Al Jazeera reported that on Friday, 24 November, Israeli forces attacked the hospital, leaving much of it damaged. A Gaza Health Ministry (GHM) spokesperson and other reports said the patients and personnel were then evacuated.

In June 2024, the hospital reopened to patients as the only medical facility in northern Gaza.

In February 2025, an aid worker for Doctors Without Borders wrote that Israeli forces who previously occupied the hospital had smashed every medical care machine "to pieces, one by one, to make sure no medical care could be provided anymore".

== See also ==
- Gaza genocide
- List of hospitals in the State of Palestine
- Indonesia–Palestine relations
