= Ministry of Foreign Affairs (Indonesia) =

Government ministry

- Kementerian Luar Negeri
- Seal of the Ministry of Foreign Affairs

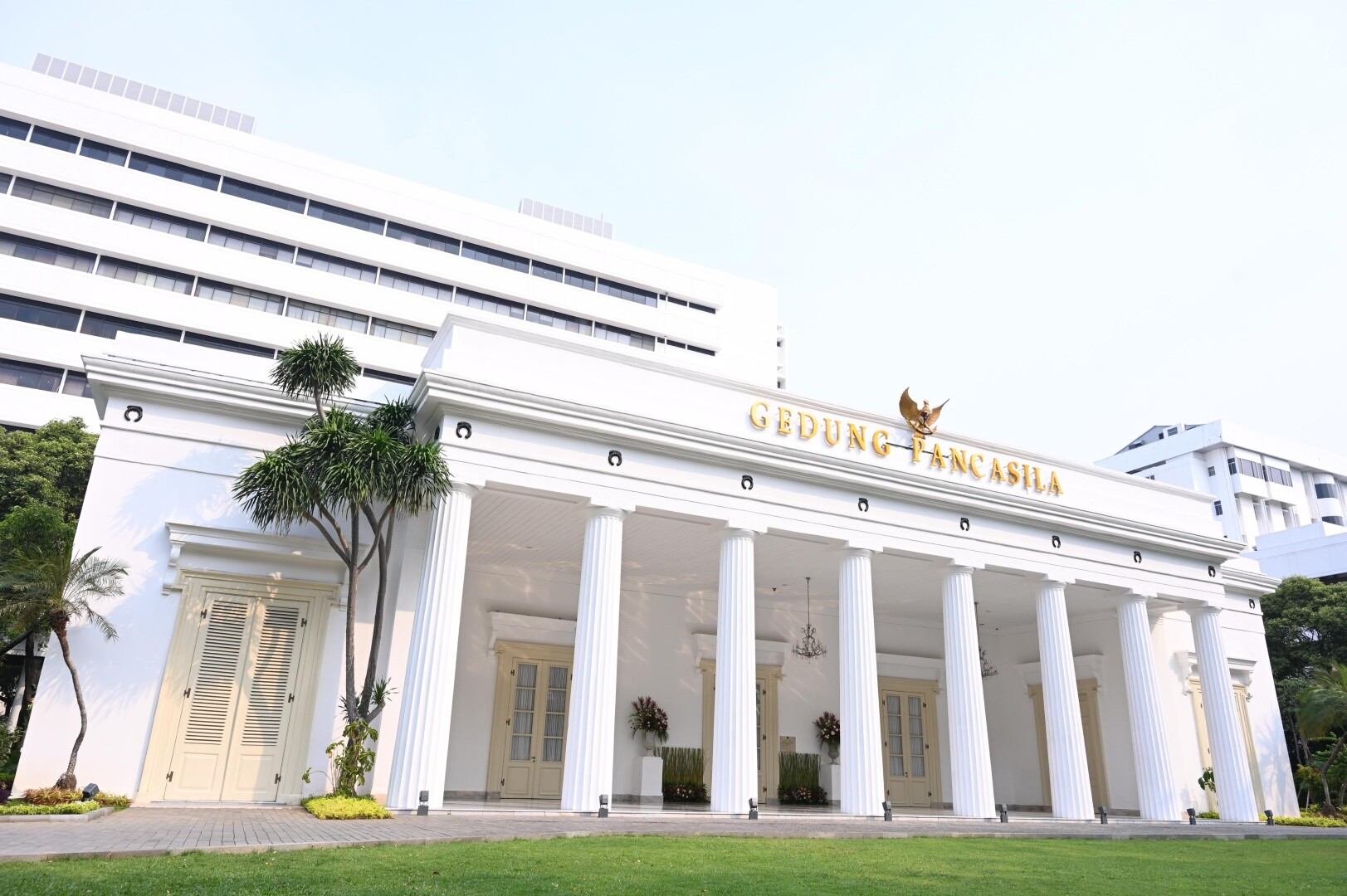
- Pancasila Building, part of the Ministry of Foreign Affairs headquarters

Ministry overview
- Formed: 19 August 1945; 81 years ago
- Jurisdiction: Government of Indonesia
- Headquarters: Pejambon 6 Central Jakarta, Jakarta Capital Region, Indonesia
- Motto: Caraka Bhuwana (Envoy of the nation to the world)
- Employees: 3,349 Civil Service employees
- Annual budget: $549.2 million (FY 2019)
- Minister responsible: Arrmanatha Nasir, Minister for Foreign Affairs
- Deputy Ministers responsible: Anis Matta, Deputy Minister for Foreign Affairs; Arif Havas Oegroseno, Deputy Minister for Foreign Affairs
- Parent department: Coordinating Ministry for Political and Security Affairs
- Website: www.kemlu.go.id

Seal of the ministry (used from 2001 to 2023)

The Ministry of Foreign Affairs of the Republic of Indonesia (Indonesian: Kementerian Luar Negeri Republik Indonesia, Kemlu) is an Indonesian government ministry responsible for the country's foreign relations and diplomacy. The ministry was formerly known as the Department of Foreign Affairs (Departemen Luar Negeri Republik Indonesia, Deplu) until 2008 when the nomenclature changed with the enactment of the 2008 State Ministry Act (Undang-Undang Nomor 39 Tahun 2008 tentang Kementerian Negara).

The Ministry of Foreign Affairs is one of three ministries, along with Ministry of Defense and Ministry Home Affairs, that is explicitly mentioned in the Constitution of Indonesia, hence the president has no authority to dissolve the ministry.

According to Article 8 of the Constitution, in case that both the president and the vice president can no longer serve at the same time, the line of succession temporarily falls to a troika of minister of foreign affairs, minister of home affairs, and minister of defense who would govern concurrently until the succeeding President and Vice President are elected by the People's Consultative Assembly within thirty days of the posts' vacancy.

Since October 2026, Arrmanatha Nasir has served as Minister of Foreign Affairs, succeeding Sugiono.

== History ==
The Ministry of Foreign Affairs was founded in 1945 following the Proclamation of Indonesian Independence from the Netherlands. The headquarters was initially located in the garage of the country's first Minister of Foreign Affairs, Achmad Soebardjo, at Jl. Cikini 80–82 in Jakarta. The Ministry started with just six employees, including Hadi Thayeb.

=== National Revolution period (1945–1950) ===
During the first five years of the Ministry's existence, the supreme task was to gain overseas recognition and international sympathy of Indonesian struggle for independence, all while during ongoing armed conflict with the Dutch colonial forces. The young government managed to held peace talks and conferences with several parties, such as at Linggadjati (1946) or onboard USS Renville (1948). It actively supported high-level meeting such as the Round Table Conference (1949), where Indonesian independence was finally acknowledged by the Netherlands.

=== Liberal Democracy period (1950–1959) ===
During this period, Indonesian diplomatic corps further pursued international recognition for Indonesia. It successfully managed to apply for Indonesian membership in the United Nations (1950), hosted a high-level conference of Asian and African countries in Bandung (1955), conclude an important nationality agreement with People's Republic of China (1955), and abandoned Dutch-Indonesian Union in 1956. Despite some successes in other subjects, the New Guinea Question as the most important diplomacy goal remained unresolved throughout this period.

=== Guided Democracy period (1959–1966) ===
Sukarno's disappointment with what he perceived as weakness of western-style parliamentary democracy, led him to restore Indonesia's 1945 presidential constitution. Along with it was a shift in Indonesian foreign policy, where Indonesia pursued a closer relations with the Soviet Union, People's Republic of China, and the Eastern Bloc in general; Although Indonesia would also participate in the foundation of the Non-Aligned Movement in Belgrade (1961). It also demanded a resolution on Dutch continued presence and occupation in the Western New Guinea, where Indonesia would consider a military approach in order to assert Indonesian rights over the territory. Dutch presence on the island would end following the New York Agreement (1962), where the Dutch New Guinea administration will transfer from the Netherlands to the United Nations Temporary Executive Authority (UNTEA), then to Indonesia.

Following the formation of Malaya, Singapore, Sabah, and North Borneo (Sabah) into the Federation of Malaysia (1963), Indonesia entered into a period of low-level confrontation with Malaysia, citing British imperialism in the region. Also during this period, Indonesia would suspend its membership in the United Nations, the only country to do so. The Konfrontasi would last until 1966, when the Sukarno administration was replaced, with Suharto became head of government, later President.

=== New Order period (1966–1998) ===
Under Suharto, many of foreign policy overtures under Sukarno was revamped. The "Free-and-Active" foreign policy was reconfirmed, although at the cost of relations with many communist countries; no formal diplomatic relations between Indonesia and the PRC existed until 1990.

Suharto's militarist administration would held a referendum in West New Guinea to fulfill a requirement regarding the transfer of administration. Although the Act of Free Choice (1969) was highly suspected to be held under threat of violence by the Indonesian military, the result was unanimous in support of Indonesian integration, and was accepted and adopted by the UN General Assembly in November 1969.

Another one of this period's diplomatic activities is the formation of ASEAN in 1967, following the conclusion of Bangkok Declaration by the delegates of Indonesia, Malaysia, Singapore, Thailand, and the Philippines. Indonesian government would also continue active participation in the Non-Aligned Movement and the Asia-Pacific Economic Cooperation, becoming its chairman for multiple times.

In 1975, Indonesia would invade and occupy East Timor until 1999. Throughout the New Order period, Indonesian foreign policy would promote and gain international recognition for the eventual annexation of East Timor.

Indonesia would also actively promote compliance of existing international law of the sea as prescribed under the UNCLOS, where Indonesia heavily contributed to the newly created 'archipelagic states' concept.

=== Post-Suharto period (1998–now) ===
Present-day Indonesian foreign policy was the reconfirmation of 'Free-and-Active' foreign policy (Politik Luar Negeri Bebas Aktif).

Habibie Administration allowed a referendum to be conducted in East Timor, whether they prefer autonomy in Indonesia or independence.

Indonesia was invited into the Group of 20, as the only Southeast Asian country in the group. In 2022, Indonesia held the G20 presidency with the topic 'Recover Together, Recover Stronger'. In 2023, Indonesia also held ASEAN chairmanship with the theme 'ASEAN Matters: Epicentrum of Growth'.

In 2025, followings several years of bidding and negotiations, Indonesia formally joins BRICS as full members, the first Southeast Asian state to join the bloc.

== Duties and responsibilities ==
The Ministry of Foreign Affairs have statutory responsibilities for Indonesian foreign policy. The head of the Ministry of Foreign Affairs, the Minister of Foreign Affairs, is the President's principal foreign policy advisor. The Ministry advances Indonesian objectives and interests in the world through its primary role in developing and implementing the President's foreign policy. It also provides important services to Indonesian citizens and to foreigners seeking to visit Indonesia. All activities—bilateral programs, consular affairs, Indonesian representation abroad—are paid for by the budget, which represents a little more than 0.30% of the total government budget.

According to Foreign Ministerial Regulation No. 4/2025 concerning the Organization and Management of the Ministry of Foreign Affairs, its purpose includes:

- Formulation, policy-making, and implementation of policies in regard to foreign relations and policies;
- Coordination, synchronization, and control of foreign relations and politics in regard to government institutions;
- Coordination and control of foreign relations and policies conducted by regional governments;
- Formulation, drafting, and providing recommendations in regard to implementing strategic foreign policies and politics;
- Coordination of responsibilities, fostering, and administrative support within the Ministry as well as the Missions abroad;
- Management of state property and wealth which constitute part of the responsibility of the Ministry and Missions;
- Supervision of the execution of duties of the Ministry and the Missions;
- Substantive support within the Ministry; and
- Other functions and responsibilities as tasked by the President.

The Foreign Ministry advances Indonesian foreign policy by promoting (1) 'Maritime diplomacy and strong border'; (2) 'Advancing Indonesian leadership in ASEAN'; (3) 'Advancing Indonesian role in the international community'; (4) 'Stronger economic diplomacy'; (5) 'Prime service and protection of Indonesian citizens (Warga Negara Indonesia), legal entities (Badan Hukum Indonesia), and Indonesian Diaspora'; (6) 'Enhanced foreign policy'; (7) 'Significant national support and commitment for foreign policy and international agreements'; and (8) 'Monitoring efficient diplomatic results.

== Organization ==
The Minister for Foreign Affairs is the head of the Ministry of Foreign Affairs and a member of the Cabinet that answers directly to, and advises, the President of the Republic of Indonesia on matters of Indonesian foreign policy and foreign relations. The minister organizes and supervises the Ministry and its entire staff, included the overseas missions. As of 2020, the Ministry of Foreign Affairs has 3,349 Civil Service employees.

The Ministry is organized into the following structure:

=== Executives ===
- Minister for Foreign Affairs (Indonesian: Menteri Luar Negeri), who heads the Ministry; and
- Vice Minister for Foreign Affairs (Indonesian: Wakil Menteri Luar Negeri), who assists the Minister in (i) formulating and implementing Indonesian foreign policy, and (ii) coordinating all high-level strategic activities of the Ministry.

=== Secretariat ===
- Secretariat General (Indonesian: Sekretariat Jenderal), tasked with coordinating the Ministry workflow, organizational fostering, and providing administrative support within the Ministry. Led by secretary general Denny Abdi, who took office since 17 September 2025, the secretariat general oversees several bureaus, as follows:
  - Office of the Minister for Foreign Affairs (Biro Dukungan Strategis Pimpinan);
  - Bureau of Administration of Ministry and Missions (Biro Administrasi Kementerian dan Perwakilan);
  - Bureau of Planning and Organization (Biro Perencanaan dan Organisasi);
  - Bureau of Human Resource (Biro Sumber Daya Manusia);
  - Bureau of Finance (Biro Keuangan);
  - Bureau of Legal Affairs (Biro Hukum); and
  - Bureau of General Affairs and Procurement (Biro Umum dan Pengadaan).

=== Directorates general ===
- Directorate General of Asia-Pacific and African Affairs (Indonesian: Direktorat Jenderal Asia Pasifik dan Afrika), tasked with formulating and implementing Indonesian foreign policy in the form of bilateral, intraregional, and interregional interests in the region of Asia-Pacific and Africa. Led by director general Santo Darmosumarto, who took office since 18 December 2025, the DG oversees several subsections, as follows:
  - DG Secretariat;
  - Directorate of Southeast Asian Affairs (Direktorat Asia Tenggara);
  - Directorate of East Asian Affairs (Direktorat Asia Timur);
  - Directorate of Pacific and Oceanian Affairs (Direktorat Pasifik dan Oseania);
  - Directorate of South and Central Asian Affairs (Direktorat Asia Selatan dan Tengah);
  - Directorate of Middle-Eastern Affairs (Direktorat Timur Tengah);
  - Directorate of African Affairs (Direktorat Afrika); and
  - Directorate of Asia-Pacific and African Intra- and Inter-regional Cooperation (Direktorat Kerja Sama Intrakawasan dan Antarkawasan Asia Pasifik dan Afrika).
- Directorate General of American and European Affairs (Indonesian: Direktorat Jenderal Amerika dan Eropa), tasked with formulating and implementing Indonesian foreign policy in the form of bilateral, intraregional, and interregional interests in the region of the Americas and Europe. Led by director general Grata Endah Werdaningtyas, who took office since 18 December 2025, the DG oversees several subsections, as follows:
  - DG Secretariat;
  - Directorate of American Affairs I (Direktorat Amerika I), in charge of North and Central America;
  - Directorate of American Affairs II (Direktorat Amerika II), in charge South America and the Caribbean;
  - Directorate of European Affairs I (Direktorat Eropa I), in charge of Western and Southern Europe;
  - Directorate of European Affairs II (Direktorat Eropa II), in charge of Northern, Central, and Eastern Europe; and
  - Directorate of European and American Intra- and Inter-regional Cooperation (Direktorat Kerja Sama Intrakawasan dan Antarkawasan Amerika dan Eropa).
- Directorate General of ASEAN Cooperation (Indonesian: Direktorat Jenderal Kerja Sama ASEAN), tasked with formulating and implementing Indonesian foreign policy in the form of ASEAN cooperation. Led by director general Ina Hagniningtyas Krisnamurthi, who took office since 18 December 2025, the DG oversees several subsections, as follows:
  - DG Secretariat;
  - Directorate of ASEAN Political and Security Cooperation (Direktorat Kerja Sama Politik Keamanan ASEAN);
  - Directorate of ASEAN Economic Cooperation (Direktorat Kerja Sama Ekonomi ASEAN);
  - Directorate of ASEAN Socio-cultural Cooperation (Direktorat Kerja Sama Sosial Budaya ASEAN); and
  - Directorate of ASEAN External Cooperation (Direktorat Kerja Sama Eksternal ASEAN).
- Directorate General of Multilateral Cooperation (Indonesian: Direktorat Jenderal Kerja Sama Multilateral), tasked with formulating and implementing Indonesian foreign policy in the form of multilateral cooperation. Led by director general Denny Abdi, who took office in an acting capacity since 27 April 2026, the DG oversees several subsections, as follows:
  - DG Secretariat;
  - Directorate of International Peace and Security (Direktorat Keamanan dan Perdamaian Internasional);
  - Directorate of Human Rights and Migration (Direktorat Hak Asasi Manusia dan Migrasi);
  - Directorate of Economic Development and Environmental Affairs (Direktorat Pembangunan, Ekonomi, dan Lingkungan Hidup);
  - Directorate of Socio-cultural Affairs and Strategic Partnership (Direktorat Sosial Budaya dan Kemitraan Strategis).
- Directorate General of Law and International Treaty (Indonesian: Direktorat Jenderal Hukum dan Perjanjian Internasional), tasked with formulating and implementing Indonesian foreign policy in the form of international law and international treaties enforcement. Led by director general Ricky Suhendar, who took office since 9 April 2026, the DG oversees several subsections, as follows:
  - DG Secretariat;
  - Directorate of Legal Affairs and Territorial Treaties (Direktorat Hukum dan Perjanjian Kewilayahan);
  - Directorate of Legal Affairs and Economic Treaties (Direktorat Hukum dan Perjanjian Ekonomi);
  - Directorate of Legal Affairs and Socio-cultural Treaties (Direktorat Hukum dan Perjanjian Sosial Budaya); and
  - Directorate of Legal Affairs and Political and Security Treaties (Direktorat Hukum dan Perjanjian Politik dan Keamanan).
- Directorate General of Economic Relations and Development Cooperation (Indonesian: Direktorat Jenderal Hubungan Ekonomi dan Kerja Sama Pembangunan), tasked with formulating and implementing Indonesian foreign policy in the form of economic cooperation in international trade, investment, finance, environment, and development cooperation. Led by director general Daniel Simanjuntak, who took office since 17 September 2025, the DG oversees several subsections, as follows:
  - DG Secretariat;
  - Directorate of International Trade (Direktorat Perdagangan Internasional);
  - Directorate of Investment and Creative Economy (Direktorat Investasi dan Ekonomi Kreatif);
  - Directorate of Resource and Industrialization (Direktorat Sumber Daya dan Industrialisasi); and
  - Directorate of International Development Cooperation (Direktorat Kerja Sama Pembangunan Internasional).
- Directorate General of Information and Public Diplomacy (Indonesian: Direktorat Jenderal Informasi dan Diplomasi Publik), tasked with formulating and implementing Indonesian foreign policy in the form of information and media management, public diplomacy, and Indonesian diaspora. Led by director general Kamapradipta Isnomo, who took office in an acting capacity since 1 October 2026, the DG oversees several subsections, as follows:
  - DG Secretariat;
  - Directorate of Information and Media Services (Direktorat Informasi dan Media);
  - Directorate of Public Diplomacy (Direktorat Diplomasi Publik);
  - Directorate of Diaspora Affairs (Direktorat Urusan Diaspora).
- Directorate General of Protocol and Consular Affairs (Indonesian: Direktorat Jenderal Protokol dan Konsuler), tasked with formulating and implementing Indonesian foreign policy in the form of providing protocol service, consular service, diplomatic facilities, as well as protecting Indonesian citizens overseas. The director general also serves ex officio as chief of state protocol of Indonesia (Kepala Protokol Negara). Led by director general Saud Purwanto Krisnawan, who took office since 9 April 2026, the DG oversees several subsections, as follows:
  - DG Secretariat;
  - Directorate of Protocol Affairs (Direktorat Protokol);
  - Directorate of Consular Affairs (Direktorat Konsuler);
  - Directorate of Diplomatic Facilities (Direktorat Fasilitas Diplomatik); and
  - Directorate of Protection of Citizens (Direktorat Perlindungan Warga Negara Indonesia).

=== Inspectorate ===
- Inspectorate General (Indonesian: Inspektorat Jenderal), tasked with internal monitoring of the Ministry and the Missions. Led by inspector general Acep Somantri, who took office in an acting capacity since 1 October 2026, the Inspectorate General oversees several subsections, as follows:
  - Secretariat of the Inspectorate General;
  - Regional Inspectorate I (Indonesian missions in Southeast Asia, East Asia, South and Central Asia, Indonesian permanent representative for ASEAN, as well as Directorate General of Asia-Pacific and African Affairs, Directorate General of ASEAN Cooperation, and Foreign Policy Strategy Agency);
  - Regional Inspectorate II (Indonesian missions in Europe, as well as Directorate General of American and European Affairs, Directorate General of Multilateral Cooperation, and Directorate General of Legal and International Treaties);
  - Regional Inspectorate III (Indonesian missions in Africa, Middle East, as well as the Secretariat General and the Inspectorate General); and
  - Regional Inspectorate IV (Indonesian missions in Pacific, the Americas, the Caribbean, as well as Directorate General of Information and Public Diplomacy, Directorate General of Protocol and Consular Affairs, Education and Training Center, IT and Communications Center, and Functionary Management Center).

=== Agency ===
- Foreign Policy Strategy Agency (Indonesian: Badan Strategi Kebijakan Luar Negeri), tasked with tasked with formulating, drafting, and providing recommendation on Indonesian foreign policy strategy. Led by director general Muhammad Takdir, who took office since 17 September 2025, the agency is coordinated under the Secretariat General and oversees several centers, as follows:
  - Agency Secretariat;
  - Center for Policy Strategy for the Asia-Pacific and Africa Region (Pusat Strategi Kebijakan Kawasan Asia Pasifik dan Afrika);
  - Center for Policy Strategy for the Americas and Europe Region (Pusat Strategi Kebijakan Kawasan Amerika dan Eropa);
  - Center for Multilateral Policy Strategy (Pusat Strategi Kebijakan Multilateral); and
  - Center for Policy Strategy for Special Issues and Data Analysis (Pusat Strategi Kebijakan Isu Khusus dan Analisis Data).

=== Advisory staff ===
- Advisor to the Minister on Political, Legal, and Security Affairs (Indonesian: Staf Ahli Bidang Politik, Hukum, dan Keamanan), tasked with providing recommendation on strategic issues to the Minister on matters of politics, law, and security;
- Advisor to the Minister on Economic Diplomacy (Indonesian: Staf Ahli Bidang Diplomasi Ekonomi), tasked with providing recommendation on strategic issues to the Minister on matters of economic diplomacy;
- Advisor to the Minister on Socio-Cultural Affairs and Human Development (Indonesian: Staf Ahli Bidang Sosial, Budaya, dan Pembangunan Manusia), tasked with providing recommendation on strategic issues to the Minister on matters of socio-cultural affairs and human development;
- Advisor to the Minister on Inter-Institutional Relations (Indonesian: Staf Ahli Bidang Hubungan Antarlembaga), tasked with providing recommendation on strategic issues to the Minister on matters of interinstitutional relations; and
- Advisor to the Minister on Management (Indonesian: Staf Ahli Bidang Manajemen), tasked with providing recommendation on strategic issues to the Minister on matters of organizational management.

In addition, the Foreign Minister may be assisted by one or more special advisors (Indonesian: Staf Khusus Menteri Luar Negeri). Unlike the five advisors mentioned above, the special advisors may be appointed from non-civil servants.

=== Centers ===
The following centers is coordinated under the Secretariat General:

- Education and Training Center (Indonesian: Pusat Pendidikan dan Pelatihan), tasked with formulating technical policy, implementing, monitoring, evaluating, managing of learning support facilities, and reporting on matters of training and educating employees of the Ministry and the Missions.
- Data and Information Technology Center (Indonesian: Pusat Data dan Teknologi Informasi), tasked with formulating technical policy, implementing, monitoring, evaluating, and reporting on data and IT development and management, diplomatic digital data, integrated communication system, information security management, and diplomatic cyphers, within the Ministry and the Missions.
- Functionary Management Center (Indonesian: Pusat Pembinaan Jabatan Fungsional), tasked with formulating technical policy, implementing, monitoring, evaluating, and reporting on functionary management within the Ministry.

=== Technical units ===
- Junior Diplomatic School (Unit Pelaksana Teknis Sekolah Dinas Luar Negeri), also known as UPT Sekdilu, organized under the Education and Training Center, tasked with training diplomat candidates into junior diplomats;
- Mid-career Diplomatic School (Unit Pelaksana Teknis Sekolah Staf Dinas Luar Negeri), also known as UPT Sesdilu, organized under the Education and Training Center, tasked with training junior diplomats into mid-career diplomats;
- Senior Diplomatic School (Unit Pelaksana Teknis Sekolah Staf dan Pimpinan Departemen Luar Negeri), also known as UPT Sesparlu, organized under the Education and Training Center, tasked with training mid-career diplomats into senior diplomats; and
- Asian-African Conference Museum (Unit Pelaksana Teknis Museum Konferensi Asia-Afrika) or Museum KAA, organized under the Directorate of Public Diplomacy, tasked with maintaining the historic museum and its milestones in Indonesian foreign relations history.

== Diplomats ==
=== Diplomatic ranks ===
In Indonesia, the professional term "Diplomat" refers to a specific functionary post (Jabatan Fungsional) within the Indonesian Civil Service. Diplomatic ranks for Indonesian diplomats were modified in order to accommodate the classification for Indonesian Civil Service regulations.

Indonesian diplomatic ranks according to Foreign Minister Regulation No. 3/2020
Indonesian rank (in Indonesian)	Indonesian rank (in English)	Traditional rank
Diplomat Ahli Pertama	Junior Diplomat	Attache; Third Secretary
Diplomat Ahli Muda	Mid-career Diplomat	Second Secretary; First Secretary
Diplomat Ahli Madya	Senior Diplomat	Counsellor; Minister-Counsellor; Minister
Diplomat Ahli Utama	Principal Diplomat	Ambassador

=== Education and training ===
Professional diplomats of the Foreign Ministry are part of the Indonesian Civil Service (Aparatur Sipil Negara), and thus trained and educated by the Ministry after passing the National Civil Service Examination (Seleksi Calon Aparatur Sipil Negara) and completing the National Civil Service Basic Training Program (Pelatihan Dasar Calon Aparatur Sipil Negara). The Foreign Ministry's Education and Training Center offers three education and training programs for diplomats to participate in:

1. Junior Diplomatic School (Sekolah Dinas Luar Negeri, abbreviated as Sekdilu), aimed for diplomat candidates to rise to junior diplomats;
2. Mid-career Diplomatic School (Sekolah Staf Dinas Luar Negeri, abbreviated as Sesdilu), aimed for junior diplomats to rise to mid-career diplomats; and
3. Senior Diplomatic School (Sekolah Staf dan Pimpinan Luar Negeri, abbreviated as Sesparlu), aimed for mid-career diplomats to rise to senior diplomats, in order to fill in key leadership positions in the Ministry and Missions.

== Foreign Ministry Building Complex ==
The Foreign Ministry Building Complex is located on No. 6 Taman Pejambon Street in Central Jakarta. It is built around the historic Gedung Pancasila, which used to host the Dutch colonial assembly (the Volksraad) and the BPUPK committee during the Japanese occupation, as well as the Gedung Garuda next door, which used to host the Council of the Indies (the Raad van Indie).

The ministry also maintained several off-site locations, such as the Education and Training Center complex in Senayan, South Jakarta. The Societeit Concordia Bandung, better known as the Asian-African Conference Museum or the Merdeka Building in Bandung, is also maintained and organized under the ministry.

=== 1971 Construction ===
The construction of current modern structures first began on 7 January 1971 during the tenure of Foreign Minister Adam Malik. The buildings were designed by a team of architects from Perentjana Djaja. During this phase, four different structure was refurbished or completed:

- a 10-story main operational building, completed in 1975;
- a west-wing building used by ASEAN National Secretariat, completed in 1972;
- an east-wing building, previously occupied by BP7 government institution, used for the library and executive offices, completed in 1974;
- the Gedung Pancasila, which was originally built in 1830, underwent a renovation in 1973 and completed in 1975.
- a dome-shaped fifth structure, which was planned to serve as a meeting hall, was scrapped early.

By 1975, all construction and refurbishment project has been completed. The project was jointly executed by PT. Hutama Karya and PT. Moeladi, with a budget of IDR 2.5 billion per August 1972. President Soeharto and Foreign Minister Adam Malik officially inaugurate the Foreign Ministry Building Complex on 19 August 1975, the 30th anniversary of the Ministry of Foreign Affairs.

=== 1988 fire ===
On the early hours of 10 November 1988, a fire broke out in the East Wing and the Main Building. Firefighters managed to put the fire under control in an hour, with around ten offices heavily damaged. Several agendas of the Ministry have to move their venue or be cancelled.

=== 1991 renovation ===
Following the 1988 fire, several Foreign Ministry units and personnel were forced to work in separate office for some times, such as in Sam Ratulangi office (Menteng) or in Sisingamangaraja office (Kebayoran Baru), which resulted with disturbances and disorganized workflow within the Ministry.

In order to address this issue, a major renovation is planned, with PT. Pasaraya Tosersajaya assigned as the project developer; designs inspired by the original 1970s draft by Perentjana Djaja team were implemented by a team of architects of Parama Loka Consultants. A special attention and consideration was made during designing phase to properly present the Gedung Pancasila as the face of the Ministry. The renovated building would be painted white, rather than the previous light brown.

The renovation was executed by private contractor Total Bangun Persada, with an estimated budget of IDR 40 billion. It began in May 1991 with the cleanup of the fire-damaged East Wing and completed by August 1992, and inaugurated by President Soeharto on 19 August 1992, the 47th anniversary of the Ministry, and just before the opening of the 1992 Non-Aligned Movement Summit in Jakarta.

=== Recent development ===
In March 2021, the renovation for Integrated Public Service Building (Gedung Pelayanan Publik Terpadu) is completed and inaugurated by Foreign Minister Retno Marsudi.

The Ministry will be one of the first government ministries to be moved to the new capital in Nusantara, with asset and personnel transfer might happen as early as 2024. As of 2026, no personnel transfer has been executed.

Following a 10-month long renovation, Gedung Pancasila has been reopened by Foreign Minister Marsudi on 19 August 2024.

== List of diplomatic and consular missions ==
The Ministry of Foreign Affairs currently maintains 132 diplomatic and consular missions (Perwakilan Republik Indonesia), which consist of:

- 95 embassies (Kedutaan Besar Republik Indonesia, abbreviated to KBRI);
- 30 consulates-general (Konsulat Jenderal Republik Indonesia, abbreviated to KJRI);
- 4 consulates (Konsulat Republik Indonesia, abbreviated to KRI); and
- 3 offices of permanent representatives (Perutusan Tetap Republik Indonesia, abbreviated to PTRI) for the United Nations (New York City and Geneva) and ASEAN (Jakarta).

== List of foreign ministers ==
#	Minister		Term in office			Cabinet
#	Portrait	Name	Term start	Term end	Term length	Cabinet
1		Achmad Soebardjo	19 August 1945	14 November 1945	87 days	Presidential
2		Sutan Sjahrir as Prime Minister and Foreign Minister	14 November 1945	3 July 1947	231 days	Sjahrir I; Sjahrir II; Sjahrir III
3		Agus Salim	3 July 1947	19 December 1948	2 years, 169 days	Amir Sjarifuddin I; Amir Sjarifuddin II; Hatta I
—		Sjafruddin Prawiranegara as Chair of the Emergency Government and interim Foreign Minister	19 December 1948	31 March 1949	102 days	Emergency
—		Alexander Andries Maramis	31 March 1949	13 July 1949	104 days	Emergency
(3)		Agus Salim	4 August 1949	14 December 1949	132 days	Hatta II
—		Hamengkubuwana IX as Acting Prime Minister and Acting Foreign Minister	21 October 1949	14 December 1949	54 days	Hatta II
—		Mohammad Hatta as Prime Minister of RUSI and Foreign Minister	20 December 1949	6 September 1950	260 days	Federal
4		Mohammad Roem	6 September 1950	20 March 1951	195 days	Natsir
(1)		Achmad Soebardjo	4 August 1951	20 December 1952	1 year, 138 days	Sukiman-Suwirjo
5		Wilopo as Prime Minister and Foreign Minister	3 April 1952	29 April 1952	26 days	Wilopo
6		Moekarto Notowidigdo	29 April 1952	30 July 1953	1 year, 92 days	Wilopo
7		Soenario Sastrowardoyo	30 July 1953	12 August 1955	2 years, 13 days	Ali Sastroamidjojo I
8		Ida Anak Agung Gde Agung	12 August 1955	24 March 1956	225 days	Burhanuddin Harahap
9		Ruslan Abdulgani	24 March 1956	9 April 1957	1 year, 16 days	Ali Sastroamidjojo II
10		Subandrio	9 April 1957	28 March 1966	8 years, 353 days	Djuanda; Working I; Working II; Working III; Working IV; Dwikora I; Dwikora II
11		Adam Malik	28 March 1966	1 October 1977	11 years, 187 days	Dwikora II; Dwikora III; Ampera I; Ampera II; Development I; Development II
—		Syarif Thayeb as Acting Foreign Minister	1 October 1977	23 March 1978	173 days	Development II
12		Mochtar Kusumaatmadja	29 March 1978	21 March 1988	9 years, 358 days	Development III; Development IV
13		Ali Alatas	21 March 1988	20 October 1999	11 years, 213 days	Development V; Development VI; Development VII; Development Reform
14		Alwi Shihab	29 October 1999	23 July 2001	1 year, 267 days	National Unity
15		Hassan Wirajuda	9 August 2001	20 October 2009	8 years, 72 days	Mutual Assistance; United Indonesia I
16		Marty Natalegawa	22 October 2009	20 October 2014	4 years, 363 days	United Indonesia II
17		Retno Marsudi	27 October 2014	20 October 2024	9 years, 359 days	Working; Onward Indonesia
18		Sugiono	21 October 2024	1 October 2026	1 year, 345 days	Red White
19		Arrmanatha Nasir	1 October 2026	Present	4 days	Red White

== See also ==
- Foreign relations of Indonesia

== Literature ==
- Nabbs-Keller, Greta (April 2013). "Reforming Indonesia's Foreign Ministry: Ideas, Organization and Leadership". Contemporary Southeast Asia. 35 (1): 56–82. doi:10.1355/cs35-1c. hdl:10072/55369. S2CID 153685416.
