= Kusumasmoro =

Indonesian diplomat (1924–1998)

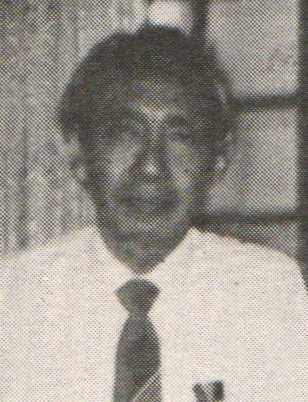

Ambassador of Indonesia to Kenya, Seychelles, and Uganda
- In office 1985–1989
- President: Soeharto
- Preceded by: Supangat
- Succeeded by: Dalindra Aman

Ambassador of Indonesia to Argentina, Chile, and Uruguay
- In office 27 March 1976 – 1979
- President: Soeharto
- Preceded by: Joesoef Ronodipoero
- Succeeded by: Anak Agung Gede Oke Djelantik

Personal details
- Born: 14 October 1924 Semarang, Dutch East Indies
- Died: 24 May 1998 (aged 73)
- Spouse: Tati Srikanti
- Children: 1
- Education: Foreign Service Academy; Howard University (MA)

Raden Kusumasmoro (14 October 1924 – 24 May 1998) was an Indonesian career diplomat who served as ambassador to Argentina from 1976 to 1979, and ambassador to Kenya from 1985 to 1989. Kusumasmoro had served in various postings, including as director of socio-cultural relations and director of America.

== Diplomatic career ==
Born in Semarang on 14 October 1924, Kusumasmoro completed high school (Algemeene Middelbare School) in natural sciences section at his birthplace. Kusumasmoro entered the Foreign Service Academy in 1949. He passed his propadeutics in 1951 and graduated in 1953. He entered the foreign service that year and by 1955 was posted at the embassy in Rome for two years with the diplomatic rank of attaché. He was then sent to the embassy in Mexico City for a year's stint, having been promoted to third secretary, and served under chargé d'affaires ad interim Ismail Thajeb. Kusumasmoro studied foreign languages. during his posting in Rome and Mexico City.

From Mexico, Kusumasmoro returned to the foreign department for domestic assignment. In 1962, he took on overseas posting at the embassy in Washington, beginning with the diplomatic rank of second secretary. During this period, he pursued his master's studies at the Howard University, and graduated in 1965. By the time he left Washington, Kusumasmoro had already reached the diplomatic rank of counsellor. During this period, Kusumasmoro made responses to articles on Indonesia's current condition in The New York Times.

Kusumasmoro underwent a four-year domestic assignment after he was recalled from Washington, where he authored a number of articles on philosophy in Mimbar Indonesia. He had a brief stint at the embassy in Ottawa from 1970 to 1971, during which he reached the rank of minister counsellor. From 1972 to 1974, Kusumasmoro was sent to the permanent mission to the United Nations in New York, as the third ranked official with the diplomatic rank of minister. He was then recalled to the foreign department as director of America.

After receiving approval from the respective countries in February, on 27 March 1976 Kusumasmoro became Indonesia's ambassador to Argentina, with concurrent accreditation to Chile and Uruguay. He presented his credentials to president Jorge Rafael Videla of Argentina on 27 May. On 30 May 1979, a reception was held to bid farewell to Kusumasmoro, who was recalled to the foreign ministry. He then assumed new duties as director of socio-cultural relations for six years, during which he represented the government in sending off and receiving foreign aid.

On 30 September 1985, Kusumasmoro was installed as ambassador to Kenya, with concurrent accreditation to Seychelles as well as permanent representative to the United Nations Environment Programme and the UN Centre for Human Settlements. He presented his credentials to president France-Albert René of Seychelles sometime in 1987. At the end of his term, on 12 January 1989 Kusumasmoro and his Ugandan counterpart signed an agreement on the establishment of Indonesia–Uganda diplomatic relations. Following his departure from Kenya, Kusumasmoro became director of senior diplomatic education, his last duty before retirement. He taught diplomats and would sometimes threw jokes in his lectures. Among his students were future ambassador to the Holy See and the Netherlands, Laurentius Amrih Jinangkung. Upon retiring, he received the Star of Service, 1st class from the Indonesian government on 7 August 1995. Kusumasmoro died on 24 May 1998.

== Personal life ==
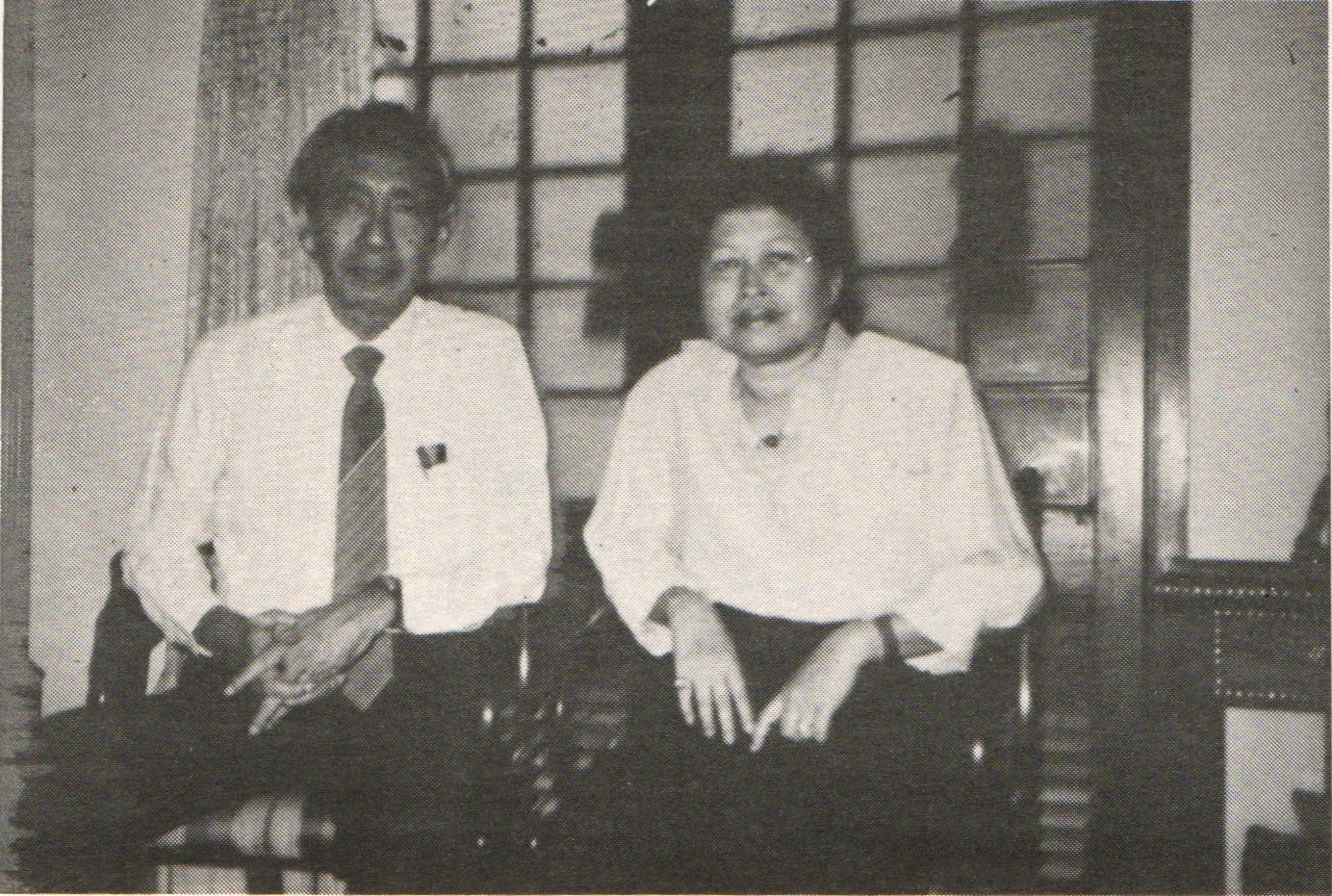
Kusumasmoro and Tati.

Kusumasmoro was married to Tati Srikanti and has a daughter named Amanda Melati.
