= Antonius Agus Sriyono =

Indonesian diplomat (1957–2026)

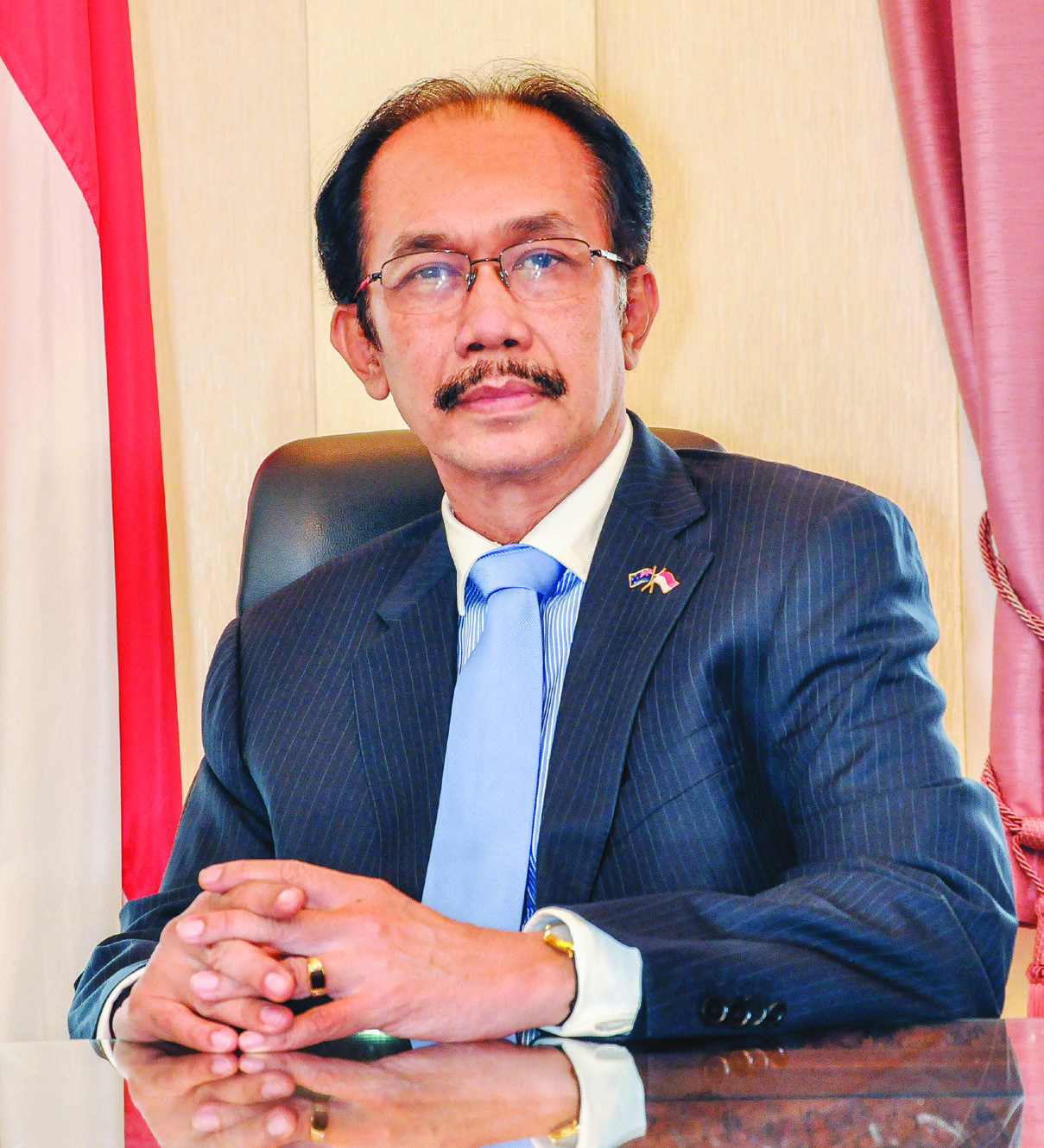

Ambassador of Indonesia to the Holy See
- In office 13 January 2016 – 1 July 2020
- Preceded by: Budiarman Bahar
- Succeeded by: Laurentius Amrih Jinangkung

Deputy for Foreign Policy Coordination
- In office 1 October 2013 – 7 June 2016
- Preceded by: Nadjib Riphat Kesoema
- Succeeded by: Lutfi Rauf

Ambassador of Indonesia to New Zealand
- In office 10 August 2010 – August 2013
- Preceded by: Amris Hassan
- Succeeded by: Jose Antonio Tavares

Personal details
- Born: 17 May 1957 Magelang, Central Java, Indonesia
- Died: 4 June 2026 (aged 69) Bekasi, West Java, Indonesia
- Spouse: Astuti Retno Widiati
- Children: 3
- Education: Gadjah Mada University (Drs.)

Antonius Agus Sriyono (17 May 1957 – 4 June 2026) was an Indonesian diplomat who served as ambassador to New Zealand from 2010 to 2013 and to the Holy See from 2016 to 2020. Between his two ambassadorial terms, Antonius was the deputy for foreign policy coordination in the Office of the Coordinating Ministry for Political, Legal, and Security Affairs from 2013 to 2016.

== Early life and education ==
Antonius Agus Sriyono was born on 17 May 1957 in Magelang. His father, a school principal, possessed a deep fascination with global politics and international relations. From a young age, Sriyono spent his time alongside his father listening to international radio broadcasts from the BBC and Voice of America, and reading books on global affairs, which sparked his childhood ambition to become a diplomat by the time he was in junior high school. His dreams ran contrary to his parents, who wanted him to follow their paths as a teacher. He decided to take the language and culture specialization at the De Britto high school, where he studied French and advanced his English language skills.

Sriyono was an avid author and began writing his first year of high school. His first short story, Odessa, was about an Indonesian robber who fled to the city. After completing high school in 1975, Sriyono pursued higher education at Gadjah Mada University, where he majored in international relations. Since then, and even after pursuing his diplomatic career, he contributed articles to prominent media outlets such as Sarinah, The Jakarta Post, Jakarta Globe, and Kompas. Sriyono graduated with a doctorandus in 1981.

== Diplomatic career ==
Sriyono briefly worked as a public relations officer in Ciputra Group for three years and at the Prasetiya Mulya University. He joined the foreign department in 1984 and completed basic diplomatic education from 1984 to 1985, where his classmates included future deputy foreign minister Abdurrahman Mohammad Fachir and future deputy ASEAN secretary general Bagas Hapsoro. His diplomatic service began as a protocol staff at the state palace. After two years of service, he was sent to The Hague, where he was put in charge of information affairs with the diplomatic rank of third secretary, serving from 1987 to 1991. He served under ambassador Mohammad Romly, whom he credited for teaching him humility. After his maiden overseas assignment, he was assigned as an aide to foreign minister Ali Alatas, which he described as his hero.

From being one of the foreign minister's secretaries, in 1994 Sriyono moved to the Indonesia's permanent mission to the United Nations in New York with the rank of first secretary. Sriyono served under permanent representative Nugroho Wisnumurti, whom he commended for his intellectual prowess. During his tenure there, Sriyono was one of Indonesia's delegate to the general assemblies of the United Nations. His posting in New York concluded in 1998 and he was recalled to Jakarta for an assignment at the directorate of international organizations, becoming one of the directorate's deputy director in 2000. During this period, he completed his mid-level and senior diplomatic education in 1999 and 2000, respectively.

In 2001, Sriyono, now with the rank of minister counsellor, was sent to the newly opened embassy in Portugal. At that time, Indonesia has just restored its diplomatic relations with Portugal, which were non-existent in relation to its occupation of East Timor. Sriyono, who headed the embassy's political section, credited the ambassador Harry Haryono with his legal insights. During his tenure, Sriyono organized the first ever Indonesian photo exhibition in Portugal in 2003. Following a three-year stint in the embassy, on 6 April 2004 Sriyono became the chief of planning and organization bureau of the foreign department. Sriyono was replaced on 24 April 2008 by Sritomo Wirodihardjo. Sriyono's third overseas posting was in Moscow, where he was the deputy chief of mission under ambassador Hamid Awaludin—previously the law minister under president Susilo Bambang Yudhoyono. His posting in Moscow allowed him to visit Odessa, the city that had inspired a short story he wrote 36 years prior as a high schooler about a robber fleeing to the city.

=== Ambassador to New Zealand ===
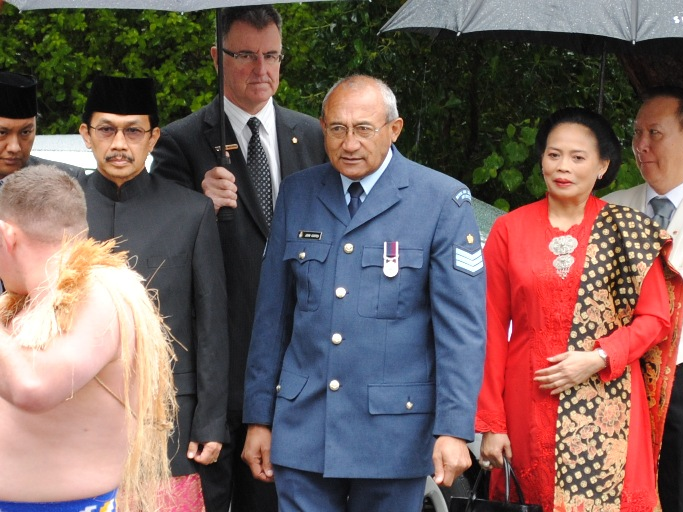
Agus and his wife at the presentation of his credentials to the governor general of New Zealand, 2010.

Two years into his office as bureau chief, on 10 August 2010 Sriyono became the ambassador to New Zealand, with concurrent accreditation to Samoa and Tonga. His colleagues, who congratulated him, said that he'd mostly be either golfing, fishing, or sleeping throughout his assignment. Sriyono presented his credentials to governor general Anand Satyanand on 30 September 2010, O le Ao o le Malo Tui Ātua Tupua Tamasese Efi on 15 February 2011, and to King George Tupou V of Tonga on 21 March 2011. Sriyono's stated focus was to increase the amount of Indonesian workers and post-graduate students in New Zealand as well as reversing Indonesia's trade deficit with New Zealand. Sriyono encouraged, among others, the Fonterra dairy company to invest in Indonesia. In response to a visit by Papuan freedom leader Benny Wenda to New Zealand in 2013, Sriyono remarked about reports of violence in Papua being exaggerated and that the "world cannot turn back the clock and change history" on the Act of Free Choice.

=== Deputy for foreign policy coordination ===
Sriyono left New Zealand in August 2013, and on 1 October 2013 he was appointed the deputy for foreign policy coordination in the office of the coordinating minister for political, legal, and security affairs. As deputy, Sriyono emphasized Indonesia's role in moderating the South China Sea dispute as a non-involved party and urged Israel to respect UNRWA's diplomatic immunity in carrying out its duties to assist Palestinian refugees. Shortly after being installed for a second ambassadorial term, on 7 June 2016 Sriyono was replaced by Lutfi Rauf.

=== Ambassador to Vatican ===
Sriyono became Indonesia's ambassador to the Holy See on 13 January 2016 after being nominated by president Joko Widodo the August before and passing his parliamentary assessment in September. He arrived on 21 February and presented his credentials to Pope Francis on 21 March, during which the Pope expressed his interest in visiting Indonesia for the Asian Youth Day, which would gather Catholics from all over Asia in Yogyakarta in 2017. At the end of his term, on 28 January 2020 Sriyono met with Vatican's Secretary of State Pietro Parolin to deliver Joko Widodo's invitation for Pope Francis to visit Indonesia. In a farewell tête-à-tête meeting with Sriyono on 9 May 2020, the Pope expressed his wishes to visit Indonesia, provided that the COVID-19 pandemic subsided. Sriyono departed for Indonesia on 1 July that year. Pope Francis would make a apostolic trip to Indonesia few years later on 2024.

As ambassador, Sriyono prioritized cultural and political diplomacy, with his main political agenda being to align Indonesia and the Vatican on a shared support for a two-state solution regarding Palestine. Culturally, he focused on enhancing interfaith dialogue, seeking to expand existing programs by engaging a broader spectrum of religious groups and highlighting Indonesia's identity as a Muslim-majority nation that empowers moderates. During his tenure, he managed relations with approximately 1,600 Indonesian religious personnel residing in Rome and the Vatican, and worked to promote cross-religious harmony. For his ambassadorial works, Pope Francis conferred him the Knight Grand Cross of the Order of Pope Pius IX on 13 March 2019.

== Personal life and death ==
Sriyono was married to Astuti Retno Widiati. The couple had three children (two sons and a daughter) and grandchildren. His eldest son, Anindityo Adi Primasto, followed his footsteps as a diplomat, while his second son works as a journalist for Tempo. After his retirement, Sriyono taught at the Prasetiya Mulya University and joined the university's Center for Indonesian National Studies, as well as becoming a member of the board of donors for the Atma Jaya University, Yogyakarta.

Sriyono died at the Primaya Hospital in West Bekasi, Bekasi, on 4 June 2026, at the age of 69. A requiem was held to honor him at the Elisabeth Hospital funeral house a day later.
