= Retno Marsudi =

Indonesian diplomat and politician

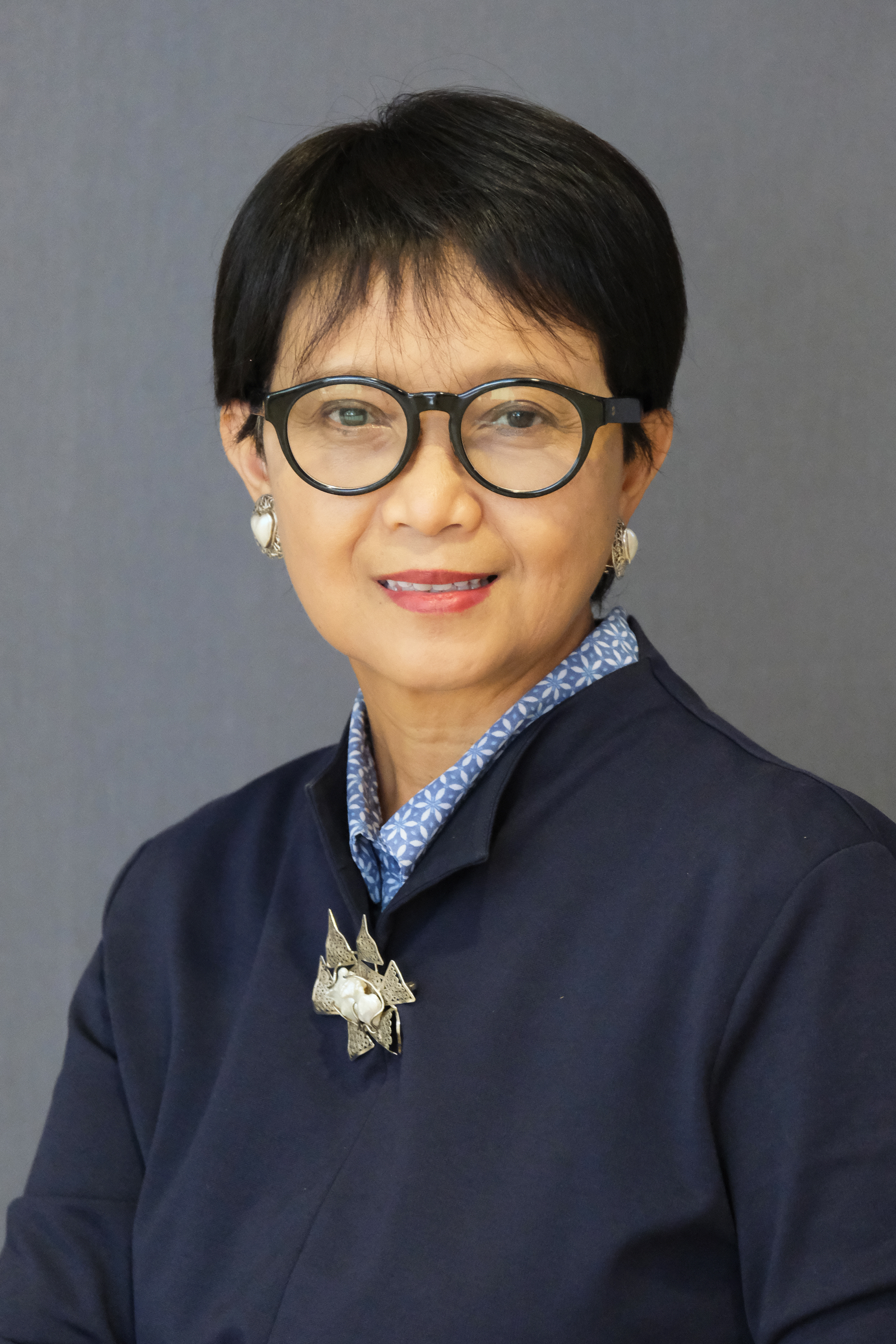
- Official portrait, 2021

United Nations Special Envoy on Water
- Incumbent
- Assumed office 1 November 2024
- Preceded by: Position established

17th Minister of Foreign Affairs
- In office 27 October 2014 – 20 October 2024
- President: Joko Widodo
- Vice Minister: A.M. Fachir; Mahendra Siregar
- Preceded by: Marty Natalegawa
- Succeeded by: Sugiono

Ambassador of Indonesia to the Netherlands and the OPCW
- In office 21 December 2011 – 27 October 2014
- Preceded by: Junus Effendi Habibie
- Succeeded by: Ibnu Wahyutomo (acting); I Gusti Agung Wesaka Puja

Director General of America and Europe
- In office 24 April 2008 – January 2012
- Preceded by: Eddi S. Hariyadhi
- Succeeded by: Dian Triansyah Djani

Ambassador of Indonesia to Norway and Iceland
- In office 2005–2008
- Preceded by: Hatanto Reksodiputro
- Succeeded by: Esti Andayani

Personal details
- Born: Retno Lestari Priansari; 27 November 1962 (age 63) Semarang, Indonesia
- Party: Independent
- Spouse: Agus Marsudi
- Children: Dyota Marsudi; Bagas Marsudi
- Education: Gadjah Mada University (S.I.P.); The Hague University of Applied Sciences (LL.M.)

Retno Lestari Priansari Marsudi (born 27 November 1962) is an Indonesian diplomat who formerly served as the Minister for Foreign Affairs in the Cabinet of Joko Widodo between 2014 and 2024. She is the first female minister appointed to the post. She was previously the Indonesian Ambassador to the Netherlands from 2012 to 2014, as well as Ambassador to Iceland and Norway from 2005 to 2008.

== Early life and education ==
Marsudi was born Retno Lestari Priansari and was born on 27 November 1962 in Semarang, Central Java, as the eldest child and daughter of the five children of Moch Sidik (1934–2016), a high school teacher and veteran soldier, and Retno Werdiningsih (b. 1940), a high school employee. She graduated from SMAN 3 Semarang and continued her study in International Relations, graduating from Gadjah Mada University in 1985. She then pursued a master's degree in International European Law & Policy at The Hague University of Applied Science in 2000. Outside higher education, Retno attended the foreign ministry training program at the Netherlands Institute of International Relations Clingendael and a program in human rights study at the University of Oslo in 2007.

== Diplomatic service ==
Marsudi completed her basic diplomatic education in 1986. She began her career in the foreign ministry began in 1987 as a staff member at the bureau of analysis and evaluation for ASEAN cooperation, where she worked until 1990 before briefly serving as the head of the analysis policy section in the same bureau.

Her first overseas posting was to the embassy in Canberra, Australia, where she served at the press and information section from 1990 to 1992 with the rank of third secretary. By 1992, he was promoted to the diplomatic rank of second secretary. Upon returning to Indonesia, she was appointed as section head for environmental issues at the directorate of multilateral economic cooperation from 1994 to 1997. She completed her mid-level diplomatic education in 1996.

She was posted to the embassy in Den Haag as the deputy head of economic affairs at the embassy with the rank of first secretary in 1997. She was promoted to the diplomatic rank of counselor in 1999 and became the head of economic affairs, serving until 2000.

Following her tenure in the Netherlands, Marsudi returned to the foreign ministry to serve as deputy director (chief of subdirectorate) of UN environmental cooperation within the directorate of multilateral economic cooperation from 2000 to 2001. After completing senior diplomatic education in 2002, she became the director of intra-regional American and European cooperation on 1 March of that year and served until 2003. She subsequently became the director of West Europe from 2004 to 2005. During his tenure as West Europe director, from 2004 to 2005 Marsudi was part of a fact-finding team that investigated the death of human rights activist Munir Said Thalib. She also became a member of the special presidential envoy on Indonesia's debt moratorium in 2005.

=== Norway and Iceland ===
In 2005, Marsudi was appointed as the Indonesian Ambassador to Norway and Iceland. She presented her credentials to King Harald V of Norway on 8 December 2005 and to President Ólafur Ragnar Grímsson of Iceland, on 31 January 2006. During her tenure, she was awarded the Royal Norwegian Order of Merit in December 2011, the first Indonesian to receive the award. She also briefly took up the study of human rights at the University of Oslo. Marsudi returned to Jakarta and was sworn in as director general of European and American affairs on 24 April 2008.

=== Netherlands ===
Marsudi was appointed as Indonesian Ambassador to the Netherlands in 2011 by President Susilo Bambang Yudhoyono. She has also led various multilateral negotiations and bilateral consultations with the EU, ASEM, and FEALAC.

== Minister of Foreign Affairs ==
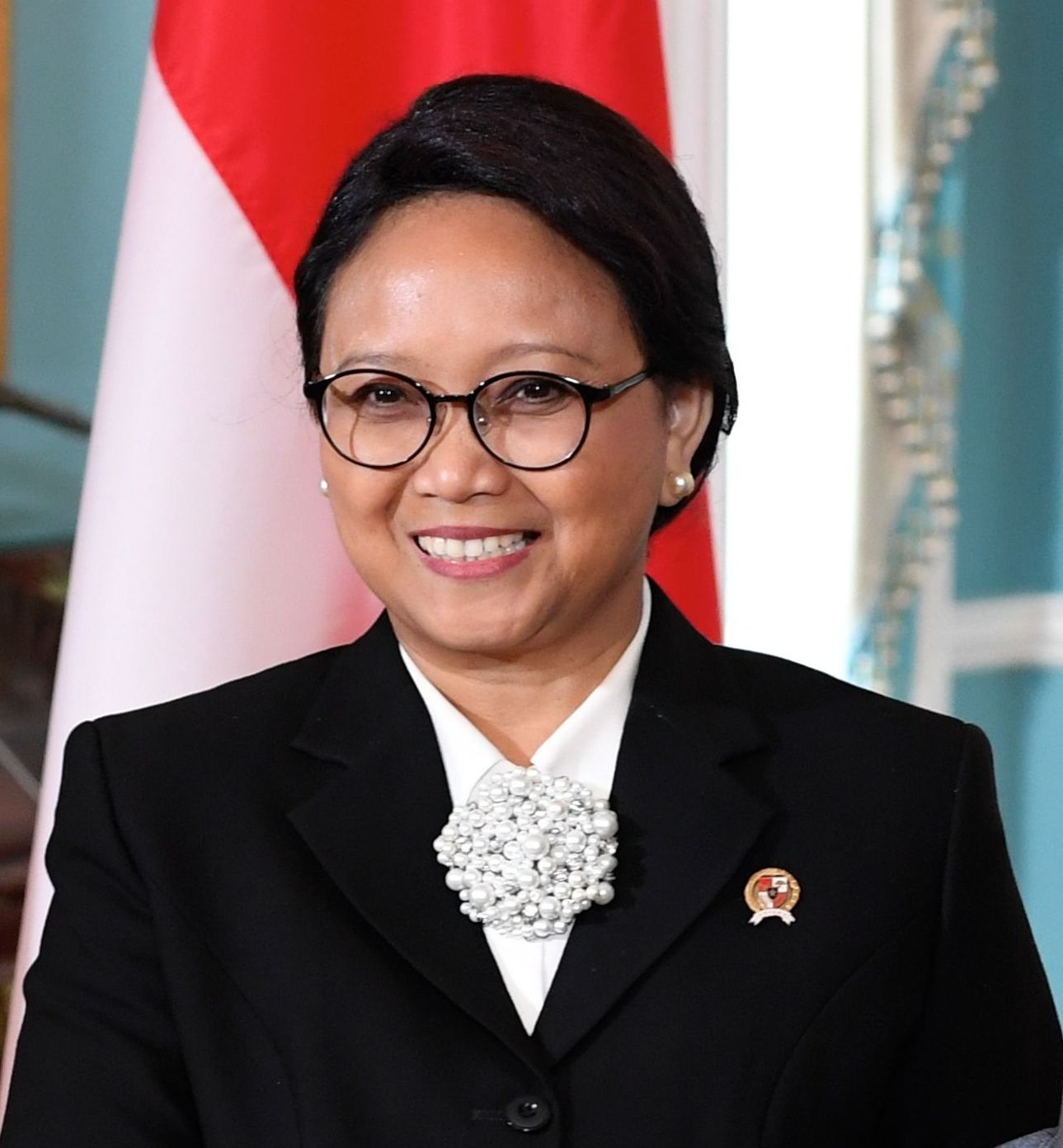
Retno Marsudi in Washington, D.C., 2017.

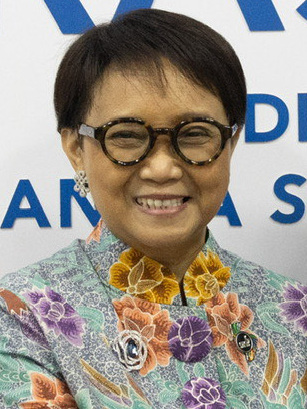
Marsudi in 2024.

=== Appointment ===
On 27 October 2014, Marsudi was appointed Minister of Foreign Affairs by President Joko Widodo in his Working Cabinet. In October 2019, she was re-appointed for a second term as Minister of Foreign Affairs by President Joko Widodo in the Onward Indonesia Cabinet.

=== Covid–19 ===
In 2021, Marsudi was appointed co-chair – alongside Karina Gould and Lia Tadesse – of the COVAX Advance Market Commitment (AMC) Engagement Group; the AMC is a financing instrument established to support the participation of 92 lower-middle and low-income economies in the COVAX Facility and ensure their access to COVID-19 vaccines.

=== Myanmar ===
In 2023, Marsudi headed Indonesia's newly established Office of Special Envoy to Myanmar for ASEAN, where she pushed for the implementation of the Five-Point Consensus (5PC) and sought to engage with "all stakeholders" in the ongoing Myanmar civil war to enable dialogue and find a solution to the crisis. By the end of her tenure, however, little impact was made to ending the violence in the country.

== UN Special Envoy on Water ==
In 2024, United Nations Secretary-General António Guterres appointed Marsudi as his Special Envoy on Water.

== Personal life ==
Marsudi is married to Agus Marsudi, an architect, and has had two sons, Dyota (b. 8 February 1989) and Bagas Marsudi (b. 1993). The two of them then often carry out the agenda of climbing Mount Merapi together once a year.

Dyota is married to Natalia Rialucky Marsudi and has had a son, Manggala Astabrata Marsudi, who was Marsudi's eldest grandson.

== Honours ==
=== National ===
- Indonesia :
  - Star of Mahaputera, 1st Class (25 August 2025)
  - Star of Mahaputera, 2nd Class (11 November 2020)

=== Foreign honours ===
- Afghanistan :
  - Medal of Malalai (1 March 2020)
- Brunei:
  - Sultan of Brunei Golden Jubilee Medal (6 October 2017)
- Netherlands :
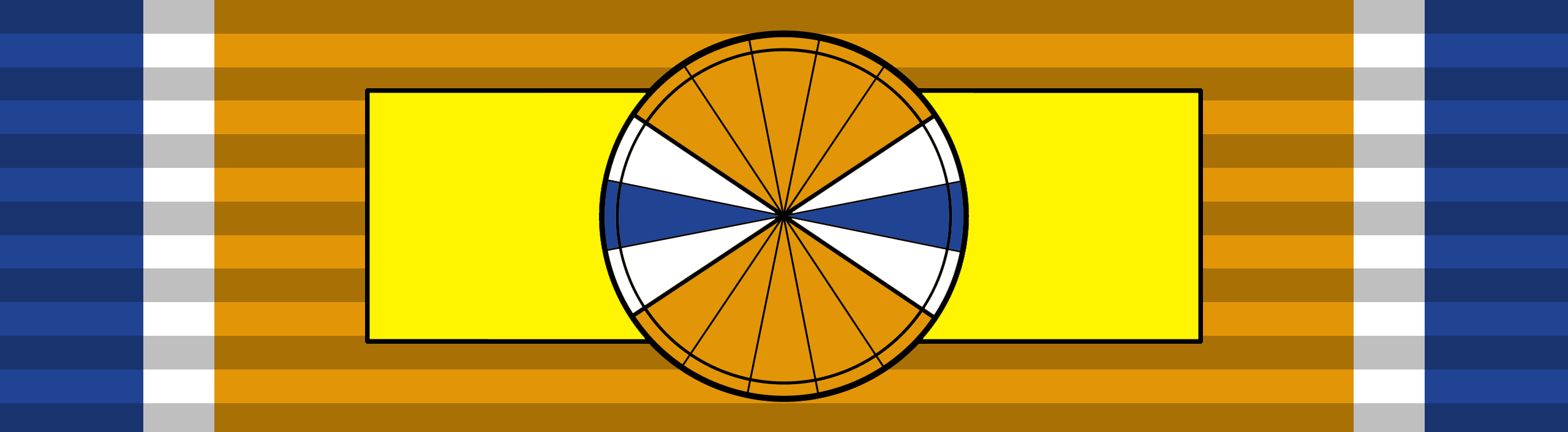
  - Knight Grand Cross of the Order of Orange-Nassau (12 January 2015)
  - Golden Order of Merit of The Netherlands Ministry of Foreign Affairs (16 September 2024)
- Norway :
  - Commander with Star of the Royal Norwegian Order of Merit (15 December 2011)
- Palestine:
  - Star of Merit of the Order of the State of Palestine (19 August 2024)
- Peru :
  - Grand Cross of the Order of the Sun of Peru (24 May 2018)

== See also ==
- List of foreign ministers in 2017
- List of current foreign ministers
- List of female foreign ministers

Political offices
Preceded by Marty Natalegawa	Minister of Foreign Affairs; 2014–2024	Succeeded by Sugiono
