= Indonesia's reaction to the 2008 Kosovo declaration of independence =

Kosovo's declaration of independence from Serbia was enacted on Sunday, 17 February 2008 by a unanimous vote of the Assembly of Kosovo. All 11 representatives of the Serb minority boycotted the proceedings. International reaction was mixed, and the world community continues to be divided on the issue of the international recognition of Kosovo.

== Reaction ==
On 19 February 2008, Ministry of Foreign Affairs spokesman Kristiarto Soeryo Legowo said that the Indonesian government will closely observe developments in Kosovo and is not yet in a position to give its recognition to the unilaterally declared independence. The issue will be debated in parliament among the Indonesian parties.

At the summit of the OIC on 10 March 2008, Indonesia opposed adoption of the document, proposed by Turkey, that would lend support to Kosovo's declaration of independence.

On 27 March 2008, Indonesian Foreign Minister Hassan Wirajuda stated that Indonesia does not see Kosovo as a religious, but as an ethnic and political problem as well as the question of principle of respecting sovereignty and territorial integrity of a UN member. He said that "Indonesia supports a solution to the Kosovo problem with peaceful means, through dialogue and negotiations", and added that "Indonesia supports Serbia's idea that the UN General Assembly asks for opinion from the International Court of Justice on the legality of declaration of independence by Kosovo". On 19 June 2008, during the meeting of the OIC, Indonesia was among countries that opposed the recognition of Kosovo as an independent country.

On 26 August 2008, the Ambassador of Indonesia in Belgrade, Muhammad Dalimunthe, said that "Indonesia stands firmly behind the notion that every move on the international scene must be based on international law, and that is not the case with the unilateral proclamation of Kosovo's independence. Our stance starts with the fact that we respect Serbia's integrity", and that Indonesia insisted among Islamic countries that Kosovo is a political and not a religious issue.

In January 2009, the Indonesian ambassador in Belgrade said that the setting up of the Kosovo Security Force was unnecessary and that Indonesia has not changed its position that it backs UNSCR 1244 which guarantees the territorial integrity of Serbia.

Whilst giving a lecture at the London School of Economics on 31 March 2009, Indonesian President Susilo Bambang Yudhoyono said "for now it is quite possible that Indonesia to accept the independent status of Kosovo after we examine carefully that there is a different situation in Myanmar, after the process of Balkanization you have the independent state of Kosovo" and that "we are still following the situation in Kosovo now and it is quite possible that some day Indonesia recognize the independence of Kosovo".

In August 2009, the Ambassador of Indonesia to Serbia Muhammad Abduh Dalimunthe said that Indonesia respects international law, the integrity of Serbia and all the steps that Serbia has taken with the ICJ regarding the legality of Kosovo's unilaterally proclaimed independence. He also said that every problem must be solved in a peaceful way, that the UNSCR 1244 on Kosovo must be respected and that it is necessary to wait for the decision of the ICJ on Kosovo.

At a meeting in September 2009 between the Kosovan Foreign Minister, Skënder Hyseni, and Nur Hassan Wirajuda, Indonesian Minister of Foreign Affairs, Mr. Wirajuda said that Indonesia was closely looking at Kosovo's request and that a decision would be taken when appropriate.

In February 2010, Yudhoyono said that respect of international law was a foundation of foreign policy for Indonesia, and that his country would not recognise the independence of Kosovo.

In July 2010, the Indonesian Ministry of Foreign Affairs spokesman, Teuku Faizasyah, said the government would look further into the decision. "For the record, the ICJ's ruling was not unanimous and there was dissenting opinion. The ruling was more of a procedural matter and cannot be defined as a recognition of the freedom of Kosovo legally." Defense Ministry spokesman, I Wayan Midhio, said there would not be growing separatist movements affected by the ruling. "A country's sovereignty and integrity is part of its national interest and a country is obliged to improve its people's welfare. When that obligation is missed, separatist movements will rise." He asserted that the 2004 Regional Autonomy Law secured welfare in all regions.

In August 2011, Taufiq Kiemas, the chairman of Indonesia's People's Consultative Assembly, promised to write to Indonesia's president to recommend recognition of Kosovo.

During a visit to Jakarta in April 2016, Serbian President Tomislav Nikolić appreciated Indonesia's stance on Kosovo issues. Aside of supporting Serbian territorial sovereignty, Indonesia also does not recognize Kosovo's membership in some international organizations, including the World Bank.

During a June 2020 visit to Belgrade, Indonesian Law and Human Rights Minister Yasonna Laoly reiterated Indonesia's support for Serbian sovereignty over Kosovo., and as of January 2023, Indonesia remained to oppose the independence of Kosovo.

== See also ==
- International recognition of Kosovo
