= Ibnu Wahyutomo =

Indonesian diplomat (born 1966)

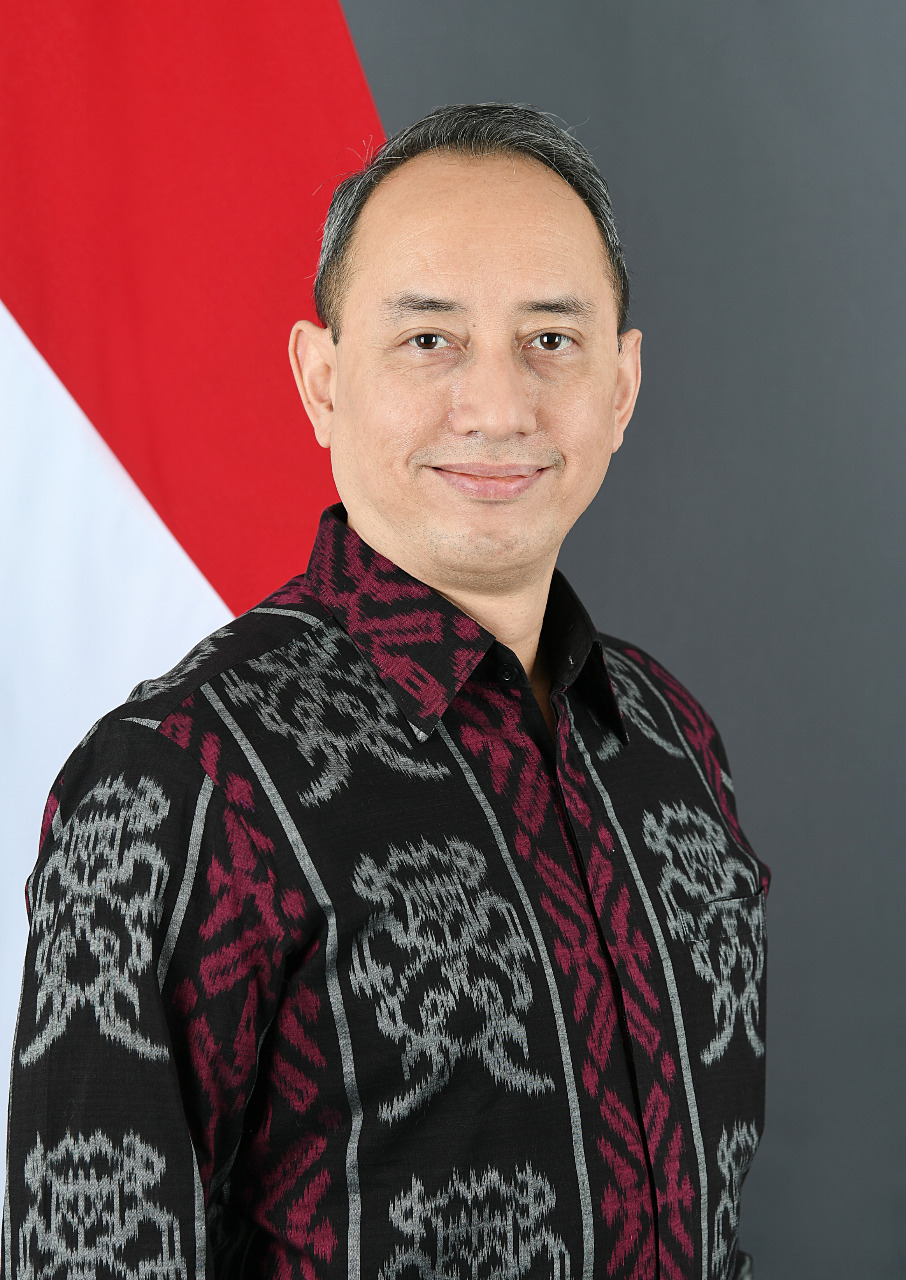

Ambassador of Indonesia to Finland and Estonia
- Incumbent
- Assumed office 24 March 2025
- President: Prabowo Subianto
- Preceded by: Ratu Silvy Gayatri

Inspector General of the Ministry of Foreign Affairs
- In office 18 August 2021 – 13 June 2025
- President: Joko Widodo; Prabowo Subianto
- Preceded by: Rachmat Budiman
- Succeeded by: Laurentius Amrih Jinangkung (acting); Dindin Wahyudin

Director General of Multilateral Cooperation
- Acting
- In office 18 November 2021 – 27 April 2022
- Preceded by: Febrian Alphyanto Ruddyard
- Succeeded by: Tri Tharyat

Ambassador of Indonesia to Portugal
- In office 20 February 2018 – 17 November 2021
- President: Joko Widodo
- Preceded by: Mulya Wirana
- Succeeded by: Rudy Alfonso

Personal details
- Born: 15 March 1966 (age 60) Bantul, Yogyakarta
- Spouse: Restisari Juniarto
- Children: 2
- Education: Gadjah Mada University (S.H.); Duke University School of Law (LL.M.)

Hersindaru Arwityo Ibnu Wiwoho Wahyutomo (born 15 March 1966) is an Indonesian diplomat who is currently serving as the ambassador to Finland, with concurrent accreditation to Estonia. Prior to his appointment, he was the ambassador to Portugal and inspector general of the foreign ministry.

== Early life and education ==
Ibnu was born on 15 March 1966 in Bantul. During high school, he was chosen as the captain of his school's volleyball team. He began studying law at the Gadjah Mada University in 1984, where he chose to become a diplomat at his fourth semester. He received his master of laws in international law and legal studies from the Duke University School of Law.

== Career ==
Ibnu joined the foreign ministry in March 1991. Around 1998, Ibnu was posted at the information and cultural section of the Indonesian embassy in Canada with the rank of third secretary. He served as the embassy's spokesperson. During his tenure, the embassy had to laid off local staff and cut its staff salaries by 25 percent due to the ongoing financial crisis at that time.

Afterwards, in the mid-2000s, Ibnu was posted at the Indonesian consulate general in Osaka, where he served as its consul for economic affairs. He was involved in promoting Indonesian products in the city. He also attempted to climb Mount Fuji during his tenure in Osaka. Ibnu also become the head of chancery in Osaka, handling matters relating to the consulate general's personnel, budget, finance, and equipment matters. He was then assigned to the director of political, security, and territorial treaties, during which he announced that Indonesia still has unresolved border disputes over the years.

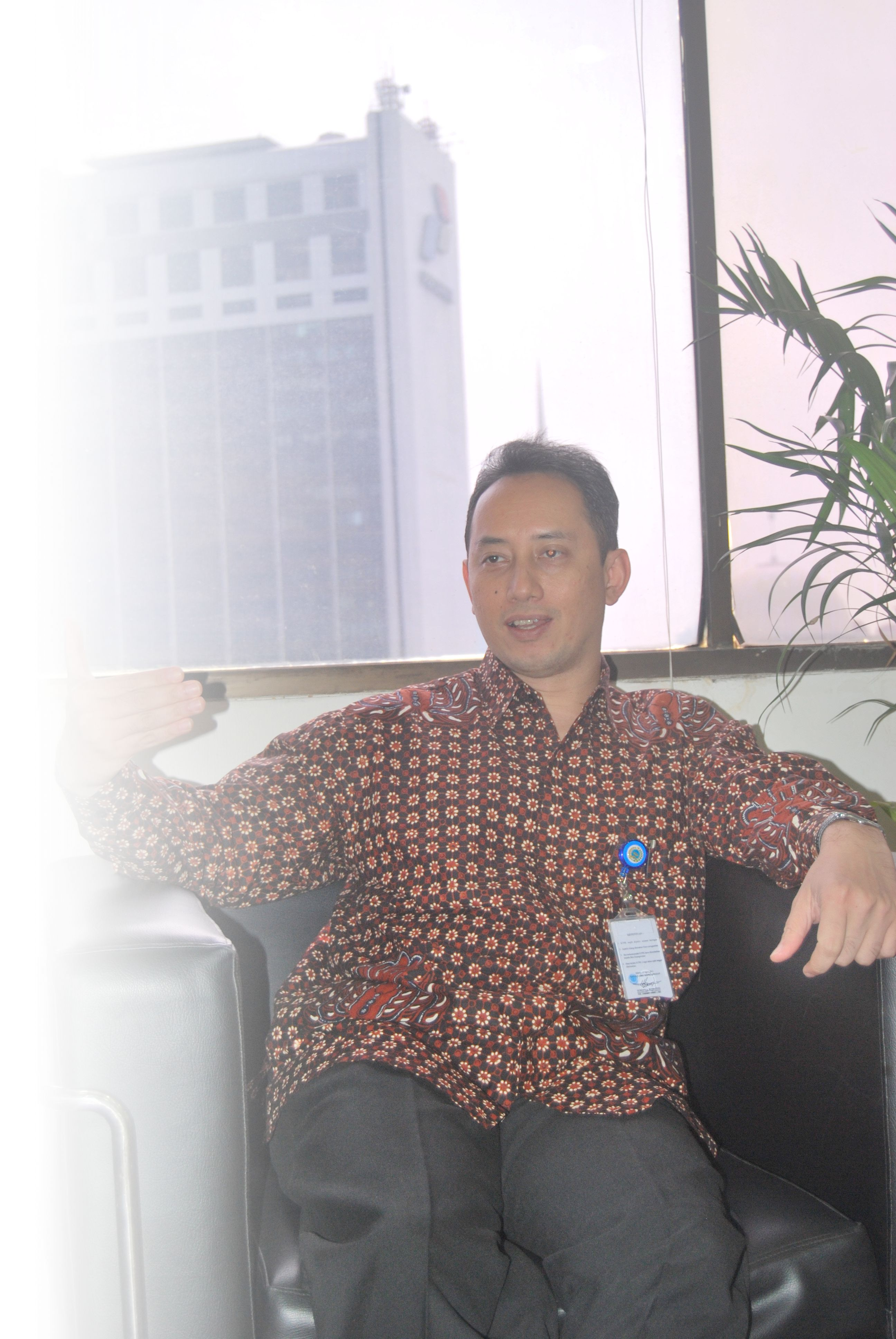
Ibnu Wahyutomo in 2011.

In March 2011, Ibnu became the chief of planning and organization of the foreign ministry's secretariat general, which became his maiden assignment in handling secretarial affairs in the foreign ministry. He worked closely with his similarly named counterpart Ibnu Said, the minister's advisor (expert staff) for management, to implement bureaucratic reforms within the ministry, earning them the nickname "the two Ibnus" (duo Ibnu). He also oversaw the implementation of performance allowance for civil servants in the ministry and the introduction of web conferencing for budget planning coordination.

In 2013, Ibnu became the deputy chief of mission at the Indonesian embassy in The Hague, serving under ambassador Retno Marsudi. Following Retno's appointment as foreign minister, Ibnu became the chargé d'affaires ad interim until the arrival of the new ambassador, I Gusti Agung Wesaka Puja, in early 2016. In October 2017 Ibnu was nominated by President Joko Widodo as ambassador to Portugal. Upon passing an assessment by the House of Representatives, on 20 February 2018 he was installed as ambassador. He presented his credentials to the President of Portugal Marcelo Rebelo de Sousa on 29 May that year.

As ambassador, Ibnu aimed to deepen mutual understanding beyond stereotypes like Cristiano Ronaldo and Bali and attempts to utilize cultural diplomacy through the promotion of Indonesian fashion, music (notably keroncong influenced by Portuguese fado), and film as bridges between the nations. He also oversaw attempt for Indonesia to become an observer member of the Community of Portuguese Language Countries and met with CPLP's executive secretary, Francisco Ribeiro Telles, to initiate the process. Through its past, as well as its observer status in the CPLP, Ibnu attempted to build a strong "trilateral friendship" between Indonesia, Portugal, and Timor-Leste.

On 18 August 2021, Ibnu was installed as the foreign ministry's inspector general. Early in his tenure, in December 2021 the foreign ministry received the Public Service Compliance Standards Award from the ombudsman. He also introduced digitalization initiatives within the foreign ministry to cut costs, obtain real-time follow-ups, simplify the input of supporting data, and speed up reconciliations. These digitalization initiatives were implemented through several applications, such as the e-Audit application, a set of online audit guidelines created during the pandemic, the Internal Oversight Information System, which was launched prior to his term in December 2020, and other supporting apps. Ibnu stated that the initiatives were inspired by his experience on implementing web conferencing for budget planning coordination. Ibnu also briefly served as the acting director general of multilateral affairs between 18 December 2021 to 27 April 2022.

In August 2024, President Joko Widodo nominated Ibnu as Indonesia's ambassador to Finland, with concurrent accreditation to the Estonia. He passed a fit and proper test held by the House of Representative's first commission in September that year and was installed by President Prabowo Subianto on 24 March 2025. Shortly after his installation, he and five other new ambassadors from UGM met with UGM rector Ova Emilia and Yogyakarta governor Hamengkubuwono X. He presented his credentials to the President of Finland Alexander Stubb on 28 August 2025 and to the President of Estonia Alar Karis on 26 November 2025.

== Personal life ==
Ibnu is married to Restisari Joeniarto and has two children.
