= List of permanent representatives of Indonesia to the United Nations in Geneva =

Permanent Representative of the Republic of Indonesia to the United Nations, World Trade Organization and Other International Organizations in Geneva
- Utusan Tetap Republik Indonesia untuk Perserikatan Bangsa-Bangsa, Organisasi Perdagangan Dunia, dan Organisasi Internasional Lainnya di Jenewa
- Emblem of the Ministry of Foreign Affairs

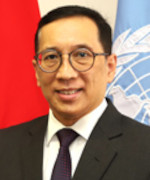
- Incumbent; Febrian Alphyanto Ruddyard since 25 October 2021
- Ministry of Foreign Affairs; Permanent Mission of Indonesia to the United Nations in Geneva
- Style: His Excellency (formal)
- Seat: Geneva, Switzerland
- Appointer: President of Indonesia
- Inaugural holder: Umarjadi Njotowijono
- Formation: 1967
- Website: kemlu.go.id/jenewa-un

The following are the list of Indonesian diplomats that served as Permanent Representative of the Republic of Indonesia to the United Nations Office in Geneva, World Trade Organization, and other international organizations in Geneva.

No.	Permanent Representative	Term start	Term end	Appointed by	Ref.
1	Umarjadi Njotowijono	1967	1971	Sukarno	
2	Ismail Thayeb	1971	1975	Suharto	
3	Ali Alatas	1976	1978	Suharto	
4	Atmono Suryo	1978	1981	Suharto	
5	Irawan Darsa	1981	1984	Suharto	
6	Poedji Koentarso	1985	1988	Suharto	
7	Wisber Loeis	1988	1991	Suharto	
8	Soemadi Djoko Moerdjono Brotodiningrat	1991	1995	Suharto	
9	Agus Tarmidzi	1995	1998	Suharto	
10	Hassan Wirajuda	1998	2000	Bacharuddin Jusuf Habibie	
11	Nugroho Wisnumurti	2000	2004	Abdurrahman Wahid	
12	Makarim Wibisono	2004	2007	Megawati Soekarnoputri	
13	Dian Triansyah Djani	2009	2012	Susilo Bambang Yudhoyono	
14	Triyono Wibowo	2012		Susilo Bambang Yudhoyono	
15	Hasan Kleib	2017	November 2020	Joko Widodo	
16	Febrian Alphyanto Ruddyard	25 October 2021 (Credential: 22 December 2021)	Incumbent	Joko Widodo	

== See also ==
- List of Indonesian ambassadors
- List of diplomatic missions of Indonesia
- Indonesia and the United Nations
