= Marlyn Maisarah =

Indonesian politician (born 1980)

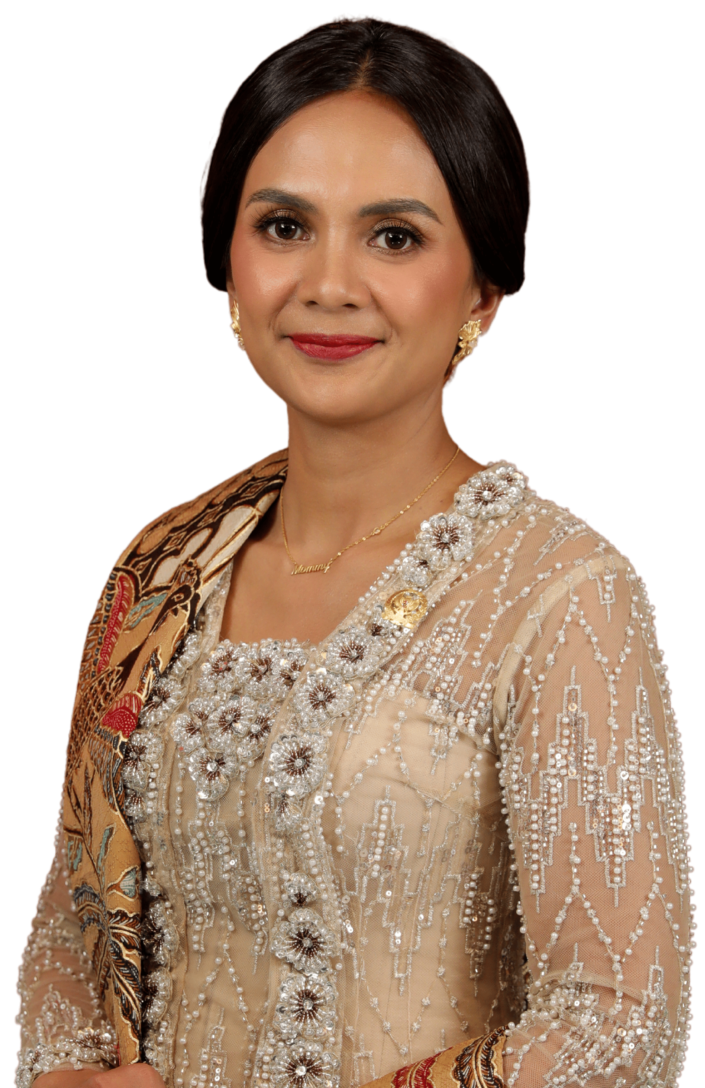
- Marlyn Maisarah in 2024

Member of the House of Representatives
- Incumbent
- Assumed office 1 October 2024
- Constituency: West Java V

Personal details
- Born: 18 May 1980 (age 45) Depok, West Java
- Party: Gerindra
- Spouse: Sugiono

Marlyn Maisarah (born 18 May 1980) is an Indonesian politician serving as a member of the House of Representatives since 2024. She is married to Sugiono.
