= Dindin Wahyudin =

Indonesian diplomat (born 1966)

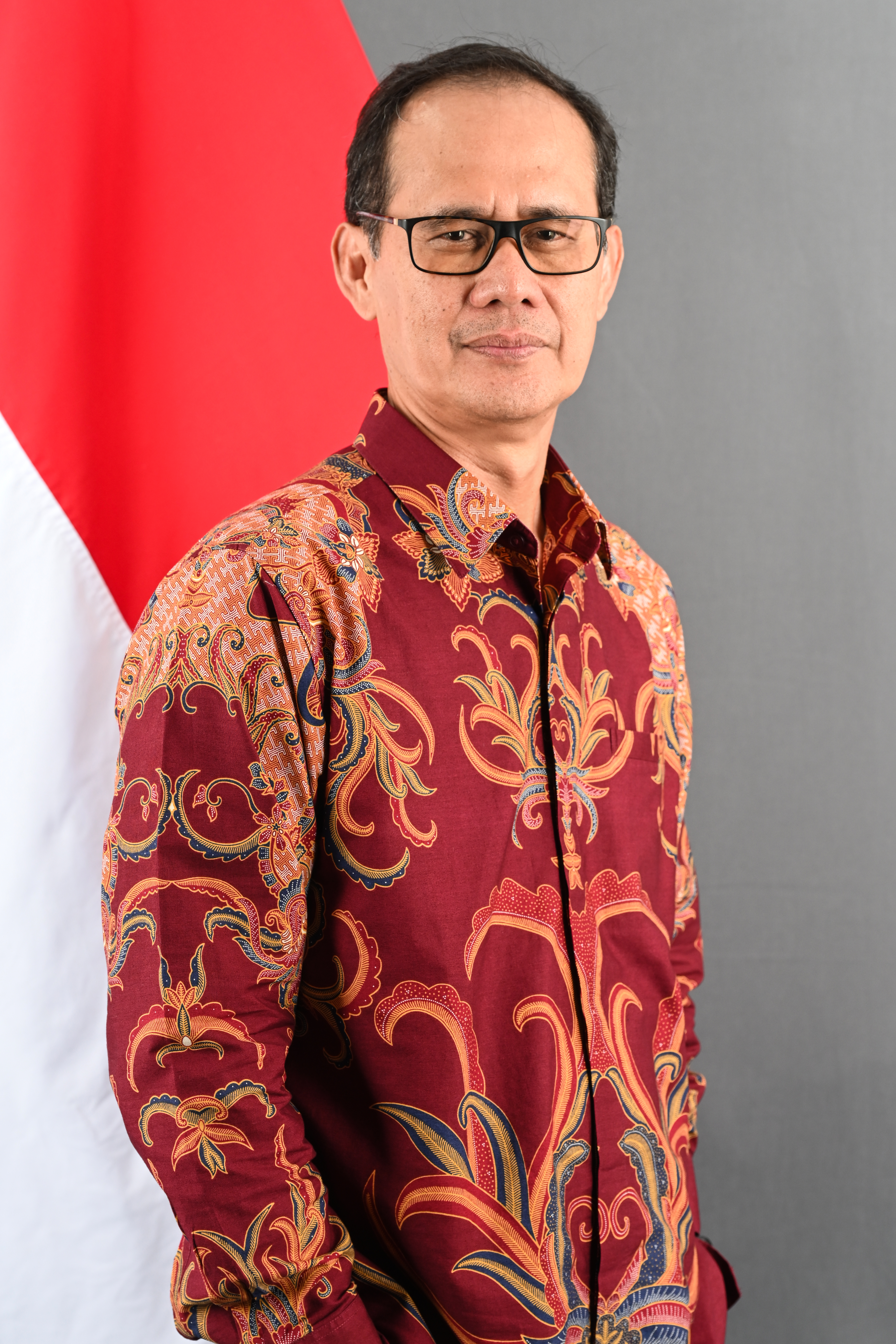

Inspector General of the Ministry of Foreign Affairs
- In office 17 September 2025 – 1 October 2026
- Preceded by: Ibnu Wahyutomo; Laurentius Amrih Jinangkung (acting)
- Succeeded by: Acep Somantri (acting)

Director General of International Law and Treaties
- Acting
- In office 15 January 2026 – 9 April 2026
- Preceded by: Laurentius Amrih Jinangkung
- Succeeded by: Ricky Suhendar

Ambassador of Indonesia to Senegal, Mali, Gambia, Guinea, Guinea Bissau, Sierra Leone, Cabo Verde, and Ivory Coast
- In office 26 October 2020 – 28 November 2023
- Preceded by: Mansyur Pangeran
- Succeeded by: Ardian Wicaksono

Personal details
- Born: 3 September 1966 (age 60) Bandung, West Java, Indonesia
- Education: Padjadjaran University (Drs.); Jean Moulin University Lyon 3 (DEA)

Dindin Wahyudin (born 3 September 1966) is an Indonesian diplomat currently serving as the inspector general of the foreign ministry since 2025. Previously, he served as ambassador to Senegal, with concurrent accreditation to Cape Verde, Guinea, Guinea-Bissau, Mali, Sierra Leone, Ivory Coast and Gambia, from 2020 to 2023, and as the foreign minister's advisor for economic diplomacy from 2023 to 2025.

== Early life and education ==
Dindin was born on 3 September 1966 in Bandung. He studied international relations at the Padjadjaran University since 1985, earning a bachelor's degree 1991. He continued his studies at Jean Moulin University Lyon 3, where he obtained his master's degree in international relations from 1996 to 1998.

== Career ==
Dindin's diplomatic career began as chief of the foreign department's South Asia section from 1994 to 1999. Following this, he was appointed to the protocol and consular section at the embassy in Islamabad from 2000 to 2003. During the 2003 arrests of six Indonesian university students in Karachi, Dindin led the Indonesia–Pakistan negotiation team based in Islamabad, where he bridged Indonesian and Pakistani authorities to ensure that the students' rights were protected and that diplomatic channels remained open. Although the students were allegedly arrested due to terrorism-related charges, Dindin later clarified that local officials in Pakistan only cited visa overstays and that the accusations of terrorism against the students were media-driven.

He returned to Jakarta to serve as the chief of the ASEAN Regional Forum (ARF) section at the foreign department from 2003 to 2005. He was then assigned to the embassy in France with the rank of counsellor, serving as the deputy permanent delegate to UNESCO under permanent delegates Aman Wirakartakusumah and Tresna Dermawan Kunaefi. He played a crucial role in the preparation of proposal documents, inter-agency coordination, and outreach to domestic stakeholders, including journalists. He also engaged with member countries of the UNESCO Intangible Cultural Heritage (ICH) and the UNESCO Secretariat. He was then sent to Abu Dhabi as Indonesia's delegate at the UNESCO ICH committee meeting from September to October 2009.

He then served as deputy director (chief of subdirectorate) for socio-cultural affairs and foreign NGOs from January 2010 to May 2013. During his tenure, he implemented the government's restriction on foreign NGOs through the clearing house permit from the foreign ministry and related instances. He also oversaw the government plans to prohibit foreign NGOs from collecting donations. He was then appointed to the political affairs section of the embassy in London with the rank of minister counsellor from May 2013 to January 2017. During his tenure, Dindin was involved in International Maritime Organization sessions, either accompanying the transport's minister special envoy for IMO Marsetio or leading the Indonesian delegate. Upon serving in London, Dindin was assigned to the foreign ministry's center for multilateral policy research and development as its chief for political and security section. Several months later, on 4 April 2018 he became the center's head. During his tenure, in 2019 he conducted a visit to Guam and Hawaii to understand how the islands balance military presence with tourism and economic development. Dindin's team concluded that Guam’s approach was deemed suitable for Natuna’s development strategy and reported it to the defense ministry.

On 19 March 2020, Dindin was nominated by President Joko Widodo as ambassador to Senegal, with concurrent accreditation to Cape Verde, Guinea, Guinea-Bissau, Mali, Sierra Leone, Ivory Coast and Gambia. During the assessment by the House of Representative's first commission in June, Dindin highlighted his four focus sectors as ambassadors, which were in politics and security, economy, information and social culture, and the protection of Indonesian citizens. Dindin emphasized strengthening African support for Indonesia's territorial integrity, particularly against separatist movements in West Papua, and aimed to increase market access for its health sector, commodities, and defense industries. Didin also pushed for Indonesia's positive image through its contributions to peacekeeping and its status as a peaceful, majority-Muslim democracy. Upon passing the assessment, he was installed on 26 October 2020.

Dindin presented his credentials to the President of Senegal Macky Sall on 4 March 2021, President of Cape Verde Jorge Carlos Fonseca on 18 March 2021, President of Guinea-Bissau Umaro Sissoco Embaló on 27 April 2021, President of Sierra Leone Julius Maada Bio on 16 July 2021, President of Ivory Coast Alassane Ouattara on 29 November 2021, President of Guinea Mamady Doumbouya on 30 September 2022, President of Mali Assimi Goïta on 22 November 2022, and to the foreign minister of Gambia Mamadou Tangara on 17 September 2023. After being installed as the foreign minister's advisor for economic diplomacy on 12 September 2023, he handed over his post to chargé d'affaires ad interim Aris Triyono on 28 November 2023.

Dindin was installed as the foreign ministry's inspector general on 17 September 2025. On 15 January 2026, Dindin assumed additional duties as the acting director general of international law and treaties in light of Laurentius Amrih Jinangkung's departure as ambassador to the Netherlands.

On 10 August 2026, Dindin was nominated by President Prabowo Subianto as ambassador to New Zealand. He underwent a parliamentary vetting process by the House of Representative's first commission on 23 September 2026. Dindin retired from his duties as inspector general on 1 October 2026, and he was replaced by Acep Somantri as acting inspector general.
