= Ardian Wicaksono =

Indonesian diplomat (born 1969)

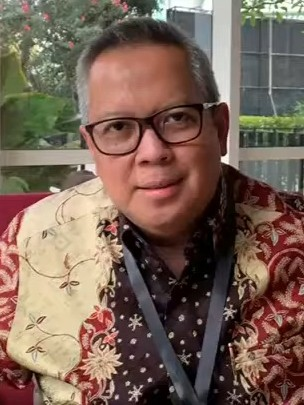

Ambassador of Indonesia to Senegal, Mali, Gambia, Guinea, Guinea Bissau, Sierra Leone, Cabo Verde, and Côte d'Ivoire
- Incumbent
- Assumed office 24 March 2025
- Preceded by: Dindin Wahyudin

Personal details
- Born: 1 July 1969 (age 56) Jakarta, Indonesia
- Spouse: Hilyah Achdar (m. 1996)
- Education: University of Indonesia (Drs., M.Si.)

Ardian Wicaksono (born 1 July 1969) is an Indonesian diplomat who is serving as the Indonesian ambassador to Senegal, with concurrent accreditation to Mali, Gambia, Guinea, Guinea Bissau, Sierra Leone, Cabo Verde, and Côte d'Ivoire, since 24 March 2025.

== Early life and education ==
Born on 1 July 1969 in Jakarta, Ardian completed his primary education at the Pangudi Luhur High School in 1988. He then studied international relations at the University of Indonesia and graduated in 1994. He pursued a master's degree in American studies at the same university and graduated in 2006 with a thesis on George Bush's war on terror.

== Career ==
Wicaksono began his diplomatic career in March 1995. He was posted at the Indonesian consulate general in New York as a junior consul, recognized on 12 August 1999. Upon receiving his master's degree, he was assigned at the embassy in Helsinki, where he served as first secretary for economic affairs and coordinator for information and social-cultural affairs between November 2005 to December 2009. He was involved in promoting Indonesia through fairs and, during the 2009 general election, was entrusted as a member of the foreign election committee in Helsinki.

Following this, he returned to the foreign ministry as deputy director (chief of subdirectorate) from December 2009 to May 2013. His international postings continued with a tenure as counselor for political affairs at the Embassy of Indonesia, Washington, D.C. from May 2013 to January 2017. On 27 April 2017, Ardian was appointed as the director of the 3rd European region, with responsibilities on the Eastern Europe, Balkans, and Caucasus countries.

In June 2020, Ardian was installed as the consul-general of Indonesia in Hamburg. He arrived in Hamburg later that month and introduced himself to the Indonesian community there through videoconference due to the ongoing COVID-19 pandemic. He handed his accreditation letter as a consul general on 6 July 2020. In September 2020, Ardian visited the Tierpark Hagenbeck zoo and adopted Batu, a Sumatran orangutan who was born five weeks before Ardian began his term. He brought tropical gifts for Batu and the other orangutans, including coconuts, jackfruit, and culturally adorned cloths.

In August 2024, President Joko Widodo nominated Ardian as Indonesia's ambassador to Senegal, with concurrent accreditation to Mali, Gambia, Guinea, Guinea Bissau, Sierra Leone, Cabo Verde, and Côte d'Ivoire. He passed a fit and proper test held by the House of Representatives' first commission in September that year. He was installed by President Prabowo Subianto on 24 March 2025. He arrived in Dakar on 29 June and assumed duties from chargé d'affaires Aris Triyono two days later. He presented his credentials to the President of Guinea Mamady Doumbouya on 10 October 2025, President of Senegal Bassirou Diomaye Faye on 14 October 2025, to the President of Guinea-Bissau Umaro Sissoco Embaló on 22 October 2025, and to the President of Mali Assimi Goïta on 30 October 2025.

== Personal life ==
Ardian has been married to Hilyah Achdar since 1996. They have one son, Muhammad Rafie, who was born in 2006 during Ardian's posting in Helsinki, Finland.
