= Ricky Suhendar =

Indonesian diplomat (born 1970)

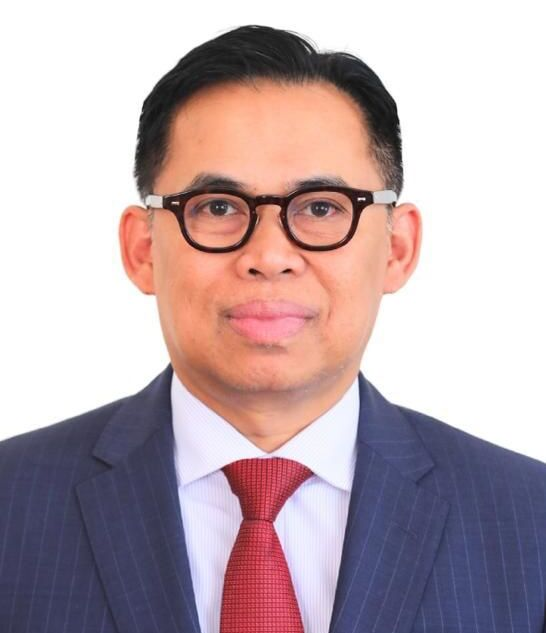

Director General of International Law and Treaties
- Incumbent
- Assumed office 9 April 2026
- Minister: Sugiono
- Preceded by: Laurentius Amrih Jinangkung; Dindin Wahyudin (acting)

Ambassador of Indonesia to Peru and Bolivia
- In office 26 June 2023 – 2 June 2026
- President: Joko Widodo; Prabowo Subianto
- Preceded by: Marina Estella Anwar Bey
- Succeeded by: Ichsan Firdaus (CDA)

Personal details
- Born: 9 November 1970 (age 55)
- Education: Parahyangan Catholic University (Drs.)

Ricky Suhendar (born 9 November 1970) is an Indonesian diplomat who is currently serving as director general of international law and treaties since 2026. Previously, he served as consul general in Hongkong from 2019 to 2023 and ambassador to Peru and Bolivia from 2023 to 2026.

== Early life and education ==
Born on 9 November 1970, Ricky studied law at the Parahyangan Catholic University from 1989, graduating with a bachelor's degree.

== Diplomatic career ==
Ricky began his diplomatic service in 1995 and was posted to the permanent mission to the United Nations in New York from 1997 to 2000. During this period, he served as Indonesia's legal adviser to the United Nations General Assembly Sixth Committee. He was involved in negotiations relating to United Nations Commission on International Trade Law and the International Court of Justice. From 1999 to 2003, he was posted at the political section of the embassy in Brasilia with the rank of third secretary.

From 2006 to 2009, Ricky served as vice consul for sociocultural and information affairs at the consulate in Perth. On one occasion, Ricky handled the repatriation of Indonesian "boat people" who attempted to flee from Indonesia and personally flew with them to Jakarta. He also handled cases of human trafficking of Indonesian citizens. After serving in Perth, from 2010 to 2013 he was appointed as deputy director (chief of subdirectorate) for legal services in the foreign ministry. He was then assigned to the protocol and consular section of the embassy in Tokyo, Japan with the diplomatic rank of counsellor. He was later transferred to head the information section and, by 2015, he was promoted to the diplomatic rank of minister counsellor and served as coordinator for social, cultural, and information affairs in the embassy.

On 26 April 2017, Ricky was sworn in as director for political and security law and treaties in the foreign ministry. As director, Ricky was involved in the negotiations on the mutual legal assistance between Indonesia and Switzerland. He also became the chief delegate of Indonesia to the seventh Working Group on Model ASEAN Extradition Treaty in Singapore in 2018, during which he encouraged ASEAN members to agree on a Model ASEAN Extradition treaty and negotiate on a binding legal instrument.

After serving in the foreign ministry, Ricky was installed as consul general in Hong Kong in 2019. He arrived in Hong Kong on 18 September 2019. During the COVID-19 pandemic in Hong Kong, Ricky maintained active communication with employment agencies and employers to ensure the health and welfare of Indonesian domestic helpers as well as supporting efforst by the manpower ministry to vaccinate Indonesian migrant workers in Hong Kong as well as those who are about to depart. He also urged Indonesian migrant workers to adhere to public health guidelines. The consulate general under Ricky also fostered Indonesian economic promotions through webinars and agreements, such as on credit lendings and digital services. In January 2021 the consulate general launched e-passport service to streamline immigration services. The next month, Ricky and his Philippines counterpart Raly L. Tejada submitted a joint demarche to the Hong Kong ombusdman regarding the living conditions of boarding facilities and enforce health and safety standards for domestic helpers.

In December 2022, Ricky was nominated as ambassador to Peru, with concurrent accreditation to Bolivia, by President Joko Widodo. After passing an assessment by the house of representative's first commission the next month, he officially assumed office on 26 June 2023. He received his ambassadorial duties from charge d'affaires ad interim Rangga Yudha Nagara on 24 August 2023. He presented his credentials to the President of Peru Dina Boluarte on 24 October 2023 and the President of Bolivia Luis Arce on 11 December 2023. Following the assassination of Zetro Leonardo Purba, a junior chancery officer at the embassy on 1 September 2025, Ricky was instructed by foreign minister Sugiono to arrange the return of Zetro's remains and supervise the assassination investigation. Ricky handed over his ambassadorial duties to Ichsan Firdaus as chargé d'affaires ad interim on 2 June 2026.

On 9 April 2026, Ricky was installed as director general of international law and treaties.
