= Sugiono =

Indonesian politician and diplomat (born 1979)

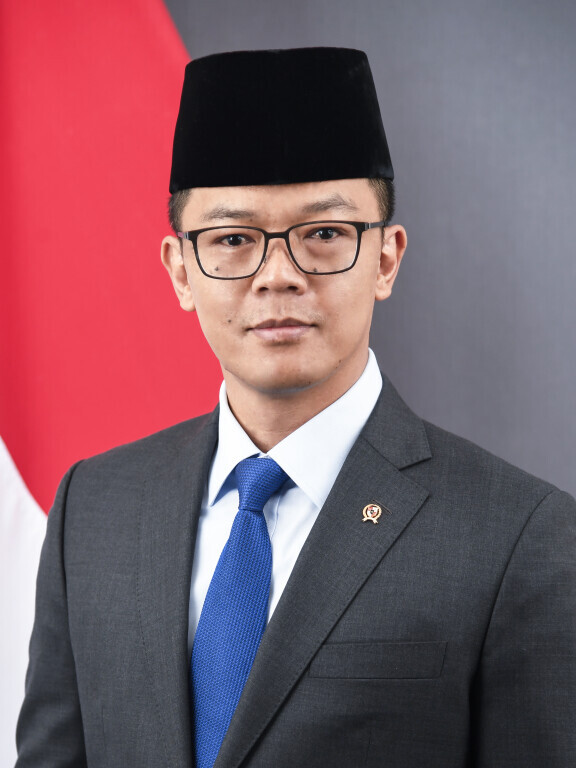
- Official portrait, 2024

16th Coordinating Minister for Human Development and Culture
- Incumbent
- Assumed office 1 October 2026
- President: Prabowo Subianto
- Preceded by: Pratikno

18th Minister of Foreign Affairs
- In office 21 October 2024 – 1 October 2026
- President: Prabowo Subianto
- Vice Minister: Anis Matta; Arrmanatha Christiawan Nasir; Arif Havas Oegroseno
- Preceded by: Retno Marsudi
- Succeeded by: Arrmanatha Nasir

2nd Secretary-General of Gerindra
- Incumbent
- Assumed office 1 August 2025
- Chairman: Prabowo Subianto
- Preceded by: Ahmad Muzani

Member of the House of Representatives
- In office 1 October 2019 – 21 October 2024
- Constituency: Central Java I
- Majority: 62,855 (2024)

Personal details
- Born: 11 February 1979 (age 47) Takengon, Aceh, Indonesia
- Party: Gerindra
- Spouse: Marlyn Maisarah
- Children: 1
- Education: Taruna Nusantara
- Alma mater: Norwich University (BS); University of Konstanz (MMgt, MBus)

Military service
- Allegiance: Indonesia
- Branch/service: Indonesian Army
- Years of service: 2002–2004
- Rank: First Lieutenant
- Unit: Infantry (Kopassus)

Sugiono (born 11 February 1979) is an Indonesian politician and diplomat who is serving as the Coordinating Minister for Human Development and Culture since 1 October 2026, succeeding Pratikno. A member of the Gerindra Party, he is also the party's secretary-general since 2025. He previously served as the Minister for Foreign Affairs in President Prabowo Subianto's Red and White Cabinet from 2024 to 2026, and as a member of the House of Representatives from 2019 to 2024, holding the role of deputy chairperson of the House's First Commission which oversees the fields of defense, foreign affairs, and communications.

Sugiono is dubbed as Prabowo's "ideological child". Upon his appointment as the Minister of Foreign Affairs, Sugiono has become the first non-diplomat and the first person with no academic background in international relations or diplomacy to hold that position in nearly 25 years. He is also the first foreign minister to be affiliated with a political party since Alwi Shihab. All of his three predecessors, Hassan Wirajuda, Marty Natalegawa, and Retno Marsudi were career diplomats and non-partisan before becoming the top diplomat in Indonesia.

== Early life and education ==
Sugiono was born on 11 February 1979, in Takengon, Aceh, Indonesia.

In 1994, he was selected to attend the prestigious Taruna Nusantara High School, where he met his classmate Agus Harimurti Yudhoyono, whom he even challenged for the position of chairman of their school's student council.

Upon graduation, he received scholarship to study at Norwich University in the United States, where he earned a BS degree in computer science. He later obtained a Master of Business and Master of Management from the University of Konstanz in Germany.

== Career ==
=== Early career ===
After completing his undergraduate education, Sugiono served in the Indonesian Army from 2002 to 2004, where he reached the rank of first lieutenant in the infantry unit. His brief military service laid the groundwork for his later roles in public service. He then worked as a personal secretary to Prabowo Subianto and when Prabowo declared the formation of Gerindra as a political party, Sugiono became one of the first members of the party, marking the start of his political career.

=== House of Representatives ===
Sugiono entered national politics in 2019 when he was elected to the House of Representatives representing the Central Java I constituency under the banner of the Gerindra Party. During his tenure, he played an active role in the First Commission, focusing on defense, foreign affairs, and communications. He served in this capacity until his appointment as a cabinet minister in October 2024.

=== Minister of Foreign Affairs ===
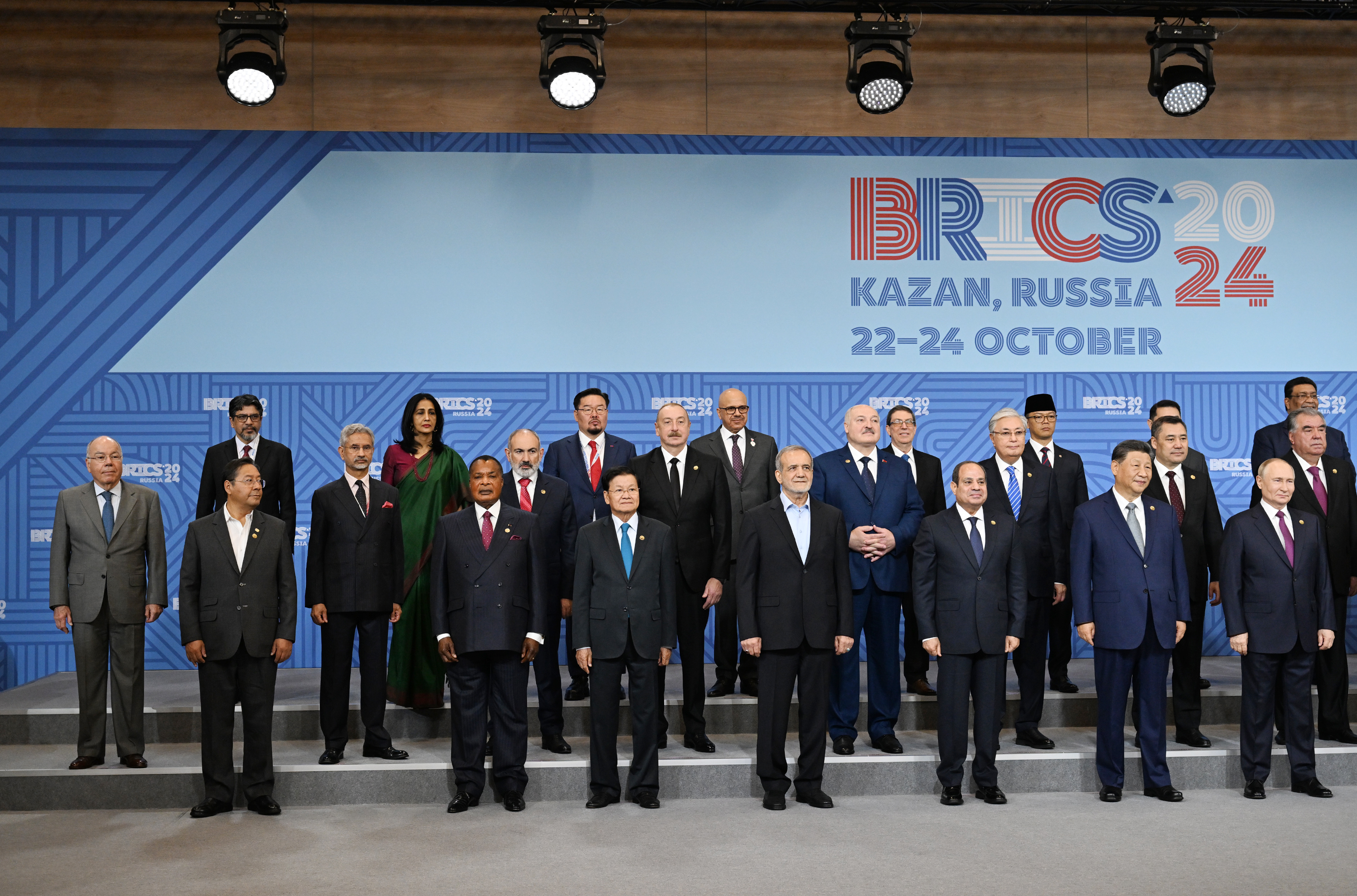
Sugiono with CCP General Secretary Xi Jinping and other participants at the 16th BRICS summit in Kazan, Russia, 24 October 2024

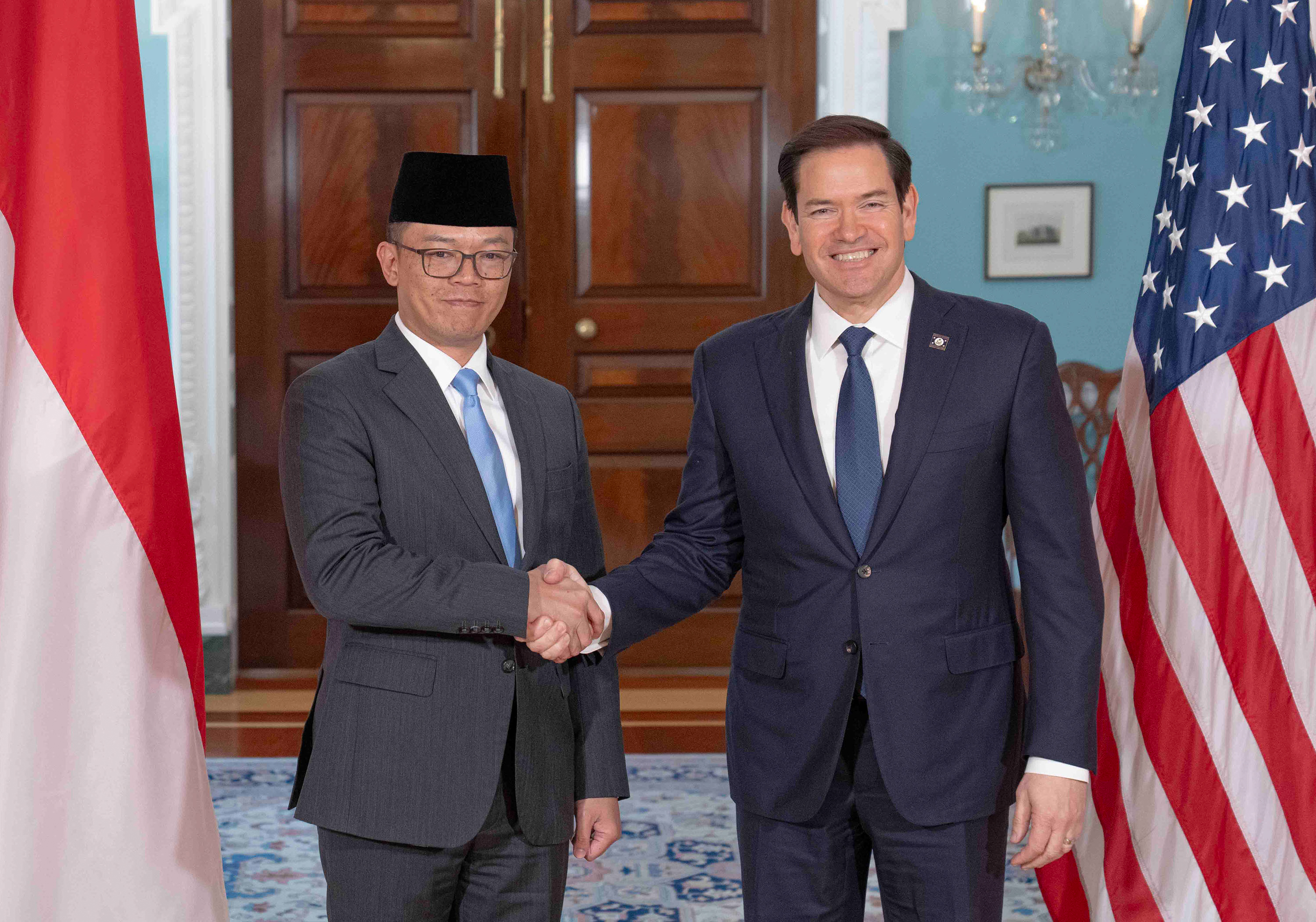
Sugiono with US Secretary of State Marco Rubio, 16 April 2025

On 20 October 2024, President Prabowo Subianto appointed Sugiono as the Minister of Foreign Affairs, succeeding Retno Marsudi. His deputies include Anis Matta, Arrmanatha Christiawan Nasir, and Arif Havas Oegroseno. In a press conference of his appointment, Sugiono said he will balance Indonesia's diplomatic relationship between China and United States to realize Indonesia's free and active foreign policy.

Sugiono’s appointment as foreign minister elicited a variety of responses. He faced criticism for being viewed as inexperienced in foreign policy. However, some welcomed his appointment, believing that a foreign minister without a diplomatic background could offer new solutions that previous officials may have overlooked. Sugiono's appointment indicates that Prabowo is more actively engaging with foreign policy than his predecessor, Joko Widodo.

Shortly after his appointment, Sugiono made his first official international visit to attend the 16th BRICS Summit in Kazan, Russia, as Indonesia’s representative.

Sugiono envisions Indonesia's BRICS membership as a strategic move to amplify its voice on the global stage. He believes that active participation in BRICS will drive economic development and foster stronger trade relations.

In his maiden foreign policy speech on 10 January 2025, Sugiono highlighted President Prabowo Subianto's policies, saying active participation in peace-keeping effort at the ASEAN and United Nations level will be one of the country's key moves. He said the country's foreign policy should be implemented in line with Indonesia's domestic development priorities, laying out two development priorities of the President – food security and the nationwide campaign of nutrition intervention through Free Nutritious Meals.

On 11 October 2025, Sugiono became the first Indonesian foreign minister in 12 years to visit North Korea, meeting with North Korean Foreign Minister Choe Son-hui to bolster Indonesia–North Korea relations.

== Political views ==
Sugiono is regarded by Gerindra members as Prabowo's "ideological" son due to their close working relationship, dating back to his role as personal secretary. Prabowo often discussed various topics with him, reinforcing this bond. Sugiono is considered one of the members of Prabowo's inner circle, and Gerindra members believe he may have adopted similar political stances to those of Prabowo.

To foster a robust and dynamic ASEAN region, Indonesia expressed full support for ASEAN Community Vision 2045, to be adopted at the Malaysia’s ASEAN chairmanship in 2025. Speaking at ASEAN’s Foreign Minister’s (AMM) retreat in Langkawi, Malaysia, Foreign Minister Sugiono stressed that the time to tackle regional challenges in isolation is over. He advocated strengthening ASEAN mechanisms, like ASEAN Regional Forum, the East Asia Forum and the ASEAN institute for Peace and Reconciliation.

Speaking at the ASEAN’s Foreign Minister’s (AMM) retreat in Langkawi, Sugiono said Indonesia welcomed the ceasefire agreement between Israel and Hamas. He said that for the Palestinians to reconstruct their lives, its crucial for the ceasefire deal to be executed quickly and comprehensively. Sugiono said: “We must continue to call for the resumption of the peace process towards a two-state solution, based on internationally agreed parameters”

== Personal life ==
Sugiono is married to Marlyn Maisarah, and they have one child. His wife currently serves as a member of House of Representatives in which she was elected as a representative for West Java V for the period 2024 to 2029.

Sugiono is known to be able to speak French. During a parliamentary hearing involving Prabowo Subianto prior to his inauguration as president, First Commission Chair Meutya Hafid requested that Sugiono, who was vice chair of the commission, read out the title of the Franco-Indonesian Defence Cooperation Draft Act, which was presented in French as well as Indonesian. Sugiono pronounced it flawlessly, prompting applause from all those in attendance. Hafid later jokingly asked Prabowo whether he thought Sugiono was "suited" to be his foreign minister.

== Honours ==
- Indonesia:
  - Star of Mahaputera, 3rd Class (25 August 2025)
