= Acep Somantri =

Indonesian diplomat (born 1967)

Inspector General of the Ministry of Foreign Affairs
- Acting
- Assumed office 1 October 2026
- Preceded by: Dindin Wahyudin

Personal details
- Born: December 10, 1967 (age 58)
- Spouse: Lilies Ekawaty
- Education: Padjadjaran University (S.IP.)

Acep Somantri (born 10 December 1967) is an Indonesian career diplomat who is currently serving as the advisor to the foreign minister for management affairs since 2023, and most recently was accorded additional duties as the acting inspector general of the foreign ministry since October 2026. He was previously the health ministry's head of foreign cooperation bureau and consul general in Frankfurt.

== Life and career ==
Acep Somantri during his posting in Washington D.C.

Born on 10 December 1967, Acep received his bachelor's degree in international relations from the Padjadjaran University. He joined the foreign ministry in March 1995. Between 2000 and 2002, Acep was posted to the embassy in Washington, D.C. as the third secretary for political affairs. His next overseas assignment was at the permanent mission in Geneva as the first secretary for political affairs, where on 19 January he received the Ksatria Bakti Husada Arutala award from the health minister for his role challenging the unfair virus sharing system under WHO's Global Influenza Surveillance Network (GISN), which was considered unequitable for developing nations such as Indonesia.

In November 2016, Acep was appointed as the health ministry's head of foreign cooperation bureau. During the first few months, MoUs signed by the ministry rose by forty percent, and by the end of his term in 2020 the ministry had signed 22 MoUs with partner countries in comparison to the 3 MoUs in 2016. Acep's leadership also saw Indonesia's leadership in several ASEAN health cooperation projects, as well as becoming the host and chairman of several strategic health-related multilateral forums. Acep's final months coincided with the COVID-19 pandemic in Indonesia, where he played a role in securing logistical and technical support in handling the pandemic through agreements with 14 different partner countries. On 30 June 2020, Acep received a citation from health minister Terawan Agus Putranto for his "achievement and dedication" towards the health ministry throughout his tenure. He was replaced in early July 2020 by Pretty Multihartina.

Acep was appointed to replace Toferry Primanda Soetikno as consul general in Frankfurt, who relinquished his office on 31 July 2020. Acep arrived in Frankfurt on 6 August 2020 and officially began his duties the next day through a handover ceremony. Acep's jurisdiction covers, among others, the North Rhine-Westphalia state, which accounts for one-fourth of Indonesia's export to Germany. Acep's role in Germany focused on economic diplomacy through routine business forums and participation in exhibitions, as well as cultural diplomacy by introducing Indonesian language to the local populace through BIPA (Indonesian as a Foreign Language, Bahasa Indonesia untuk Penutur Asing) classes. Acep's term in Frankfurt ended on 31 July 2023.

On 12 September 2023, Acep was inducted as the foreign minister's senior advisor for management affairs. Outside the foreign ministry, Acep is the secretary general of the Association of Indonesian Diplomats, chosen in December 2023, and member of the central board (andalan nasional) of the Pramuka Movement of Indonesia for foreign cooperation. On 1 October 2026, Acep was appointed as the foreign ministry's acting inspector general, after the previous officeholder Dindin Wahyudin stepped down in light of his retirement.

Acep is married to Lilies Ekawaty.
