= Cabinet of Joko Widodo =

Cabinet of Joko Widodo may refer to:

- Working Cabinet (2014–2019)
- Onward Indonesia Cabinet
