= Laurentius Amrih Jinangkung =

Indonesian diplomat (born 1967)

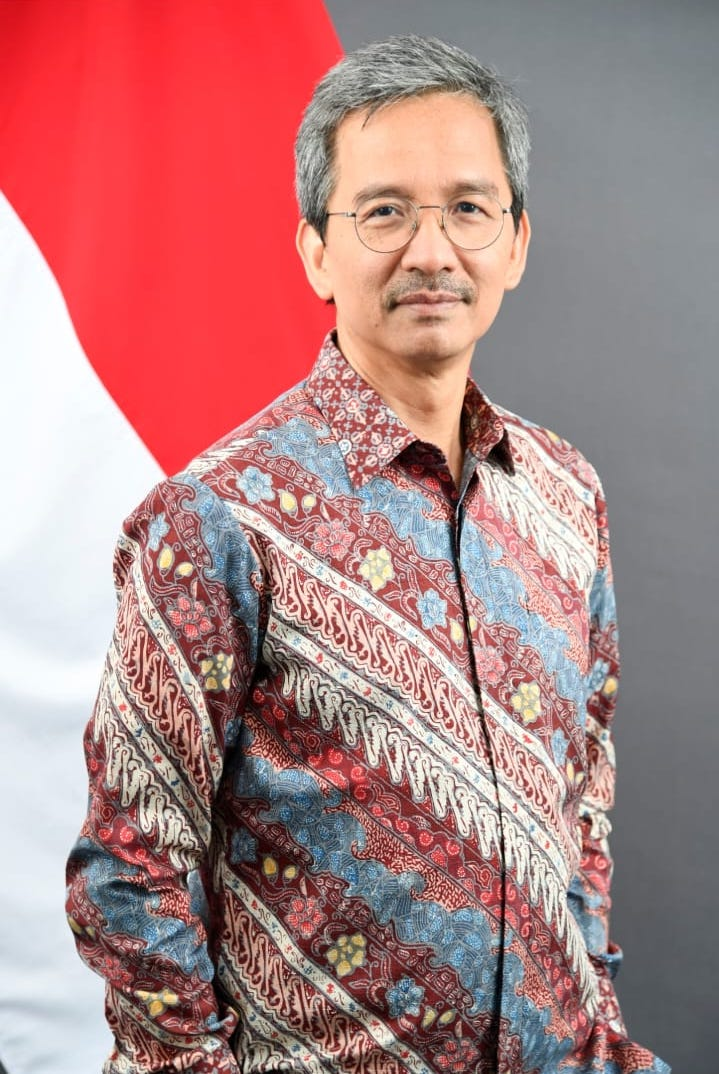

Ambassador of Indonesia to the Netherlands
- Incumbent
- Assumed office 8 October 2025
- President: Prabowo Subianto
- Preceded by: Mayerfas

Director General of International Law and Treaties
- In office 27 April 2022 – 15 January 2026
- Preceded by: Damos Dumoli Agusman
- Succeeded by: Dindin Wahyudin (acting); Ricky Suhendar

Inspector General of the Ministry of Foreign Affairs
- Acting
- In office 13 June 2025 – 17 September 2025
- Preceded by: Ibnu Wahyutomo
- Succeeded by: Dindin Wahyudin

Ambassador of Indonesia to the Holy See
- In office 14 September 2020 – 30 June 2022
- President: Joko Widodo
- Preceded by: Antonius Agus Sriyono
- Succeeded by: Michael Trias Kuncahyono

Personal details
- Born: June 18, 1967 (age 59) Nanggulan, Kulon Progo, Yogyakarta, Indonesia
- Spouse: Bertha Lusiana
- Children: 2
- Education: Gadjah Mada University (S.H.); Cornell Law School (LL.M.)

Laurentius Amrih Jinangkung (born 18 June 1967) is an Indonesian diplomat who became the ambassador to the Netherlands in 2025. A law graduate of the Gadjah Mada University, Jinangkung was posted as ambassador to the Holy See and director general of international law and treaties before that.

== Early life and education ==
Born on 18 June 1967 in Nanggulan, Kulon Progo, Yogyakarta, Laurentius Amrih Jinangkung is the seventh of nine children born to Paulus K. Kasmodihardjo, an elementary school teacher, and Climentina Sutinem, a village nurse.

Jinangkung completed his elementary and middle school education in Nanggulan before continuing to high school at Kolese de Britto in Yogyakarta. He then studied law at the Gadjah Mada University (UGM) in Yogyakarta in 1986, graduating in 1992. Although he initially aspired to be a military officer, he changed his mind at the end of his studies at UGM and chose to pursue a career in the foreign department. He later continued his formal education abroad, earning a master's degree in law (LL.M) from Cornell Law School in Ithaca, New York, between 1997 and 1998. He also completed courses at the Economic Institute at Colorado University in 1997 and a Maritime Boundary Delimitation Course at IBRU-Durham University in England in 2004.

== Career ==
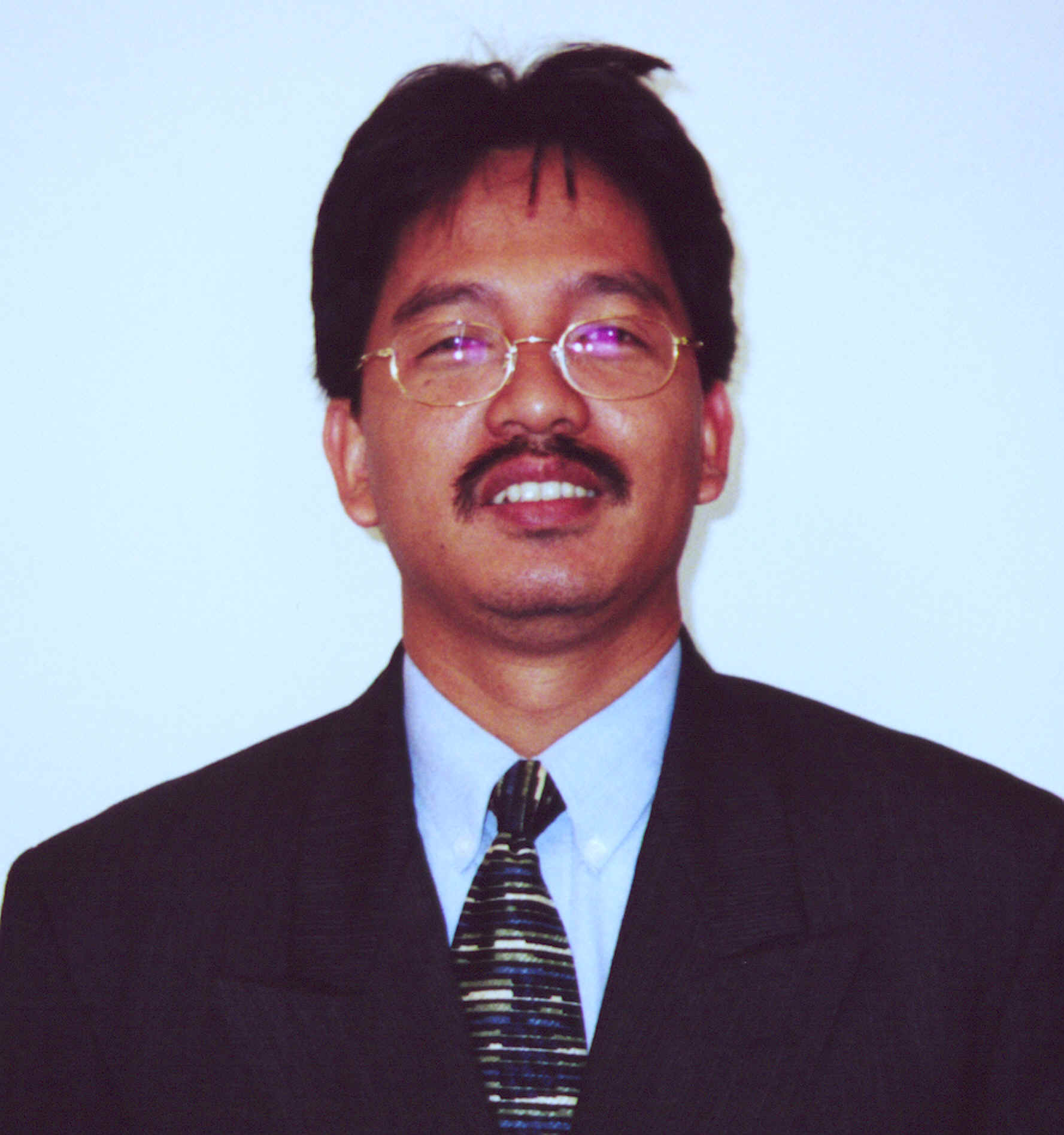
Jinangkung during his service at the embassy in Washington D.C.

Jinangkung's entered the foreign ministry in 1993, beginning his career upon completing basic diplomatic education in 1994. Over the years, he was assigned to several of Indonesia's overseas missions in Vienna, The Hague, and Washington, D.C. From 2000 to 2003, he served at the embassy in Washington with the rank of second secretary. He then returned to Indonesia to serve as the chief of maritime boundaries section until 2006, where he provided legal advice to the department in negotiating maritime boundaries with the neighboring countries. During this time, he attended the mid-level diplomatic course in 2005. From there, he was posted to the political section of the embassy in The Hague with the rank of counselor until 2010. He was subsequently recalled to Indonesia to serve as deputy director (chief of subdirectorate) for economic treaties. At the same time, in 2011 he attended the senior diplomatic education. On 21 November 2016, he was appointed as the director of economic, social, and cultural treaties in the foreign ministry. He did not held the office for long, as on 3 January 2017 he was installed as the director of economic law and treaties.

In May 2020, Jinangkung was nominated by President Joko Widodo as ambassador to the Holy See. After undergoing an assessment by the House of Representative's first commission on 17 June 2020, he was installed on 14 September. He presented his credentials to Pope Francis on 7 December 2020.

At the start of his tenure, he was responsible for the preparation for a planned pastoral visit of Pope Francis to Indonesia, which was ultimately postponed due to the COVID-19 pandemic. Jinangkung stated that he has found great joy in connecting with the large Indonesian community of priests, nuns, and seminarians, and he would offer them moral support and encouragement to study well and return to Indonesia to continue their missions. Jinangkung also promoted positive narratives about Indonesia to the international community in the Vatican, and initiated collaboration between Indonesian Catholic journalists and the Vatican Press Office to increase coverage of Indonesian news.

On 27 April 2022, Jinangkung was installed as the director general of international law and treaties in the foreign ministry. He officially left his ambassadorial post on 2 July. As director general, Jinangkung acted both as diplomats and legal advisors, ensuring treaties support foreign policy and legal standards. Regarding the delimitation of the Exclusive Economic Zone (ZEE) in the North Natuna Sea, Jinangkung announced Indonesia's refusal to follow Vietnam's proposal, citing national interest losses, as Vietnam prefers a boundary aligned with the continental shelf, which could favor its territorial claims. He resigned from the office on 15 January 2026 and was replaced by Dindin Wahyudin in an acting capacity.

In August 2024, Jinangkung was nominated by President Joko Widodo as ambassador to Russia and Belarus. However, he was never summoned for a fit and proper test by the House of Representatives for the office. After Joko Widodo was replaced by Prabowo Subianto, Jinangkung was nominated as ambassador to the Netherlands. After passing an assessment by House of Representative's first commission on 5 July 2025, his nomination was approved three days later. He was installed as ambassador on 8 October 2025 and presented his credentials to King Willem-Alexander of the Netherlands on 25 February 2026 and Organisation for the Prohibition of Chemical Weapons director general Fernando Arias the day after.

== Personal life ==
Jinangkung is married to Bertha Lusiana. The couple has two children.
