= Nugroho Wisnumurti =

Indonesian diplomat (1940–2023)

11th Permanent Representative of Indonesia to the United Nations in Geneva
- In office 2000–2004
- President: Abdurrahman Wahid; Megawati Sukarnoputri
- Preceded by: Hassan Wirajuda
- Succeeded by: Makarim Wibisono

Director General of Political Affairs
- In office 1 May 1997 – 17 July 2000
- Preceded by: Izhar Ibrahim
- Succeeded by: Hassan Wirajuda

President of the United Nations Security Council Membership: 1995–1996
- In office 1 November 1996 – 30 November 1996
- Secretary-General: Boutros Boutros-Ghali
- Preceded by: Delmer Urbizio Panting and Gerardo Martínez Blanco
- Succeeded by: Francesco Paolo Fulci
- In office 1 August 1995 – 31 August 1995
- Secretary-General: Boutros Boutros-Ghali
- Preceded by: Delmer Urbizio Panting and Gerardo Martínez Blanco
- Succeeded by: Francesco Paolo Fulci and Susanna Agnelli

12th Permanent Representative of Indonesia to the United Nations
- In office 1992–1997
- President: Suharto
- Preceded by: Nana Sutresna
- Succeeded by: Makarim Wibisono

Personal details
- Born: 23 March 1940 Surakarta, Dutch East Indies
- Died: 8 June 2023 (aged 83) Jakarta, Indonesia
- Spouse: Nan Irama Wisnumurti
- Children: 1
- Education: University of Indonesia; Columbia University; National Resilience Institute
- Occupation: Diplomat

Nugroho Wisnumurti (23 March 1940 – 8 June 2023) was an Indonesian diplomat. He was Indonesia's permanent representative to the United Nations in Geneva from 2000 to 2004.

== Education ==
- National Resilience Institute (Lemhannas), Jakarta (1988)
- Columbia Law School, New York City (1973)
- University of Indonesia Faculty of Law (1965)

== Curriculum vitae ==
- Ambassador/Permanent Representative of the Republic of Indonesia to the United Nations (in New York City) (1992–97)
- Ambassador to Jamaica, the Bahamas, Guatemala and Nicaragua (1992–1997)
- Representative of Indonesia to the United Nations Security Council (1995–1996)
- President, United Nations Security Council (August 1995 and November 1996)
- Chairman, Coordinating Bureau of the Non-Aligned Movement (1992–1995)
- Member, UN Group of Experts on Defensive Security (1991–92)
- Member, Group of Experts of the Non-Aligned Movement South Centre on UN's Role in Promoting International Cooperation (1991–1992)
- Negotiator/Chief Negotiator for various agreements on maritime delimitation with neighboring countries (1977–1989)
- Deputy Head, Indonesia's Delegation to the Conference on Disarmament, Geneva (1982–1986)
- Member and Secretary, Indonesia's Delegation to the Third UN Conference on the Law of the Sea (1974–1982)
- Member, Indonesia's Delegation to the UN Seabed Committee (1971–1974)

== Personal life and death ==
Wisnumurti was married to Nan Irama Wisnumurti. They had one daughter.

Wisnumurti was a first cousin, once removed, of Prof. Mr. Soenario, S.H. (1902–1997), Indonesia's minister of foreign affairs from 1953 to 1955.

Wisnumurti died at his residence in Pondok Kelapa, North Jakarta, on 8 June 2023, at the age of 83. He was buried at his family plot in Kebon Sari, Balerejo, Madiun.
