= Indonesia–European Union relations =

- European Union: Indonesia

Diplomatic relations between European countries and Indonesia date back to 1949. Initially, European Union (EU)–Indonesia relations were facilitated as a member of the Association of Southeast Asian Nations (ASEAN) through ASEAN–EU relations. Since then Indonesia's relations with the EU have developed significantly. The relations include cooperation in the fields of politics and security, economic and trade cooperation, socio-cultural cooperation and others.

== History ==
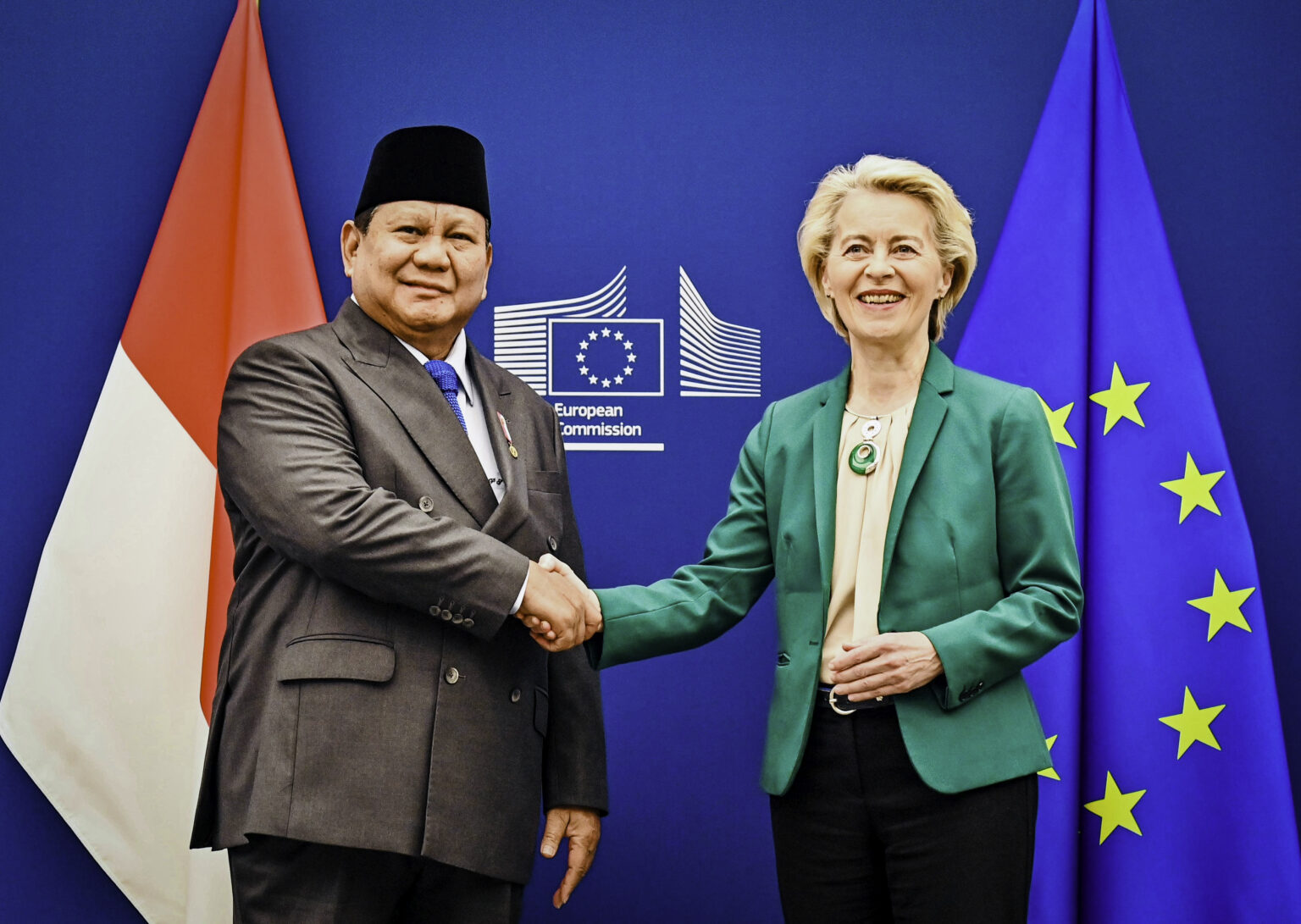
Indonesian President Prabowo Subianto with EU Commission President Ursula von der Leyen at the Berlaymont building.

Since the relationship between Indonesia and the European Union began, bilateral cooperation has continued to expand and finally the European Union Delegation to Indonesia was opened in 1988. The economic and political dialogue between Indonesia and the European Union takes the form of regular High Officials Meetings. In 2000, relations were further strengthened with the release of the European Commission communication "Developing Closer Relations between Indonesia and the EU". In November 2013, the European Union's high representative for foreign and security policy Catherine Ashton made her first official visit to Indonesia which was hailed as a long-awaited breakthrough in EU relations with Indonesia.

Indonesia was the first ASEAN country to sign a Comprehensive Partnership (Partnership and Cooperation Agreement) with the European Union in 2009. The agreement is the legal and political umbrella for bilateral relations between Indonesia and the European Union. The agreement came into effect in May 2014 and provides for extensive cooperation in the areas of security and political dialogue, trade, investment and economic cooperation as well as efforts to strengthen people-to-people ties through mobility, educational programs and cultural exchanges.

The relationship between Indonesia and the European Union reached a new point when President Joko Widodo visited Brussels on April 21, 2016. President Joko Widodo met with three Presidents of the three main institutions of the European Union, namely the President of the European Council, Donald Tusk, the President of the European Commission, Jean-Claude Juncker and the President of the European Parliament, Martin Schulz. The visit then became a milestone for future cooperation between Indonesia and the European Union with the production of a Joint Statement between the President of the Republic of Indonesia, the President of the European Council, the President of the European Commission containing a political commitment to start negotiations on the Indonesia–EU Comprehensive Economic Partnership Agreement (CEPA), a political commitment to implement FLEGT Licensing, encourage the elimination of palm oil barriers, Schengen visa exemptions, and the lifting of flight bans as well as cooperation in combating terrorism, promoting peace and tolerance, and education.

The first meeting of the Joint Committee (JC) under the Comprehensive Partnership (PCA) was then held in Brussels, Belgium on 28–29 November 2016. The meeting was opened by Federica Mogherini as the High Representative of the European Union for Foreign and Security Policy and Vice President of the European Commission, and by the Minister of Foreign Affairs of the Republic of Indonesia, Retno Marsudi. In this meeting, both parties discussed the implementation of new and old Working Groups and Dialogues, following up on security and human rights cooperation, exploring research and technology cooperation, and discussing cooperation on peatland management.

The European Commission and Indonesia concluded negotiations for the Indonesia–EU Comprehensive Economic Partnership Agreement in Bali on 23 September 2025. The CEPA was formally signed on 21 November 2026.

== Framework for EU-Indonesia cooperation ==
In 2009 the EU-Indonesia partnership and Cooperation Agreement (PCA) was signed. The PCA paved the way for closer cooperation in a wide range of fields and covers diverse areas of cooperation, such as trade, investment, human rights and climate change. The Agreement envisions four priority areas, namely education, human rights and democracy, trade and investment, and the environment.

== Economic relations ==
The EU and Indonesia have built robust commercial relations, with bilateral trade amounting to approximately €25 billion in 2012 resulting in a sizeable €5.7 billion trade surplus for Indonesia with the EU. In the past few years trade between EU and Indonesia has been marked by an upward trend. Whereas total trade was worth almost €16 billion in 2009, by 2011 it had already reached €23.5 billion. For the EU, Indonesia is the 24th largest import source (share 0.9%) and the 30th largest export destination (share 0.6%). Inside the ASEAN-region, Indonesia ranks fourth in terms of total trade. The EU is Indonesia's 4th largest trading partner after Japan, China and Singapore, representing almost 10% of its total external trade. The EU is the second largest investor in the Indonesian economy. Indonesia mostly exports to the EU agricultural products and processed resources, mainly palm oil, fuels and mining products, textiles and furniture. EU exports to Indonesia consist mainly of high-tech machinery and transport equipment, chemicals and various manufactured goods. Essentially, trade flows between Indonesia and the EU complement each other. After negotiations on a free trade agreement with ASEAN got increasingly difficult, the EU began pursuing negotiations with individual ASEAN states. The EU and Indonesia worked towards an ambitious Comprehensive Economic Partnership Agreement covering trade, investment and services.

The Indonesia Country Strategy Paper (CSP) outlined the overall development cooperation policies of the EU for 2007 to 2013. In line with this document, the EU collaborated closely with the Government of Indonesia to ensure that aid contributes to the national development strategy. Partnerships and projects were designed to support the Government of Indonesia's policies, laid out in the National Medium-Term Development Plan, which ran from 2009 to 2014. Against this backdrop, the EU focused its efforts on education, economic development, climate change, environment and good governance.

EU funding for projects in Indonesia takes a variety of forms including a large sector budget support allocation to the education sector.

=== Education ===
Strong emphasis is put on education representing almost 80% of the foreseen funding. This corresponds to the priority given by the Indonesian Government to education reforms.

The EU's bilateral assistance supports Indonesia's reform policies for basic education. It also provides budget support amounting to €180 million. In addition, the EU contributes €20 million to a technical cooperation facility which supports analytical work to develop governmental policies related to education and an additional 35 million to promote minimum service standards within education in a 110 districts considered to be lacking behind.

The EU also funds other projects that are in line with the national education strategy. These are implemented in close cooperation with local authorities and NGOs. These projects have different focal points ranging from vocational training, inclusive education to good teaching and learning practices.

The EU and its member states also support the higher education sector. Since 2004 the EU has provided Indonesian students with the opportunity to obtain scholarships through the Erasmus Mundus programme. The EU and its member states provide 1,250 scholarships annually for Indonesians to study at European universities.

=== Trade and investment ===
The Delegation lends its support to deepen Indonesia's integration into the international trade system. The objective is to help the country realise its full trade and investment potential. Through programs such as the EU-Indonesia Trade Support Programme (TSP II) and the EU-Indonesia Trade Cooperation Facility (TCF) the EU seeks to support government agencies in enhancing Indonesia's export infrastructure and creating favourable investment conditions.

Moreover, the EU assists Indonesia in reforming its public finance management and in bringing about sound fiscal conditions. This support specifically focuses on issues such as budget planning and execution, tax and customs administration, public procurement and auditing, as well as legislative budgetary oversight. On 21 November 2026, they anew trade agreement was signed promising lower tariffs and more investments.

=== Environment and climate change ===
Indonesia had committed to cut carbon emissions by 26% by 2020, a goal that had the full economic and political support of the EU and its member states.

Analogously, The EU has intensified climate change cooperation launching programmes that facilitate sustainable management of forests and natural resources. The EU assists Indonesia in addressing the most pressing environmental issues such as illegal logging through constructing Voluntary Partnership Agreements.

From 2010 to 2013, the EU and its member states supported Indonesia's climate change initiatives with US$1.5 billion (€1.17 billion) of which the EU has contributed almost half.

=== Good governance and human rights ===
A new EU-Indonesia Human Rights Dialogue was launched in 2009 to intensify exchanges on questions of mutual interest. The EU focuses on key areas of governance such as justice and security sector reform, law enforcement, and the support of human rights based community policing. Public institutions are supported in improving service delivery, particularly to the most vulnerable groups.

One important tool in this regard is the European Instrument for Democracy and Human Rights (EIDHR), whose aim it is to provide support for the promotion of democracy and human rights in non-EU countries. In Indonesia, projects under this program range from promoting freedom of religion and belief and supporting human rights defenders, to increasing human rights accountability and helping prevent torture. Oftentimes the focus lies on vulnerable segments of society such as children, women or minorities.

Within the field of good governance other focal areas are capacity building in the judicial sector as well as support to the anti-corruption commission.

=== Health, water and sanitation ===
The EU's health support focuses on disease control and improving regulations. In order to halt the transmission of HIV, tuberculosis and malaria, the EU and its member States contribute about 57% of the Global Fund to Fight Aids, Tuberculosis and Malaria (GFATM), and Indonesia has benefited from a commitment of €478 million from this fund since 2002. The EU teamed up with UNICEF to combat malnutrition and stunting among children. The improvement of sexual and reproductive health rights is also on the cooperation agenda.

=== Post-disaster reconstruction and disaster preparedness and conflict prevention ===
The EU supports Indonesia's efforts to prevent and manage human crises through programmes aimed at minimising the effects of natural disasters. The EU's approach to post-disaster reconstruction encompasses infrastructure development, housing reconstruction, strengthening governance structures, capacity building, and developing economic and environmental sustainability. The EU also supports activities that help Indonesia resolve and prevent internal conflicts. While the causes of conflict are addressed through a number of projects in various areas, non-military means are used to facilitate the peaceful resolution and prevention of existing conflicts. Such means include supporting good policing, the rule of law, civil administration, and civil protection emergency teams.

=== The EU in Aceh ===
In 2004 a tsunami ravaged the coast of Aceh. The EU provided substantial amounts of emergency aid. The EU has supported reconstruction programmes with over €200 million. Initially, €3 million were allocated for emergency measures, followed by a further €20 million earmarked for humanitarian assistance, which included temporary shelters, blankets, food, water and medical assistance. The EU also contributed to the Multi-Donor Trust Fund for Aceh and Nias (MDF). This fund was used to rebuild damaged infrastructure such as roads, irrigation channels, and sanitation units. In addition, the construction of homes, schools and government offices was financed. In addition, the EU has contributed to the Aceh peace process. The EU funded mediation talks and deployed the Aceh Monitoring Mission to oversee the implementation of the peace agreement and contributed nearly €30 million to help ensure the long-term stability of the peace process. In collaboration with national, international and local agencies, subsequent EU programmes focused on strengthening democratic institutions, building capacity in legal and policy making processes, and empowering civil society to participate in reform. Following almost 30 years of conflict and a devastating tsunami in 2004, today Aceh is considered back on track. The EU continues to work in the province, primarily in the area of climate change.

== Cooperation post 2013 ==
After the cycle from 2007 to 2013 expired, Indonesia graduated from development assistance, but continued to benefit from a number of thematic programmes as well as programmes related to the implementation of the partnership agreement.

== Indonesia's foreign relations with EU member states ==
- Austria
- Belgium
- Bulgaria
- Croatia
- Cyprus
- Czech Republic
- Denmark
- Estonia
- Finland
- France
- Germany
- Greece
- Hungary
- (Republic of Ireland) Ireland
- Italy
- Latvia
- Lithuania
- Luxembourg
- Malta
- Netherlands
- Poland
- Portugal
- Romania
- Slovakia
- Slovenia
- Spain
- Sweden

== See also ==
- Foreign relations of European Union
- Foreign relations of Indonesia
- ASEAN-EU relations
