= List of international presidential trips made by Prabowo Subianto =

This is a list of international presidential trips made by Prabowo Subianto, the 8th president of Indonesia. He has conducted 29 foreign trips to 29 countries during his presidency, which began on 20 October 2024.

== Summary ==
The number of visits per country where President Prabowo travelled are:

- One visit to Australia, Belarus, Belgium, Brunei, Canada, the Czech Republic, the Netherlands, Pakistan, Peru, Saudi Arabia, Switzerland, Thailand, and Turkey
- Two visits to Brazil, India, Japan, Jordan, the Philippines, Qatar, Singapore, and South Korea
- Three visits to China, Egypt, the United Kingdom, (Note: Prabowo also visited the UK in July 2025, but it was an informal visit.) and the United States
- Four visits to France, Russia, and the United Arab Emirates
- Five visits to Malaysia

Map of international trips made by Prabowo Subianto as president (as of November 2026): 1 visit 2 visits 3 visits 4 visits 5 visits Indonesia

== 2024 ==
#	Country	Areas visited	Dates	Details	Image
1	China	Beijing	8–10 November	Prabowo began his first overseas visit to China after his inauguration. Prabowo met Chinese president Xi Jinping, Premier Li Qiang, and Chairman of the Standing Committee of the National People's Congress Zhao Leji in Beijing. He also attend the Indonesia-China Business Forum in The Peninsula Hotel, Beijing.	
1	United States	Washington, D.C.	10–12 November	Prabowo held a bilateral meeting with US president Joe Biden at the White House. He also received a private meeting with CIA Director William J. Burns in Wisma Indonesia. On 11 November, Prabowo held a meeting with members of The United States – Indonesia Society corporation. In the meeting, he engaged directly with several major US companies' leaders that have long invested in Indonesia, including Freeport, Chevron, General Electric and other leading companies.	
1	Peru	Lima; Cusco	13–16 November	On 14 November, Prabowo held a breakfast meeting with Australian prime minister Anthony Albanese in Lima. Later, he paid an official visit to the Government Palace. He spoke with Peruvian president Dina Boluarte about enhancing ties between the two nations. The next day, Prabowo attended the APEC Peru 2024 in Cusco. He also held bilateral meetings with several heads of state/government such as Canadian prime minister Justin Trudeau, Vietnamese president Lương Cường, and New Zealand prime minister Christopher Luxon.	
1	Brazil	Rio de Janeiro	16–19 November	Prabowo attended the G20 Summit in Rio de Janeiro. On 17 November, accompanied by several ministers and Indonesian businessmen, he attended the Indonesia-Brazil Business Forum. He also held bilateral meetings with UN secretary general António Guterres, Tanzanian president Samia Suluhu Hassan, Indian prime minister Narendra Modi, French president Emmanuel Macron, and leaders of MIKTA.	
1	United Kingdom	London	20–22 November	Prabowo met King Charles III and held a bilateral meeting with British prime minister Keir Starmer and Deputy Prime Minister Angela Rayner. He also attended the CEO Roundtable Forum and succeeded in bringing an investment commitment of 8.5 billion US dollars.	
1	United Arab Emirates	Abu Dhabi	23 November	Prabowo held a bilateral meeting with Emirati president Sheikh Mohamed bin Zayed Al Nahyan at the Qasr Al Watan. The two leaders saw the signing of a variety of agreements and memorandums of understanding aimed at expanding bilateral cooperation in both the public and private sectors, as well as strengthening the Indonesia-UAE strategic partnership.	
2	Egypt	Cairo	17–19 December	Prabowo attended the 11th D-8 Summit. Previously, he held a bilateral meeting with Egyptian president Abdel Fattah el-Sisi at the Heliopolis Palace to discuss boosting collaboration in a variety of areas and peace in the Middle East. Prabowo gave a public lecture at Al-Azhar University in the face of Indonesian students. He would later hold a bilateral meeting with Pakistani prime minister Shehbaz Sharif.	

== 2025 ==
#	Country	Areas visited	Dates	Details	Image
3	Malaysia	Kuala Lumpur	9 January	Prabowo held a luncheon with Malaysian prime minister Anwar Ibrahim at Rumah Tangsi, a historical landmark in Kuala Lumpur. Prior to that, they attended an art exhibition showcasing Malaysian culture and history. The two leaders discussed bilateral relations and explore cooperation in new potential areas to strengthen Indonesian–Malaysian ties.	
4	India	New Delhi	23–26 January	Prabowo served as the chief guest for India's 76th Republic Day celebrations. He received an honorable visit by Union Minister of External Affairs S. Jaishankar at the hotel where he stayed overnight. Prabowo and Prime Minister Narendra Modi signed a number of agreements on collaboration in the areas of digital technology, maritime security, and health. Additionally, he went to a banquet invitation hosted by Indian president Droupadi Murmu at the Rashtrapati Bhavan.	
4	Malaysia	Kuala Lumpur	27 January	At the request of Yang di-Pertuan Agong Ibrahim Iskandar, Prabowo made a state visit to Kuala Lumpur to strengthen diplomatic relations and strategic collaboration between the two nations in a number of areas, which will advance both nations' interests. He was bestowed with the Most Esteemed Royal Family Order of Johor by Sultan Ibrahim. Prabowo also held another bilateral meeting with Prime Minister Anwar Ibrahim at the Petronas Towers. Additionally, he stated his support for Malaysia to serve as ASEAN's chairman in 2025.	
5	Malaysia	Putrajaya	6 April	Prabowo celebrated Eid al-Fitr with Prime Minister Anwar Ibrahim. The two leaders also discussed about US president Donald Trump's reciprocal tariff policy and its potential impact on several ASEAN member states, though they did not provide further details on the tariff discussion. They also touched on humanitarian cooperation, particularly both countries’ joint efforts to aid victims of the earthquake in Myanmar.	
6	United Arab Emirates	Abu Dhabi	9 April	Prabowo met President Sheikh Mohamed bin Zayed Al Nahyan at the Qasr Al Watan where they touched upon a range of critical international issues, including the United States's tariff policy and the Gaza war. The two leaders also announced eight bilateral agreements including cooperation in energy transition, food security, marine affairs, security and counterterrorism, trade and economy, as well as religious affairs.	
6	Turkey	Ankara; Antalya	9–11 April	Prabowo attended a military honor guard ceremony at Ankara Esenboğa Airport and was greeted directly by Turkish president Recep Tayyip Erdoğan. On the second day, he held tête-à-tête meeting with Erdoğan, a bilateral meeting with Turkish Grand National Assembly Speaker Numan Kurtulmuş, and delivered a speech before the Turkish Parliament. On 11 April, Prabowo attended the Antalya Diplomacy Forum in Antalya. During the ADF Talks session, he stressed that ensuring people's access to food, energy, and water will be a top priority for his administration.	
6	Egypt	Cairo	11–12 April	Prabowo arrived in Cairo following his participation in the ADF. On 12 April, he held a bilateral meeting with Egyptian president Abdel Fattah el-Sisi at the Heliopolis Palace, discussing ways to strengthen bilateral relations. The two presidents also signed a Joint Statement on Strategic Partnership between the two governments. Following the discussions, the two presidents visited the Egyptian Military Academy.	
6	Qatar	Doha	12–13 April	Following his visit to Egypt, Prabowo arrived in Doha. On 13 April, he held a meeting with Qatari Emir Sheikh Tamim bin Hamad Al Thani at the Amiri Diwan Palace. The two leaders witnessed the signing of a Memorandum of Understanding that initiated a Strategic Dialogue between the governments of the two nations.	
6	Jordan	Amman	13–14 April	On 13 April, Prabowo landed at the Amman Civil Airport and was welcomed directly by King Abdullah II of Jordan in a cordial procession. His plane was accompanied by Royal Jordanian Air Force F16 fighter jets upon entering Jordanian airspace. On 14 April, the two leaders held a bilateral meeting at the Al-Husseiniya Palace to discuss urgent regional issues and measures to strengthen collaboration. They also witnessed representatives signing Memorandums of Understanding that cover the fields of religion, education, agriculture, and defense.	
7	Brunei	Bandar Seri Begawan	14 May	Prabowo held a bilateral meeting with Sultan Hassanal Bolkiah at the Istana Nurul Iman discussing strategic areas of cooperation. He was given the honorary title of the Family Order of Laila Utama by Hassanal Bolkiah in recognition of his efforts to improve bilateral ties. The series of events culminated with a state luncheon hosted by Hassanal Bolkiah.	
8	Thailand	Bangkok	17–19 May	On 19 May, Prabowo held a meeting with King Vajiralongkorn and Queen Suthida at the Amphorn Royal Palace. he was then welcomed with a line-of-honor ceremony at Thai prime minister Paetongtarn Shinawatra's office in the Government House. The two leaders decided to strengthen bilateral collaboration in all areas of shared interest at the bilateral and regional levels and declared the elevation of ties to a strategic partnership. Prabowo was later invited by Shinawatra to a Thai cultural exhibit and a state banquet.	
9	Malaysia	Kuala Lumpur	25–27 May	Prabowo attended several important regional gatherings, including the 46th ASEAN Summit, the 2nd ASEAN-GCC Summit, the ASEAN-GCC-China Summit, and the 16th BIMP-EAGA Summit. He also held bilateral meetings with Laotian prime minister Sonexay Siphandone and Singaporean prime minister Lawrence Wong.	
10	Singapore		15–16 June	On 15 June, Prabowo arrived at the Paya Lebar Air Base and was welcomed directly by Prime Minister Lawrence Wong. His state visit began with a welcome ceremony at the Parliament House alongside Singaporean president Tharman Shanmugaratnam. The event was followed by a courtesy meeting between the two heads of state and their delegations. Prabowo also participated in a Leaders' Retreat alongside PM Wong, which resulted in 19 strategic agreements covering a wide range of areas of collaboration.	
10	Czech Republic	Prague	17–18 June	Prabowo made a transit in Prague en route to Russia by plane. He received a visit from Czech prime minister Petr Fiala. The two leaders reviewed Czech–Indonesian ties, looking for ways to develop mutually beneficial collaboration in investment and commerce.	
10	Russia	St. Petersburg	18–20 June	On 18 June, Prabowo landed at Pulkovo Airport and was welcomed with a military ceremony. The next day, he honored the victims of the Siege of Leningrad by laying a wreath at the Piskaryovskoye Memorial Cemetery. Later, Prabowo met with Russian president Vladimir Putin at the Constantine Palace to discuss measures to strengthen bilateral ties. A strategic partnership agreement was signed by the two leaders. Prabowo also attended the 2025 St. Petersburg International Economic Forum and he was the main speaker in front of delegations from various countries, alongside Putin.	
11	Saudi Arabia	Jeddah; Mecca	1–3 July	On 1 July, Prabowo arrived at the King Abdulaziz International Airport and was welcomed by a Saudi delegation in an honorary ceremony. The next day, he met Saudi Crown Prince Mohammed bin Salman at the Royal State Palace, where they talked about measures to improve bilateral connections between the two nations. The two leaders jointly led the first meeting of the Saudi-Indonesian Supreme Coordination Council and ratified the minutes. On 3 July, Prabowo performed the Umrah pilgrimage in Mecca.	
11	Brazil	Rio de Janeiro; Brasília	5–9 July	Prabowo attended the 17th BRICS summit at the Museum of Modern Art, where he participated in a plenary discussion about global peace, security, and artificial intelligence. During the summit, he introduced a soft power-based strategy, portraying his country as a bridge connecting the Global North and South. On 9 July, Prabowo met with Brazilian president Luiz Inácio Lula da Silva in a bilateral discussion in the Palácio do Planalto to talk about enhancing the two nations' strategic cooperation. Later, Prabowo attended a state luncheon hosted by Lula at the Itamaraty Palace.	
11	Belgium	Brussels	12–13 July	On 13 July, Prabowo met with European Commission President Ursula von der Leyen at the Berlaymont building. The two announced that the Indonesia-European Union Comprehensive Economic Partnership Agreement (IEU-CEPA) had been reached. He also held talks with European Council President António Costa at the Europa building to strengthen Euro–Indonesian ties. Later, he paid a visit to King Philippe of Belgium at the Palace of Laeken.	
11	France	Paris	13–15 July	At the request of French president Emmanuel Macron, Prabowo attended Bastille Day festivities at the Champs-Élysées as the guest of honor. His appearance made a significant moment as it was the first time contingents from the Indonesian National Armed Forces and Police served as honorary troops in the military parade. Later, Prabowo joined Macron for a working dinner at the Élysée Palace.	
11	Belarus	Minsk	15 July	Prabowo ended his 15-day diplomatic journey with a brief visit to Minsk to expand Indonesia's trade ties with Belarus. He met with Belarusian president Aleksandr Lukashenko and discussed a variety of issues.	
12	Singapore		9 August	Prabowo attended the 2025 Singapore National Day parade held at the National Gallery. He also had meetings with former prime minister Lee Hsien Loong and Prime Minister Lawrence Wong. Prabowo was also invited to the stage of honor and introduced to the Singaporean audience.	
13	China	Beijing	3 September	Despite initially cancelling his travel due to protests, Prabowo flew to Beijing and attended the 2025 China Victory Day Parade in Tiananmen Square. He also held bilateral meetings with Chinese president Xi Jinping and Russian president Vladimir Putin.	
14	Qatar	Doha	12 September	In response to the Israeli attack on Doha, Prabowo decided to visit the city as a direct expression of Indonesian solidarity and support for Qatar's leadership and people. He held a discussion with Qatari Emir Sheikh Tamim bin Hamad Al Thani at Lusail Palace, expressing his desire for humane, just, and peaceful conversation in order to create a more secure future.	
14	United Arab Emirates	Abu Dhabi	12 September	Prabowo continued his journey to Abu Dhabi a few hours after his visit to Doha. He spoke with Emirati president Sheikh Mohamed bin Zayed Al Nahyan on the growing Middle East crisis and other international security issues. They also concentrated on strengthening Indonesia–UAE bilateral cooperation.	
15	Japan	Osaka	20 September	Prabowo traveled to Osaka and inspected the Indonesian Pavilion at Expo 2025 in support of Indonesia's participation in the international event that will highlight innovation, cultural legacy, and a sustainable vision.	
15	United States	New York City	20–24 September	On 22 September, Prabowo addressed his nation at the Eightieth session of the United Nations General Assembly. He also held bilateral meetings with UN secretary general António Guterres and Bill Gates, bestowing him Indonesia's highest civilian honor. The next day, he delivered a speech at the UN session's General Debate. At the request of US president Donald Trump, Prabowo also joined a Multilateral Meeting on the Middle East alongside other Muslim world leaders at the Consultation Room of the UN Security Council. He would later meet FIFA President Gianni Infantino.	
15	Canada	Ottawa	24 September	After attending the UN General Assembly, Prabowo travelled to Ottawa. He first held a bilateral meeting with Governor General Mary Simon at Rideau Hall. He would later sign the Canada–Indonesia Comprehensive Economic Partnership Agreement in Parliament Hill with Canadian prime minister Mark Carney. Prabowo also attended a state banquet hosted by Carney at the National Gallery of Canada.	
15	Netherlands	Amsterdam	25–26 September	During his trip, Prabowo visited Huis Ten Bosch and held meetings with King Willem-Alexander and Queen Máxima Zorreguieta. The trip had the objective of maintaining positive Dutch–Indonesian ties, especially their collaboration in science and culture.	
16	Egypt	Sharm El Sheikh	13 October	Prabowo attended the 2025 Gaza peace summit. Joining other leaders at the meeting, he watched as representatives of Israel and Palestine signed a ceasefire deal negotiated by Egypt and the US.	
17	Malaysia	Kuala Lumpur	25–28 October	Prabowo attended the 47th ASEAN Summit, where he and other Southeast Asian leaders signed the Declaration on the Admission of Timor-Leste into ASEAN. He also participated in the 13th ASEAN–US Summit, the 28th ASEAN–Japan Summit, the 28th ASEAN Plus Three Summit, and the 26th ASEAN–ROK Summit.	
18	South Korea	Gyeongju	30 October–1 November	Prabowo attended the APEC South Korea 2025. He also held a bilateral meeting with New Zealand prime minister Christopher Luxon and South Korean president Lee Jae Myung, reaffirming their commitment to working together to develop the KAI KF-21 Boramae fighter plane.	
19	Australia	Sydney	11–12 November	Prabowo met with Australian prime minister Anthony Albanese in Kirribilli House to discuss the future of their bilateral relations. The two leaders witnessed the signing of a bilateral Treaty on Common Security. He also held meetings with Governor General Sam Mostyn at Admiralty House, as well as former prime minister Paul Keating.	
20	Pakistan	Islamabad	8–9 December	Upon landing on PAF Base Nur Khan, Prabowo was welcomed by Pakistani president Asif Ali Zardari and Prime Minister Shehbaz Sharif with full military honors. The next day, he and Sharif held a bilateral meeting to strengthen bilateral ties. At the Aiwan-e-Sadr, Prabowo received the Nishan-e-Pakistan during a special investiture ceremony.	
20	Russia	Moscow	10 December	Prabowo held talks with Russian president Vladimir Putin at the Grand Kremlin Palace, showing appreciation for the excellent ties between the two nations. The two leaders discussed wheat exports as well as military and energy ties.	

== 2026 ==
#	Country	Areas visited	Dates	Details	Image
21	United Kingdom	London	18–21 January	Prabowo held talks with British prime minister Keir Starmer at 10 Downing Street. The meeting's agenda encompassed discussions on key matters pertaining to the enhancement of cooperation between the two nations. He later attended a luncheon with Deputy Prime Minister David Lammy at Lancaster House to initiate bilateral trade. The next day, Prabowo met King Charles III at Lancaster House to discuss environmental sustainability, with an emphasis on the protection of wildlife and the conservation of elephants.	
21	Switzerland	Zurich; Davos	21–23 January	Prabowo attended the 56th World Economic Forum in Davos. There, He emphasized the new Danantara sovereign wealth fund and his social policies since becoming president. Prabowo also joined other world leaders attending the forum in signing the Board of Peace Charter.	
21	France	Paris	23–24 January	Prabowo attended a banquet hosted by French president Emmanuel Macron at the Élysée Palace. The two leaders highlighted the strategic bilateral cooperation between France and Indonesia in various sectors.	
22	United States	Prince George's County; Washington, D.C.	17–21 February	Prabowo attended the Board of Peace summit, expressing support for US president Donald Trump's 20-point Gaza peace plan. He also held a bilateral meeting with Trump covering a trade agreement and other issues.	
22	United Kingdom	London	23–24 February	Following his visit to the US, Prabowo visited the UK to observe the signing of a framework agreement between the British semiconductor company Arm Limited and the Danantara Investment Management Agency.	
22	Jordan	Amman	24–25 February	Following his visit to the UK, Prabowo visited Jordan and was received a ceremonial escort before landing. The next day, he held talks with King Abdullah II of Jordan at Basman Palace regarding regional situations.	
22	United Arab Emirates	Abu Dhabi	25–26 February	Following his visit to Jordan, Prabowo visited the UAE. At Qasr Al Bahr Palace, he met with Emirati president Sheikh Mohammed bin Zayed Al Nahyan and the leaders of six other emirates for a series of diplomatic meetings.	
23	Japan	Tokyo	29–31 March	As part of an official visit to discuss several strategic issues, Prabowo made a courtesy call on Emperor Naruhito at the Tokyo Imperial Palace. The next day, he held a summit with Japanese prime minister Sanae Takaichi. The two leaders agreed to improve communication between their foreign ministers and leaders in order to further solidify their strategic alliance.	
23	South Korea	Seoul	31 March–2 April	Prabowo held a summit with South Korean president Lee Jae Myung. The two presidents decided to raise bilateral relations to a 'special comprehensive strategic partnership' and boost resource and security cooperation in response to the 2026 Strait of Hormuz crisis. In recognition of Prabowo's efforts to foster cordial ties between the two nations, Lee granted him the Grand Order of Mugunghwa.	
24	Russia	Moscow	13 April	Prabowo met with Russian president Vladimir Putin at the Grand Kremlin Palace to discuss a variety of strategic matters and to look into ways to improve bilateral cooperation in a number of areas. Following the meeting, the agenda included a brief tête-à-tête session over a luncheon at the Kremlin's Blue Hall.	
24	France	Paris	13–14 April	During a meeting with French president Emmanuel Macron at the Élysée Palace, Prabowo talked about enhancing collaboration in defense, energy, and the creative sector.	
25	Philippines	Lapu-Lapu City	7–9 May	Prabowo attended the 48th ASEAN Summit at the Mactan Expo in Cebu, reflecting Indonesia's dedication to bolstering ASEAN solidarity and unity. He also attended the BIMP-EAGA Special Summit on Thursday.	
26	France	Paris	26–29 May	Prabowo visited France as a move to strengthen ties between the two nations. During a joint statement with French president Emmanuel Macron at the Élysée Palace, Prabowo welcomed the formation of the France-Indonesia High-Level Business Council as a strategic step toward strengthening commercial and investment cooperation. The two leaders discussed shared strategic priorities, including defense cooperation, clean energy development, education, research, and IEU-CEPA implementation.	
27	Russia	Vladivostok	2–4 September	Prabowo attended the 11th Eastern Economic Forum in Vladivostok as the chief guest of honor. On 3 September, he held a bilateral meeting with Russian president Vladimir Putin.	
28	India	New Delhi	11–13 September	Prabowo attended the 18th BRICS summit, reflecting Indonesia's commitment to enhancing its role in multilateral cooperation.	
29	Philippines	Manila; Pasay; Parañaque	14–18 November	Prabowo attended the 49th ASEAN Summit, the 29th ASEAN-China Summit, the 6th ASEAN-Australia Summit, the 27th ASEAN-Republic of Korea Summit, the 29th ASEAN-Japan Summit, the 23rd ASEAN-India Summit, and the 21st East Asia Summit at the Philippine International Convention Center, and the Special ASEAN-U.S. Summit at Solaire Resort.	
29	China	Shenzhen	18–19 November	Prabowo attended the APEC China 2026 at the Shenzhen International Communication Center, showcasing Indonesia's commitment to enhancing economic cooperation and growth within the Asia-Pacific region. He also attended a gala dinner, where he was warmly welcomed by Chinese President Xi Jinping and participated in a group photo with fellow world leaders.	

== Multilateral meetings ==
The following multilateral meetings were scheduled to take place during Prabowo's 2024–2029 term in office.

Group	Year				
Group	2024	2025	2026	2027	2028
APEC	15–16 November; Peru; Lima	31 October–1 November; South Korea; Gyeongju	18–19 November; China; Shenzhen	TBA; Vietnam	TBA, Mexico
BRICS	Before accession	6–7 July; Brazil; Rio de Janeiro	12–13 September; India; New Delhi	TBA	TBA
EAS (ASEAN)	Before inauguration	26–28 October (Note: While Prabowo attended the ASEAN Summit, Foreign Minister Sugiono attended the EAS in his place.); Malaysia; Kuala Lumpur	16–18 November; Philippines; Manila	TBA; Singapore	TBA; Thailand
G20	18–19 November; Brazil; Rio de Janeiro	22–23 November (Note: Vice President Gibran Rakabuming Raka attended the G20 Summit in his place.); South Africa; Johannesburg	14–15 December; United States; Miami	TBA	TBA
Others	19 December; 11th D-8 summit Egypt; Cairo	15–17 June; 51st G7 summit Canada; Kananaskis	17–19 June; 4th ASEAN–Russia summit (Note: Foreign Minister Sugiono attended the ASEAN–Russia Summit in his place.); Russia; Kazan	TBA	TBA
Others	—	31 August–1 September 2025 SCO Summit; China; Tianjin	TBA	TBA	TBA
Others	—	13 October 2025 Gaza peace summit Egypt; Sharm El Sheikh	TBA	TBA	TBA
Future event Did / will not attend Event cancelled
