= Indonesia–Yugoslavia relations =

- Indonesia: Yugoslavia

Indonesia–Yugoslavia relations were historical foreign relations between now split-up Socialist Federal Republic of Yugoslavia and Indonesia. Both countries were founding member states of the Non-Aligned Movement. Two countries established formal diplomatic relations in 1954. First diplomatic documents were exchanged as early as 1947. Breakup of Yugoslavia, one of the founding and core members of the Non-Aligned Movement, brought into question the very existence of the Movement which was preserved only by politically pragmatic chairmanship of Indonesia.

== History ==
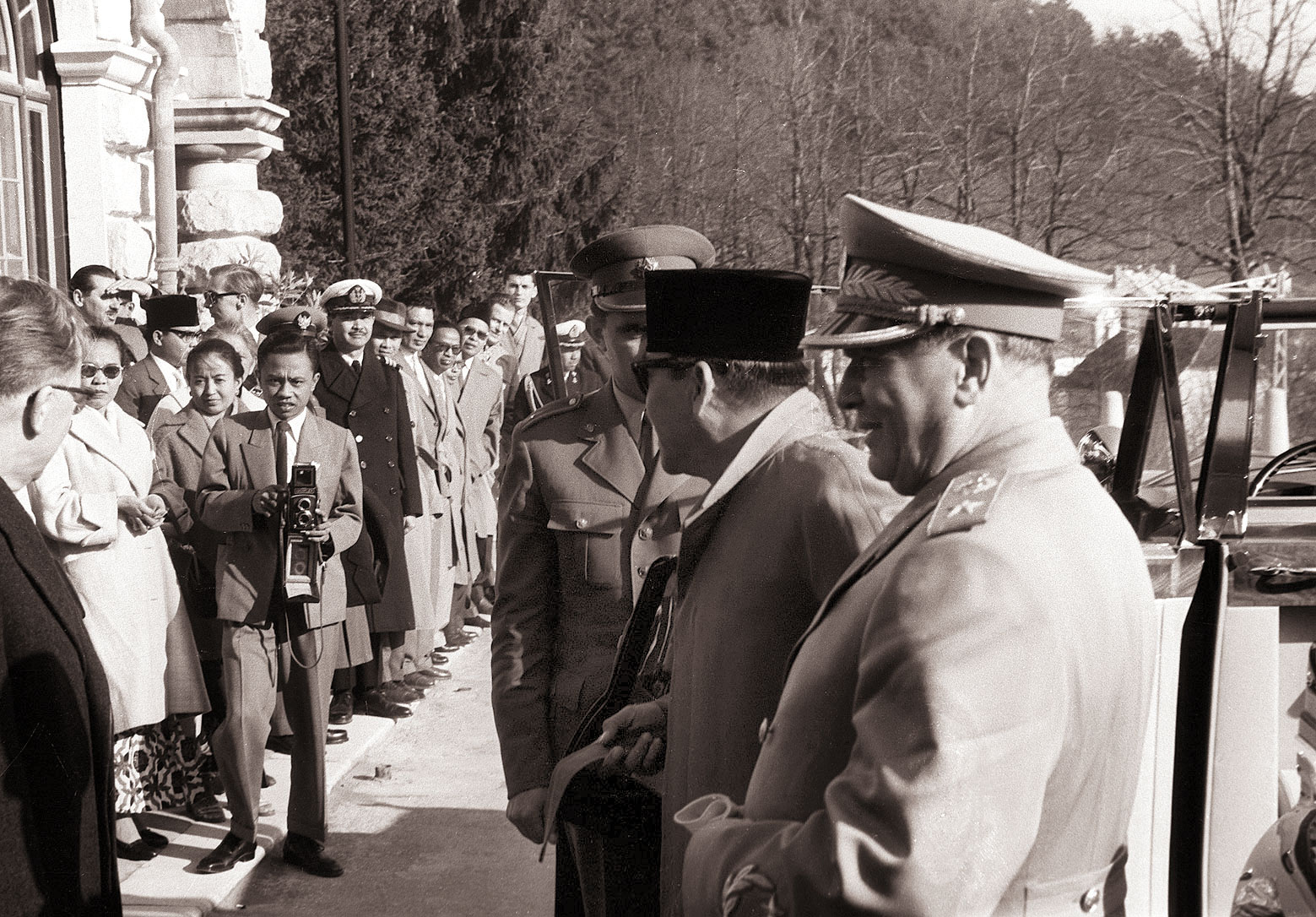
Sukarno's visit to Postojna Cave, SR Slovenia (1960).

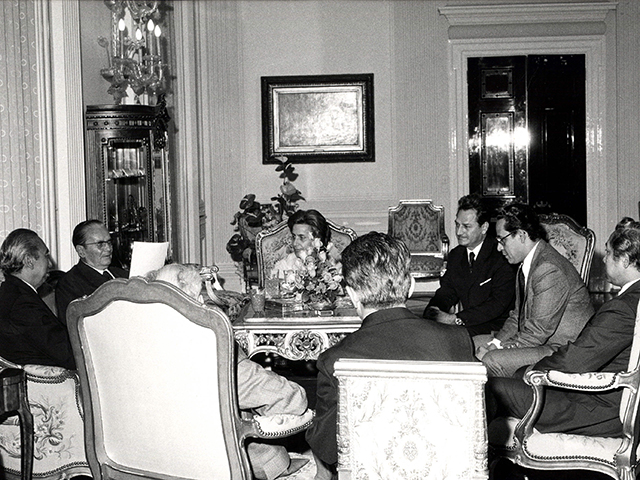
Reception of Adam Malik in Belgrade in 1974

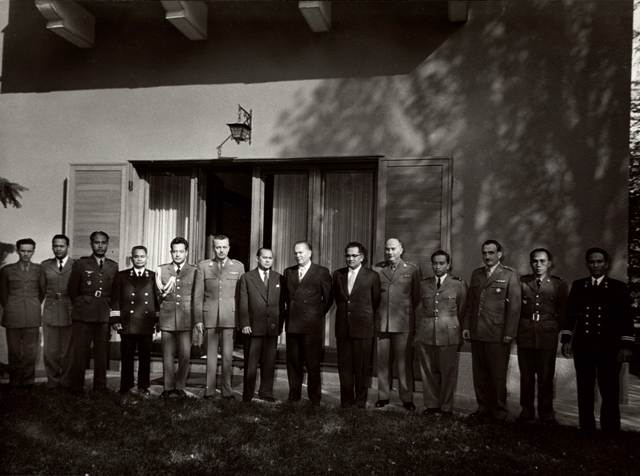
Indonesian Military delegation in Belgrade in 1957.

President of Indonesia Sukarno visited Yugoslavia on multiple occasions in 1956,1958,1960,1963 and 1964 while President of Yugoslavia Josip Broz Tito visited Indonesia in 1958 and 1967. During Sukarno's first visit in 1958 Yugoslav diplomacy perceived its guest (earlier host of the Bandung Conference) as an invaluable dialogue partner in the context of the Poznań protests of 1956, Suez Crisis, President Tito meeting with Nikita Khrushchev and the meeting between Tito, Indian Prime Minister Jawaharlal Nehru and President of Egypt Gamal Abdel Nasser on Brijuni Islands. During the 1964 visit to Belgrade Yugoslav side voiced its concerns over the Indonesia's support of what Belgrade perceived the militant Chinese Communist views on how to settle world problems contrary to Five Principles of Peaceful Coexistence.

Contrary to some other non-aligned countries which during the breakup of Yugoslavia provided diplomatic support to Federal Republic of Yugoslavia (Serbia and Montenegro), Indonesia provided its primary support to the Republic of Bosnia and Herzegovina, Yugoslav successor state with significant Muslim population. Indonesian President Suharto visited war torn Sarajevo in March 1995 to help mediate the ongoing Bosnian War conflict and to show sympathy for the Muslim population of the region. His visit came at a time of heightened conflict, when only two days earlier a UN-owned aircraft that passed through Bosnia was shot down.

== See also ==
- Yugoslavia and the Non-Aligned Movement
- Embassy of Indonesia, Belgrade
- Indonesia–Serbia relations
- Croatia–Indonesia relations
- Bosnia and Herzegovina–Indonesia relations
- 1956 Croatia v Indonesia football match
- Death and state funeral of Josip Broz Tito
- Istiklal Mosque, Sarajevo
