= Istiklal Mosque =

Istiklal Mosque may refer to one of the following:

- Istiklal Mosque, Sarajevo
- Istiqlal Mosque, Jakarta
