= Embassy of Indonesia, Belgrade =

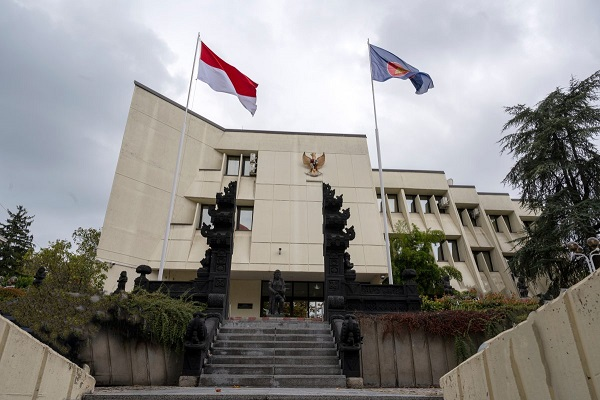
- Location: Belgrade, Serbia
- Coordinates: 44°47′15″N 20°27′21″E

The Embassy of Indonesia in Belgrade (Indonesian: Kedutaan Besar Republik Indonesia di Beograd, Serbian: Амбасада Индонезије у Београду, romanized: Ambasada Indonezije u Beogradu) is the diplomatic mission of Indonesia in Serbia.

== History ==
Indonesia and the Socialist Federal Republic of Yugoslavia established formal diplomatic relations in 1954, quickly developing close cooperation grounded in shared ideological and foreign-policy orientations.

In 1950s the embassy started publishing Upoznajte Indoneziju publication to familiarize Yugoslav audiences with Indonesia.

In 2012 the embassy announced participation of Di-džej Milinka at the Exit music festival in Novi Sad.

In 2023 the embassy facilitated inclusion of the archive of the 1st Summit of the Non-Aligned Movement into the UNESCO's Memory of the World Register in Europe and North America. The embassy facilitates other forms of cultural, economic and scientific cooperation between Serbia and Indonesia. Those include visiting various locations beyond Belgrade, including multiple visits by ambassador of Indonesia to Subotica where meetings between mayor and ambassador of Indonesia took place at the Subotica City Hall in 2022, 2017 and 2012.

== See also ==
- Indonesia–Serbia relations
- Indonesia–Yugoslavia relations
