= Bosnia and Herzegovina–Indonesia relations =

- Bosnia and Herzegovina: Indonesia

Bosnia and Herzegovina–Indonesia relations refers to the bilateral relations between Bosnia and Herzegovina and Indonesia. Bosnia and Herzegovina has an embassy in Jakarta, while Indonesia has an embassy in Sarajevo. The bilateral relations was initially motivated by humanity and religious solidarity. As a nation with the largest Muslim population, Indonesians were shocked by the ethnic cleansing against Muslim Bosniaks during the Bosnian War, and promptly organized and mobilized help. Indonesian support for Bosnia and Herzegovina ranged from collecting donations, sending peacekeeping forces under United Nations, to building the Istiqlal Mosque in Sarajevo.

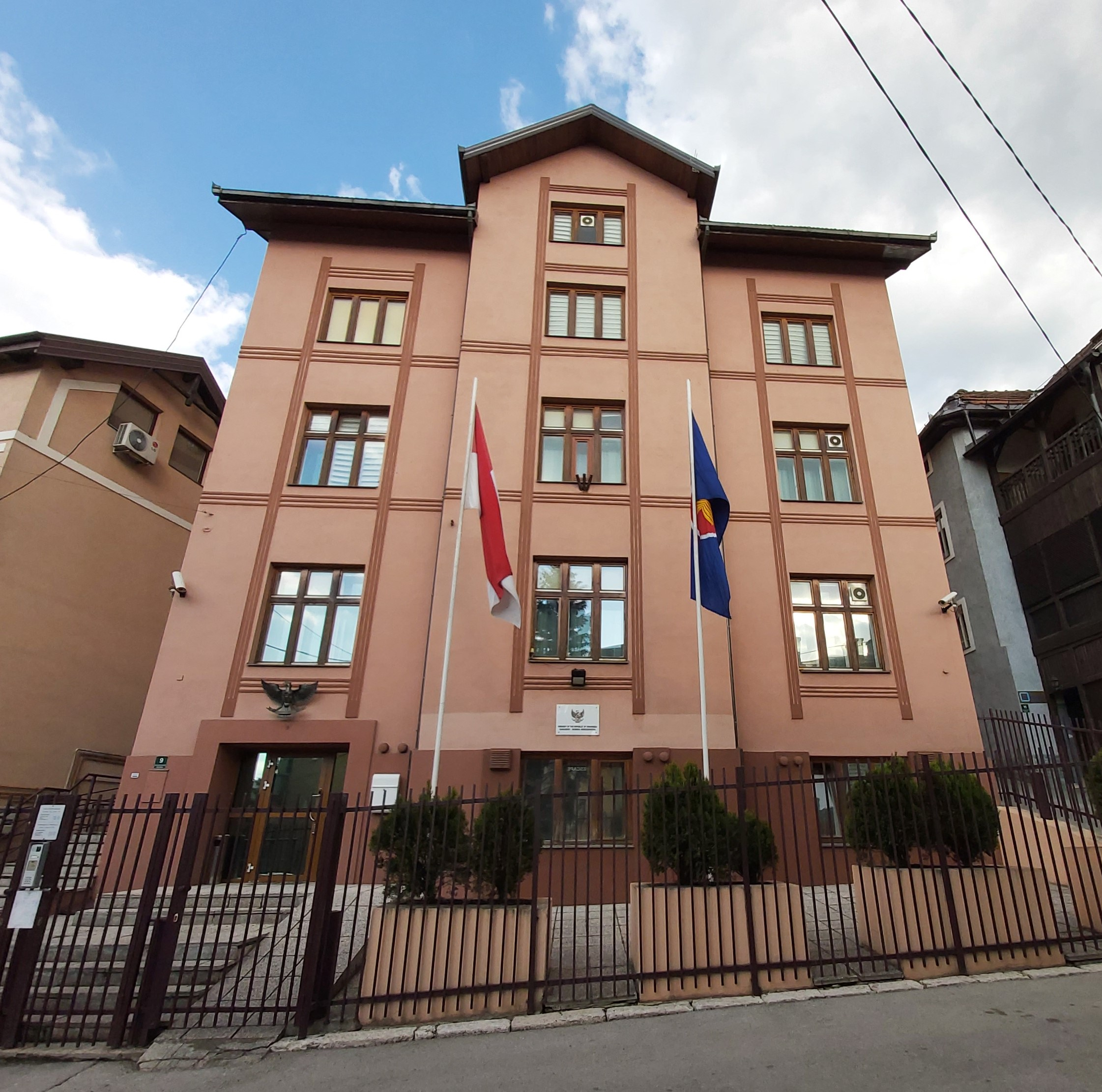
Embassy of Indonesia in Sarajevo

== History ==
Indonesia recognized Bosnia and Herzegovina following the breakup of Yugoslavia on 20 May 1992. Formal diplomatic ties between the two nations were established on 11 April 1994. Indonesia also contributed to peace and security efforts by sending peacekeeping troops in the country from 1992 to 1996 under United Nations Protection Force (UNPROFOR). Indonesian military observer contingent was led by future Indonesian President Susilo Bambang Yudhoyono, then a brigadier general, was chief military observer under UNPROFOR in Bosnia and Herzegovina in 1995–1996.

Indonesian President Suharto visited Sarajevo in March 1995 to help mediate the ongoing Bosnian War conflict and to show sympathy for the Muslim population of the region. His visit came at a time of heightened conflict, when only two days earlier a UN-owned aircraft that passed through Bosnia was shot down.

The government of Bosnia and Herzegovina established their embassy in Jakarta in 1998. In the period 1994-2010, Indonesian interests in Bosnia and Herzegovina was conducted through the Indonesian embassy in Budapest, and the Indonesian embassy in Sarajevo was finally established on 10 November 2010.

In 2001, the Istiqlal Mosque (one of Sarajevo's largest mosques) was inaugurated by Indonesian Minister of Religious Affairs in September 2001. The mosque was initiated by Indonesian President Suharto in 1995 as a gift for the people of Bosnia and Herzegovina, to replace the hundreds of mosques destroyed during the Bosnian War. The mosque is sometimes referred by locals as the Suharto Mosque.

== High level visits ==
Indonesian President Suharto visited Sarajevo in March 1995. A delegation of MPR Indonesian Parliament visited Bosnia and Herzegovina in May 2000. In September 2001, Indonesian Minister of Religious Affair Said Agil Al Munawar visited the capital city Sarajevo to inaugurate the Indonesian-aided "Istiqlal" Mosque. President Megawati Soekarnoputri also visited Sarajevo in September 2002. In December 2004, Foreign Minister Mladen Ivanic visited Indonesia. In 15–16 March 2007 Indonesian Minister of Foreign Affairs Hassan Wirajuda visited Sarajevo.

== Trade and investment ==
Bilateral trade between Bosnia and Herzegovina and Indonesia is minuscule which was estimated just at US$1.5 million in 2008. Indonesia chiefly exports cacao, furniture, wheat and wheat products, wood and carpet, however, the imports include electrical products, machines and mechanical equipment from Bosnia and Herzegovina.

== See also ==
- Foreign relations of Bosnia and Herzegovina
- Foreign relations of Indonesia
- Indonesia–Yugoslavia relations
- Istiklal Mosque, Sarajevo
- Yugoslavia and the Non-Aligned Movement
