= Embassy of Indonesia, Berlin =

Embassy in Berlin, Germany

Embassy of the Republic of Indonesia in Berlin Kedutaan Besar Republik Indonesia di Berlin Botschaft der Republik Indonesien in Berlin

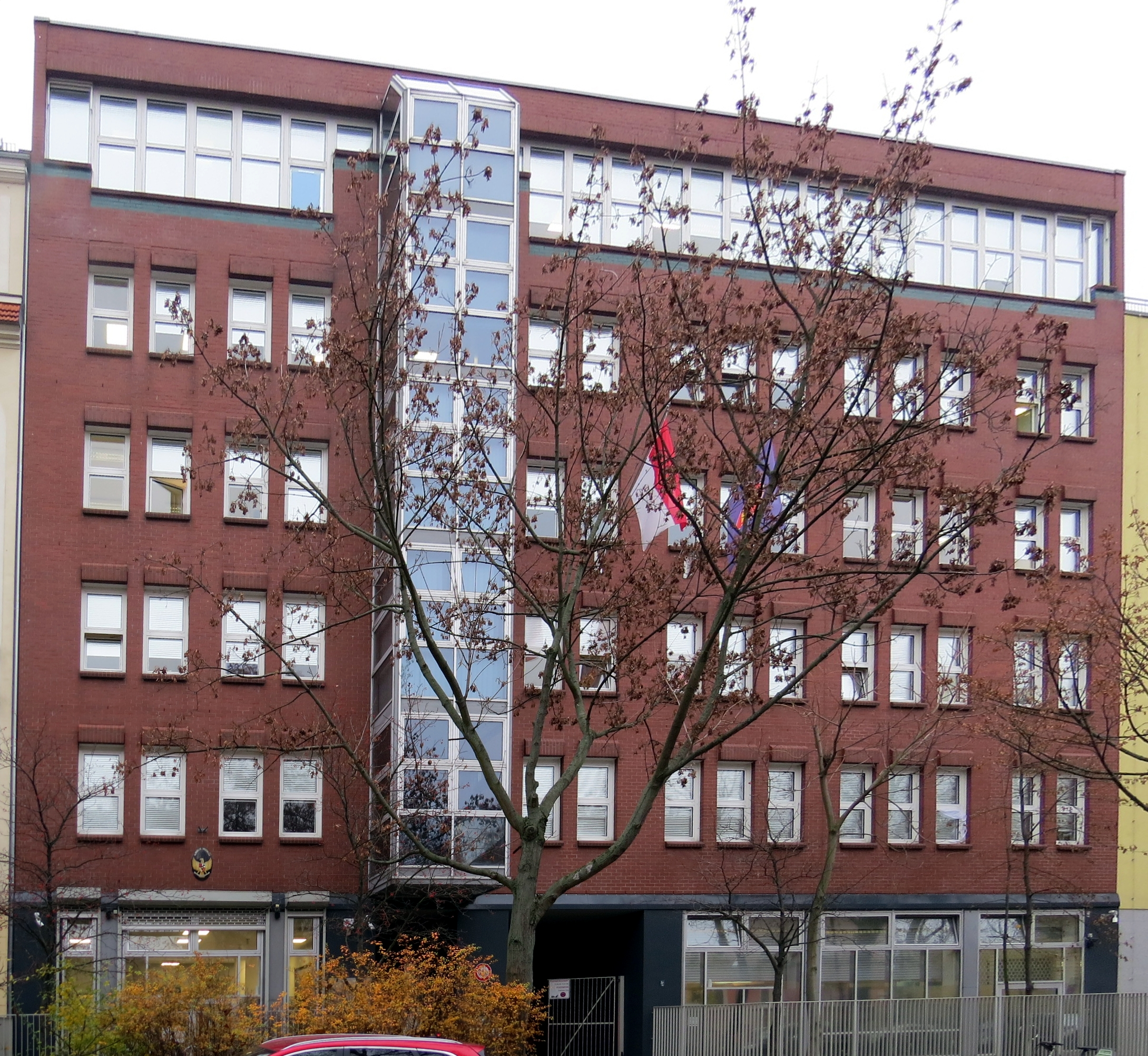
- Location: Berlin, Germany
- Address: Clara-Wieck-Str. 1; 10785 Berlin, Germany
- Coordinates: 52.509556°N 13.356734°E
- Ambassador: Arief Havas Oegroseno
- Website: indonesianembassy.de / kemlu.go.id/berlin/en

The Embassy of the Republic of Indonesia in Berlin (Indonesian: Kedutaan Besar Republik Indonesia di Berlin; German: Botschaft der Republik Indonesien in Berlin) is the diplomatic mission of the Republic of Indonesia to the Federal Republic of Germany. In addition to the embassy, Indonesia has two consulate generals in Frankfurt and Hamburg.

The first Indonesian ambassador to West Germany was Alexander Andries Maramis (1953–1956). The first Indonesian ambassador to East Germany was Suparman who was appointed in 1975. The latest ambassador to Germany, Arief Havas Oegroseno, was appointed by President Joko Widodo on 20 February 2018, and has ended his duty at December 2024.

== History ==
Diplomatic relations between Indonesia and West Germany were established in 1952. At that time, a Permanent Representative Office and consulate were initially established in Bonn. This office was elevated to embassy level in 1954. A consulate was also opened in West Berlin. In East Germany, a Permanent Representative Office was established in East Berlin in 1973, which was elevated to embassy level in 1976.

After the reunification of Germany on 3 October 1990, the Indonesian government sought to consolidate its diplomatic missions in the former two countries of East Germany and West Germany. On 17 January 1991, the embassy in the former East Berlin and the consulate in the former West Berlin were closed. In turn, a consulate general was established in the newly unified Berlin. The embassy in Bonn thus became the main diplomatic mission of Indonesia in the unified Germany. However, when the capital of Germany moved from Bonn to Berlin in 1999, the Indonesian embassy also moved to Berlin. Subsequently, the consulate general in Berlin was moved to Frankfurt.

The chancery in Bonn has been located in two separate locations. Until 1979, the chancery was located at Kurt-Schumacher-Straße (formerly named Drachenfelsstraße). In 1980, a new chancery was built at Bernkasteler Straße 2 and was used until the embassy moved to Berlin. After the embassy moved to Berlin, the Indonesian government kept ownership of the building at Bernkasteler Straße 2. It eventually was put up for sale in 2016. In 2019, the Indonesian government built a new chancery that replaced the chancery at the former location on Lehrter Strasse in Berlin. The new chancery was built on a site that the government bought in Tiergarten, Berlin's diplomatic enclave. the Embassy officially moved to the new chancery on 2 December 2024.

== Gallery ==
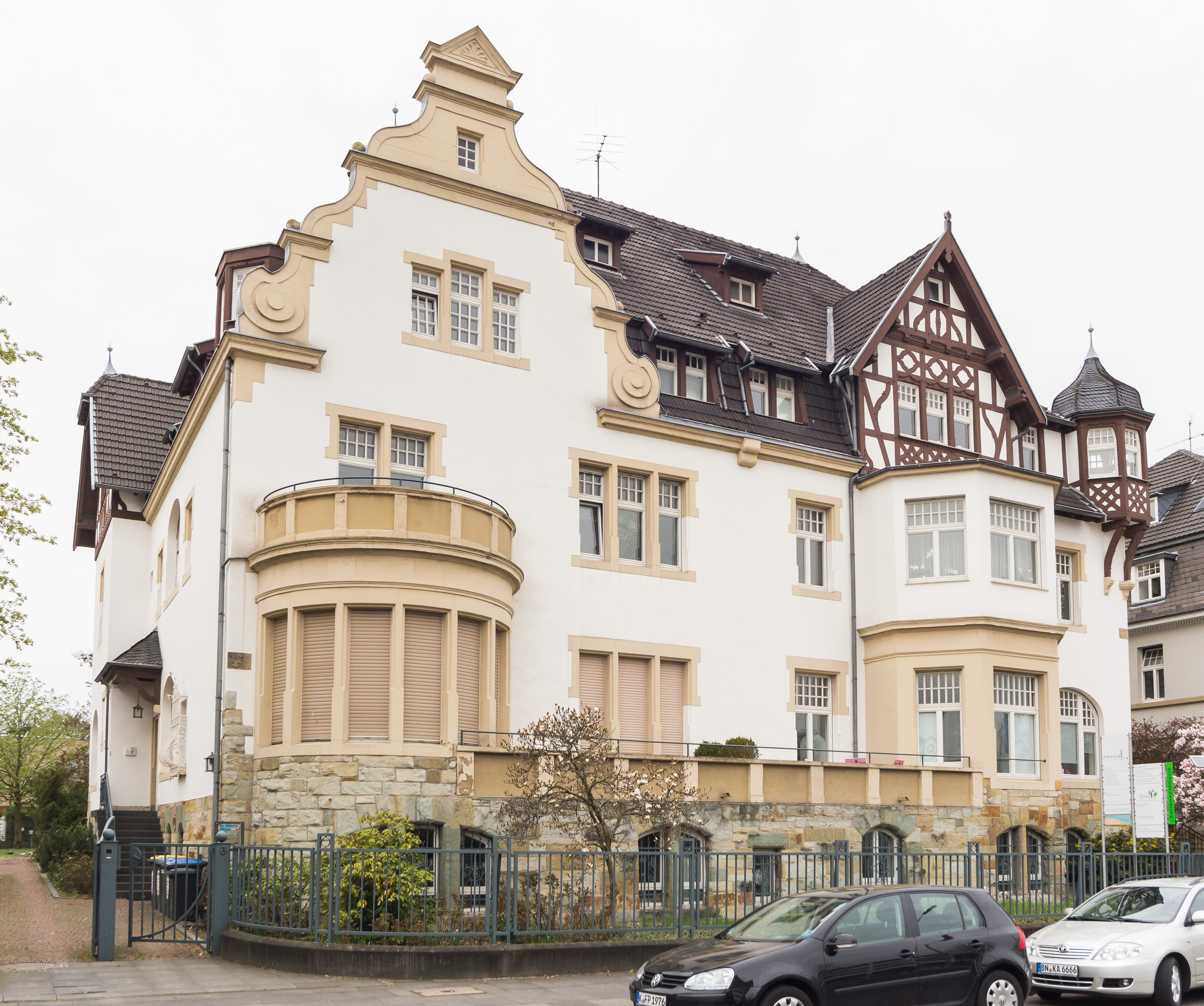
The former chancery on Kurt-Schumacher-Straße in Bonn (1953–1979)

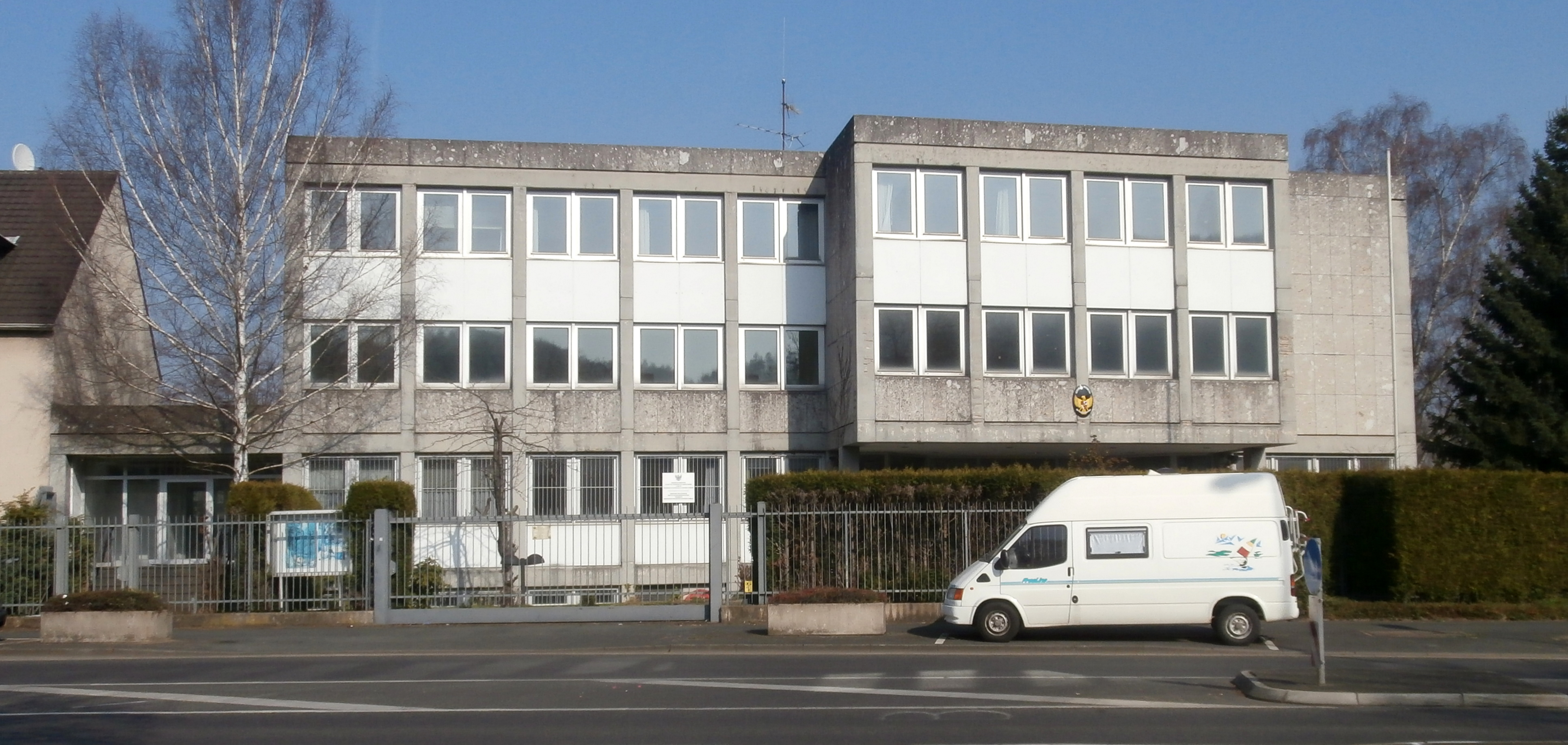
The former chancery on Bernkasteler Straße in Bonn (1980–1999)

== See also ==
- Germany–Indonesia relations
- List of diplomatic missions of Indonesia
- List of diplomatic missions of Germany
