= Embassy of Indonesia, Prague =

Embassy of the Republic of Indonesia in Prague Kedutaan Besar Republik Indonesia di Praha Velvyslanectví Indonéské republiky v Praze

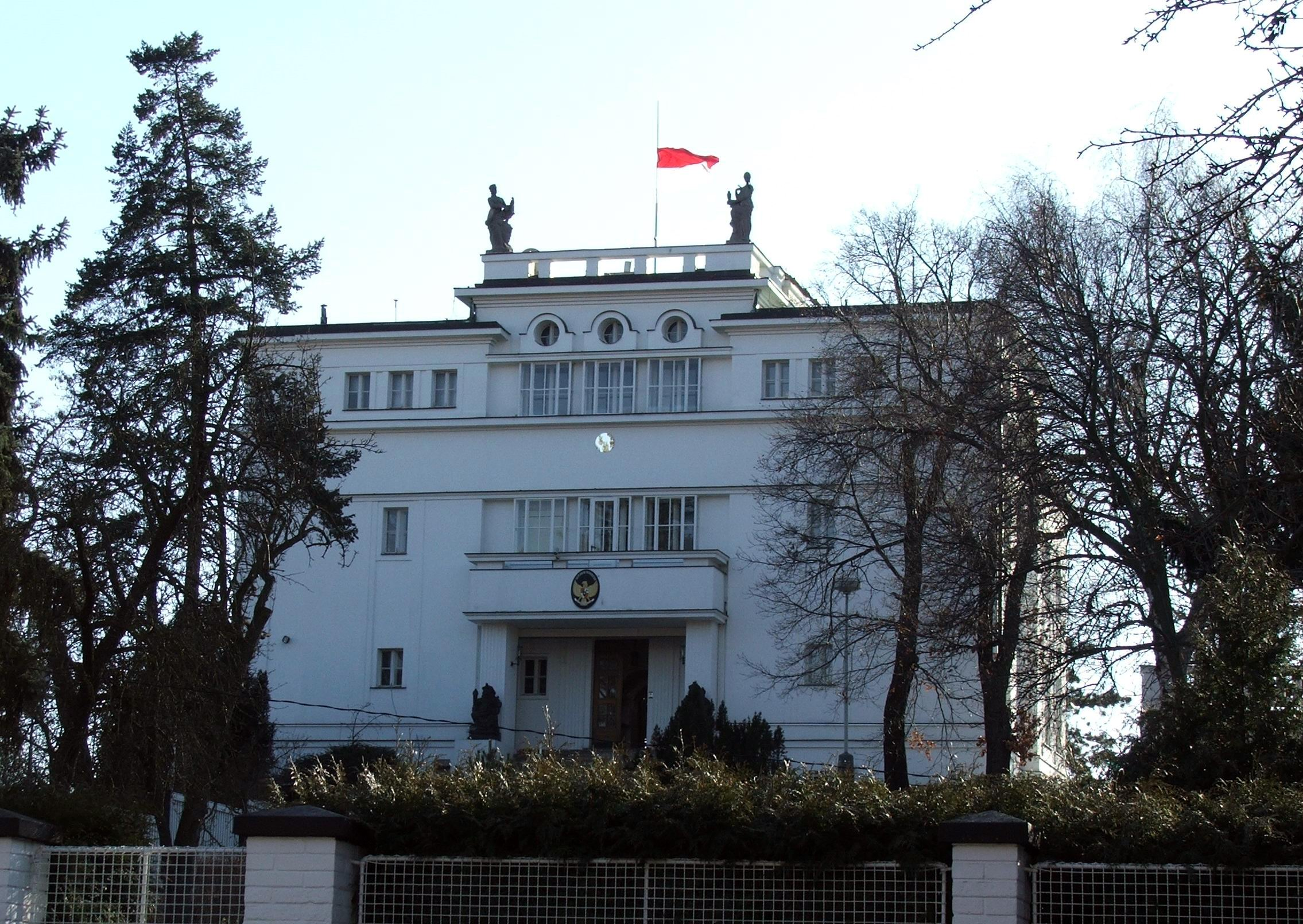
- Location: Prague, Czech Republic
- Address: Nad Buďánkami II/7, 15021; Praha 5 - Smíchov, Czech Republic
- Coordinates: 50.070991°N 14.372992°E
- Ambassador: Kenssy Dwi Ekaningsih
- Website: kemlu.go.id/prague/en

The Embassy of the Republic of Indonesia in Prague (Indonesian: Kedutaan Besar Republik Indonesia di Praha; Czech: Velvyslanectví Indonéské republiky v Praze) is the diplomatic mission of the Republic of Indonesia to the Czech Republic. The embassy was originally Indonesia's diplomatic mission to Czechoslovakia. After the country's split into the Czech Republic and Slovakia, the embassy became the diplomatic mission for the former. The first Indonesia ambassador to Czechoslovakia was Rudolf Alexander Asmaun in 1957. The current ambassador to the Czech Republic is Kenssy Dwi Ekaningsih who was appointed by President Joko Widodo on 13 February 2019.

== See also ==
- Czech Republic–Indonesia relations
- List of diplomatic missions of Indonesia
- List of diplomatic missions of Czech Republic

== Gallery ==
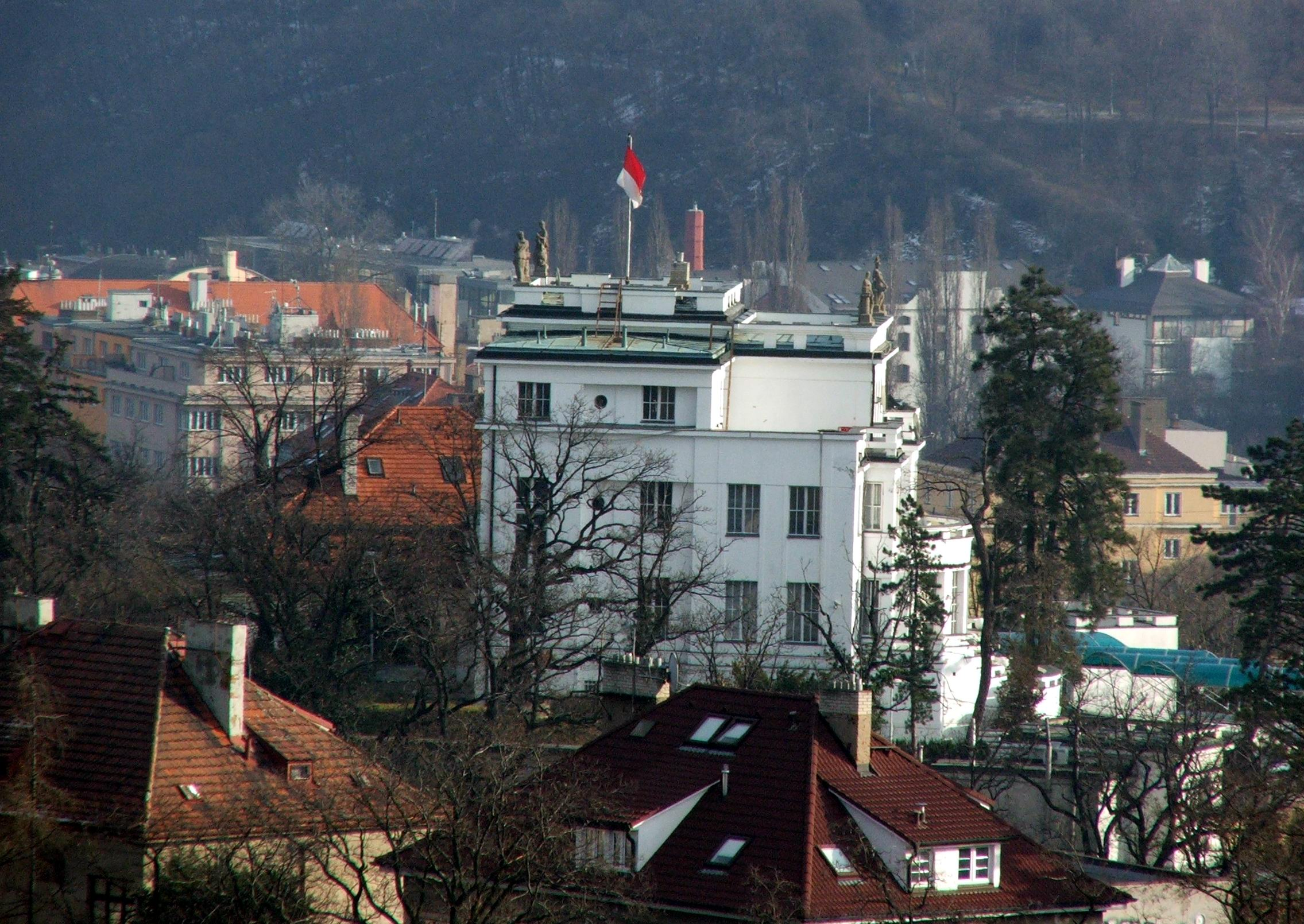
Chancery at Nad Budankami II/7

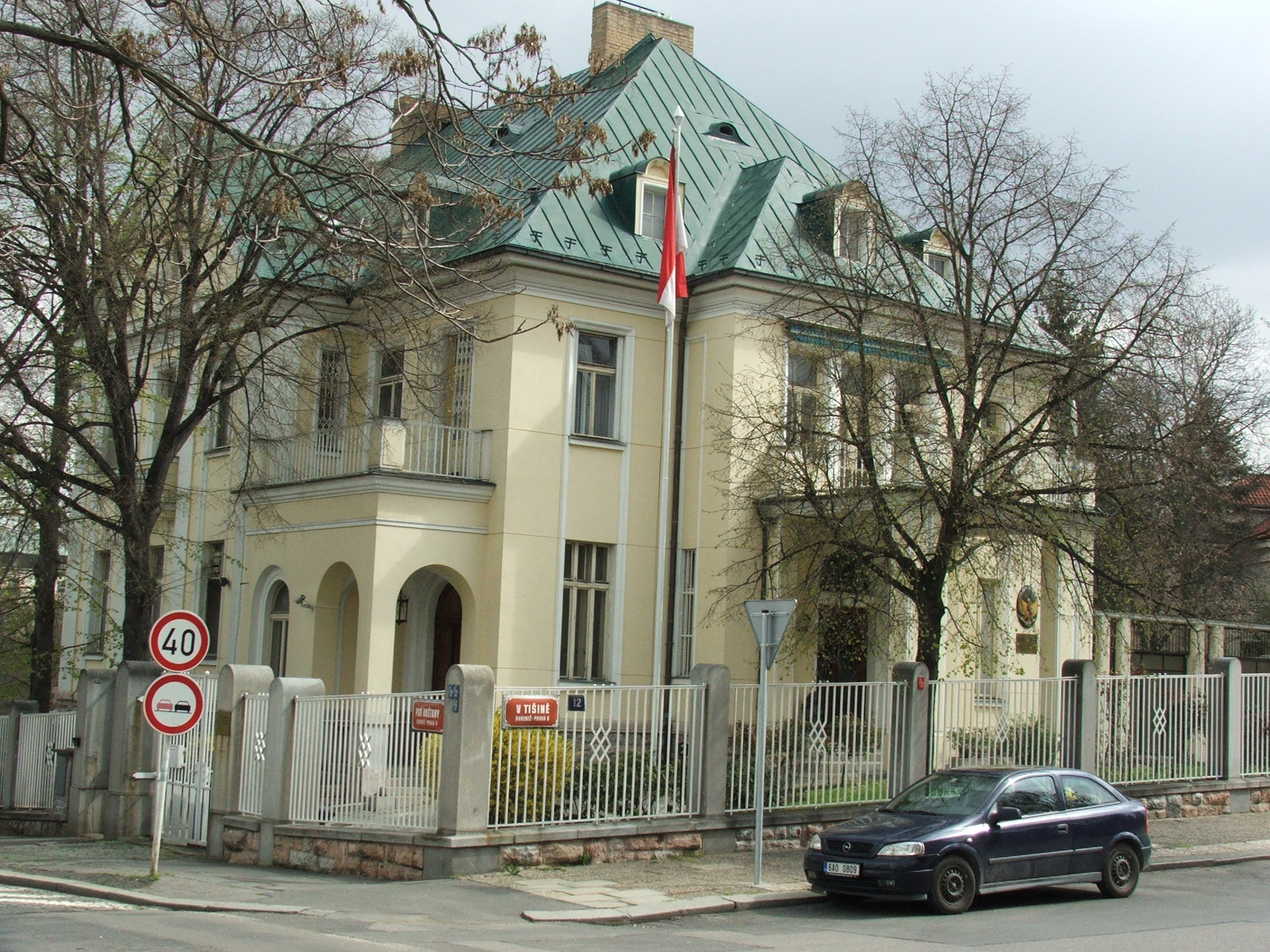
Wisma Duta, the official residence of the ambassador
