= Embassy of Indonesia, Bucharest =

Embassy of the Republic of Indonesia in Bucharest Kedutaan Besar Republik Indonesia di Bukares Ambasada Republicii Indonezia in București

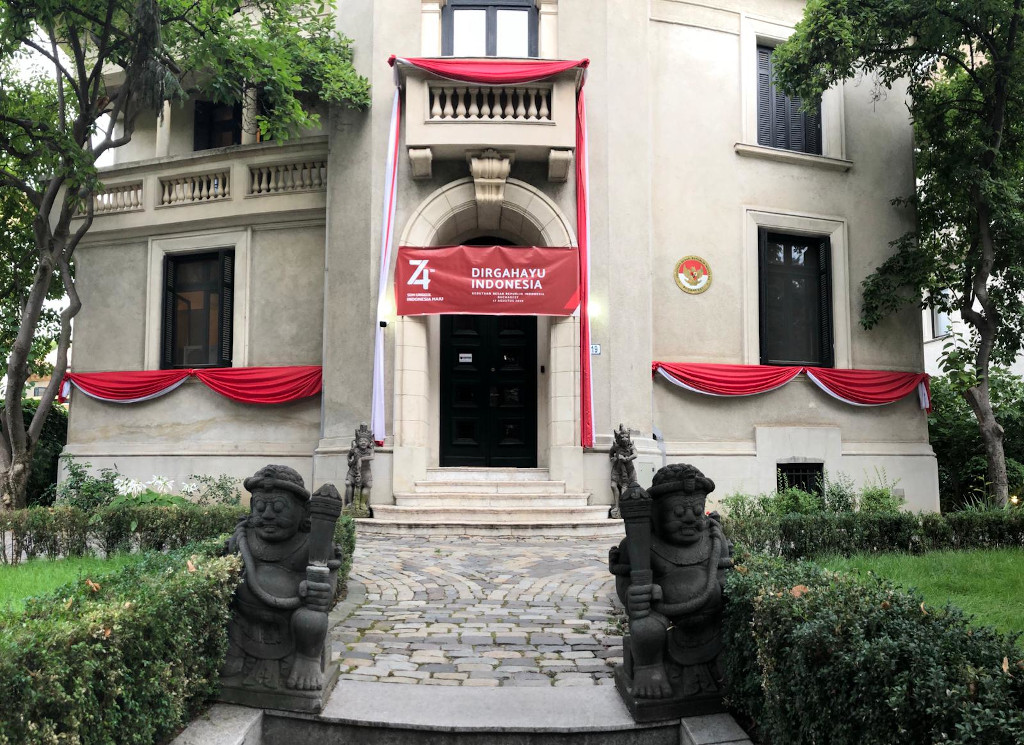
- Location: Bucharest, Romania
- Address: Strada Modrogan 4, Bucharest 011826, Romania
- Coordinates: 44.456514°N 26.08919°E
- Ambassador: Meidyatama Suryodiningrat
- Jurisdiction: Romania; Moldova
- Website: kemlu.go.id/bucharest/en

The Embassy of the Republic of Indonesia in Bucharest (Indonesian: Kedutaan Besar Republik Indonesia di Bukares; Romanian: Ambasada Republicii Indonezia in București) is the diplomatic mission of the Republic of Indonesia to Romania and is concurrently accredited to the Republic of Moldova. The first Indonesian ambassador to Romania was Soekrisno (1961–1965). The current ambassador, Meidyatama Suryodiningrat, was appointed by President Joko Widodo in June 2023.

== History ==
Diplomatic relations between Indonesia and Romania were established in 1950. On 5 July 1958, the two countries agreed to open diplomatic missions at the level of a legation. Subsequently, on 14 April 1960, the diplomatic missions were elevated to the level of an embassy.

On 13 March 1961, a team headed by Counselor Marzuki from the Indonesian Department of Foreign Affairs arrived in Bucharest to establish a diplomatic mission. A temporary office for the embassy was set up in the Athenee Palace Hotel. In April 1961, the first Indonesian ambassador to Romania, Soekrisno, arrived in Bucharest. On 23 May 1961, the embassy offices moved from the Athenee Palace Hotel to the first chancery located at Strada Biserica Popa Chitu 18. Ambassador Soekrisno and his family moved to the official residence of the ambassador (or Wisma Duta) at Strada Paris 37, Bucharest.

In July 1982, the chancery moved to Strada Orlando 10 (the street is currently named Strada Gina Patrichi). The chancery at that location was officially dedicated by Ambassador Muhamad Isnaeni on 5 August 1983. The current chancery is located on Aleea Alexandru.

== See also ==
- Indonesia–Romania relations
- List of diplomatic missions of Indonesia
- List of diplomatic missions of Romania
