= Indonesia–Serbia relations =

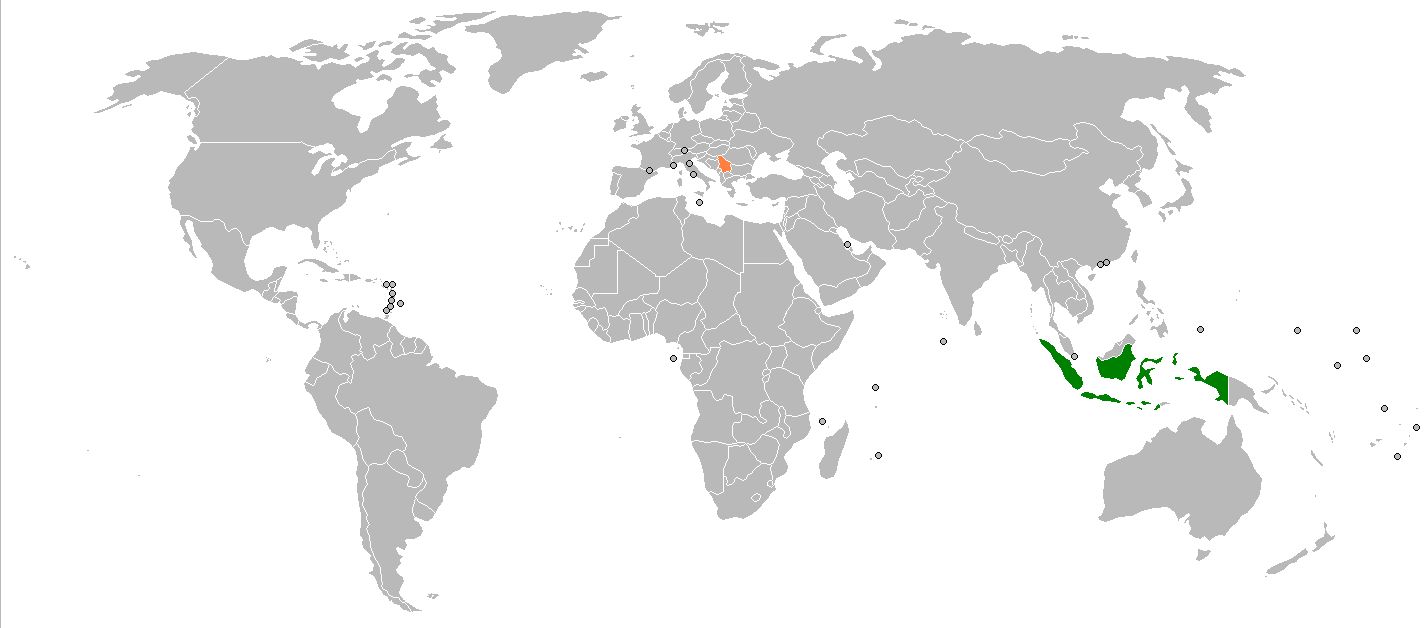
- Indonesia: Serbia

Indonesia and Serbia maintain diplomatic relations established between Indonesia and SFR Yugoslavia in 1954. From 1954 to 2006, Indonesia maintained relations with the Socialist Federal Republic of Yugoslavia (SFRY) and the Federal Republic of Yugoslavia (FRY) (later Serbia and Montenegro), of which Serbia is considered shared (SFRY) or sole (FRY) legal successor.

== History ==
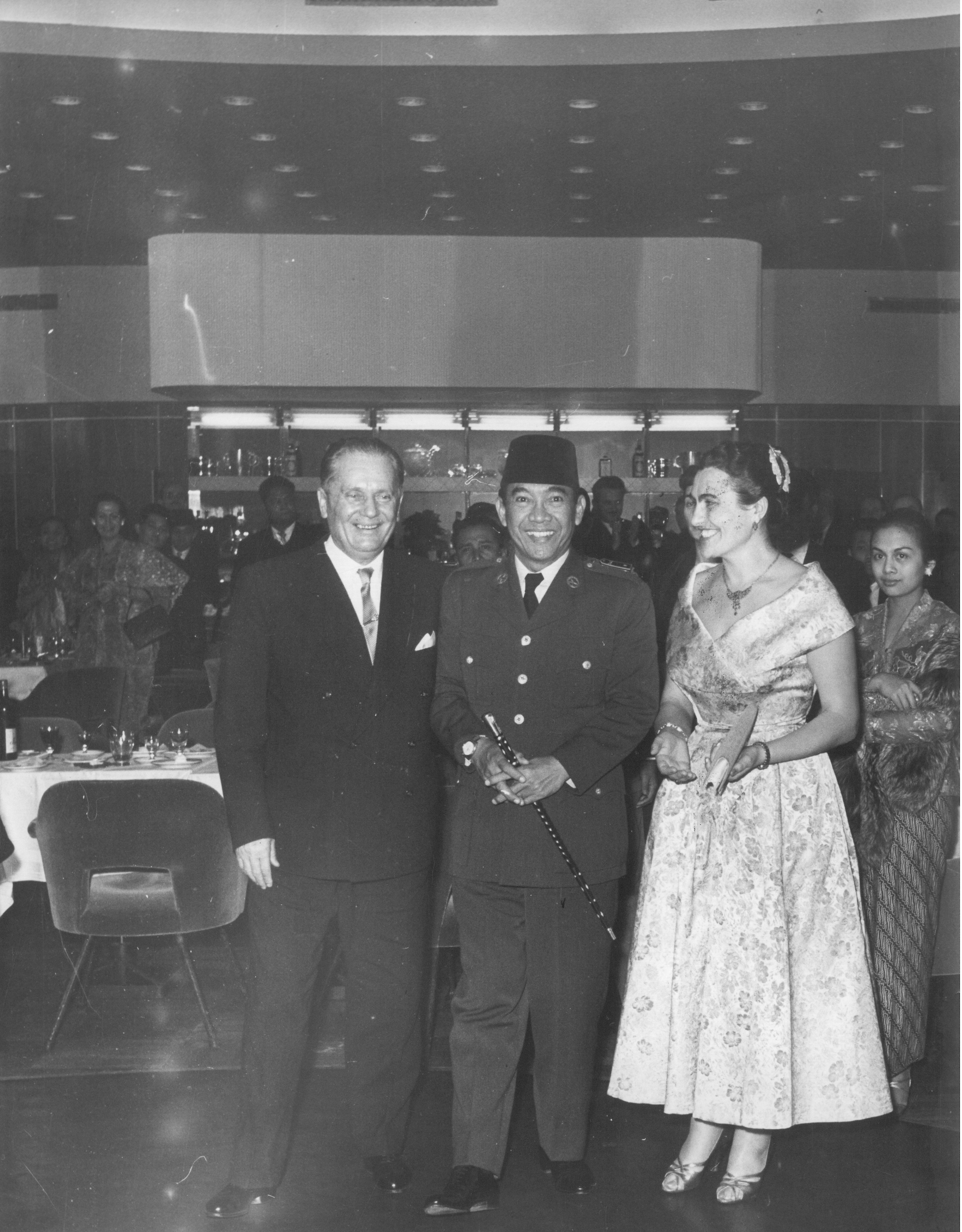
Josip Broz Tito (left) with Sukarno (center), 1958

The bilateral relations was officially established on 4 November 1954. The historic political links between Indonesia and Serbia was Non Aligned Movement. Indonesian first President Sukarno and Yugoslavian President Josip Broz Tito was the founding fathers of the Non-Aligned Movement back in 1961.

After the breakup of Yugoslavia, followed by the Bosnian War in 1992–1995, the bilateral relations hit the lowest level, since Indonesia as the world largest Muslim-populated country, condemned the crime of ethnic-cleansing based upon race and religion, against Muslim Bosniaks committed by the Serbs. Naturally, some of Indonesian Muslims shared and demonstrated the solidarity with Muslim Bosniaks.

The bilateral relations returned to normality in 2000s. In 2008, Indonesia supports the territorial integrity of Serbia by not recognizing the independence of Kosovo. Nevertheless, Indonesia has urged Serbia to always follow the peaceful way through dialog to resolving the conflicts and addressing the separatist problems in Kosovo.

To commemorate the 60th anniversary of Indonesia–Serbia bilateral relations, an Indonesian Cultural Night was performed during the 36th International Fair of Tourism in Belgrade, on February 25, 2014. The cultural performance featuring Indonesian traditional dances, exhibition and batik fashion show.

== Indonesia's stance on Kosovo ==
Indonesia backs Serbia's position regarding Kosovo and its reaction to the 2008 Kosovo declaration of independence is one of non-recognition.

== Economic relations ==
Trade between two countries amounted to $229 million in 2023; Indonesia's merchandise export to Serbia were about $224 million; Serbian exports were standing at $5 million. Indonesian export to Serbia include textile and agricultural products, while Serbian export to Indonesia include machinery, chemicals, and health appliances.

== Resident diplomatic missions ==
- Indonesia has an embassy in Belgrade.
- Serbia has an embassy in Jakarta.
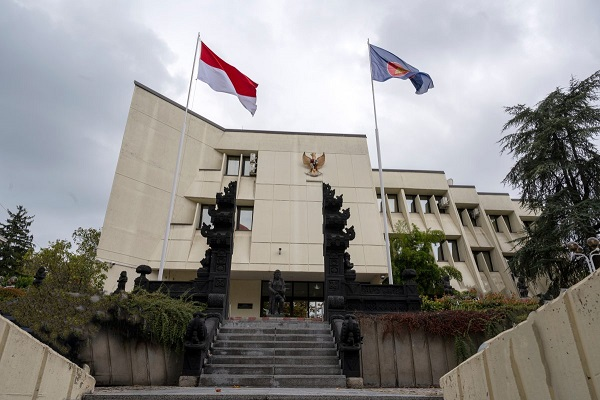
Embassy of Indonesia, Belgrade

== See also ==
- Foreign relations of Indonesia
- Foreign relations of Serbia
- Indonesia–Yugoslavia relations
- Yugoslavia and the Non-Aligned Movement

== Literature ==
- Dimić, Ljubodrag; Raković, Aleksandar; Milošević, Miladin (2015). Yugoslavia-Indonesia 1945-1967: Research and documentation (PDF). Belgrade-Jakarta: Archives of Yugoslavia, National Archives of The Republic of Indonesia. Archived from the original (PDF) on 2021-05-22.
