= Indonesia–Romania relations =

- Indonesia: Romania

Diplomatic mission
- Embassy of Indonesia, Bucharest: Embassy of Romania, Jakarta

Indonesia and Romania established diplomatic relations on 20 February 1950, two days following Romania's recognition of Indonesian sovereignty on 18 February 1950. Indonesia and Romania have agreed to enhance cooperation in the trade sector. The nations are expecting the other to be the gate to enter each regional market: Indonesia as the gate to enter the ASEAN market and Romania as the gate to enter the European Union's. Indonesia has an embassy in Bucharest and Romania has an embassy in Jakarta.

== History ==
Following the establishment of diplomatic relations, the governments of Romania and Indonesia decided to establish diplomatic missions on 5 July 1958. Under Sukarno's presidency from 1950 to 1968, relations were thriving.

The founding of the first Indonesian Embassy in Bucharest on 13 March 1960, signified the start of the diplomatic relations between Indonesia and Romania. President Sukarno's first state visit to Romania in April 1960 confirmed the need for the two nations' relationship to be further developed. A joint statement on the bilateral relations between the two nations was signed by President Sukarno and H.E. Ion Gheorghe Maurer, the Head of State for Romania at the time, during the state visit.

The communist uprising in Indonesia was put down in September 1965. The New Order administration restored Indonesia's fundamentally active and autonomous foreign policy ideals. The newly elected administration got to work mending ties with friendly nations throughout the globe.

In 1982, Romanian President Nicolae Ceausescu visited Indonesia.

Following the 1989 revolution that brought an end to communist rule in Romania, the presidents of both nations declared a desire to strengthen their collaboration in all areas, and this desire was realized through state visits. President Megawati Sukarnoputri, the president's daughter, traveled to Romania in April 2003. A year later, in February 2004, President Ion Iliescu made a return trip to Indonesia.

== Trade ==
The bilateral trade volume in 2012 was at US$172.67 million with balance in favour of Indonesia with export of US$106.41 million and import of US$66.25 million. Other than trade and economy, the bilateral relations includes culture, education, and technology.

== See also ==
- Foreign relations of Indonesia
- Foreign relations of Romania
