= Croatia–Indonesia relations =

- Croatia: Indonesia

Croatia and Indonesia established diplomatic relations on 2 September 1992. Croatia sees Indonesia as one of the largest and the most influential nations in ASEAN, and recognizes its potential as a gate to enter ASEAN markets. Vice versa, Indonesia also recognizes the Croatian potential as a strategic gate to penetrate the Balkans and European Union markets. Croatia has an embassy in Jakarta, while the Indonesian embassy in Zagreb was established in 2010.

== Trade ==
Croatia sought to access the ASEAN Economic Community in 2015 through its relations with Indonesia. On the other hand, Indonesia sees Croatia as a potential port to enter Balkans region as well as Central European Union market, especially since Croatia has joined the EU in July 2013. The bilateral trade volume in 2011 reached US$67.1 million and decreased in 2012 to US$30.17 million figures. On bilateral trade balance, Indonesia recorded a US$8.4 million surplus in 2012.

== Cooperation ==
Other than trade, cooperation also expanded to other sectors, including economics and technology, defense through the military industry cooperation, and education through the Indonesia-Croatia university cooperation.

== See also ==
- Foreign relations of Croatia
- Foreign relations of Indonesia
- Indonesia–Yugoslavia relations
- Yugoslavia and the Non-Aligned Movement
