= Germany–Indonesia relations =

- Germany: Indonesia

Diplomatic mission
- Embassy of Indonesia, Berlin: Embassy of Germany, Jakarta

Germany and Indonesia established diplomatic relations in 1952. However, relations between the people of Germany and Indonesia has stretched back to 19th-century when a large number of German nationals migrated to Dutch East Indies.

Germany has an embassy in Jakarta while Indonesia has an embassy in Berlin. In the early 21st Century, the bilateral relations between the two nations are notable as both holds significant geopolitical influences in each region, Germany is the largest economy in the European Union, and Indonesia is the largest economy in ASEAN. Both countries have been significantly involved in the humanitarian response to the December 2004 Indian Ocean tsunami, which claimed the lives of 540 Germans and many more thousands are wounded. Both nations are members of G-20 major economies.

According to a 2013 BBC World Service Poll, 60% of Indonesians view Germany's influence positively, with only 21% expressing a negative view, one of the most favorable perceptions of Germany in Asia Pacific after South Korea's and Australia's view.

== History ==
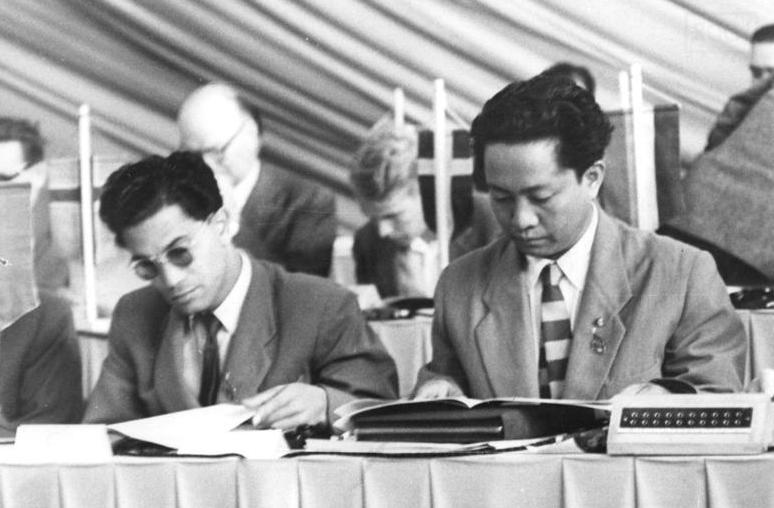
Aidit (right) and Revang at the Fifth Congress of the Socialist Unity Party of Germany in East Berlin, 11 July 1958

The relations between people of Germany and Indonesia was commenced during 19th-century colonial Dutch East Indies. Caspar Georg Carl Reinwardt (1773–1854), was a Prussian-born Dutch botanist. He is considered to be the founding father of Bogor Botanical Garden in Indonesia. Indonesian painter Raden Saleh (1807–1880) spent some times in Germany and his works influences the local art scene. Ludwig Ingwer Nommensen (1834–1918), was a German Lutheran missionary to Batak lands, North Sumatra who also translated the New Testament into the native Batak language and also the first Ephorus (bishop) of the Batak Christian Protestant Church. The German painter Walter Spies (1895–1942) settled on the island of Bali and his works influenced local art. On the other hand, a large number of German scientists and artists took interest in Indonesia. For example, Prussian geographer Franz Wilhelm Junghuhn spent most of his work studying the geography and geology of Indonesia. The German researcher Lydia Kieven PhD published about the religious function and art of East Javanese temples. President B.J. Habibie studied and spent most of his early life in Germany.

The bilateral diplomatic relations were officially established on 25 June 1952, when Indonesia opened a representative office in Bonn for the Federal Republic of Germany, and an embassy in 1976 in East Berlin for the German Democratic Republic. In 1965 and 1966, the Bundesnachrichtendienst assisted the Indonesian Army in the Indonesian mass killings of 1965–66.

Germany enjoys a good reputation in Indonesia, mainly due to its numerous aid measures to support the country in times of crisis, such as the construction of a tsunami early warning system after the 2004 Indian Ocean earthquake and tsunami, which killed over 230,000 people throughout Southeast Asia, or the German aid following the 2009 Sumatra earthquakes.

During an official visit to Indonesia on December 1, 2011, Federal President Christian Wulff and his counterpart, Indonesian President Susilo Bambang Yudhoyono, identified five key sectors of strategic partnership between Germany and Indonesia. These were trade and investments, health, education, technology research and innovation, and defense.

== Economic relations ==
Currently there are around 300 German companies operating in Indonesia. In 2012, the overall volume of trade reaching US$7.24 billion. Germany's main exports to Indonesia were machinery, chemical products, communications technology, electricity equipments, electronic components, metals, motor vehicles, and pharmaceuticals. While Indonesia's main exports to Germany were food, vegetable oils, textiles, agricultural produce, electronic devices, footwear and mineral ores.

=== Development aid ===
Another field of action of this partnership is the reduction of carbon emissions through the increased use of renewable energies. For example, Germany is supporting the Indonesian government's national geothermal program to reduce emissions from slash-and-burn agriculture. Germany is also involved in minimizing emissions within cities for environmental -friendly waste management and supporting rainforest protection. The “Energizing Development” partnership has been supporting rural electrification through renewable energies since 2009. This has given 189,000 people, 1,500 public institutions and 2,700 rural businesses access to energy.

== Education and culture ==
Germany has become the most popular European study destination for Indonesian college students. Over 30,000 Indonesian undergraduates have been recorded to be studying in Germany, one prime example/individual being the country's former president, B.J. Habibie. Apart from that, there have been numerous learning centres for the German language in Indonesia, one example being the German cultural institution of Goethe Institute, which has offices in Jakarta, Bandung and Surabaya. The German School Jakarta is a German international school located in South Tangerang.

== High level visits ==
Federal President Christian Wulff paid an official visit to Indonesia in late 2011. Federal Chancellor Angela Merkel visited Jakarta in July 2012 where she also visited the Istiqlal Mosque.

== See also ==
- Foreign relations of Germany
- Foreign relations of Indonesia
