= Czech Republic–Indonesia relations =

- Czech Republic: Indonesia

Diplomatic mission
- Czech Embassy, Jakarta: Indonesian Embassy, Prague

Czechoslovakia–Indonesia relations
- Czechoslovakia: Indonesia

The Czech Republic and the Republic of Indonesia established diplomatic relations in 1950. Both nations have agreed to forge ties to deepen relations, especially in the business and trade sector. Indonesia has an embassy in Prague, while the Czech Republic has an embassy in Jakarta that is also accredited to Brunei, Timor Leste and ASEAN.

== History ==
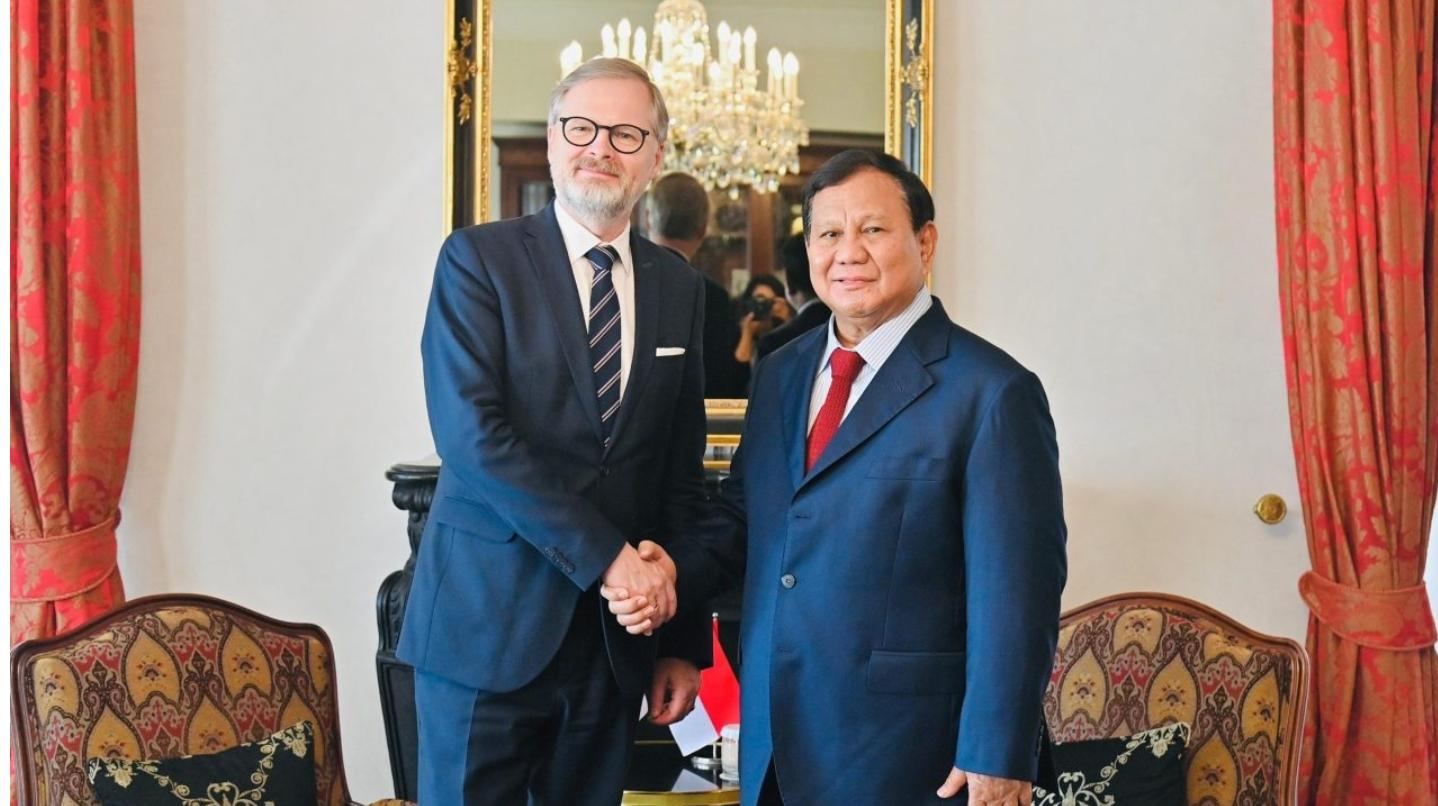
Czech Prime Minister Petr Fiala meeting with Indonesian President Prabowo Subianto.

Although the official diplomatic relations between Czechoslovakia and Indonesia was commenced on 2 February 1950, the historic relations established earlier when the Czechoslovak government opened honorary consulates in Batavia (now Jakarta), Dutch East Indies back in 1924. In 1948 Republic of Indonesia established "Indonesian Information Service" in Prague. Czechoslovakia recognized the sovereignty of Indonesia on February 2, 1950, followed by opening a general consulate on March 7, 1950, and upgraded its status to the embassy level in 1957.

Following the 1965 coup in Indonesia, a group of Indonesian communists lived in exile in Prague.

On 14 December 2022, Czech Prime Minister Petr Fiala held a bilateral meeting with Indonesian President Joko Widodo in Brussels. A number of topics were covered by the two leaders, including Indo-Pacific cooperation, strategic industrial collaboration, defense cooperation, and economic cooperation. As a follow-up, Fiala made a state visit to Indonesia in April 2023. Jokowi extended an invitation to the Czech Republic to invest in the Nusantara Capital, particularly in the area of mass transit that is more ecologically friendly.

== Trade and investment ==
In July 2012, the Czech Export Bank signed a memorandum of understanding with the Indonesia Exim Bank to finance cooperation in order to support export and import activities between two nation. In 2011, the total value of bilateral trade reached US$500 million. Czech imports from Indonesia consisted of textiles and garments, footwear, rubber and rubber products. On the other hand, Czech exports to Indonesia consisted mainly of machinery chemicals, textile, and power generation and telecommunications equipment.

During Indonesian President Prabowo Subianto's stopover on Prague, he and Fiala explored ways to develop mutually beneficial collaboration in investment and commerce.

== Diplomatic missions ==
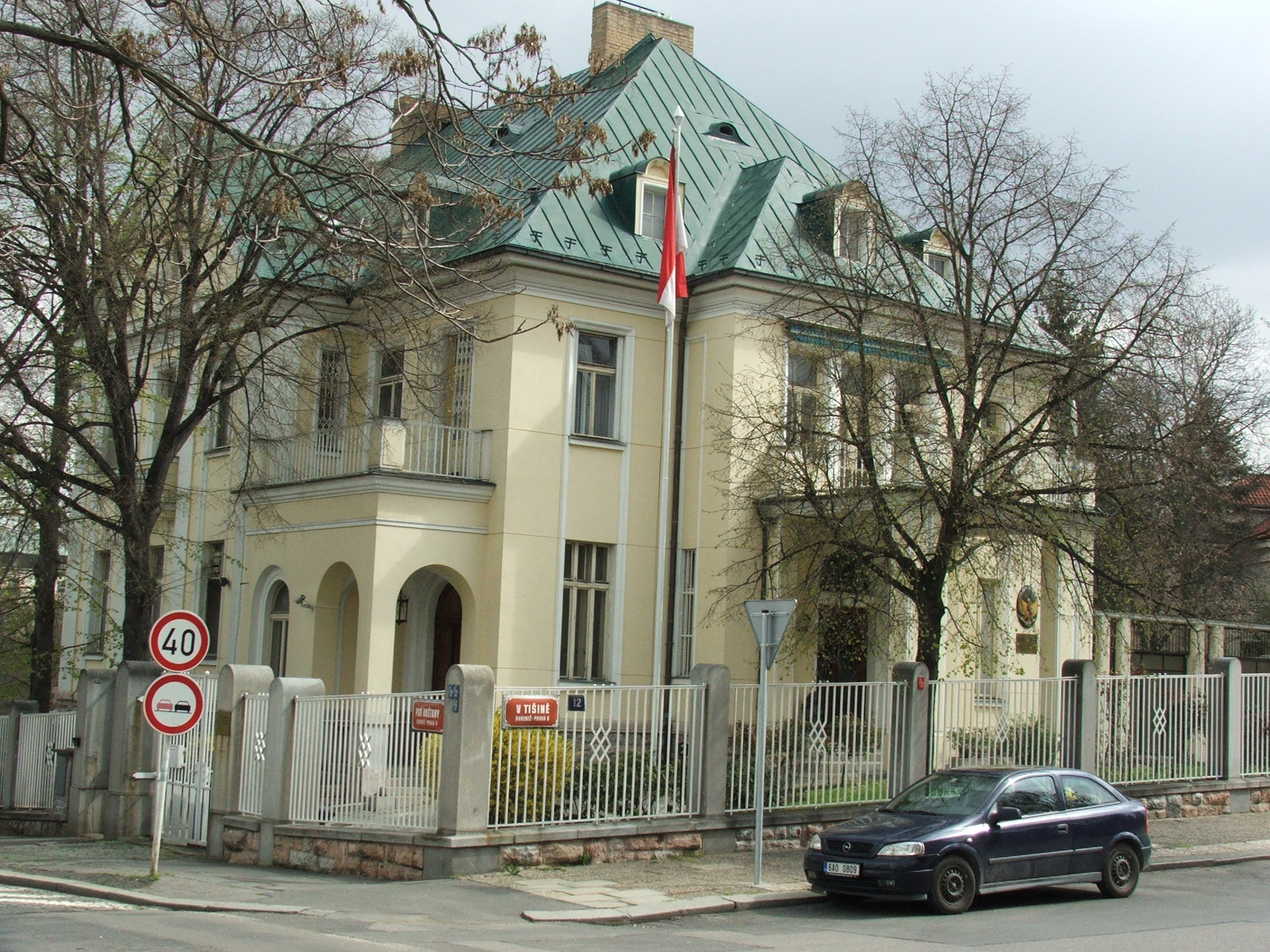
Residency of the Indonesian Embassy in Prague

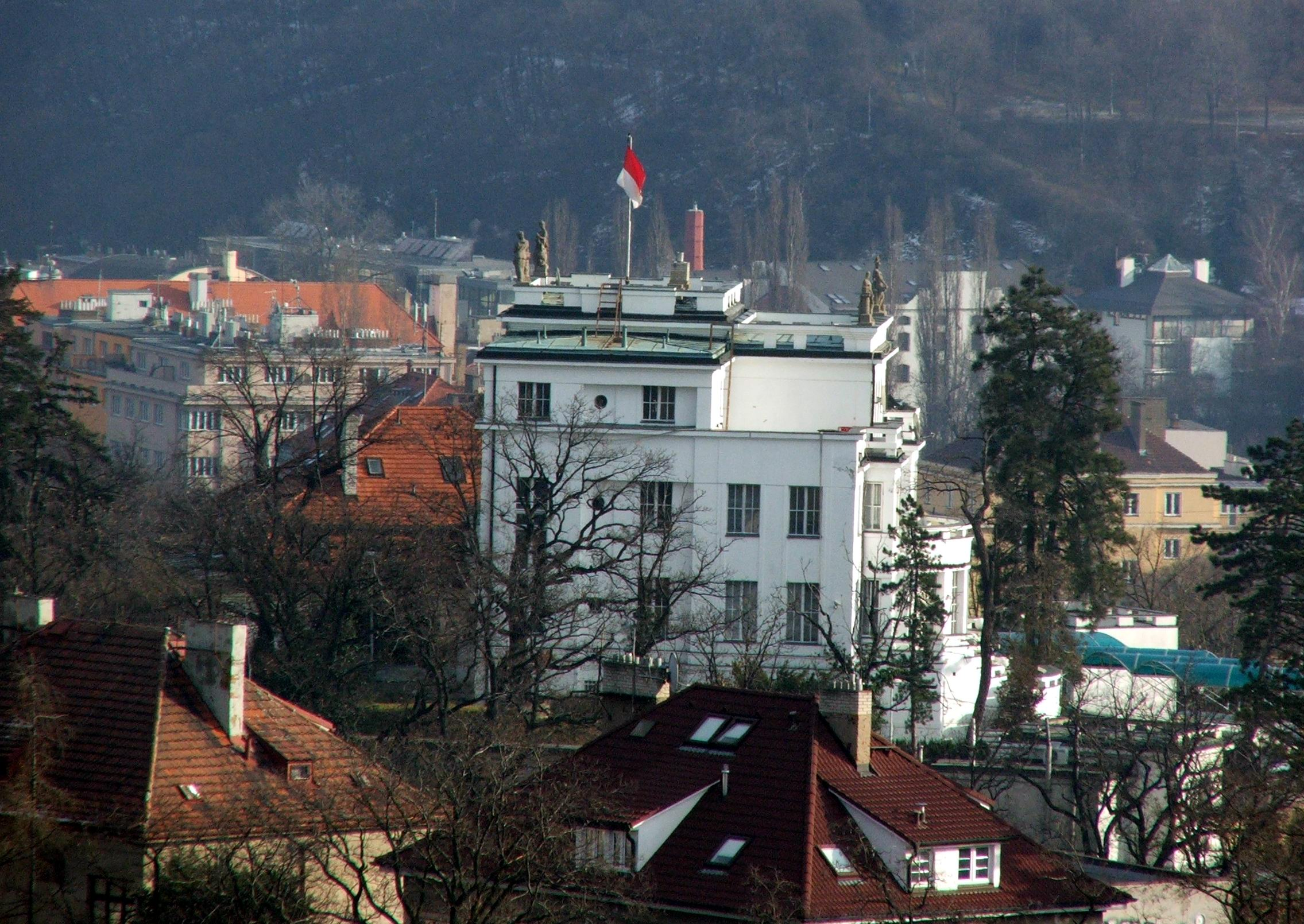
Indonesian Embassy in Prague

- Indonesia has an embassy in Prague
- The Czech Republic has an embassy in Jakarta that is also accredited to Brunei, Timor Leste and ASEAN.

== See also ==
- Foreign relations of the Czech Republic
- Foreign relations of Indonesia
