= Istiklal Mosque, Sarajevo =

Mosque in Sarajevo, Bosnia and Herzegovina

Istiklal Mosque
- Istiklal džamija

- Location of the mosque in Sarajevo

Religion
- Affiliation: Sunni Islam
- Ecclesiastical or organizational status: Mosque
- Status: Active

Location
- Location: Bulevar Meše Selimovića 85, Sarajevo 387 33
- Country: Bosnia and Herzegovina
- Interactive map of Istiklal Mosque
- Coordinates: 43°50′47″N 18°21′39″E

Architecture
- Architect: Achmad Noe'man
- Type: Mosque
- Style: Postmodern
- Funded by: Government of Indonesia
- Completed: 2001
- Construction cost: US$2.7 million

Specifications
- Interior area: 2,500 m^{2} (27,000 sq ft)
- Dome: 1
- Dome height (outer): 27 m (89 ft)
- Dome dia. (outer): 27 m (89 ft)
- Minaret: 2
- Minaret height: 48 m (157 ft)
- Materials: Stainless steel; aluminium; glass; tiles; timber

The Istiklal Mosque (Bosnian: Istiklal džamija) is a large mosque in Sarajevo, the capital of Bosnia and Herzegovina. It was named after Istiqlal Mosque, the national mosque of Indonesia, that is located in Jakarta. The mosque was a gift from the Indonesian people and Government of Indonesia for Bosnia and Herzegovina as a token of solidarity and friendship between the two nations. The name "Istiklal" is Arabic for 'independence', thus it is also meant to commemorate the independence of Bosnia and Herzegovina.

== Activities ==
Other than its regular function as a house of prayers; the regular daily five-times salat and other prayers (Jumu'ah and Eids), Istiqlal mosque also hosts maktab and Quran recital competitions for children and adults. The mosque also served as Project Bureau Center for Islamic Architecture, arranging Islamic weddings, and also as Indonesian Cultural Center.

== History ==
During his visit to the war torn city of Sarajevo in March 1995 and a courtesy call to Bosnian President Alija Izetbegović, Indonesian President Suharto contemplated an idea to build a mosque in the city as a gift for the people of Bosnia and Herzegovina. Suharto mobilized his administrations to realize his idea, and appointed Fauzan Noe’man, one of Indonesia's foremost architect to design the mosque and proceed with the project. Noe'man was known for his works in constructing grand mosque of Batam, Baiturrahim mosque in Merdeka Palace complex, and also At-Tin mosque (1999) in East Jakarta near Taman Mini Indonesia Indah. The project is started in 1995, however because of the turmoil in Indonesia that led to Suharto's presidency ending in 1998, the construction process was stalled.

The mosque was completed and inaugurated in September 2001 by Indonesian Minister of Religious Affairs, Said Agil Al Munawar. A year later in September 2002 during her stately visit to Sarajevo, President Megawati Soekarnoputri also visited the mosque.

== Architecture ==
The Istiqlal Mosque of Sarajevo demonstrates postmodern interpretation of Islamic architecture as viewed from Indonesian perspective. The mosque built with simple geometric elements and patterns on metal-works made from stainless steel or aluminium and glass blocks applied on facade, windows and arches. The exterior were covered with white tiles, while the interior, especially in mihrab, minbar and window frames were adorned with Indonesian wooden carving of floral ornaments.

Built on 2,800 square metres (30,000 sq ft) on Otoka on western side of the city, the mosque is one among the largest mosque in Sarajevo and easily recognizable as the landmark in the neighbourhood. The mosque has a single copper-colored dome measured 27 metres (89 ft) hight and 27 metres (89 ft) in diameter. The dome is equipped with three horizontal openings around the dome to allow natural lights to enter the mosque's interior beneath the dome. This type of dome is similar to those of At-Tin mosque in Jakarta, also designed by Fauzan Noe’man. Two twin minarets flanking the entrance with reminiscent of Iranian iwan facade style, that are 48 metres (157 ft) high. The tip of the dome and twin minarets are adorned with three spherical pinnacles with star and crescent on top of it. The twin minarets symbolize two nations, as the mosque represents the friendship and solidarity between Indonesia and Bosnia and Herzegovina.

== See also ==
- Islam in Bosnia and Herzegovina
- List of mosques in Bosnia and Herzegovina
- Bosnia and Herzegovina–Indonesia relations
