= List of diplomatic missions of Indonesia =

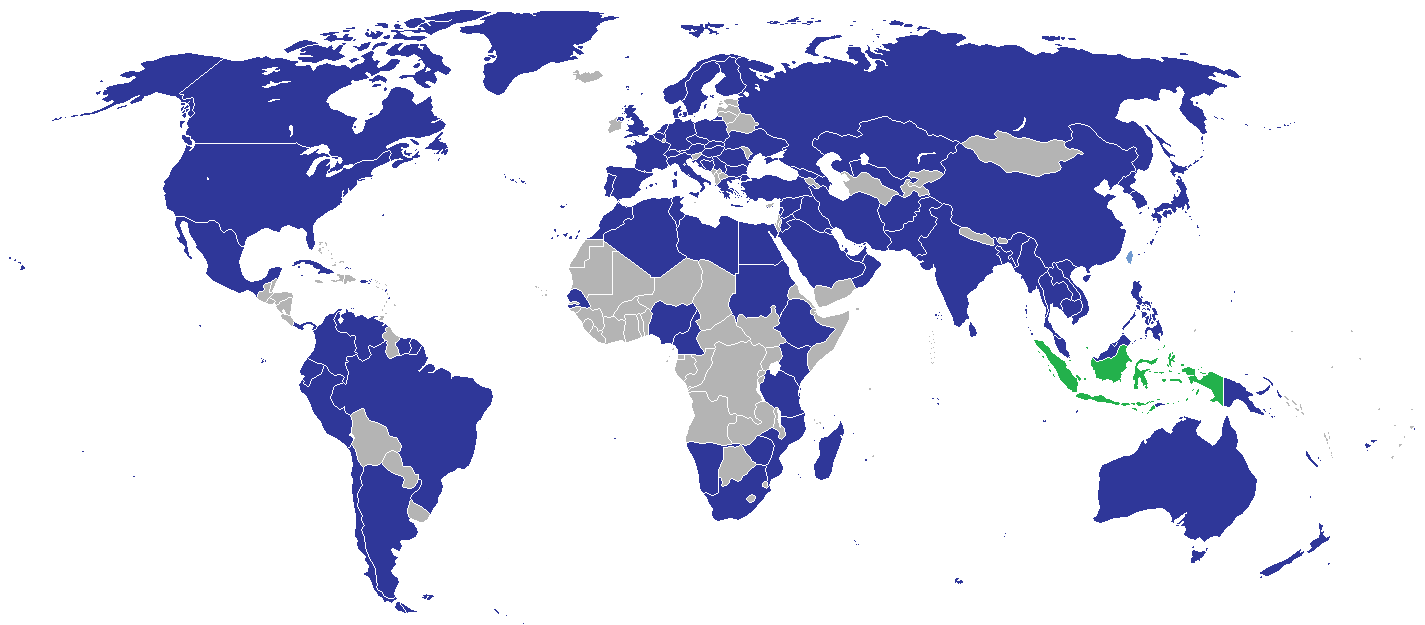
Map of Indonesian diplomatic missions

The Republic of Indonesia, the world's fourth most populous country, holds significant diplomatic weight in Southeast Asia (as the seat of the Association of Southeast Asian Nations), the Non-Aligned Movement, and within the Islamic world as the most populous Muslim majority country. As such, it possesses a vast network of embassies, consulates, and permanent missions to international organizations.

Excluded from this listing are honorary consulates and trade missions, with the exception of the economic and trade office in Taipei, which serves as its de facto embassy to Taiwan.

== Current missions ==
=== Africa ===
Host country	Host city	Mission	Concurrent accreditation	Ref.
Algeria	Algiers	Embassy		
Cameroon	Yaoundé	Embassy	Countries: Central African Republic; Chad; Congo-Brazzaville; Equatorial Guinea; Gabon	
Egypt	Cairo	Embassy		
Ethiopia	Addis Ababa	Embassy	Countries: Djibouti; Eritrea; Multilateral Organizations: African Union (Note: Accredited as an observer mission.)	
Kenya	Nairobi	Embassy	Countries: Congo-Kinshasa; Somalia; South Sudan; Uganda; Multilateral Organizations: UNEP; UN-Habitat	
Libya	Tripoli	Embassy		
Madagascar	Antananarivo	Embassy	Countries: Comoros; Mauritius; Seychelles	
Morocco	Rabat	Embassy	Countries: Mauritania	
Mozambique	Maputo	Embassy	Countries: Malawi	
Namibia	Windhoek	Embassy	Countries: Angola	
Nigeria	Abuja	Embassy	Countries: Benin; Burkina Faso; Ghana; Liberia; Niger; São Tomé and Príncipe; Togo; Multilateral Organizations: Economic Community of West African States	
Senegal	Dakar	Embassy	Countries: Cape Verde; Gambia; Guinea; Guinea-Bissau; Ivory Coast; Mali; Sierra Leone	
South Africa	Pretoria	Embassy	Countries: Botswana; Eswatini; Lesotho; Multilateral Organizations: Southern African Development Community	
South Africa	Cape Town	Consulate-General	Countries: Botswana; Eswatini; Lesotho; Multilateral Organizations: Southern African Development Community	
Sudan	Port Sudan (Note: Originally in Khartoum, was relocated to Port Sudan as a result of the ongoing civil war.)	Embassy		
Tanzania	Dar es Salaam	Embassy	Countries: Burundi; Rwanda; Multilateral Organizations: East African Community	
Tunisia	Tunis	Embassy		
Zimbabwe	Harare	Embassy	Countries: Zambia	

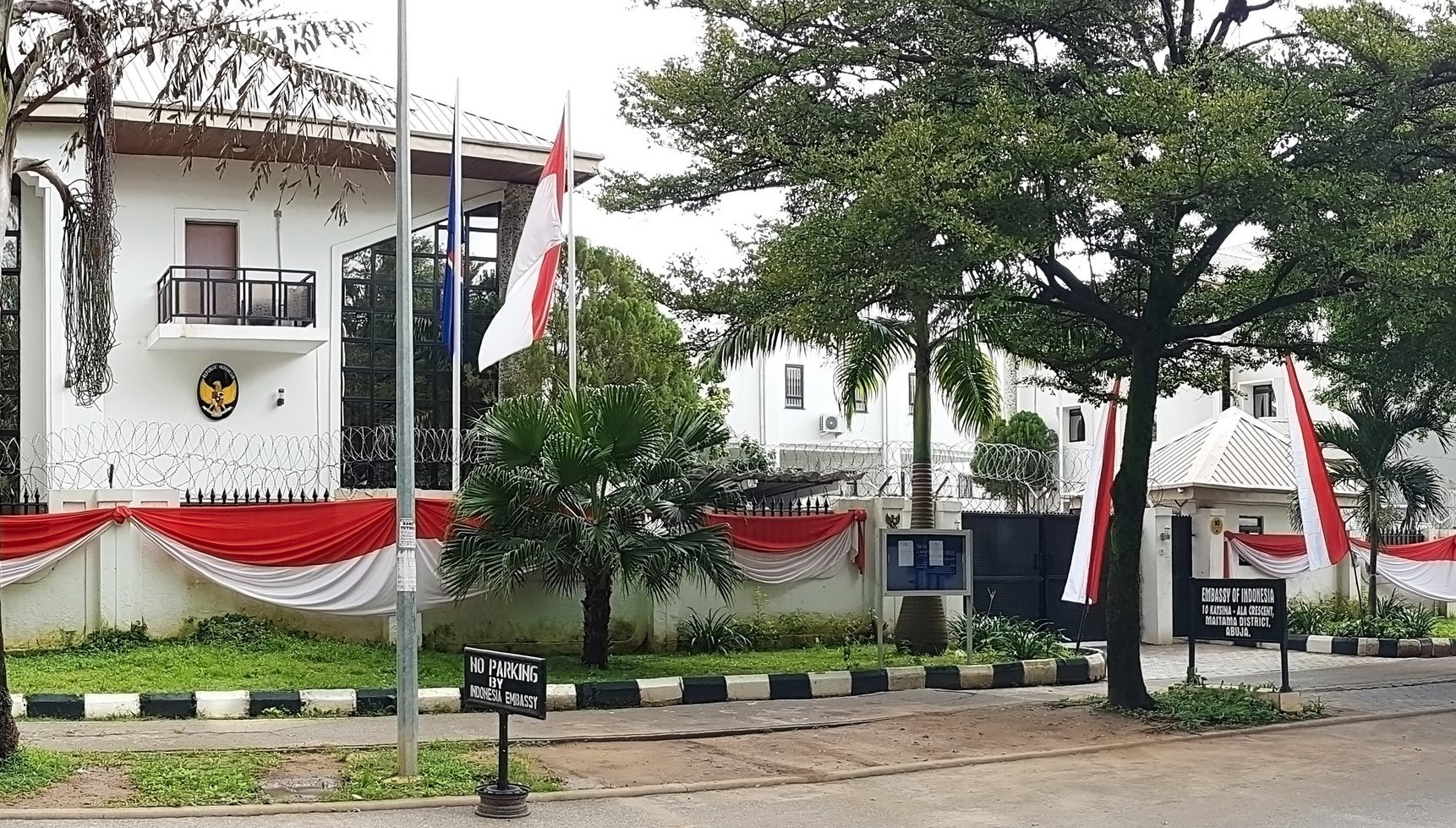
Embassy in Abuja

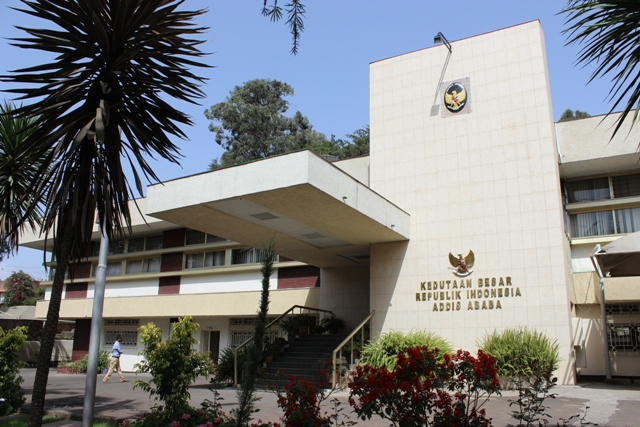
Embassy in Addis Ababa

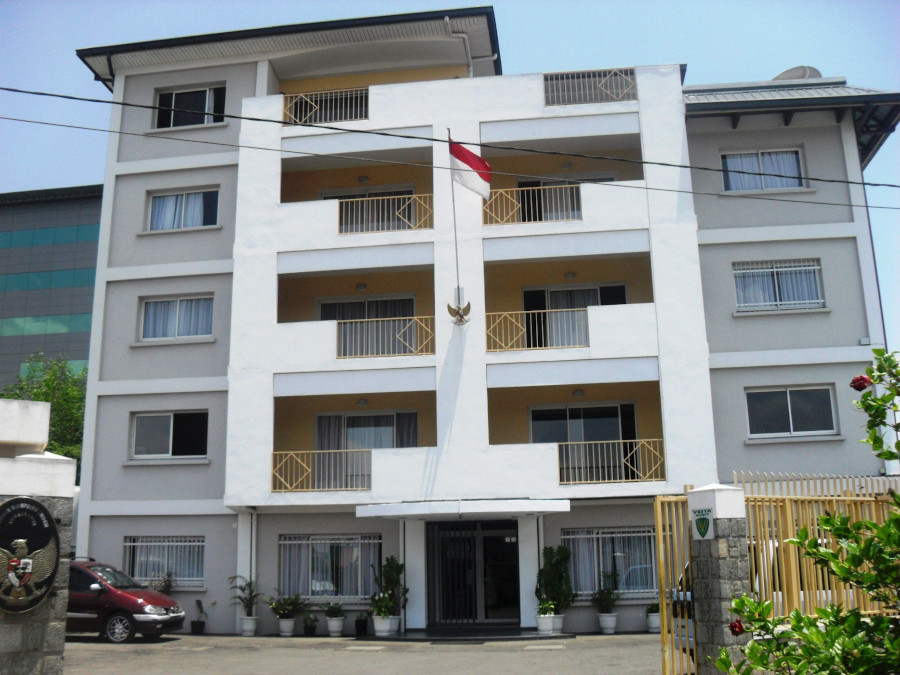
Embassy in Antananarivo

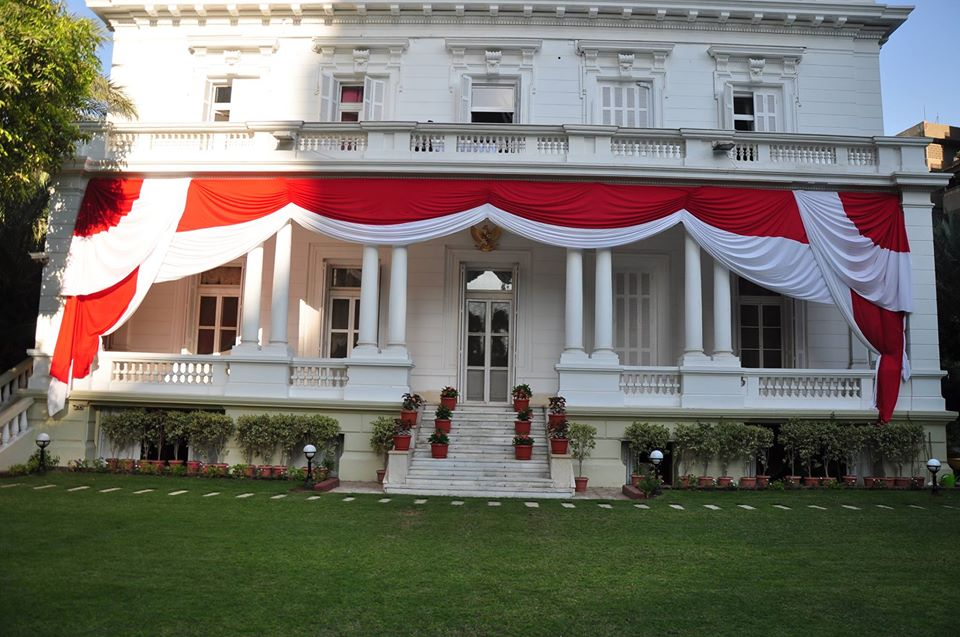
Embassy in Cairo

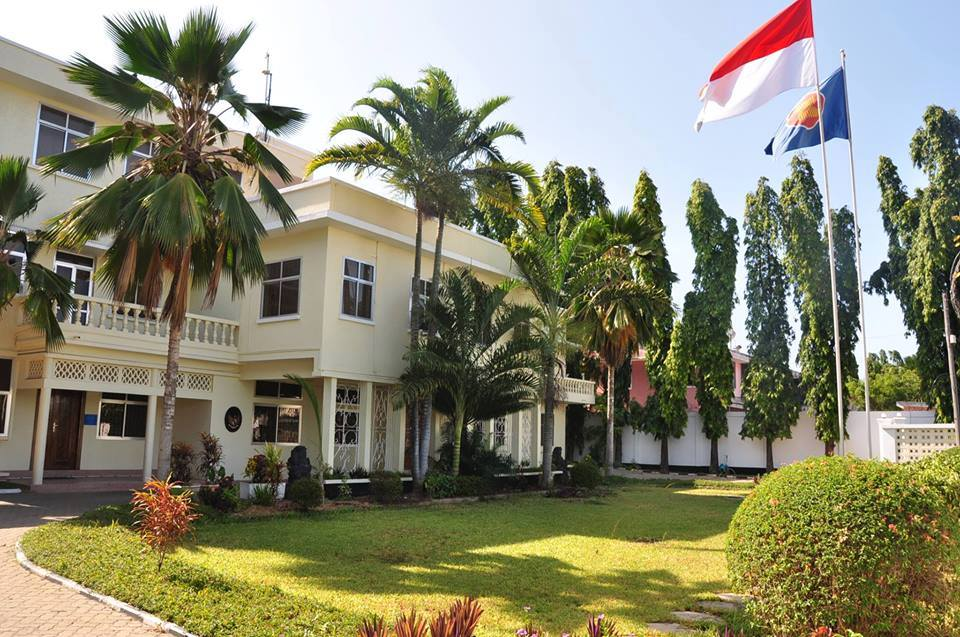
Embassy in Dar es Salaam

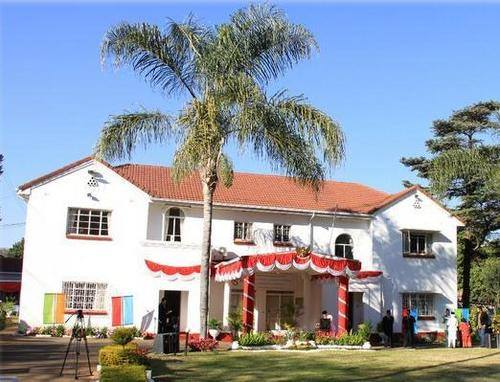
Embassy in Harare

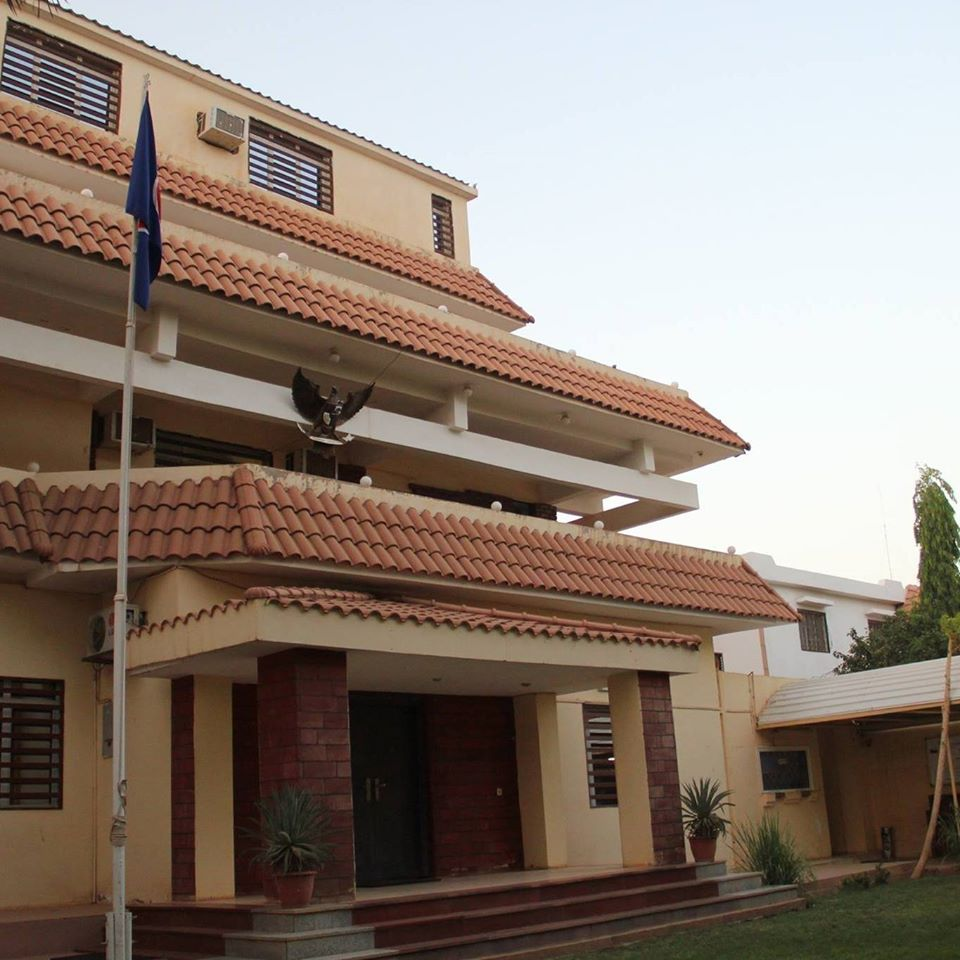
Embassy in Khartoum

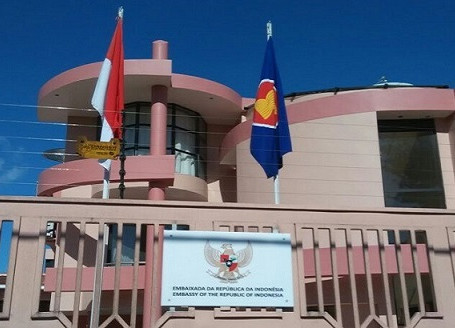
Embassy in Maputo

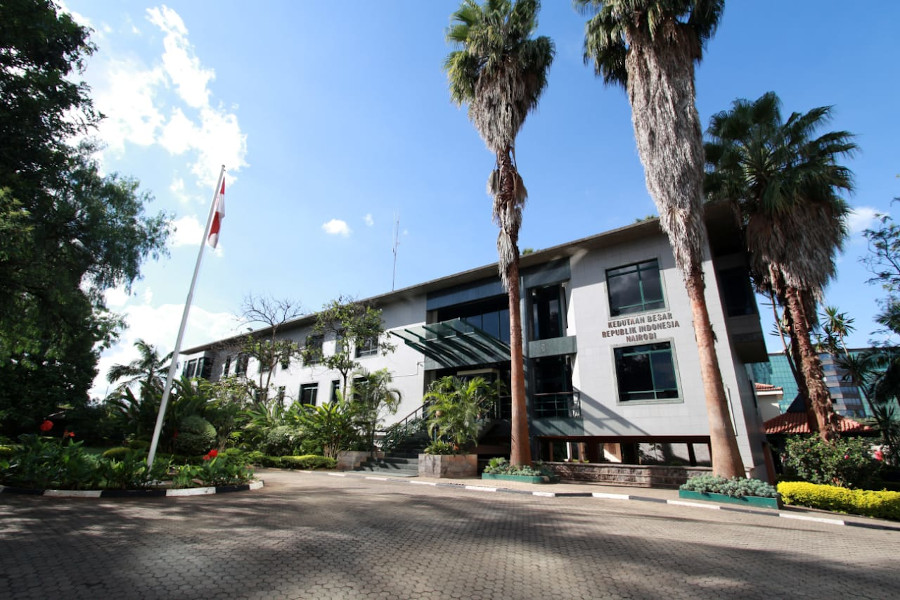
Embassy in Nairobi

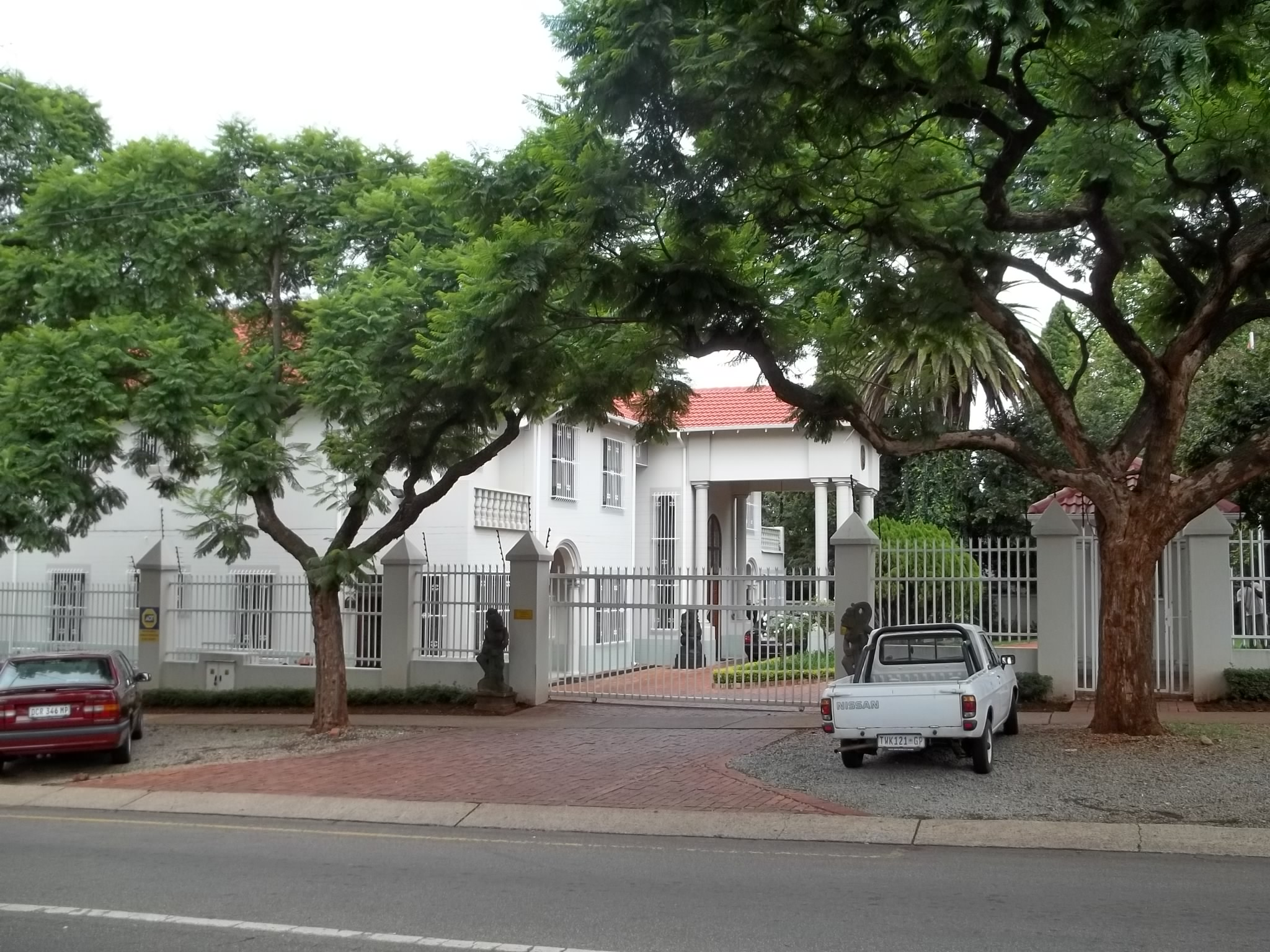
Embassy in Pretoria

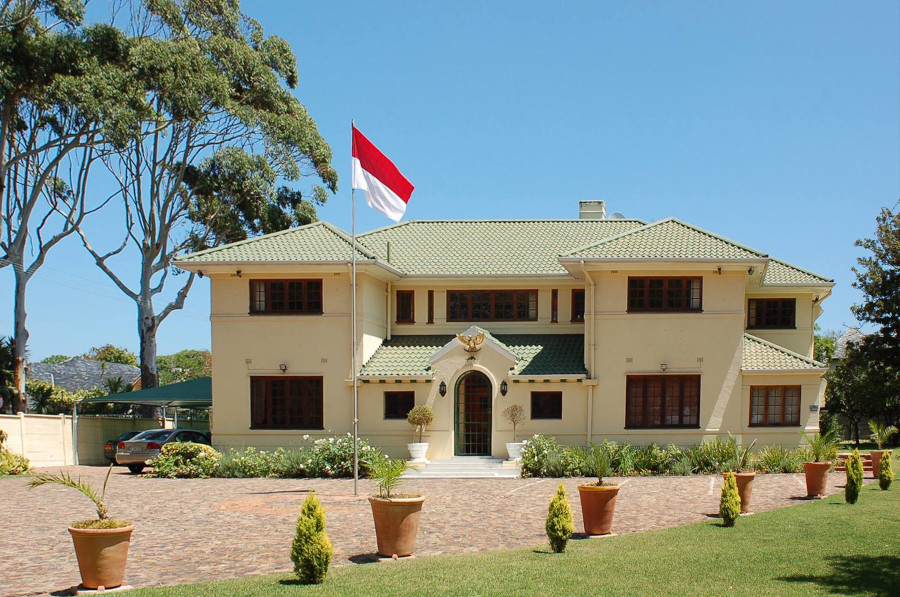
Consulate-General in Cape Town

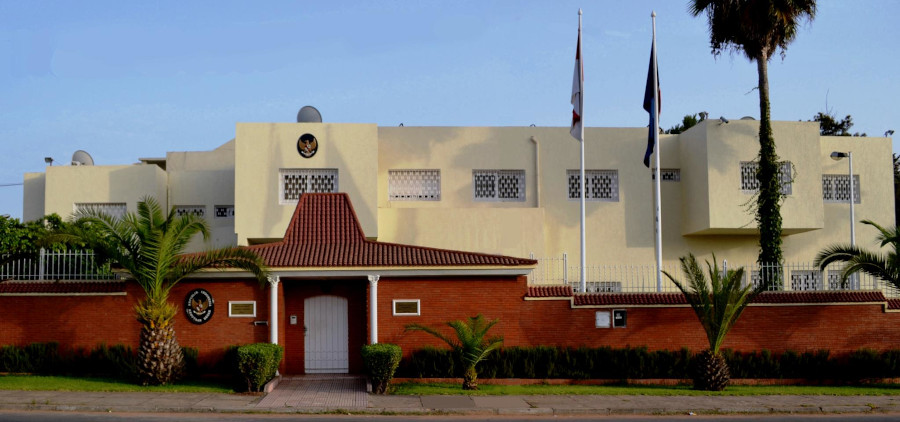
Embassy in Rabat

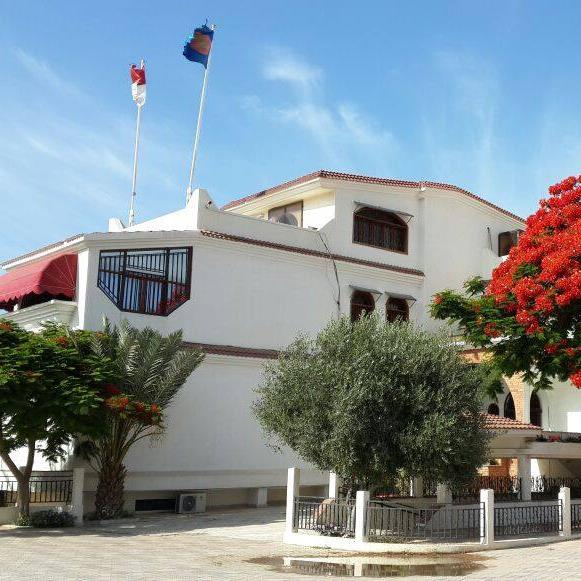
Embassy in Tripoli

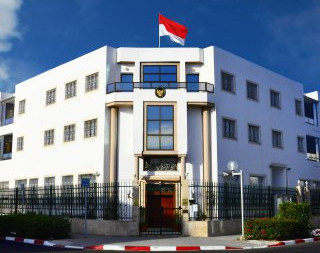
Embassy in Tunis

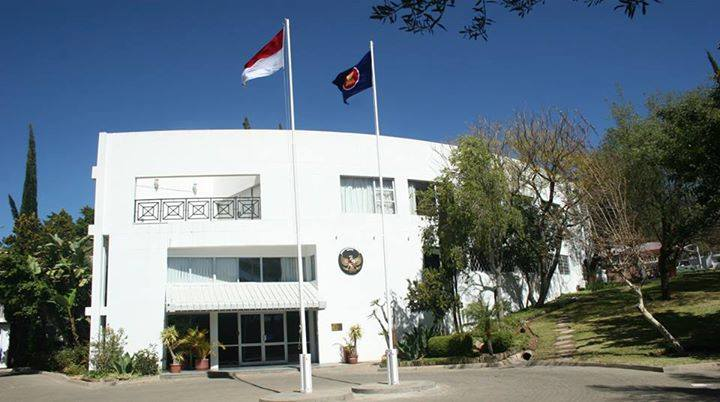
Embassy in Windhoek

=== Americas ===
Host country	Host city	Mission	Concurrent accreditation	Ref.
Argentina	Buenos Aires	Embassy	Countries: Paraguay; Uruguay	
Brazil	Brasília	Embassy		
Canada	Ottawa	Embassy	Multilateral Organizations: International Civil Aviation Organization	
Canada	Toronto	Consulate-General	Multilateral Organizations: International Civil Aviation Organization	
Canada	Vancouver	Consulate-General	Multilateral Organizations: International Civil Aviation Organization	
Chile	Santiago de Chile	Embassy		
Colombia	Bogotá	Embassy	Countries: Antigua and Barbuda; Barbados; Saint Kitts and Nevis	
Cuba	Havana	Embassy	Countries: Bahamas; Dominican Republic; Haiti; Jamaica	
Ecuador	Quito	Embassy		
Mexico	Mexico City	Embassy	Countries: Belize; El Salvador; Guatemala	
Panama	Panama City	Embassy	Countries: Costa Rica; Honduras; Nicaragua	
Peru	Lima	Embassy	Countries: Bolivia	
Suriname	Paramaribo	Embassy	Countries: Guyana; Multilateral Organizations: Caribbean Community	
United States	Washington, D.C.	Embassy		
United States	Chicago	Consulate-General		
United States	Houston	Consulate-General		
United States	Los Angeles	Consulate-General		
United States	New York City	Consulate-General		
United States	San Francisco	Consulate-General		
Venezuela	Caracas	Embassy	Countries: Dominica; Grenada; Saint Lucia; Saint Vincent and the Grenadines; Trinidad and Tobago	

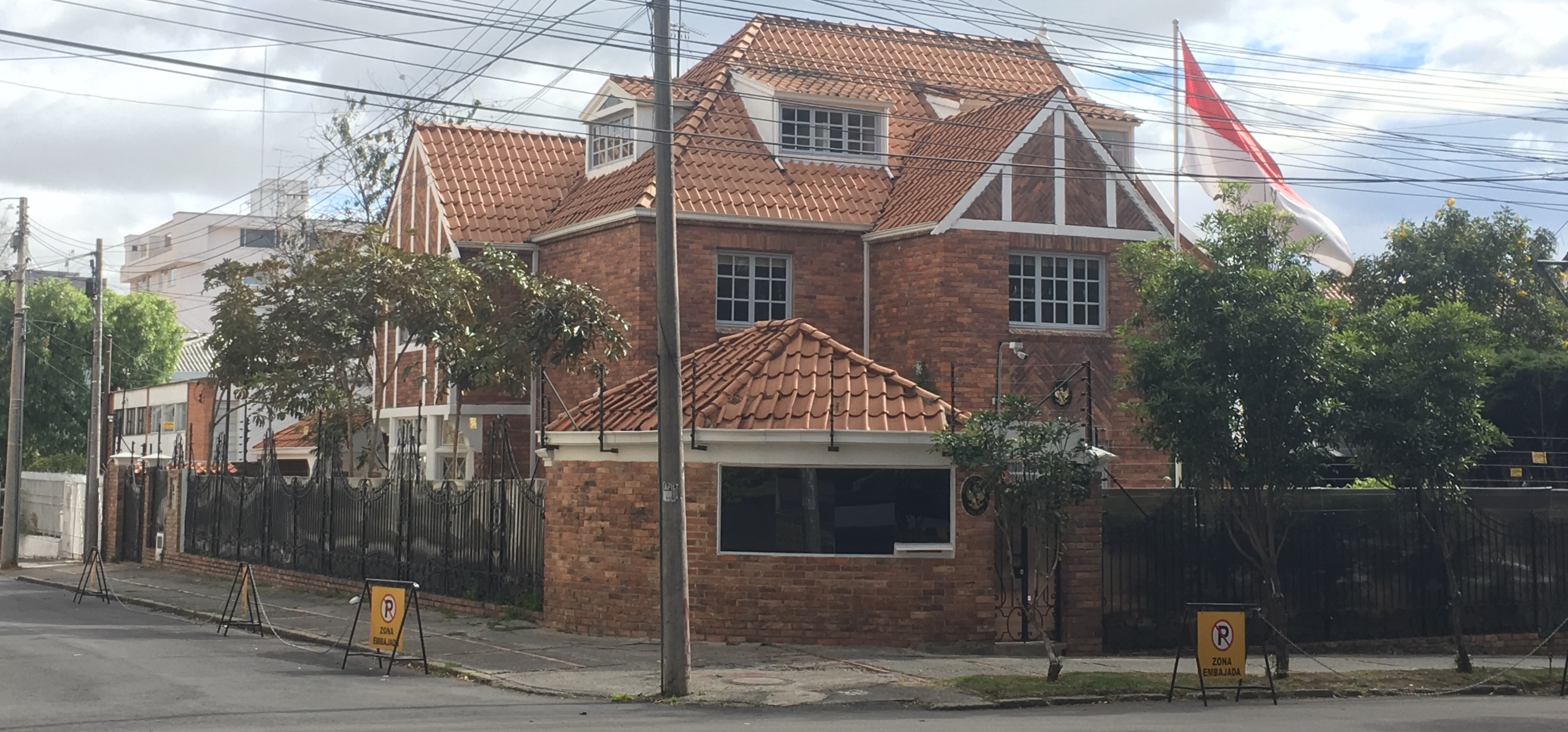
Embassy in Bogotá

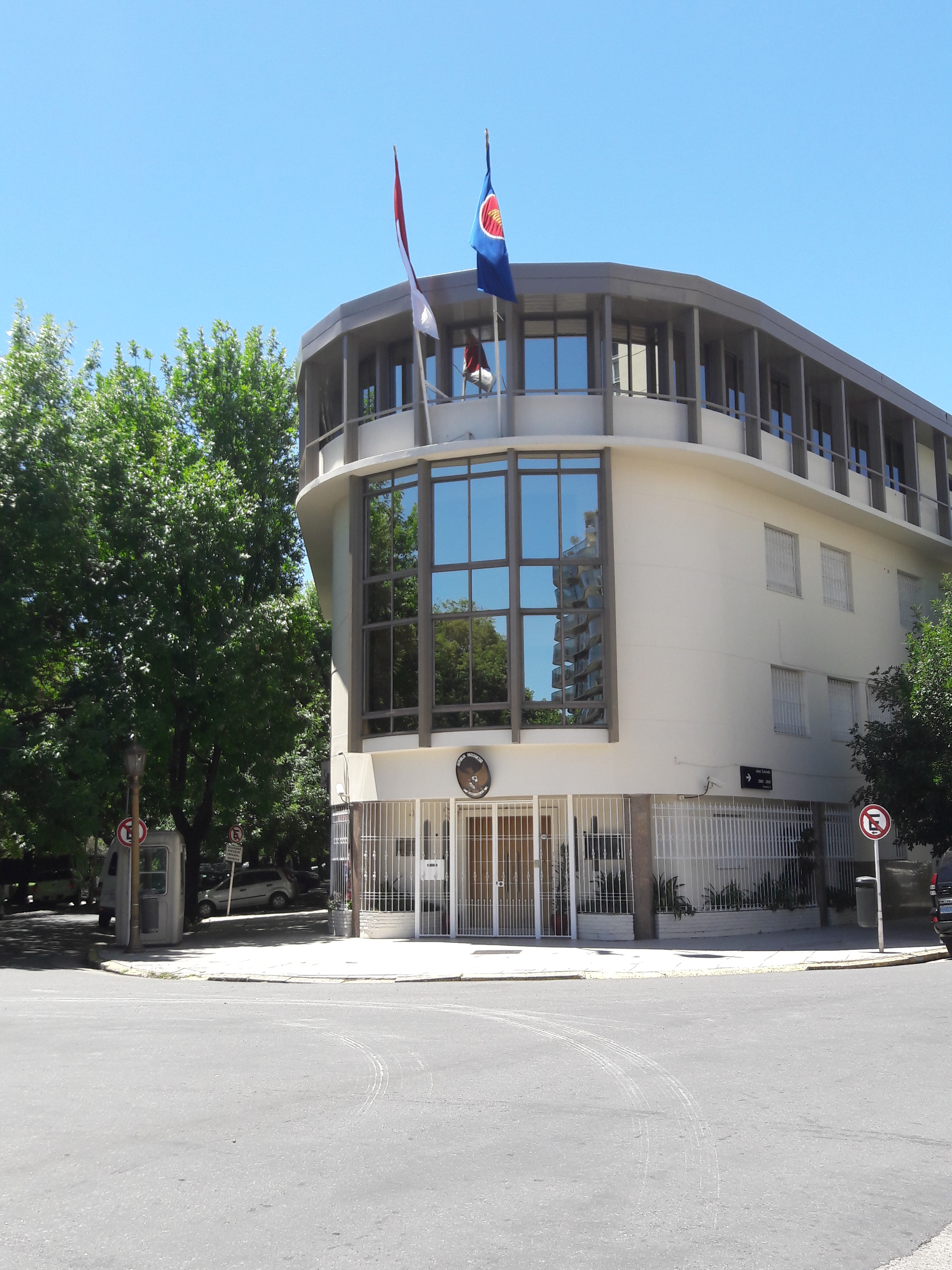
Embassy in Buenos Aires

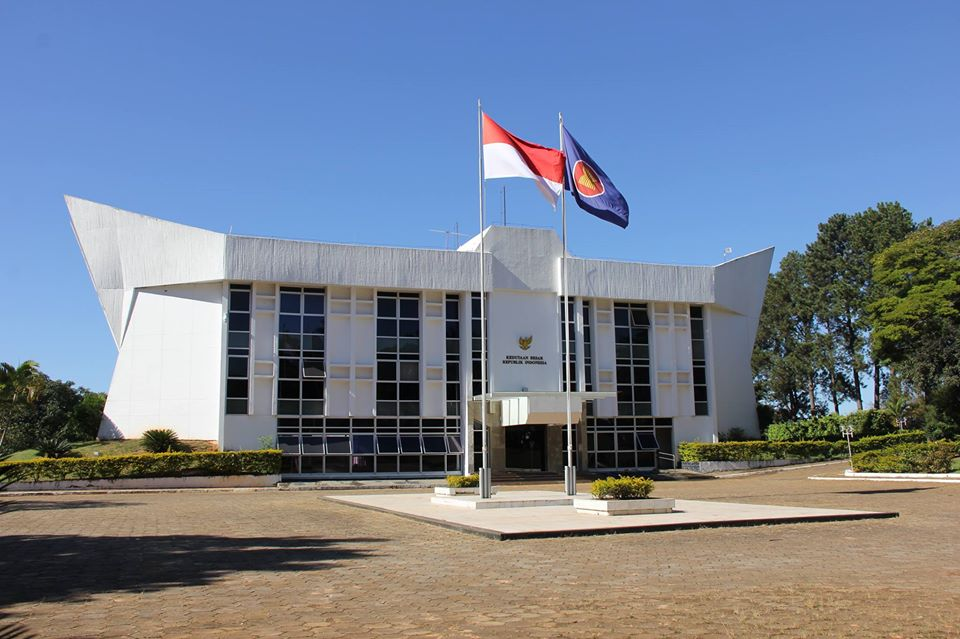
Embassy in Brasília

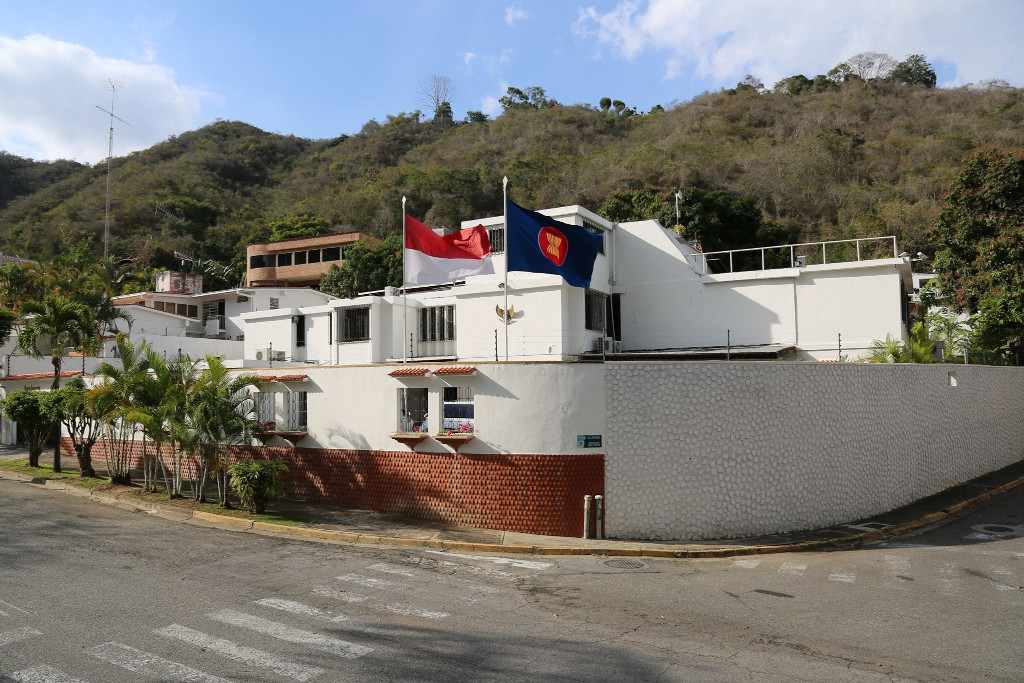
Embassy in Caracas

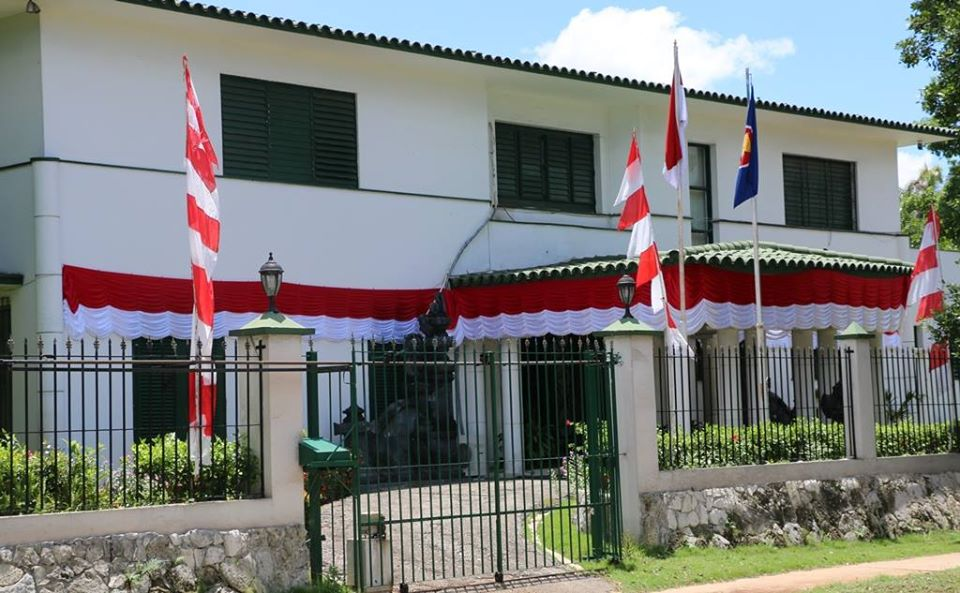
Embassy in Havana

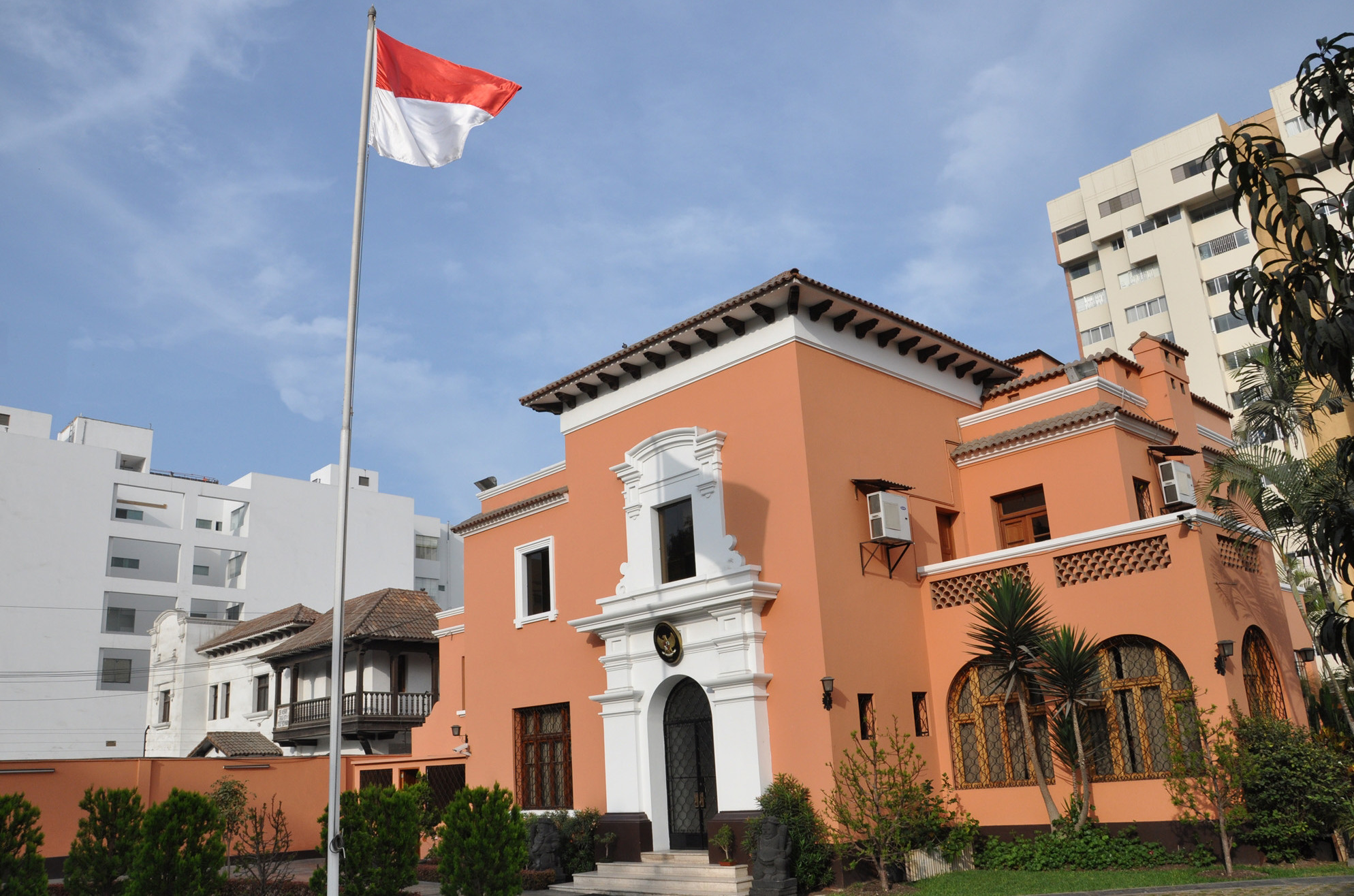
Embassy in Lima

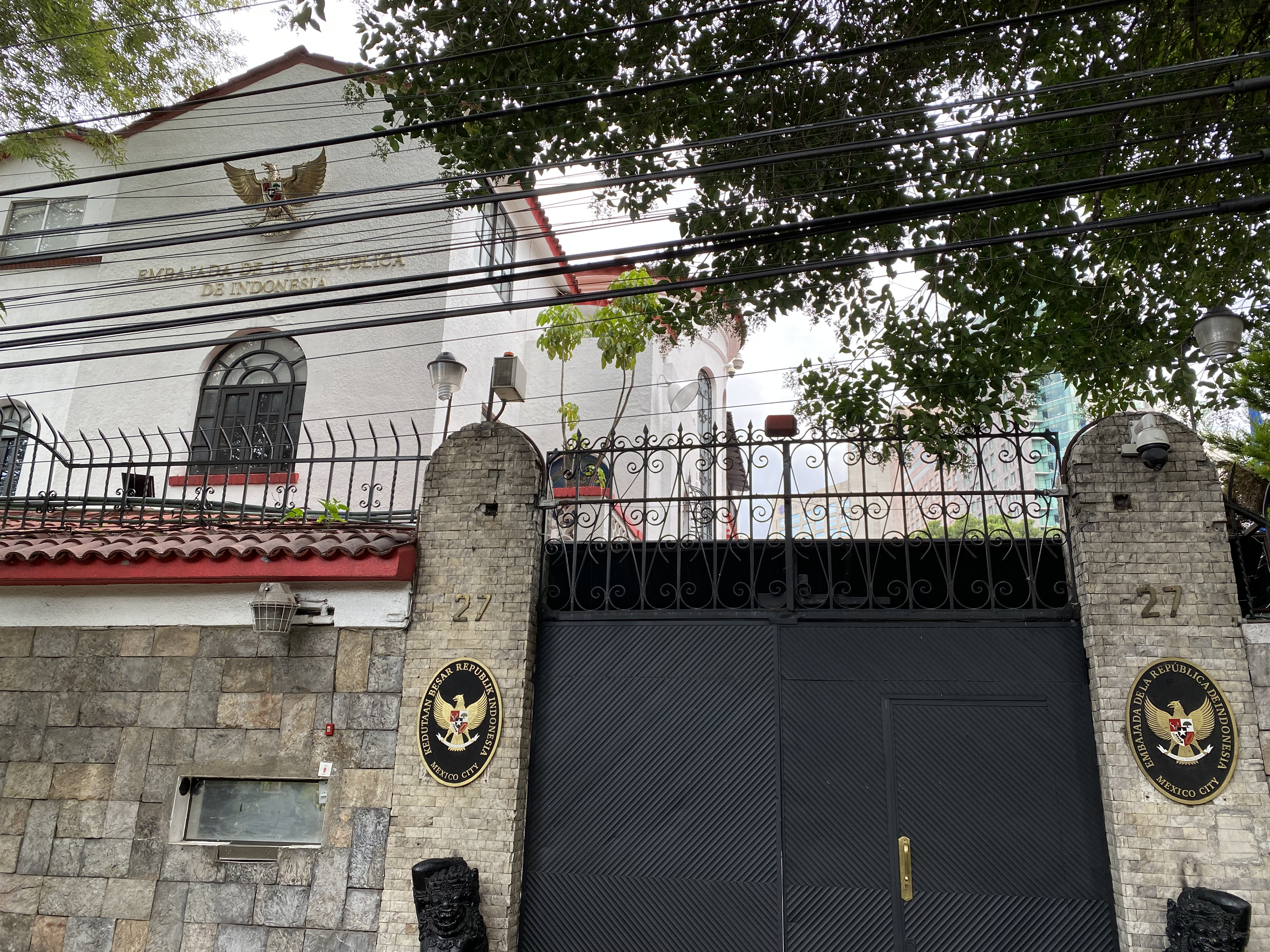
Embassy in Mexico City

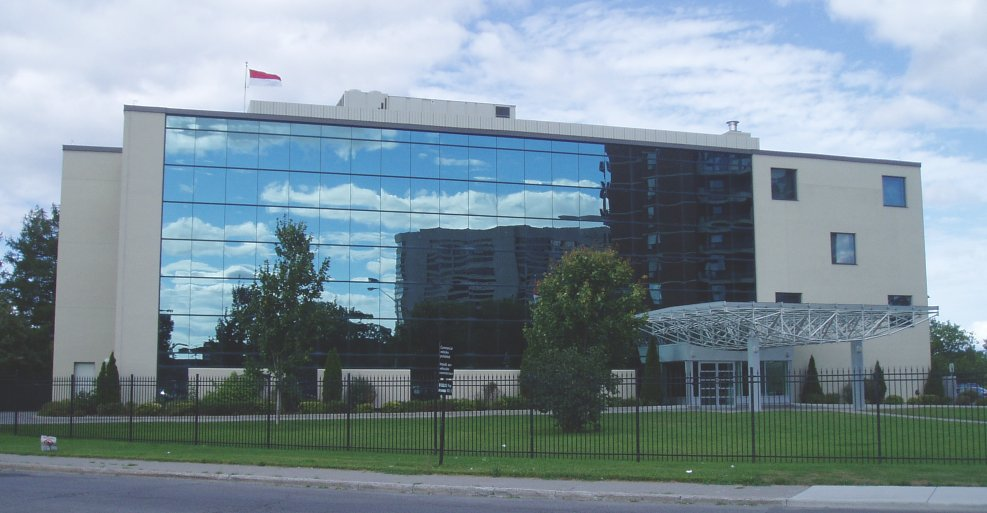
Embassy in Ottawa

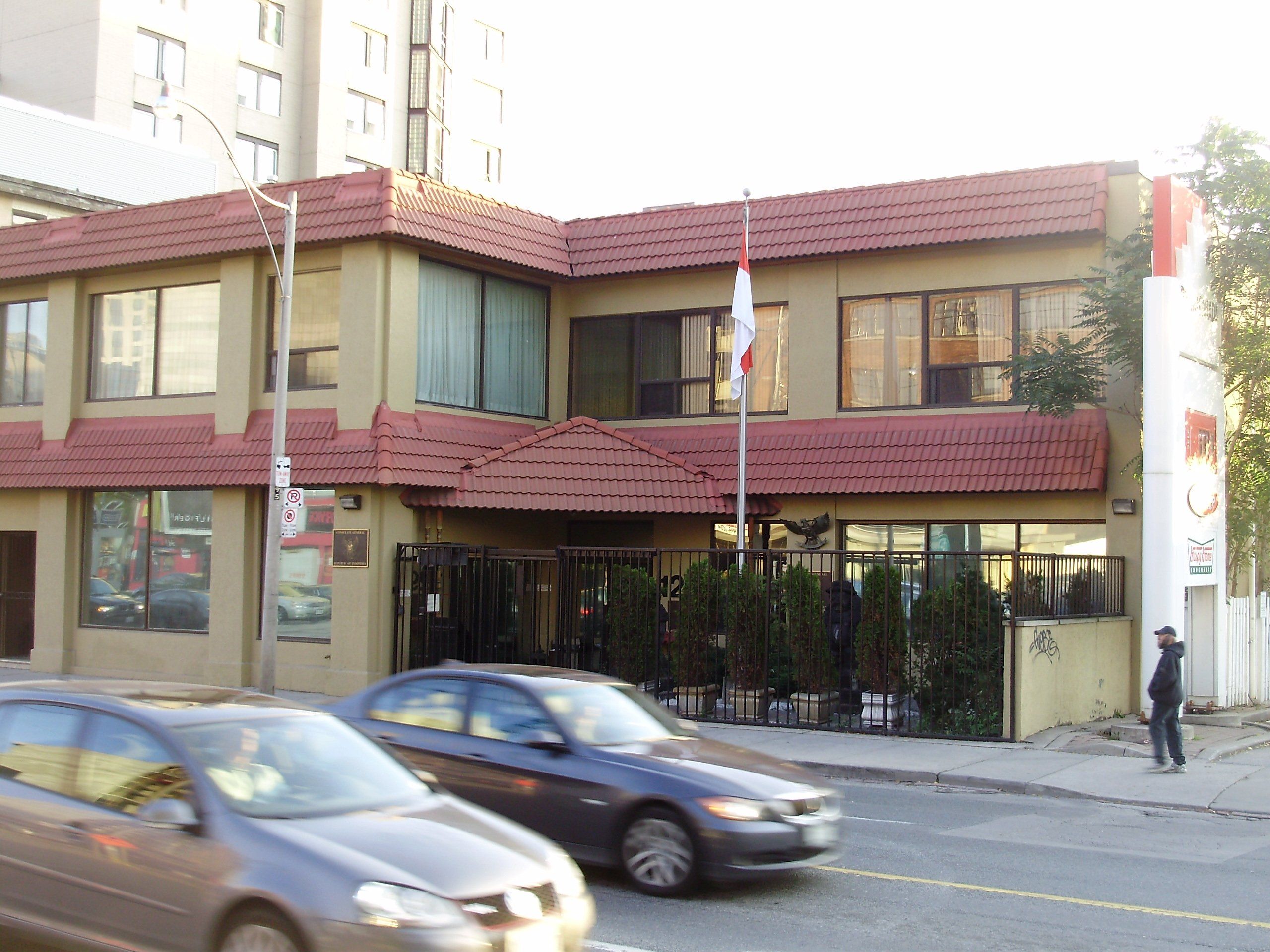
Consulate-General in Toronto

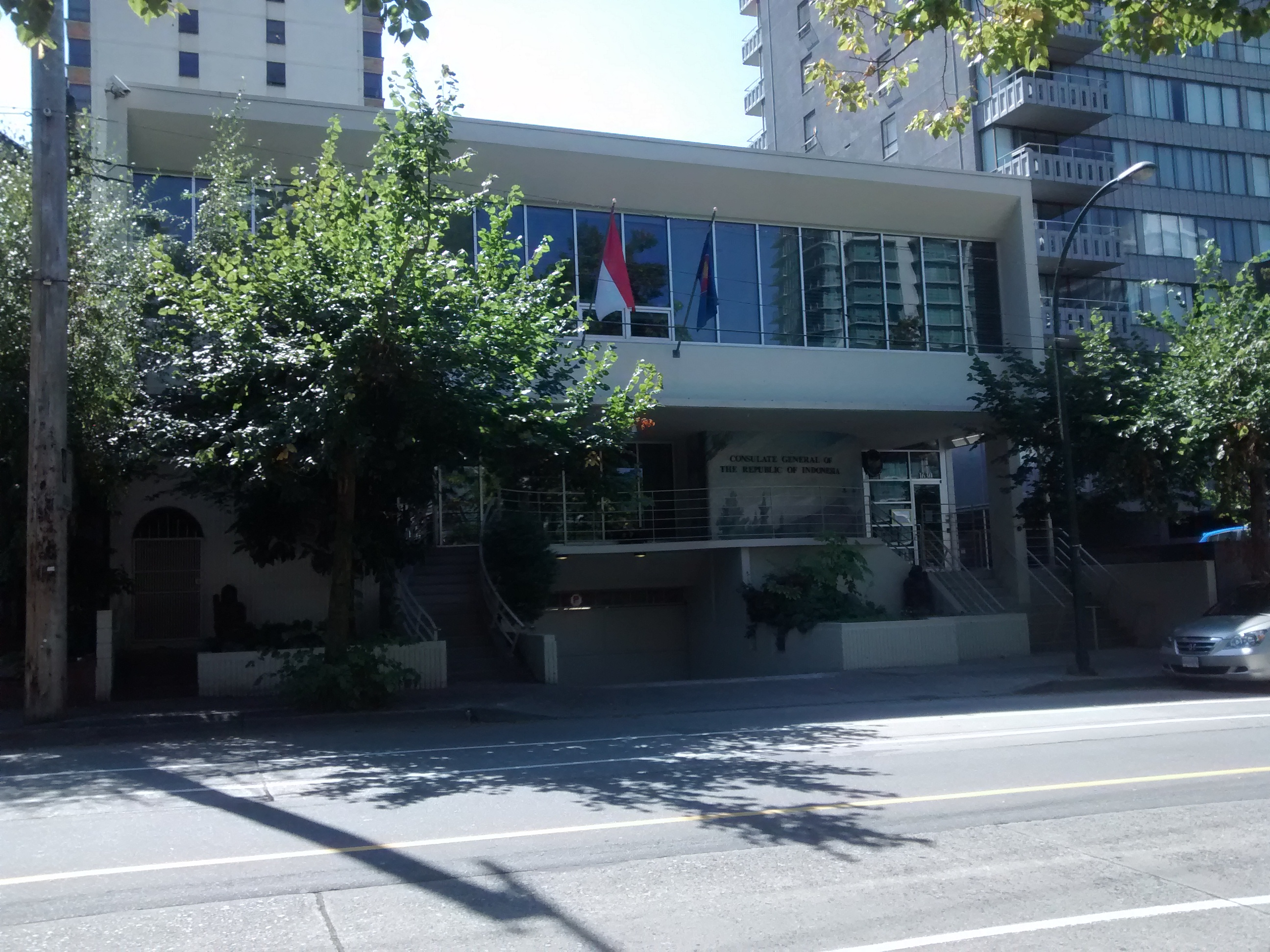
Consulate-General in Vancouver

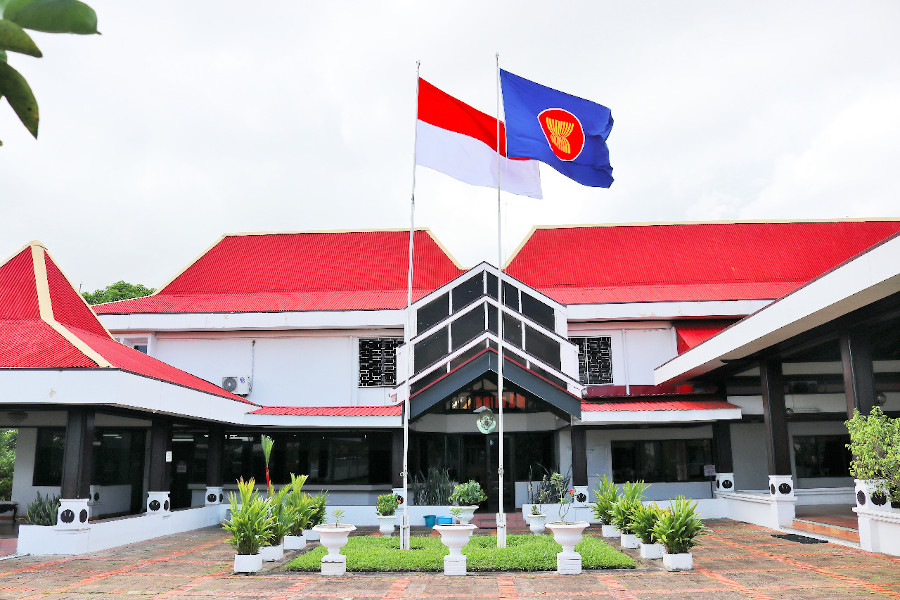
Embassy in Paramaribo

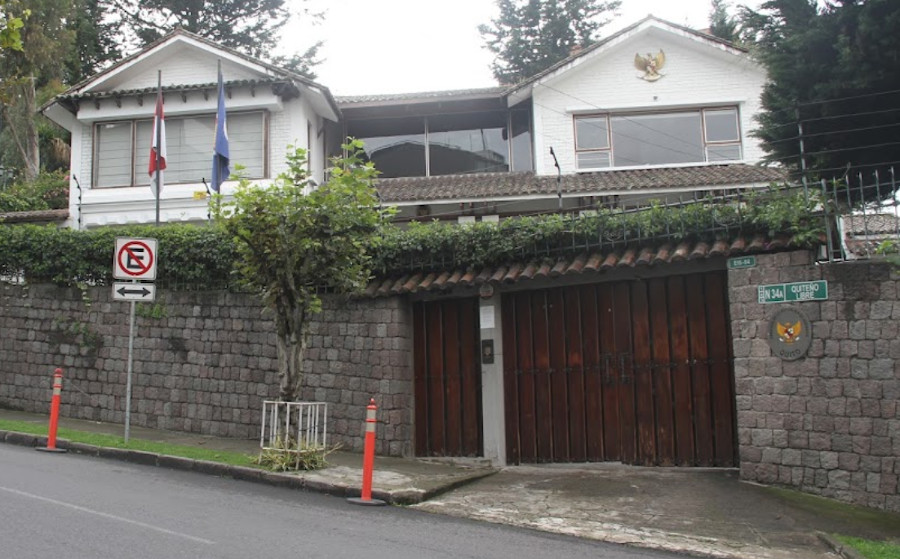
Embassy in Quito

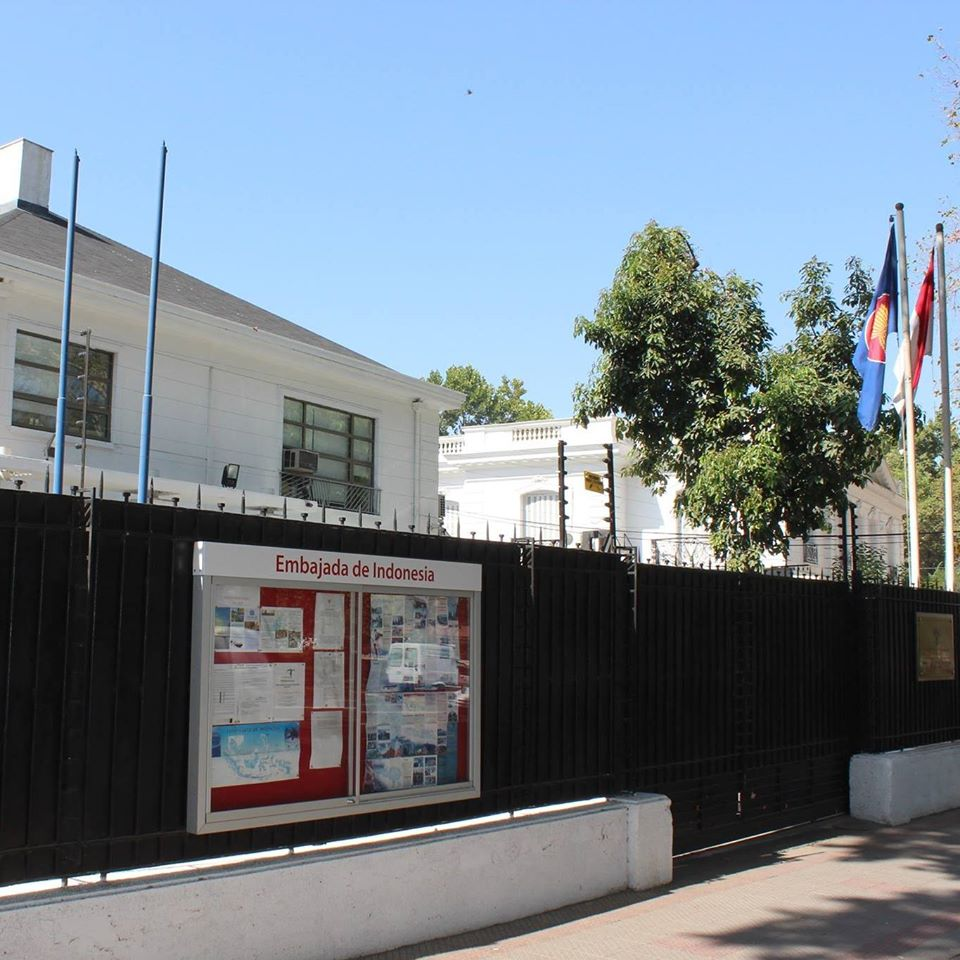
Embassy in Santiago

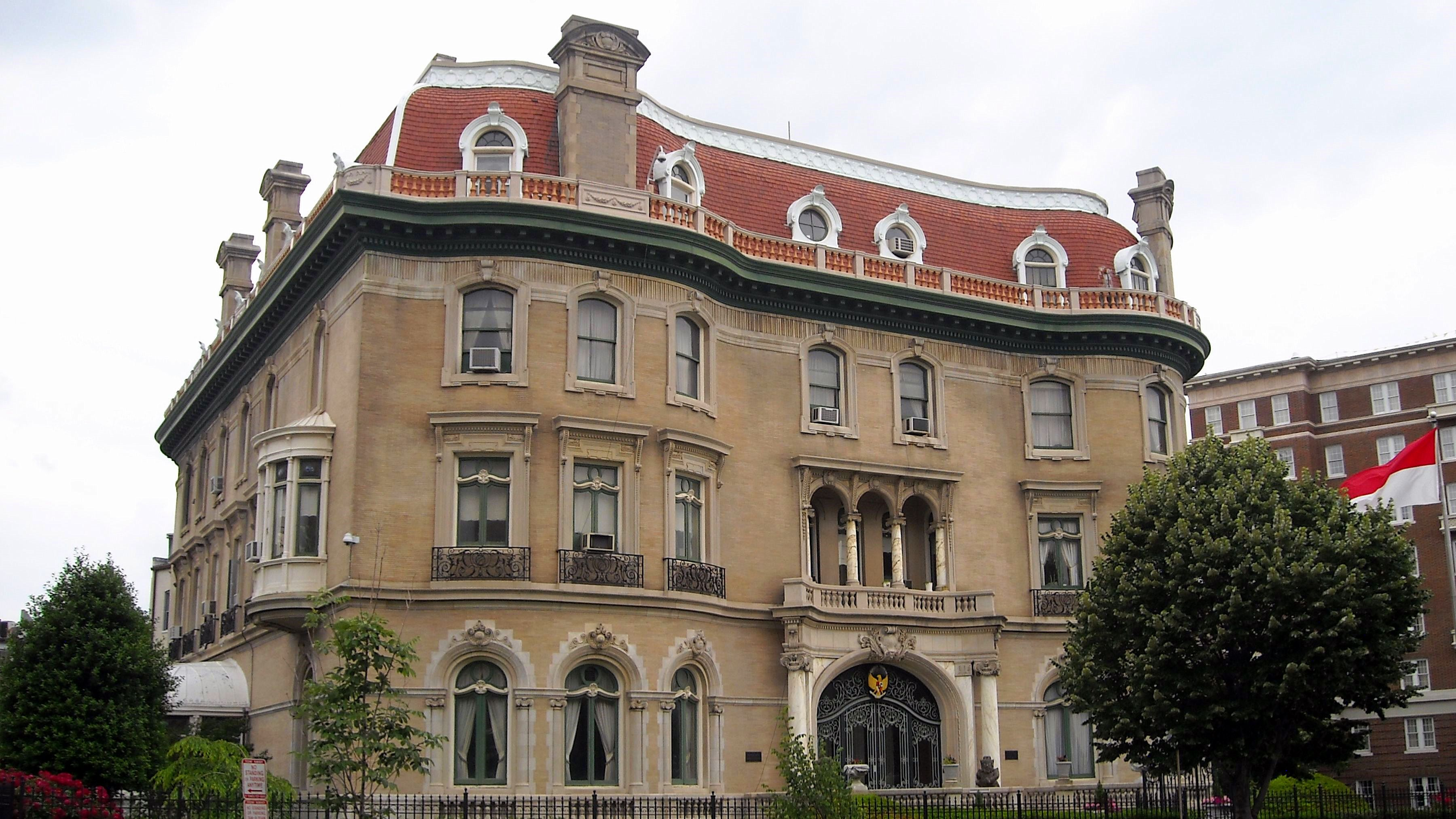
Embassy in Washington, D.C.

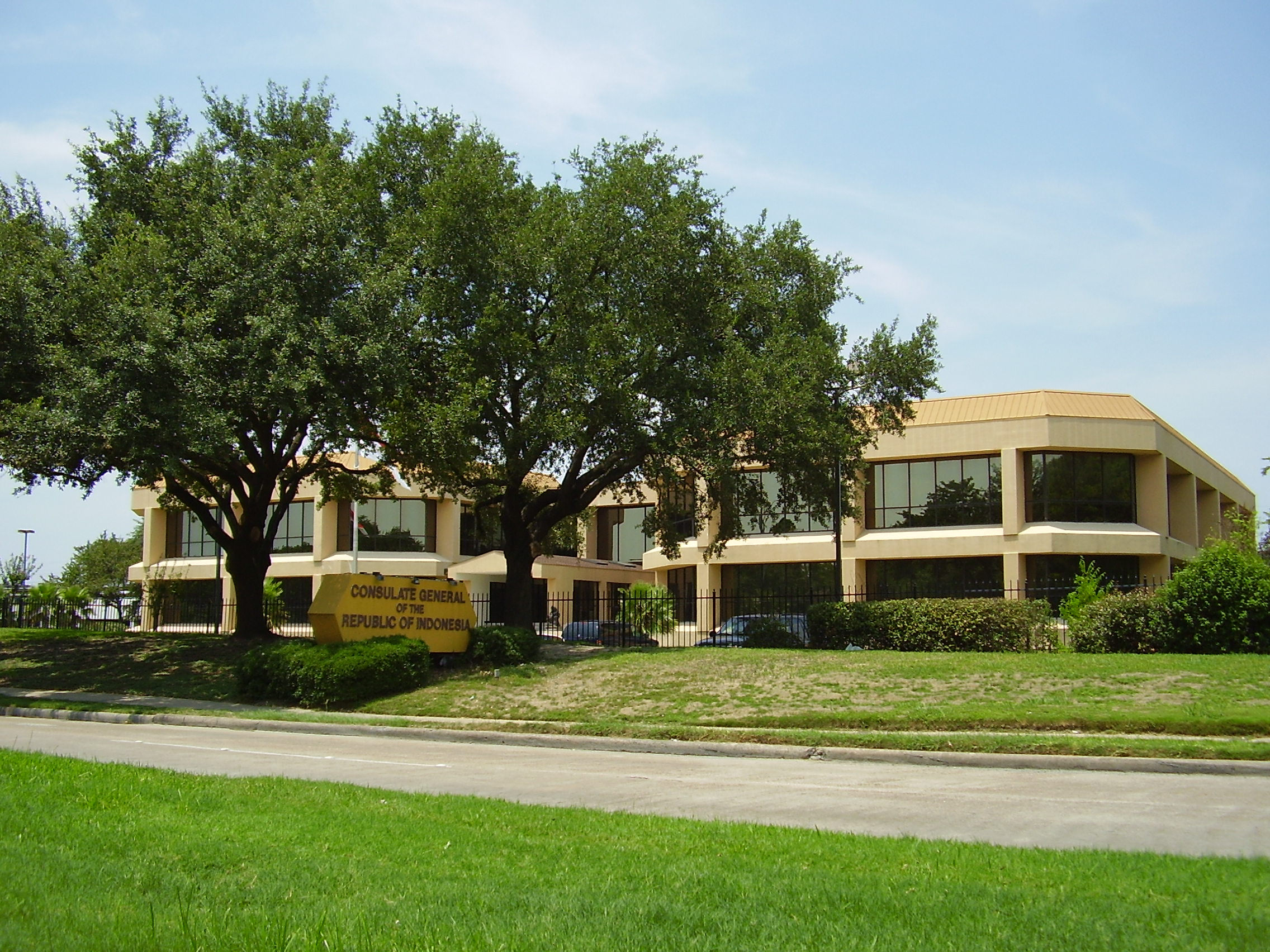
Consulate-General in Houston

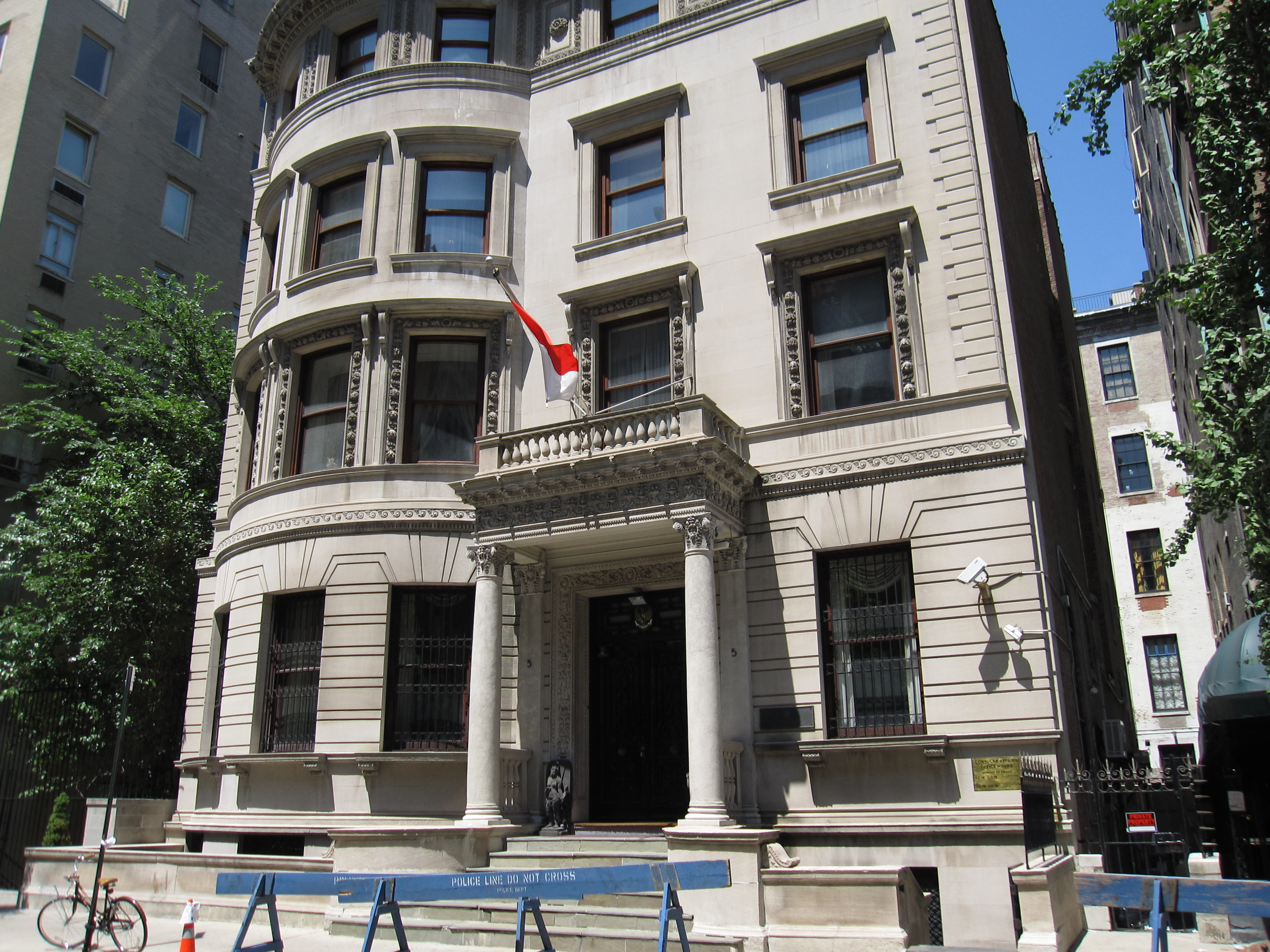
Consulate-General in New York

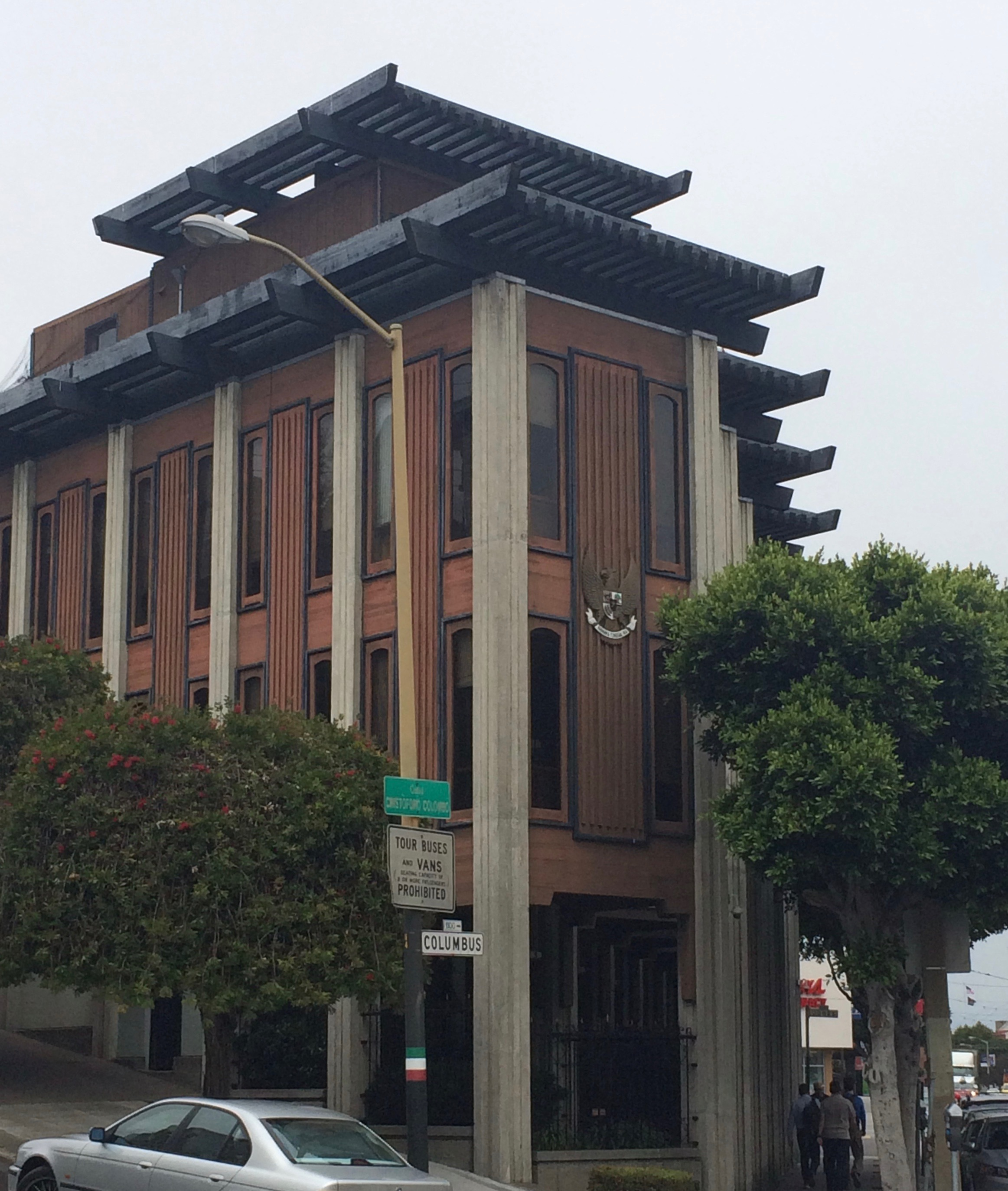
Consulate-General in San Francisco

=== Asia ===
Host country	Host city	Mission	Concurrent accreditation	Ref.
Afghanistan	Kabul	Embassy		
Azerbaijan	Baku	Embassy		
Bahrain	Manama	Embassy		
Bangladesh	Dhaka	Embassy	Countries: Nepal	
Brunei	Bandar Seri Begawan	Embassy		
Cambodia	Phnom Penh	Embassy		
China	Beijing	Embassy	Countries: Mongolia	
China	Guangzhou	Consulate-General	Countries: Mongolia	
China	Hong Kong	Consulate-General	Countries: Mongolia	
China	Shanghai	Consulate-General	Countries: Mongolia	
Georgia	Tbilisi	Embassy office (Note: Subordinate to the embassy in Kyiv, Ukraine.)		
India	New Delhi	Embassy	Countries: Bhutan	
India	Mumbai	Consulate-General	Countries: Bhutan	
Iran	Tehran	Embassy	Countries: Turkmenistan	
Iraq	Baghdad	Embassy		
Japan	Tokyo	Embassy	Countries: Micronesia	
Japan	Osaka	Consulate-General	Countries: Micronesia	
Jordan	Amman	Embassy	Countries: Palestine	
Kazakhstan	Astana	Embassy	Countries: Tajikistan	
Kuwait	Kuwait City	Embassy		
Laos	Vientiane	Embassy		
Lebanon	Beirut	Embassy		
Malaysia	Kuala Lumpur	Embassy		
Malaysia	George Town	Consulate-General		
Malaysia	Johor Bahru	Consulate-General		
Malaysia	Kota Kinabalu	Consulate-General		
Malaysia	Kuching	Consulate-General		
Malaysia	Tawau	Consulate		
Myanmar	Yangon	Embassy		
North Korea	Pyongyang	Embassy		
Oman	Muscat	Embassy	Countries: Yemen	
Pakistan	Islamabad	Embassy		
Pakistan	Karachi	Consulate-General		
Philippines	Manila	Embassy	Countries: Marshall Islands; Palau	
Philippines	Davao City	Consulate-General	Countries: Marshall Islands; Palau	
Qatar	Doha	Embassy		
Saudi Arabia	Riyadh	Embassy	Multilateral Organizations: Organisation of Islamic Cooperation	
Saudi Arabia	Jeddah	Consulate-General	Multilateral Organizations: Organisation of Islamic Cooperation	
Singapore	Singapore	Embassy		
South Korea	Seoul	Embassy		
Sri Lanka	Colombo	Embassy	Countries: Maldives	
Syria	Damascus	Embassy		
Taiwan	Taipei	Economic & Trade Office		
Thailand	Bangkok	Embassy	Multilateral Organizations: UN Economic and Social Commission for Asia and the Pacific	
Thailand	Songkhla	Consulate		
Timor-Leste	Dili	Embassy		
Timor-Leste	Pante Macassar	Embassy extension office		
Turkey	Ankara	Embassy		
Turkey	Istanbul	Consulate-General		
United Arab Emirates	Abu Dhabi	Embassy		
United Arab Emirates	Dubai	Consulate-General		
Uzbekistan	Tashkent	Embassy	Countries: Kyrgyzstan	
Vietnam	Hanoi	Embassy		
Vietnam	Ho Chi Minh City	Consulate-General		

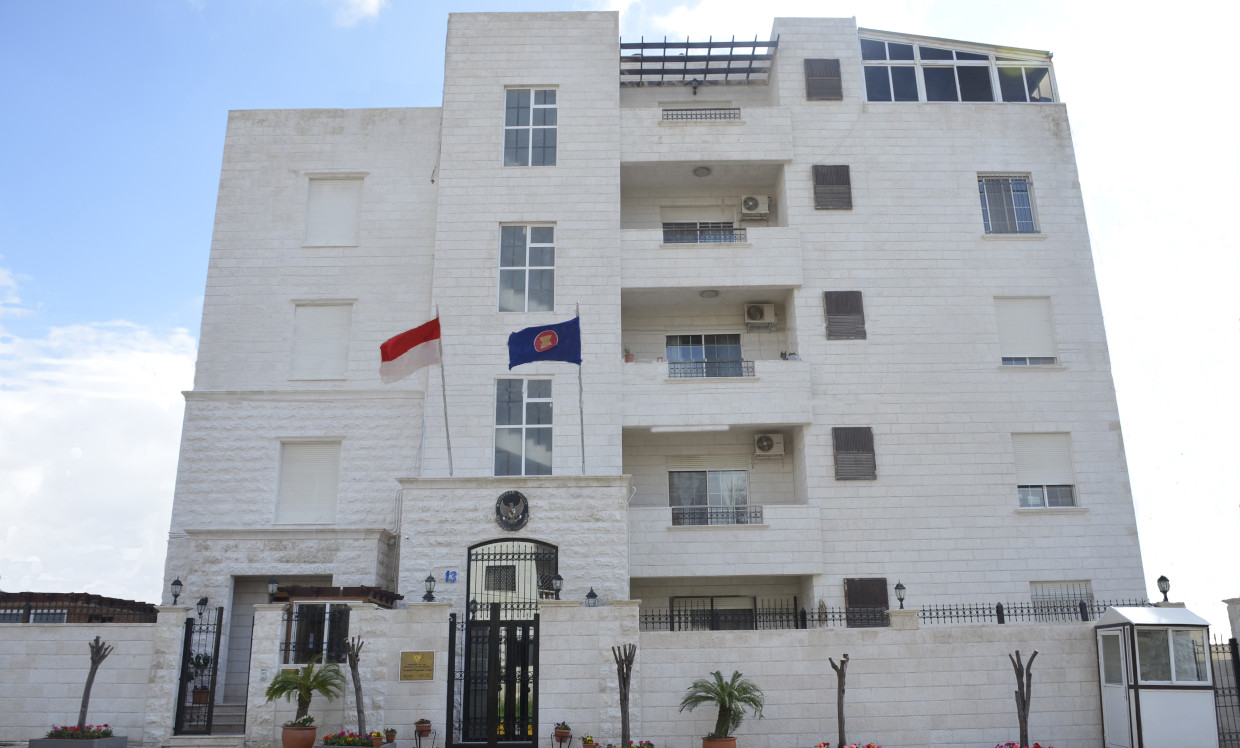
Embassy in Amman

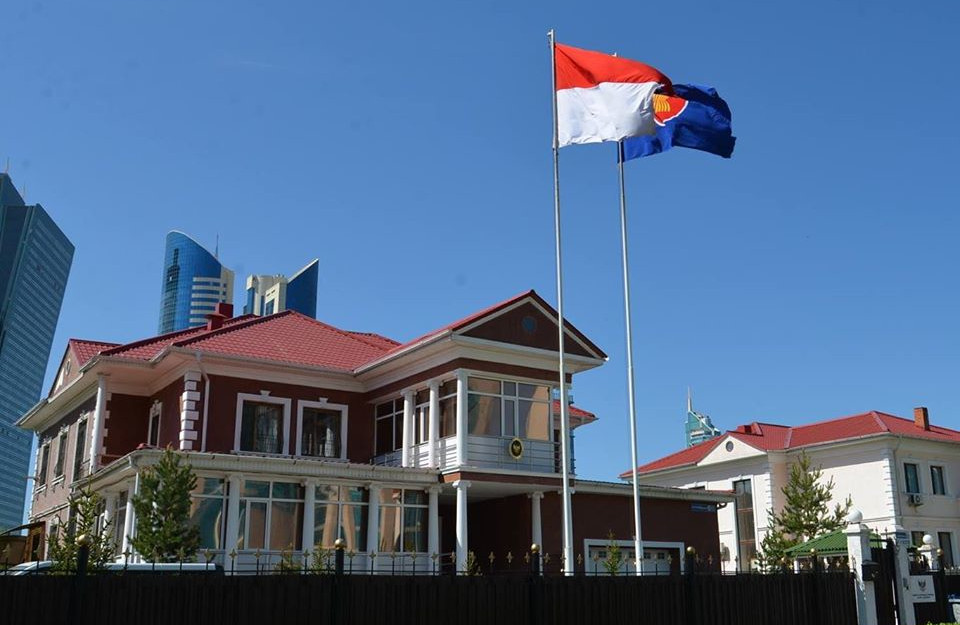
Embassy in Astana

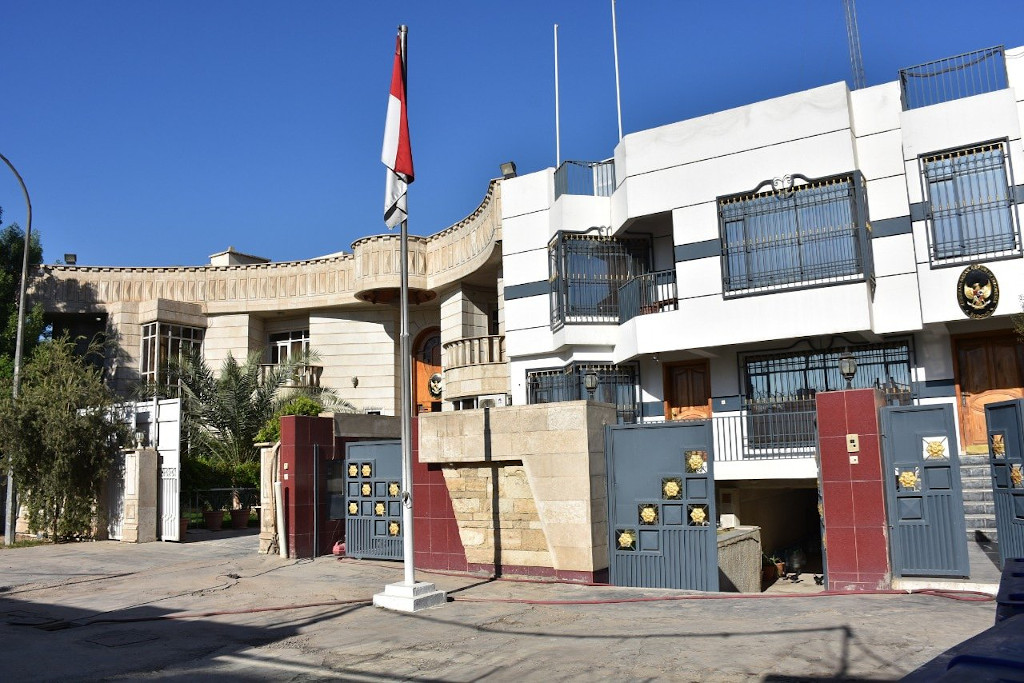
Embassy in Baghdad

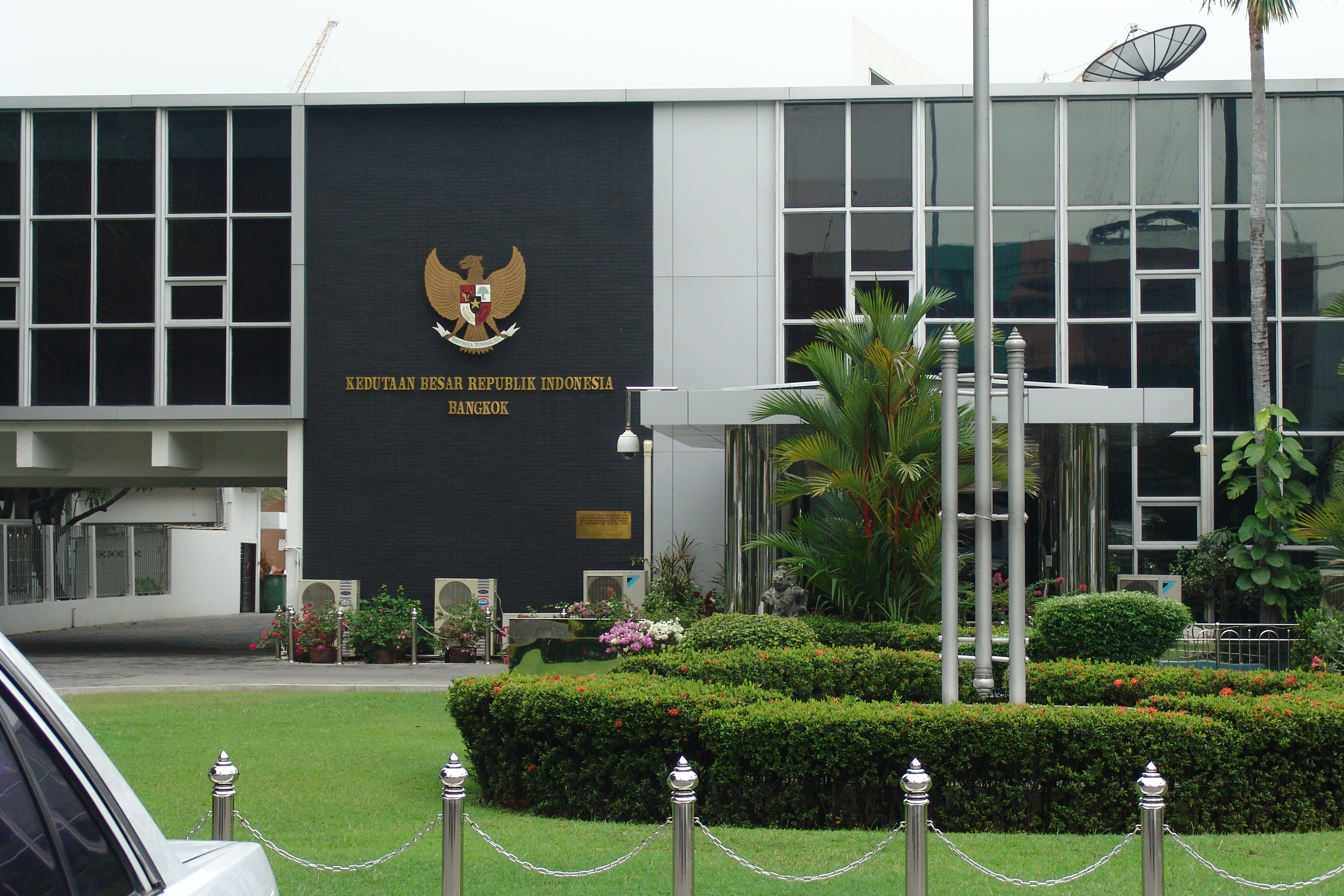
Embassy in Bangkok

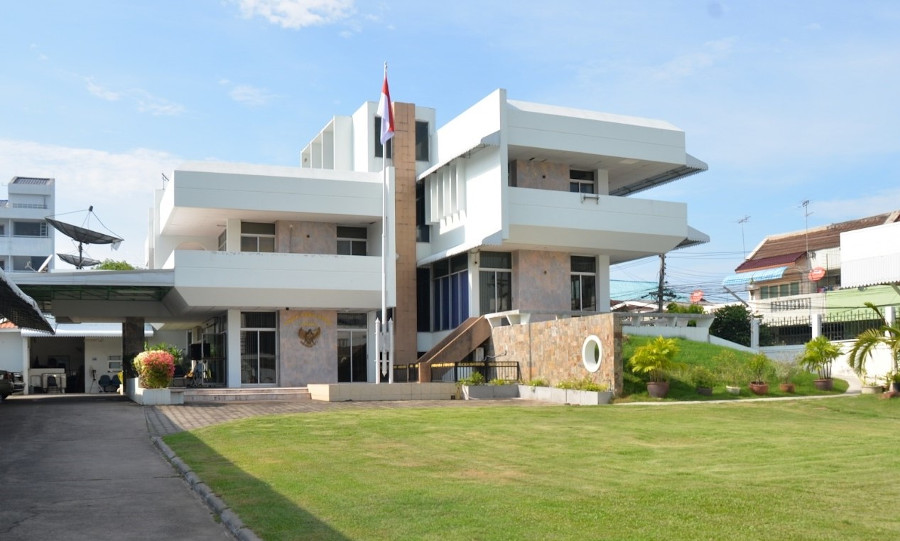
Consulate in Songkhla

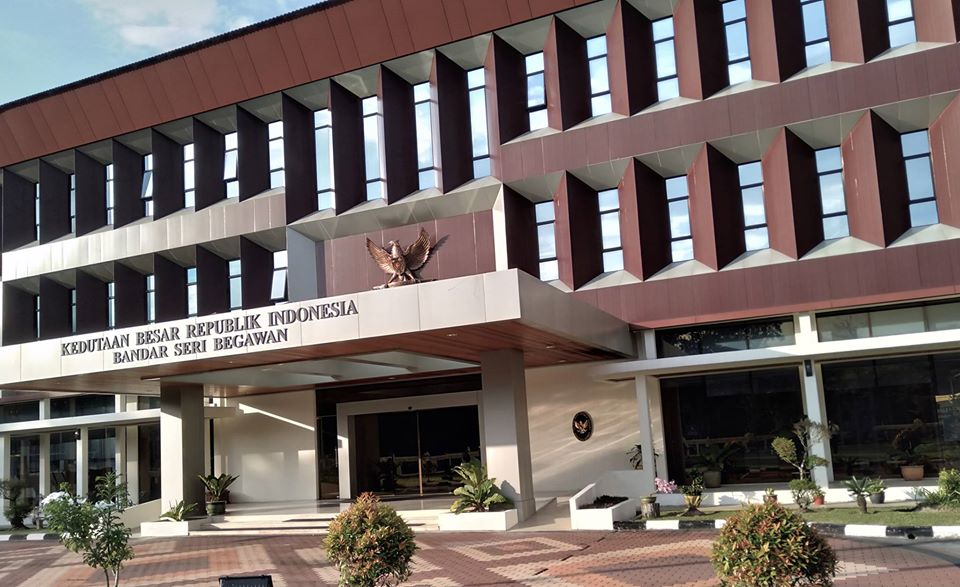
Embassy in Bandar Seri Begawan

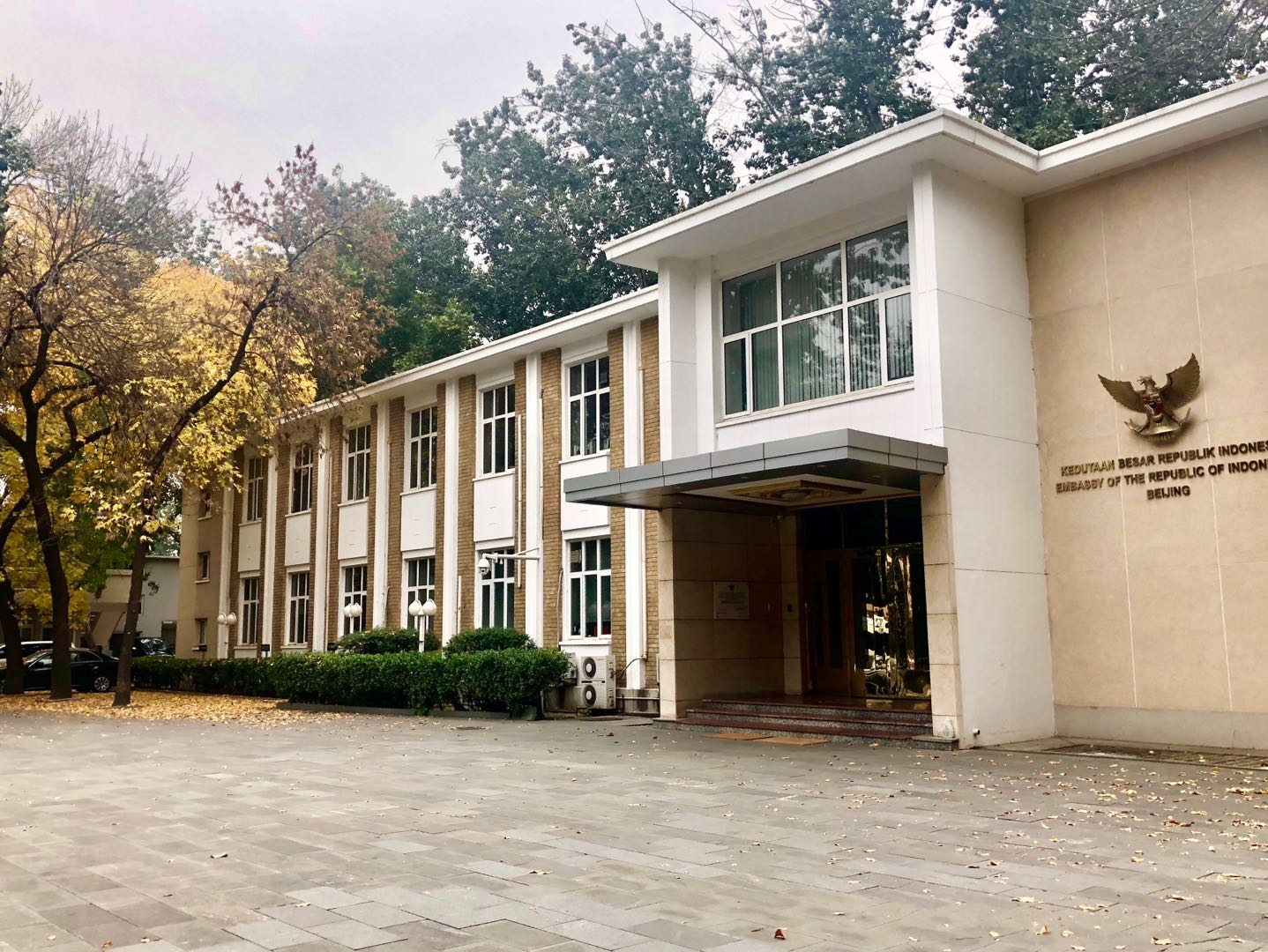
Embassy in Beijing

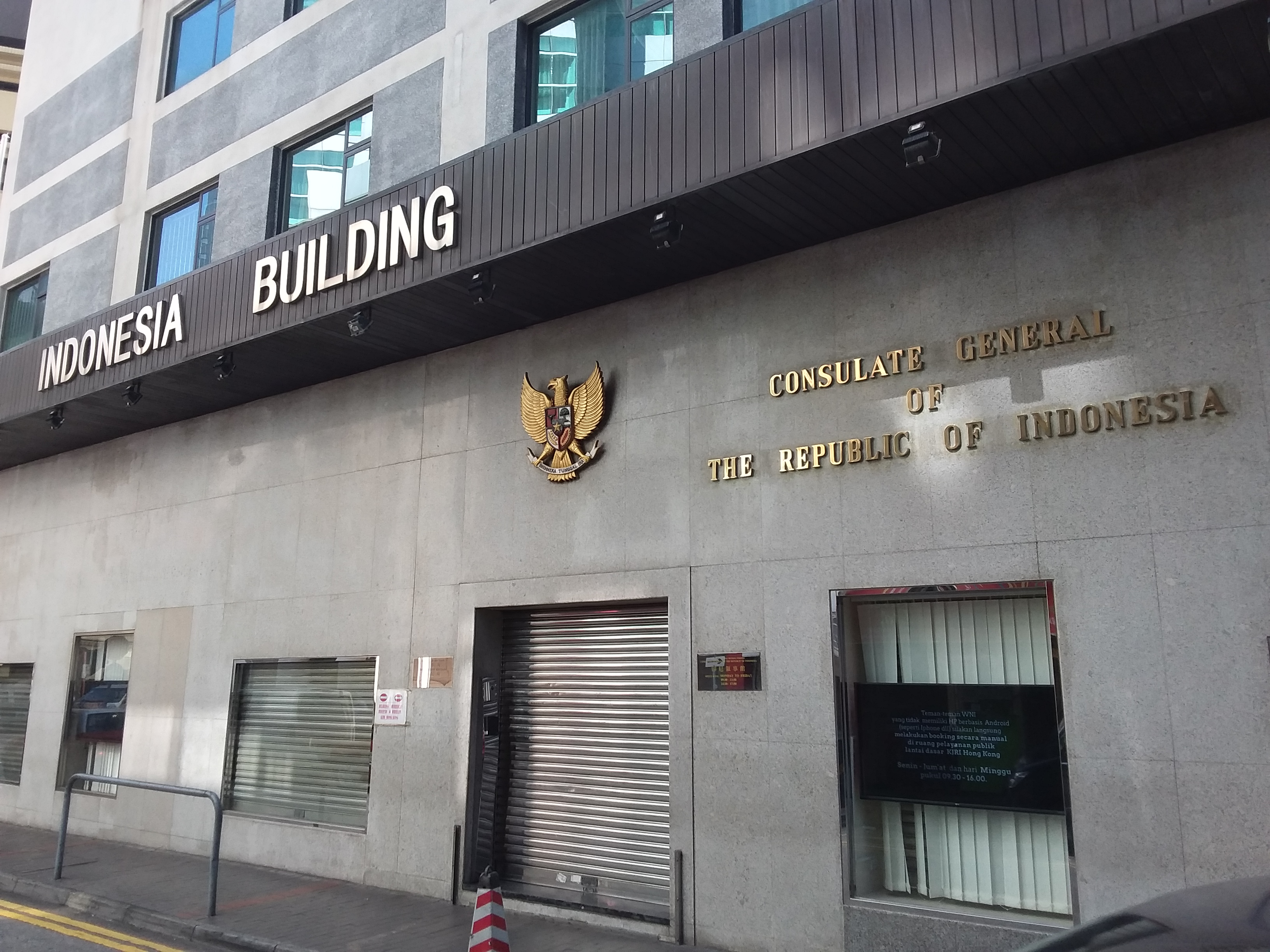
Consulate General in Hong Kong

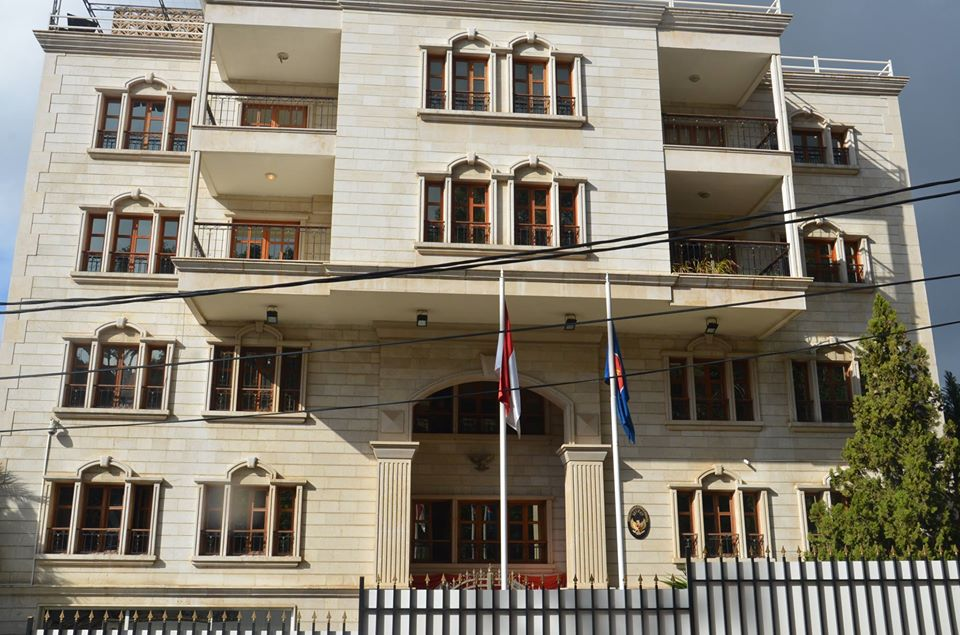
Embassy in Beirut

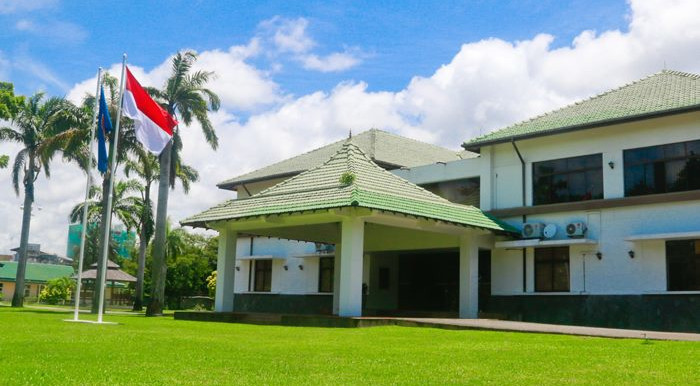
Embassy in Colombo

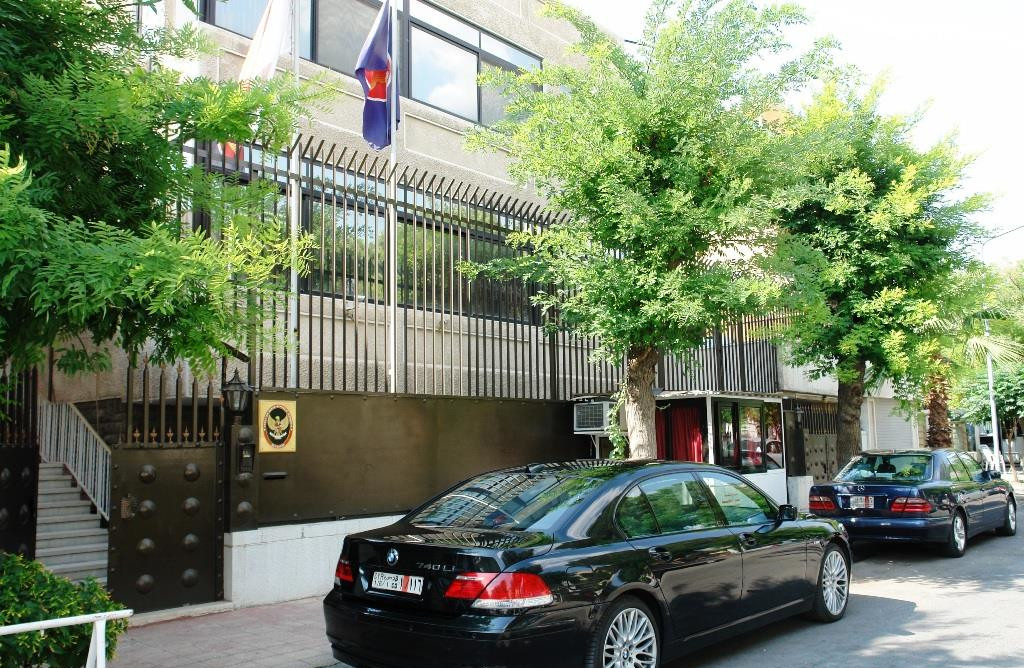
Embassy in Damascus

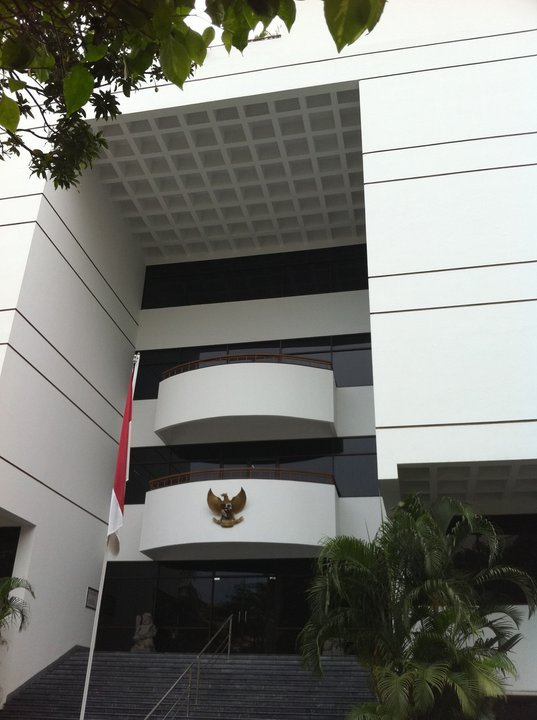
Embassy in Dhaka

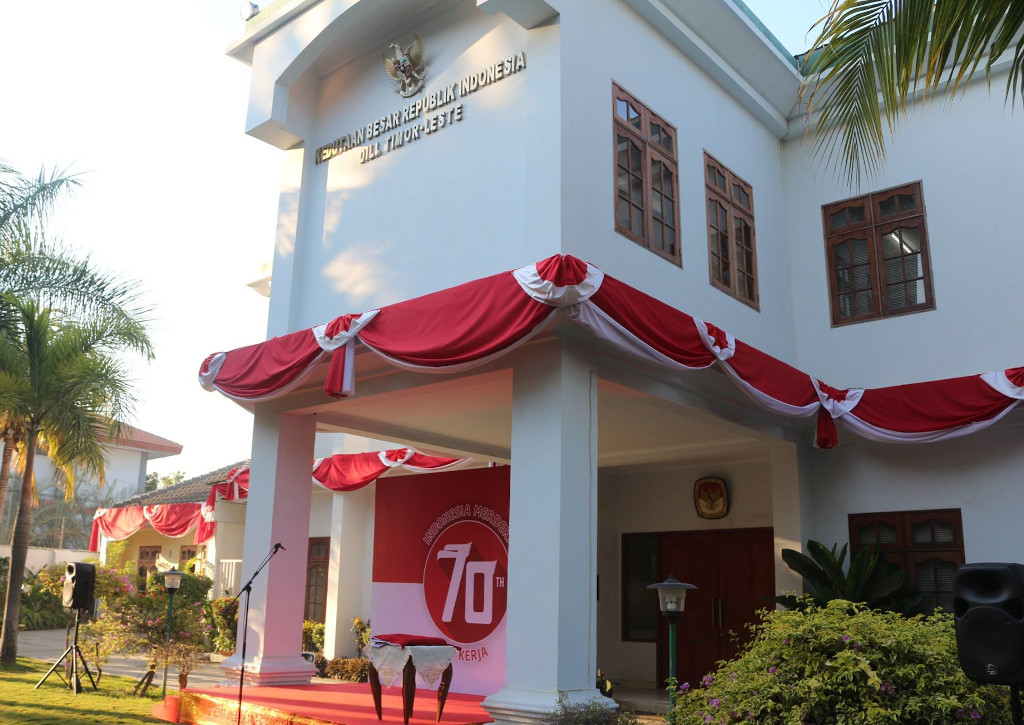
Embassy in Dili

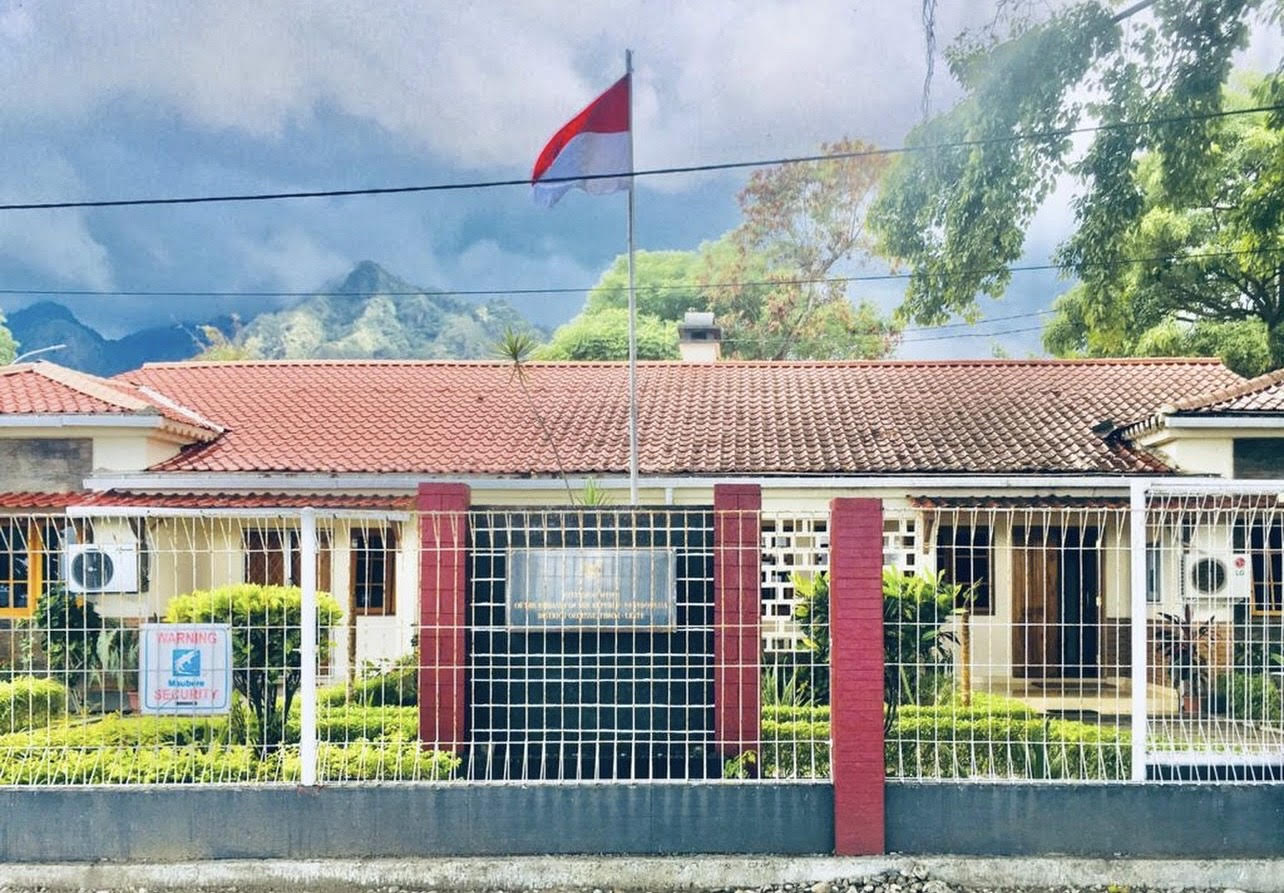
Embassy extension office in Pante Macassar

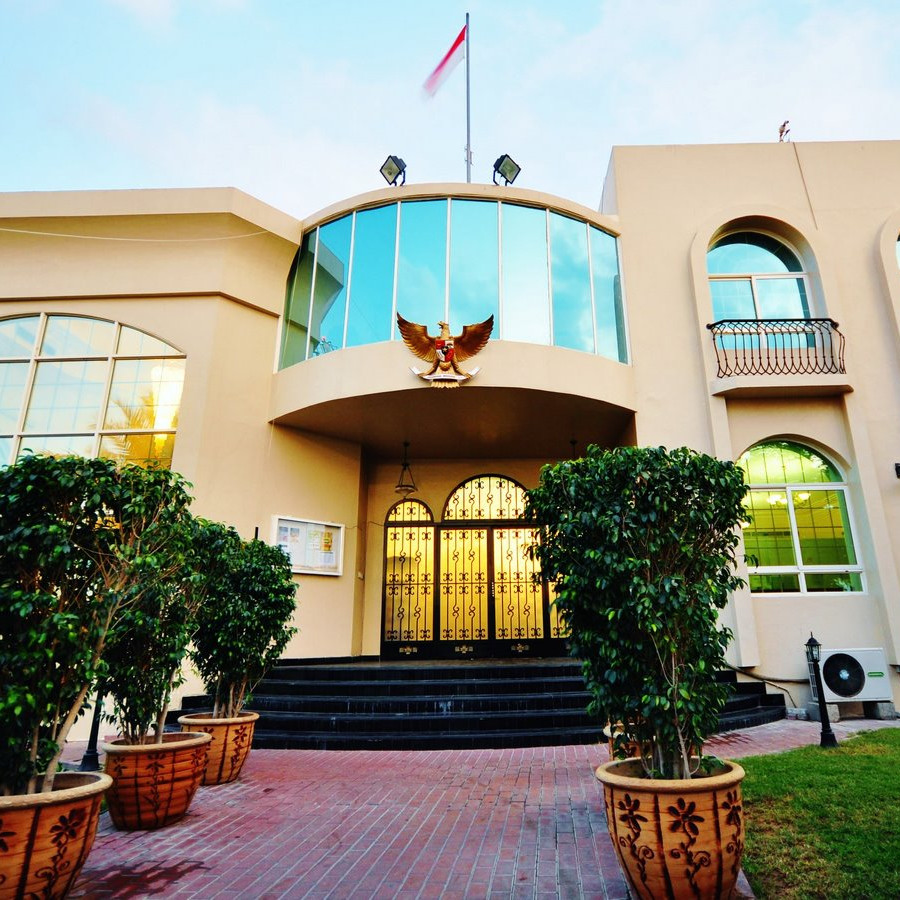
Consulate-General in Dubai

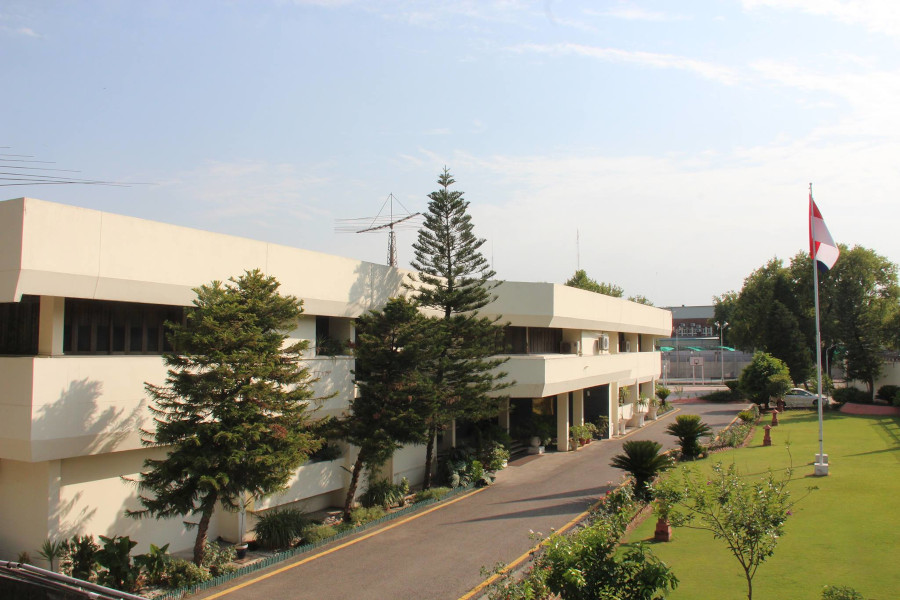
Embassy in Islamabad

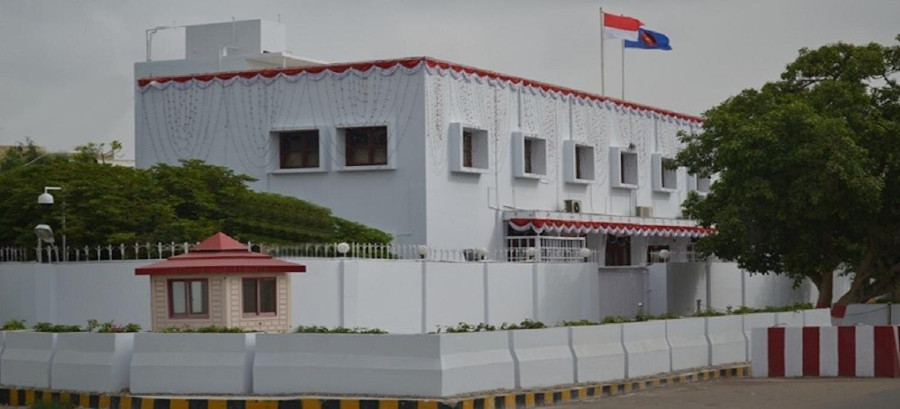
Consulate-General in Karachi

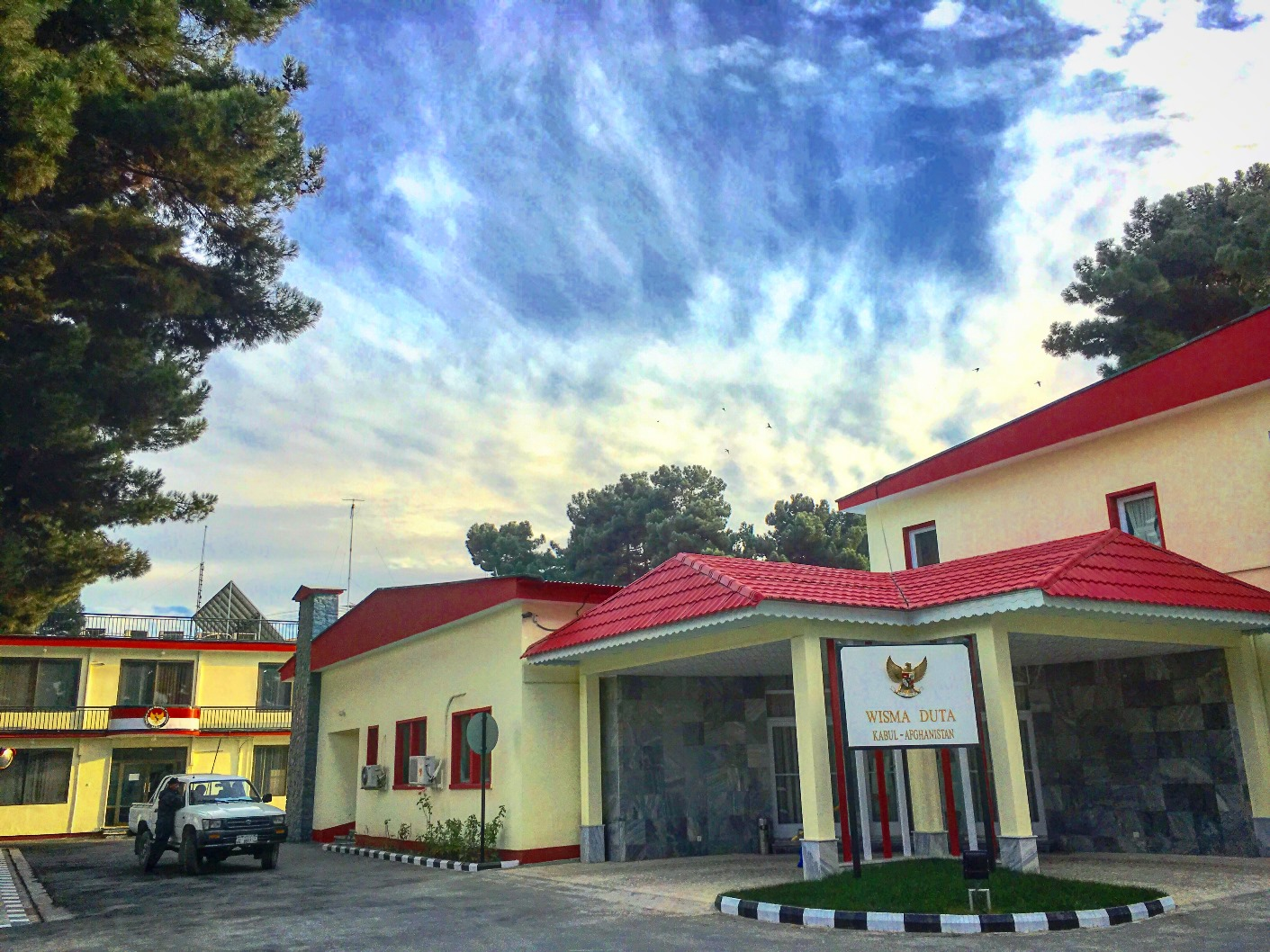
Embassy in Kabul

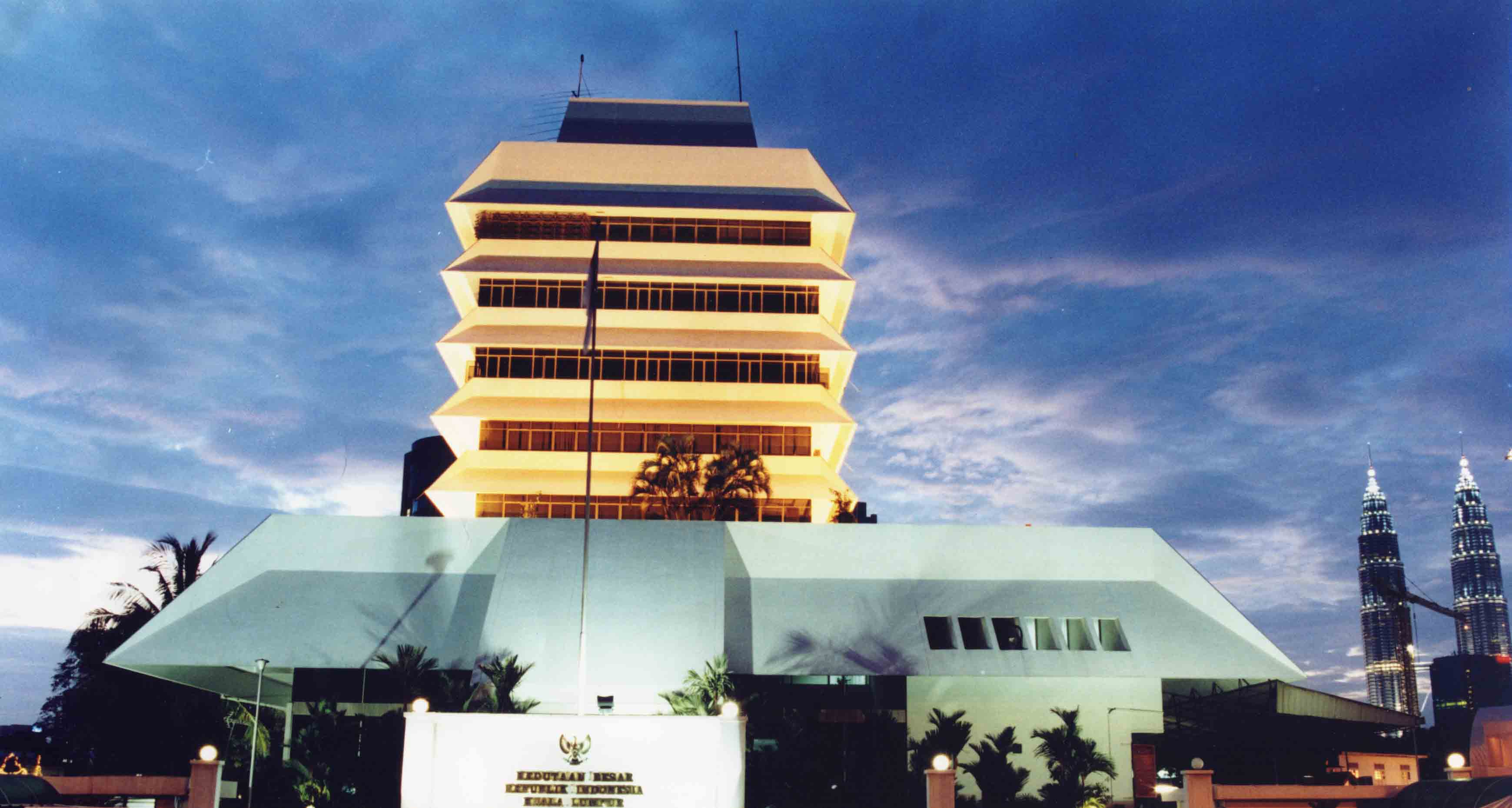
Embassy in Kuala Lumpur

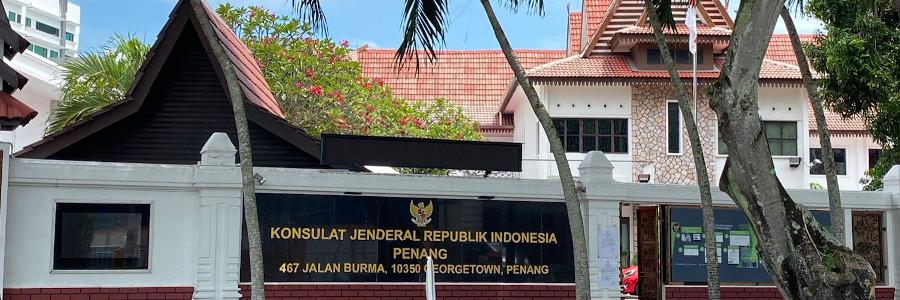
Consulate-General in George Town

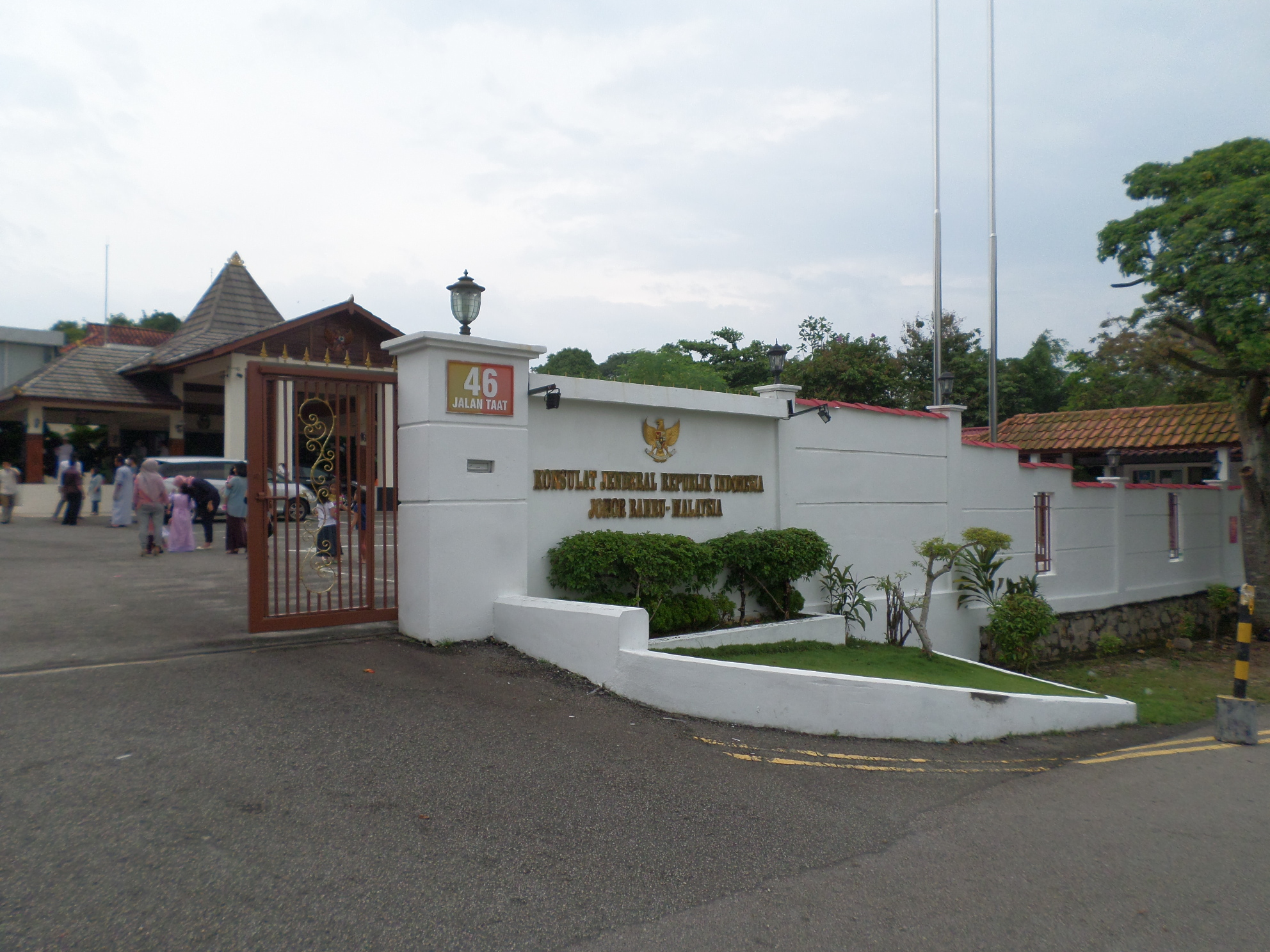
Consulate-General in Johor Bahru

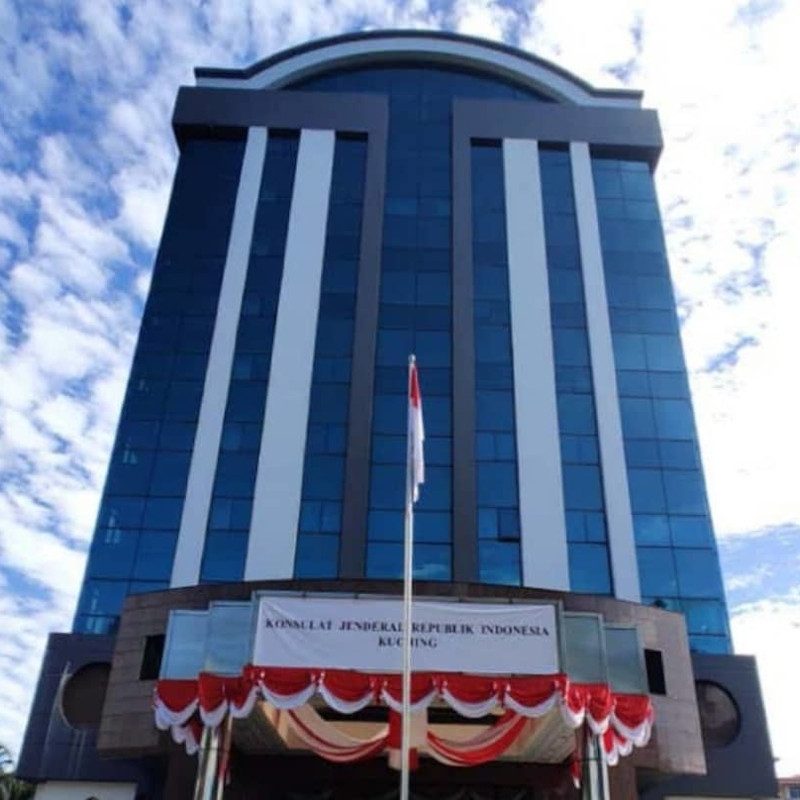
Consulate-General in Kuching

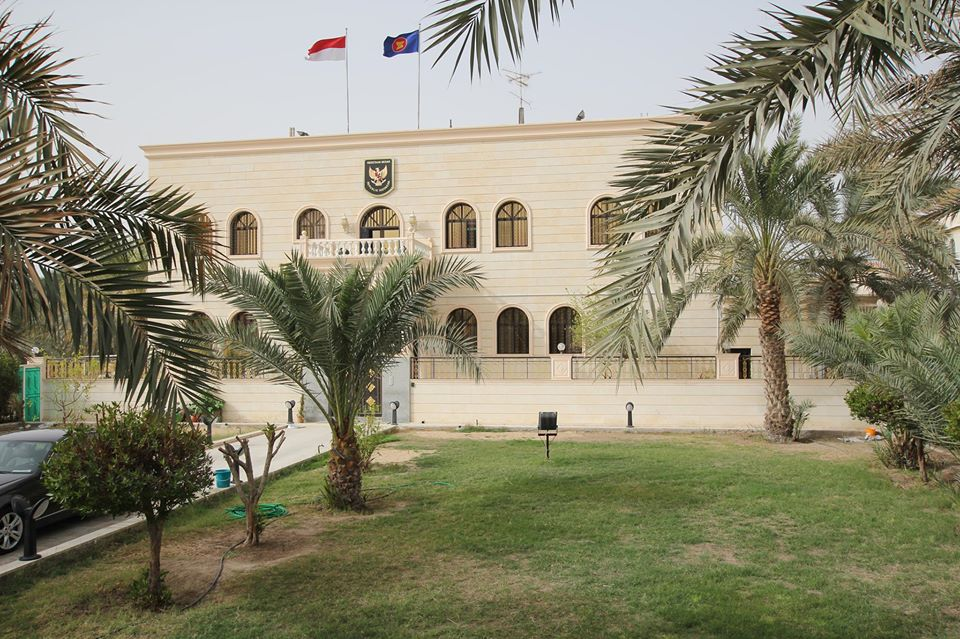
Embassy in Kuwait City

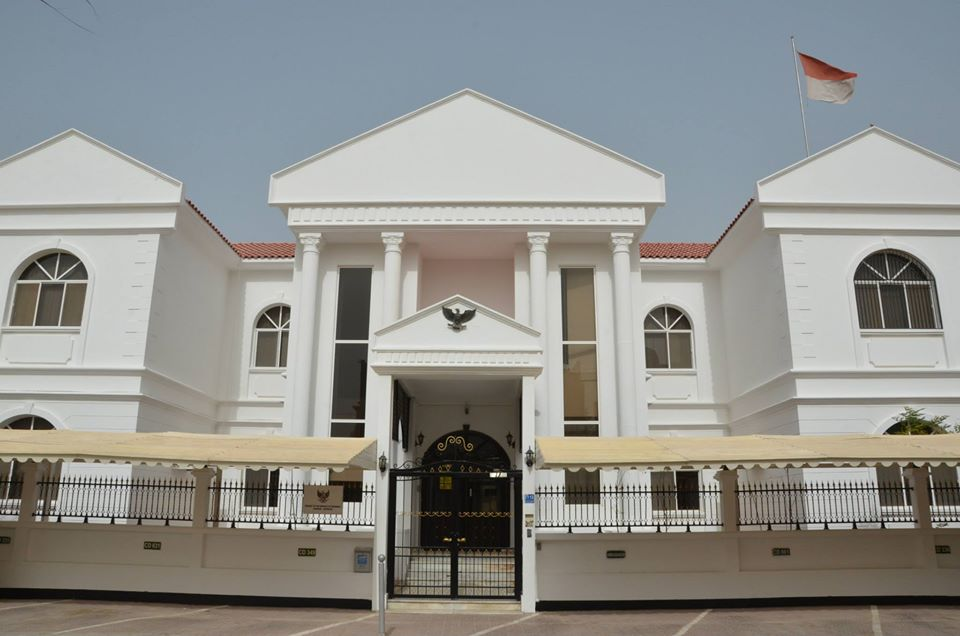
Embassy in Manama

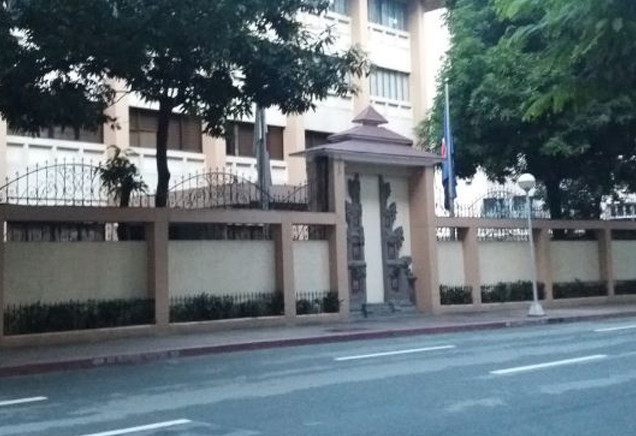
Embassy in Manila

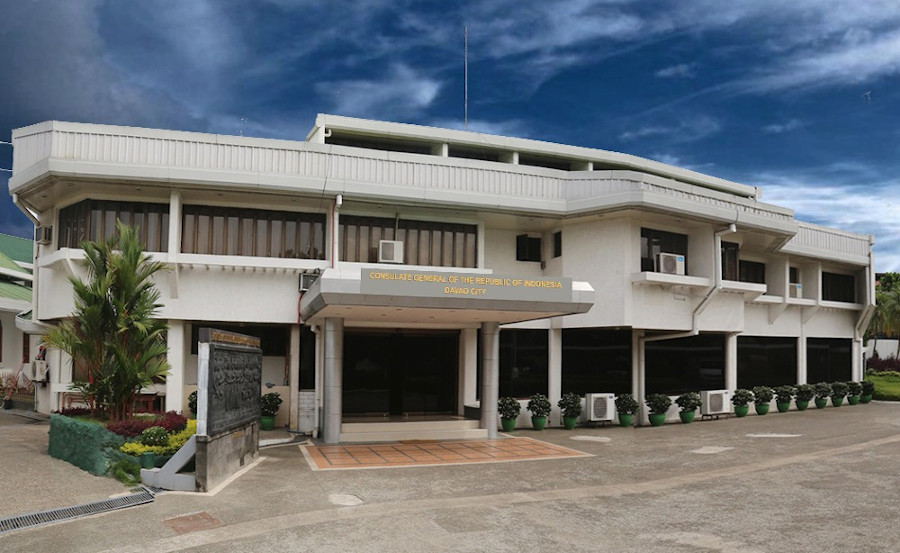
Consulate-General in Davao City

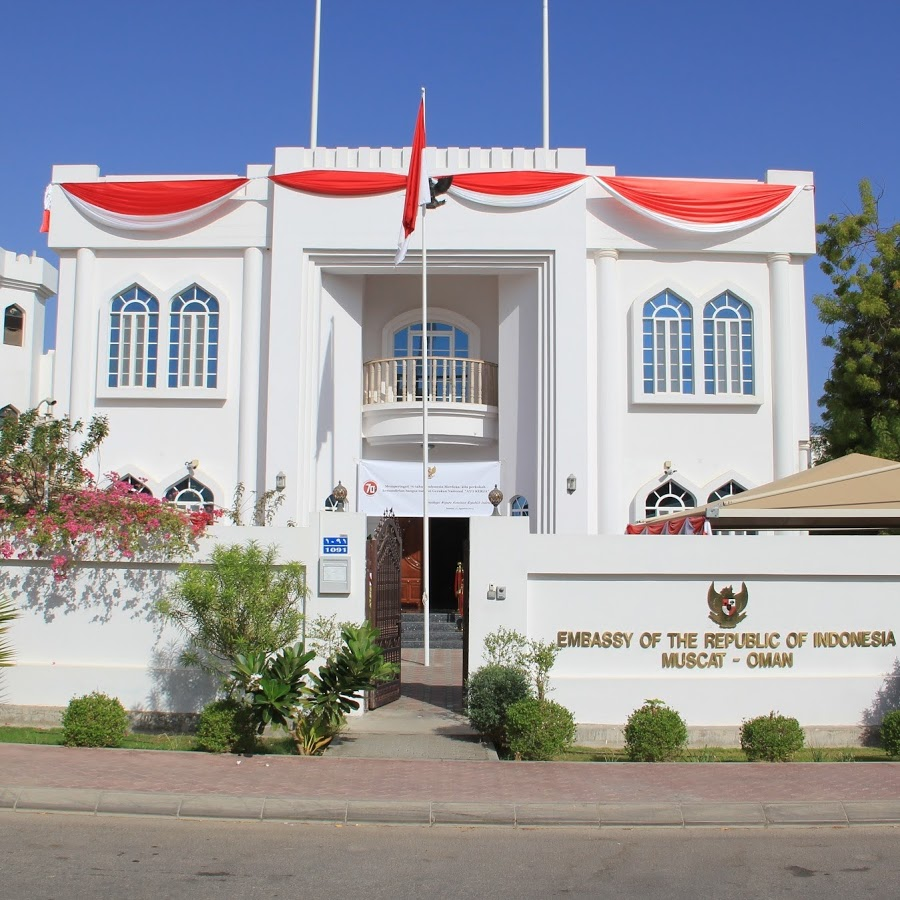
Embassy in Muscat

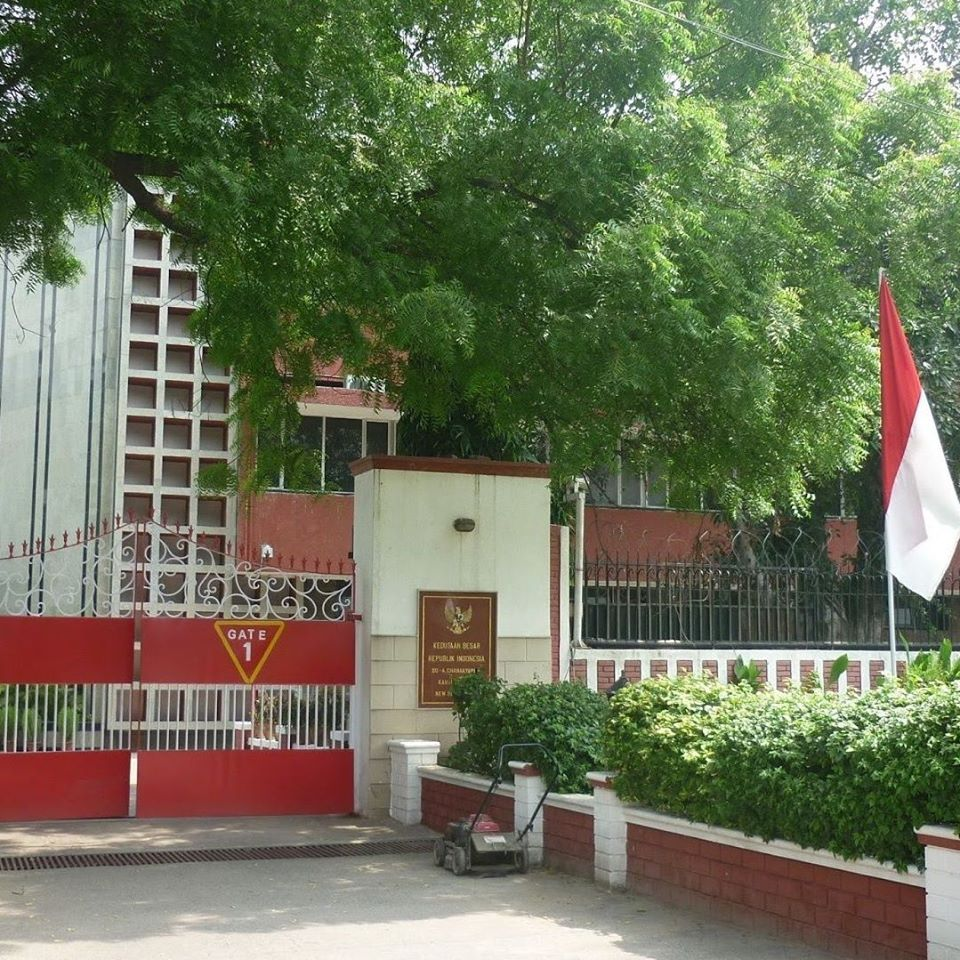
Embassy in New Delhi

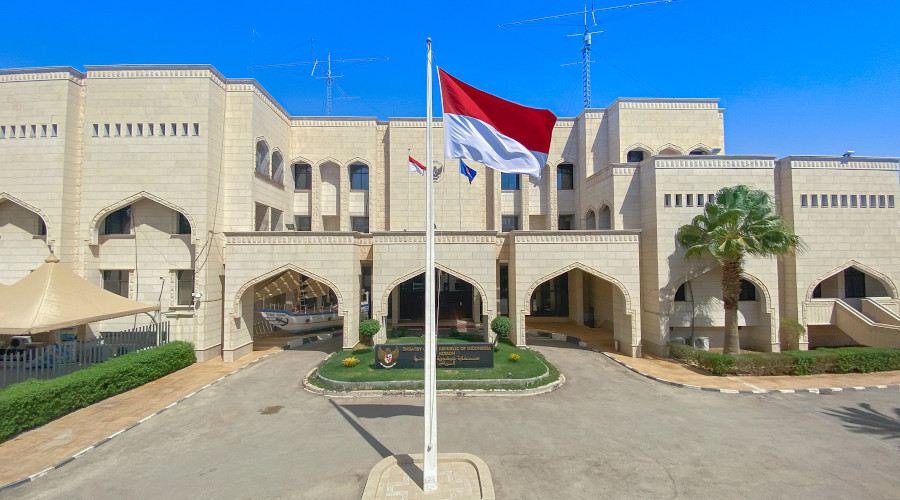
Embassy in Riyadh

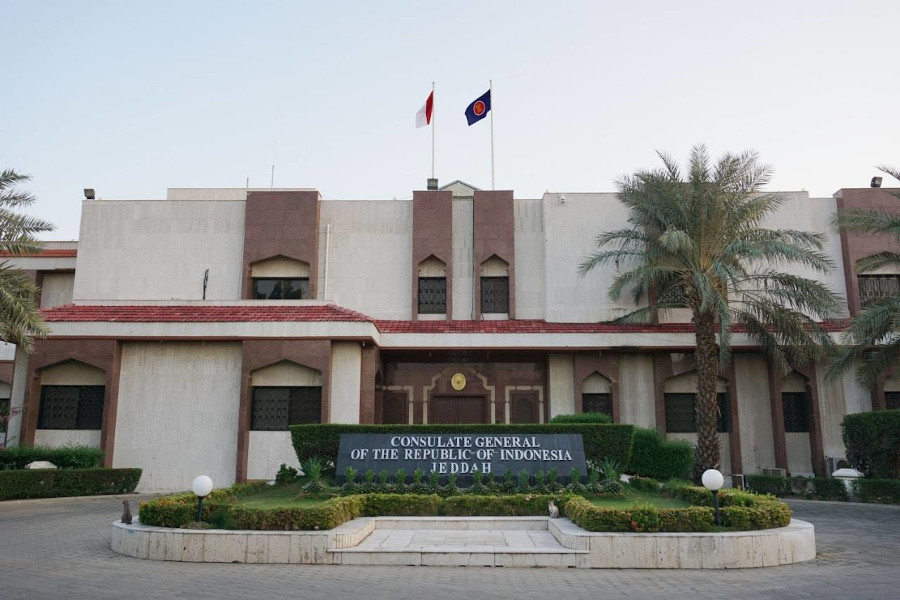
Consulate-General in Jeddah

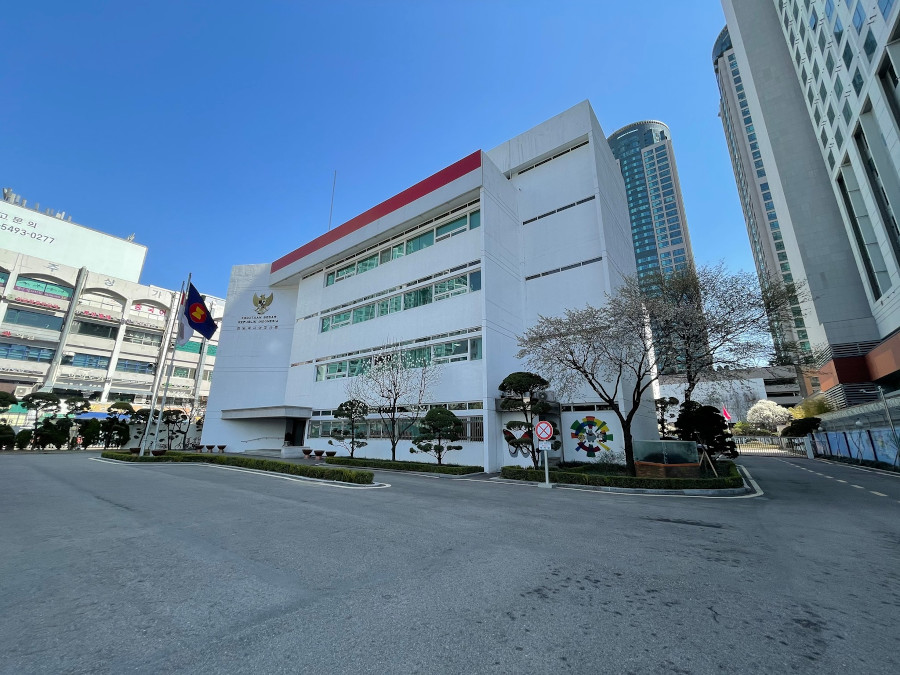
Embassy in Seoul

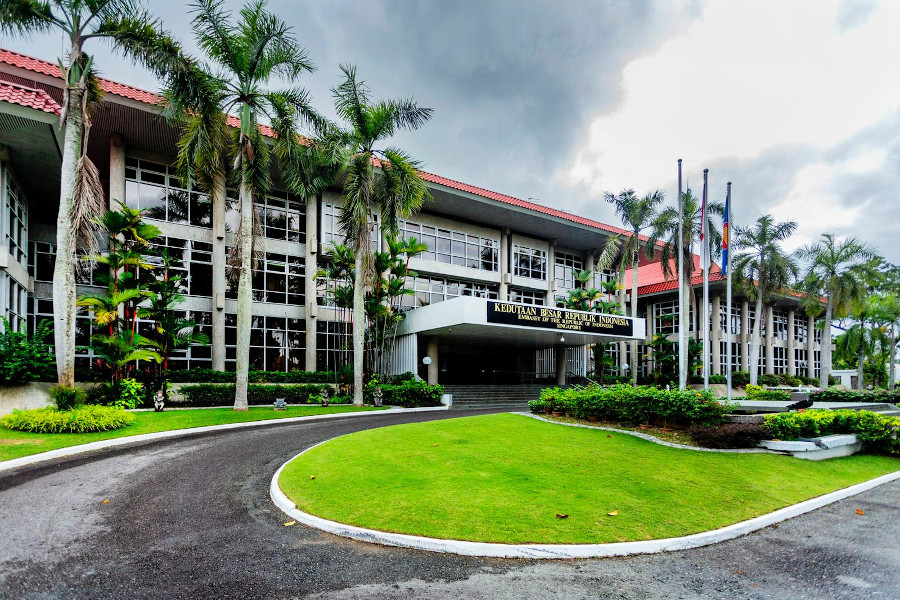
Embassy in Singapore

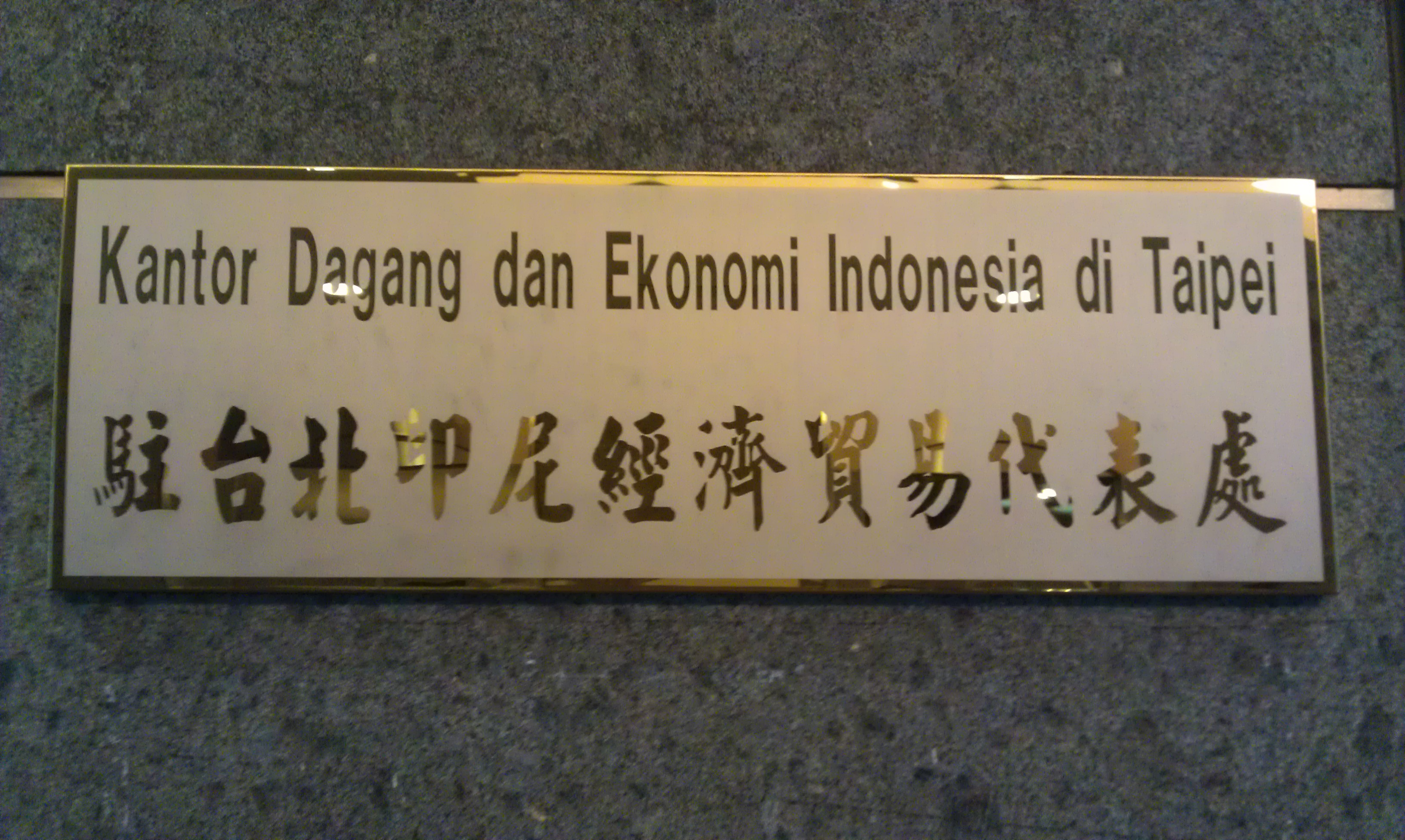
Economic and Trade Office in Taipei

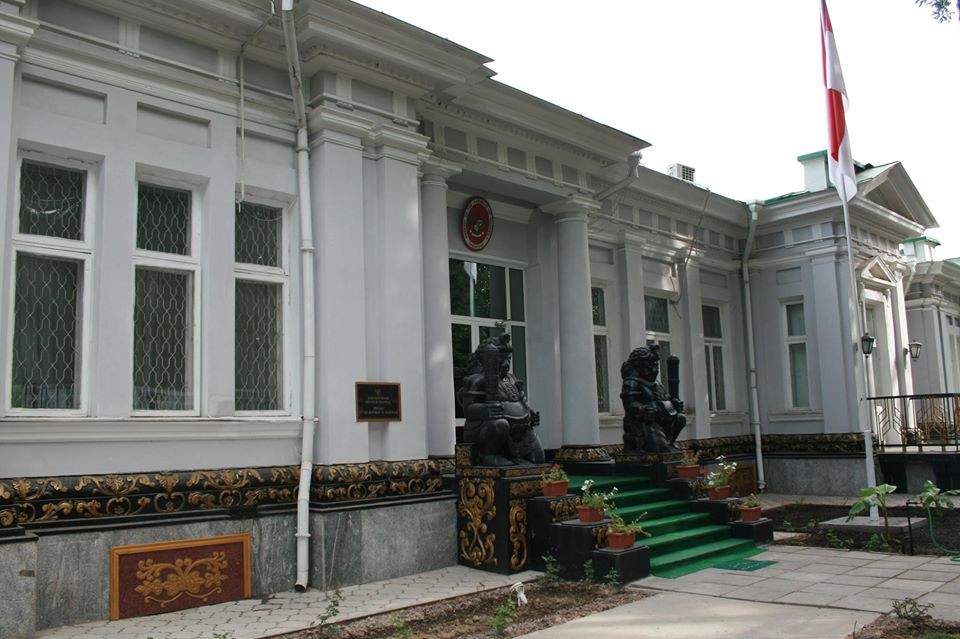
Embassy in Tashkent

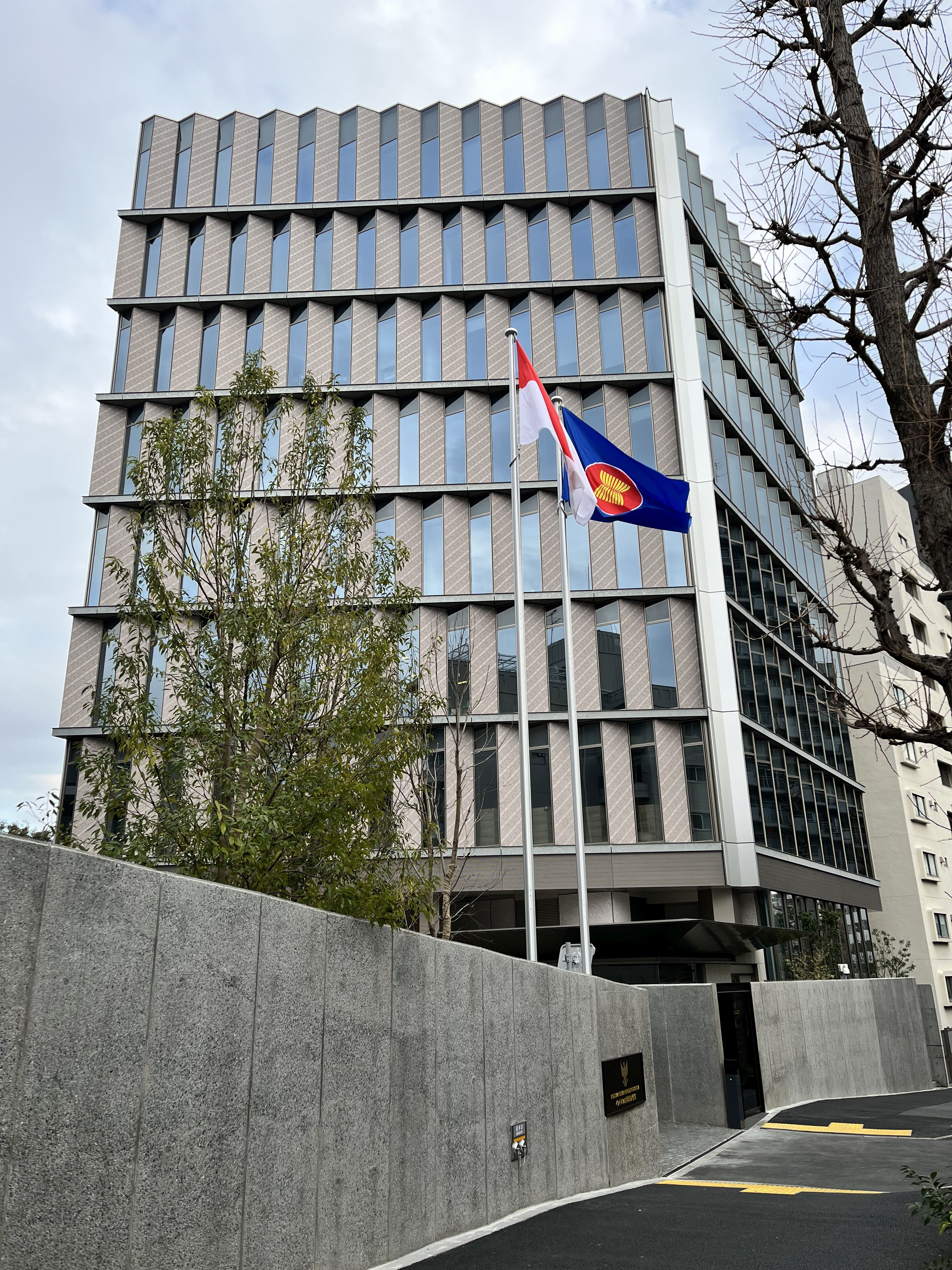
Embassy in Tokyo

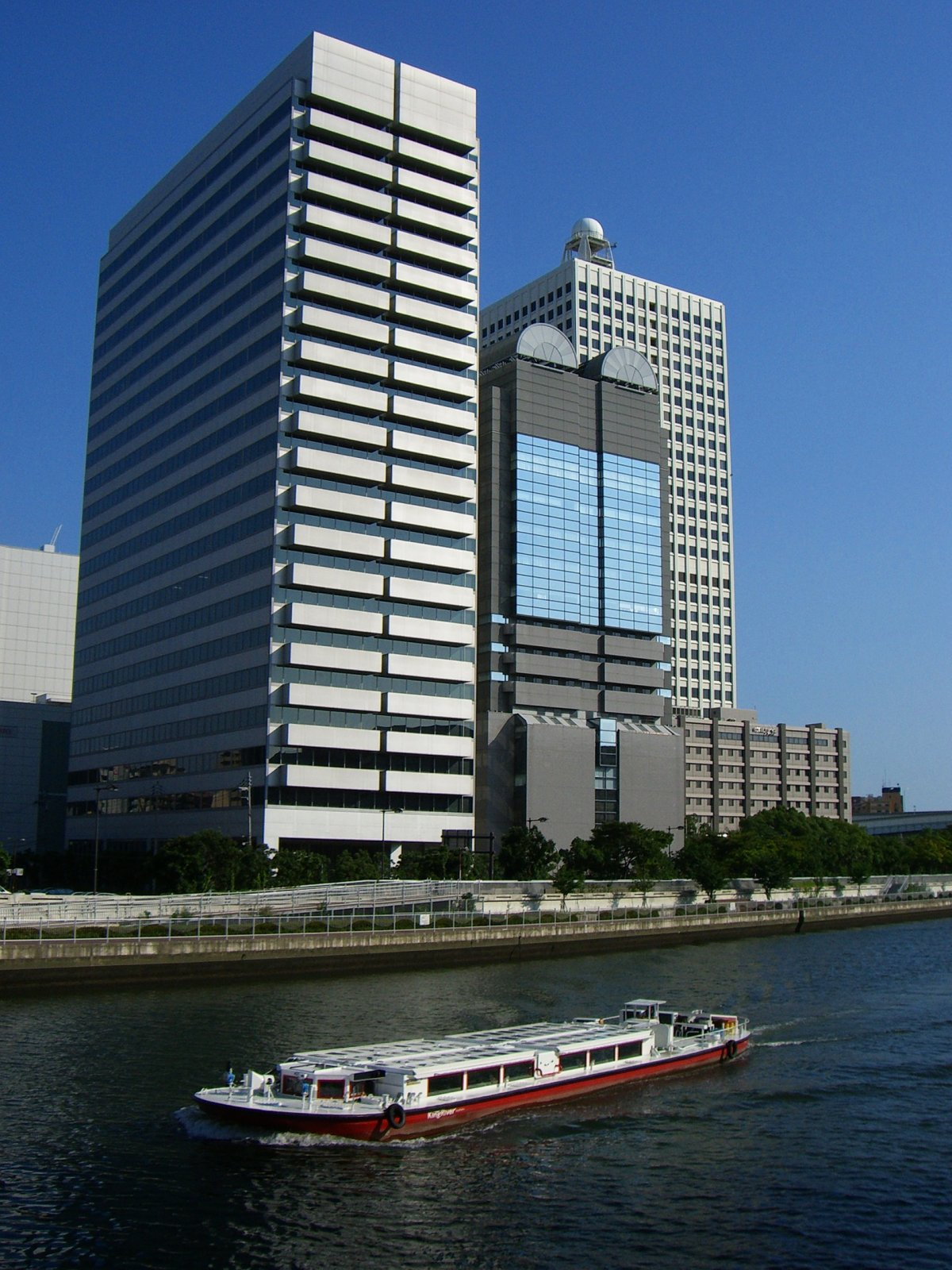
Building hosting Consulate General of Indonesia in Osaka

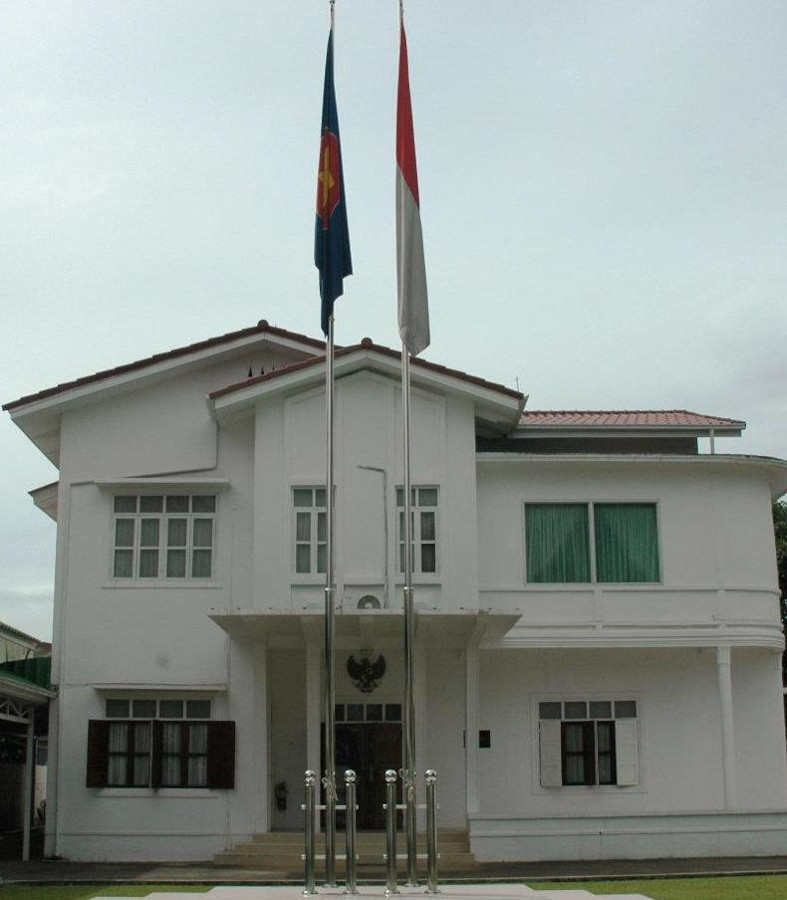
Embassy in Vientiane

=== Europe ===
Host country	Host city	Mission	Concurrent accreditation	Ref.
Austria	Vienna	Embassy	Countries: Slovenia; Multilateral Organizations: United Nations; IACA; IAEA; UNIDO; UNODC; CTBTO; OPEC Fund	
Belgium	Brussels	Embassy	Countries: Luxembourg; Multilateral Organizations: European Union; World Customs Organization	
Bosnia and Herzegovina	Sarajevo	Embassy		
Bulgaria	Sofia	Embassy	Countries: Albania; North Macedonia	
Croatia	Zagreb	Embassy		
Czechia	Prague	Embassy		
Denmark	Copenhagen	Embassy	Countries: Lithuania	
Finland	Helsinki	Embassy	Countries: Estonia	
France	Paris	Embassy	Countries: Andorra; Monaco; Multilateral Organizations: UNESCO	
France	Marseille	Consulate-General	Countries: Andorra; Monaco; Multilateral Organizations: UNESCO	
France	Nouméa, New Caledonia	Consulate-General	Countries: Andorra; Monaco; Multilateral Organizations: UNESCO	
Germany	Berlin	Embassy		
Germany	Frankfurt	Consulate-General		
Germany	Hamburg	Consulate-General		
Greece	Athens	Embassy		
Holy See (Note: The Indonesia Embassy to the Holy See is located outside Vatican territory in Rome.)	Rome	Embassy		
Hungary	Budapest	Embassy		
Italy	Rome	Embassy	Countries: Cyprus; Malta; San Marino; Multilateral Organizations: Food and Agriculture Organization; International Fund for Agricultural Development; World Food Programme; UNIDROIT	
Netherlands	The Hague	Embassy	Multilateral Organizations: Organisation for the Prohibition of Chemical Weapons	
Norway	Oslo	Embassy	Countries: Iceland	
Poland	Warsaw	Embassy		
Portugal	Lisbon	Embassy		
Romania	Bucharest	Embassy	Countries: Moldova	
Russia	Moscow	Embassy	Countries: Belarus	
Serbia	Belgrade	Embassy	Countries: Montenegro	
Slovakia	Bratislava	Embassy		
Spain	Madrid	Embassy	Multilateral Organizations: UN Tourism	
Sweden	Stockholm	Embassy	Countries: Latvia	
Switzerland	Bern	Embassy	Countries: Liechtenstein	
Ukraine	Kyiv	Embassy	Countries: Armenia; Georgia	
United Kingdom	London	Embassy	Countries: Ireland; Multilateral Organizations: International Maritime Organization	

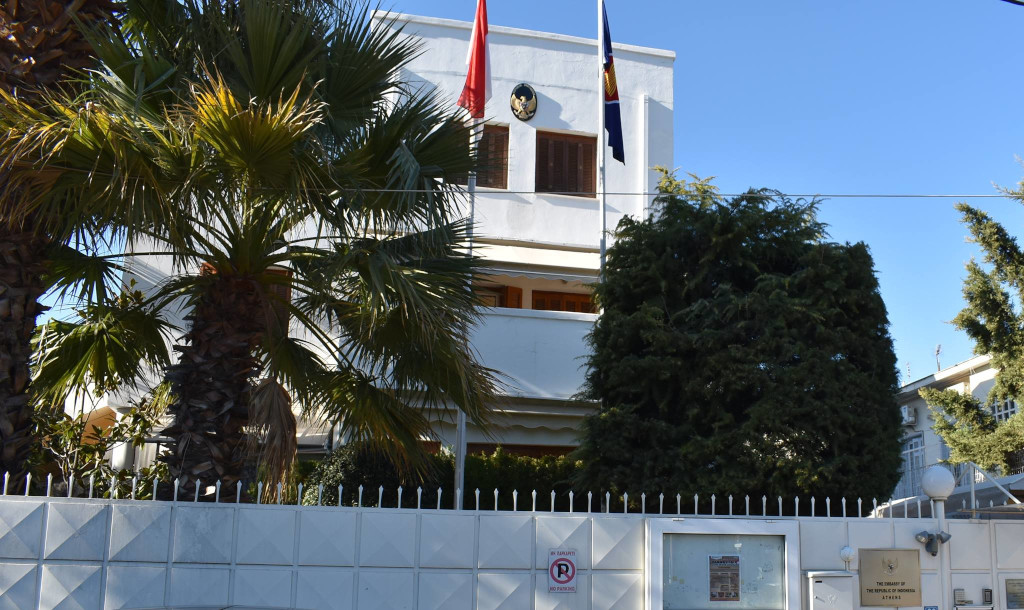
Embassy in Athens

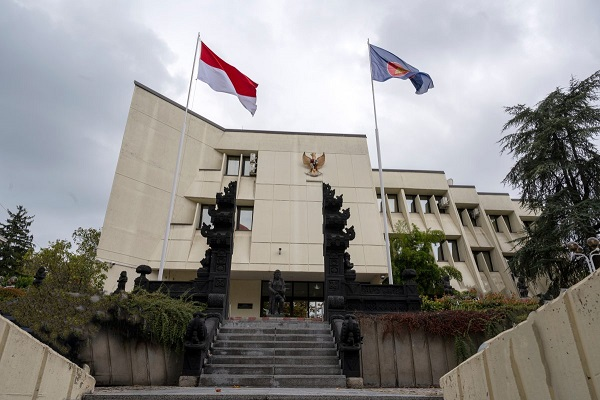
Embassy in Belgrade

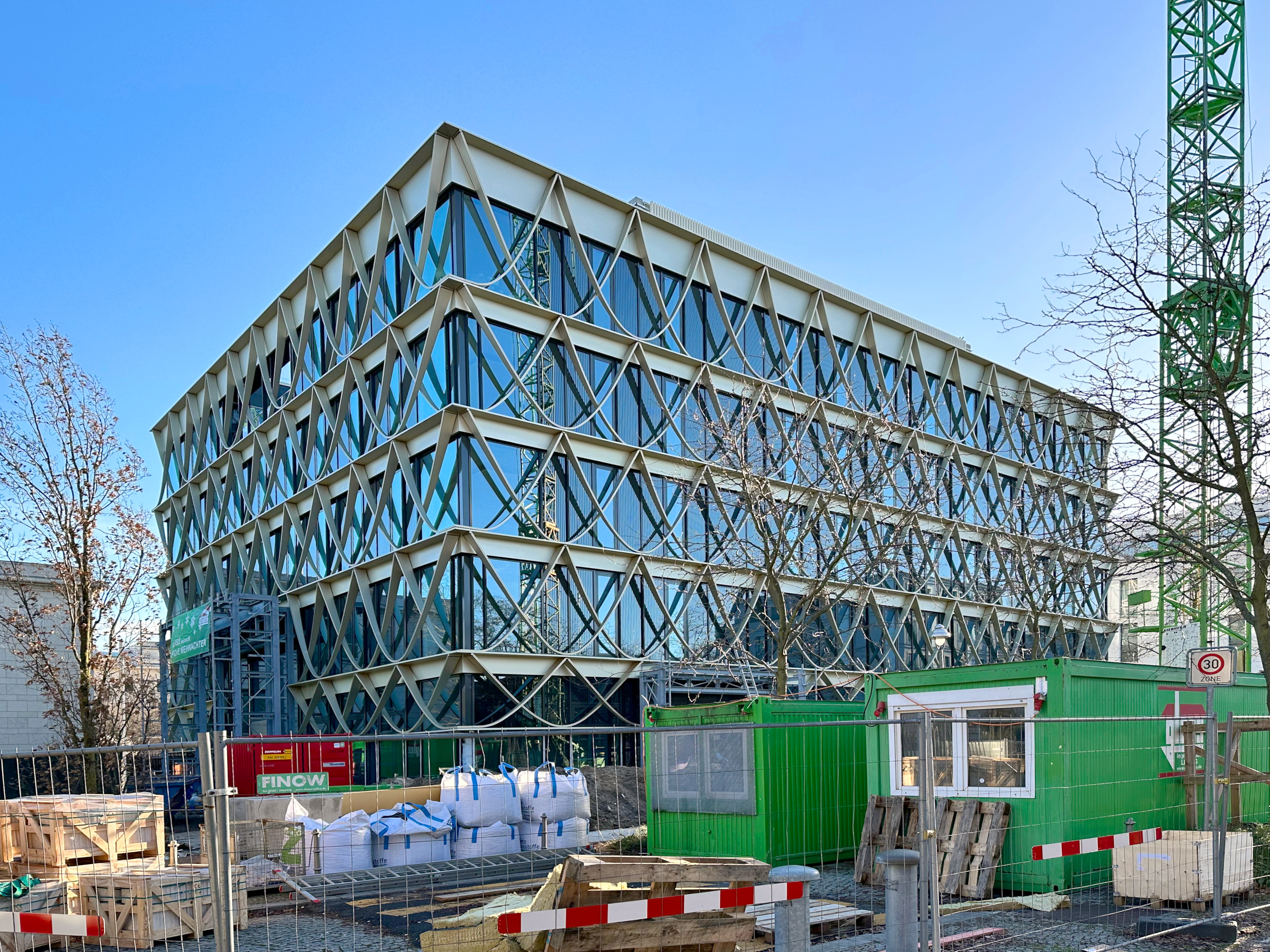
Embassy in Berlin

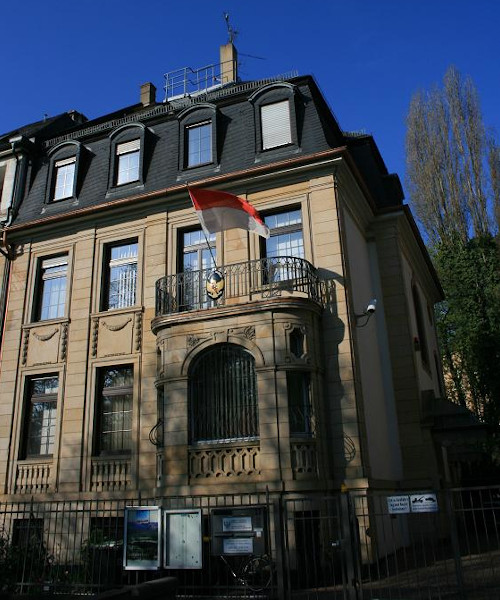
Consulate-General in Frankfurt

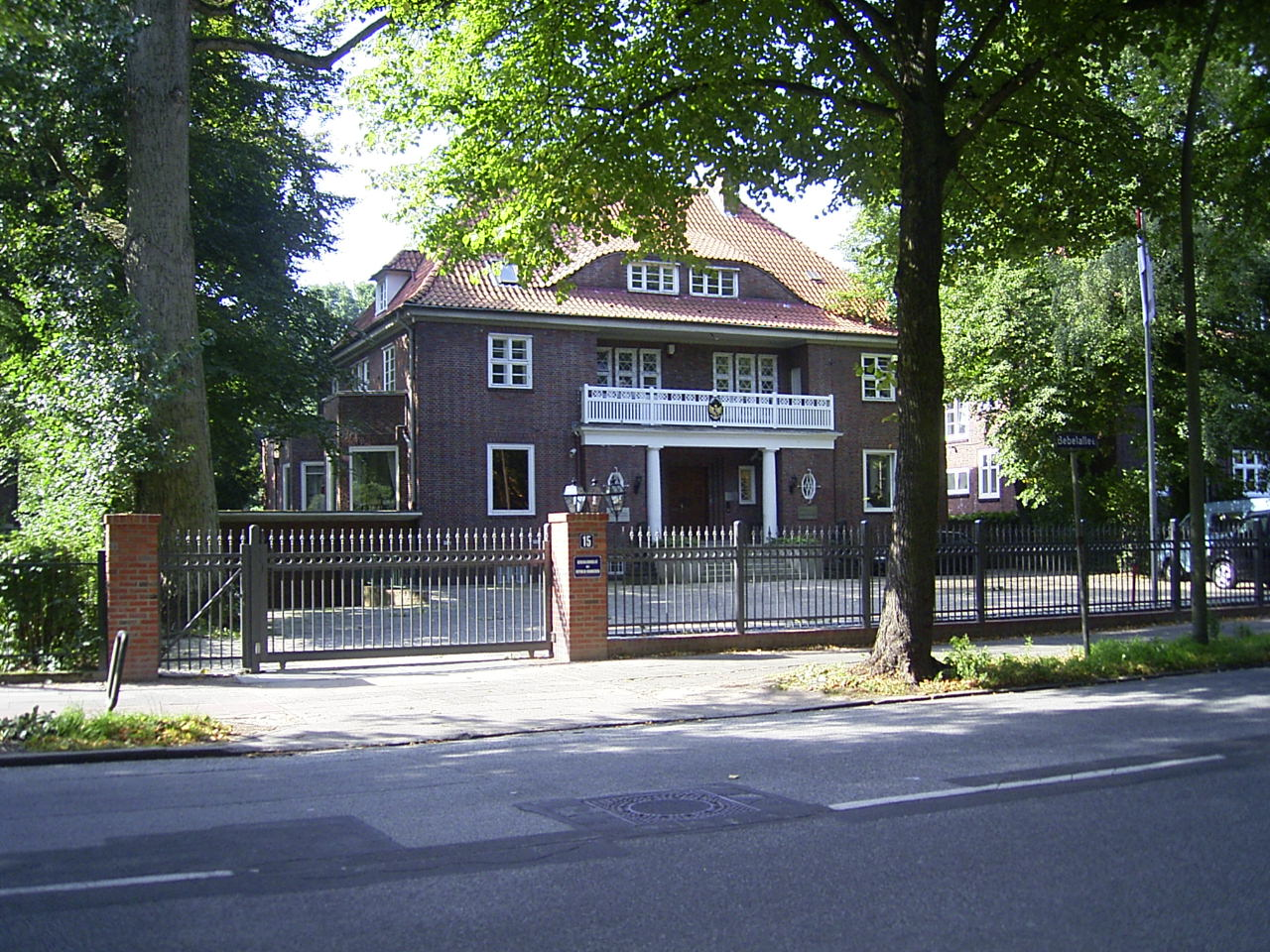
Consulate-General in Hamburg

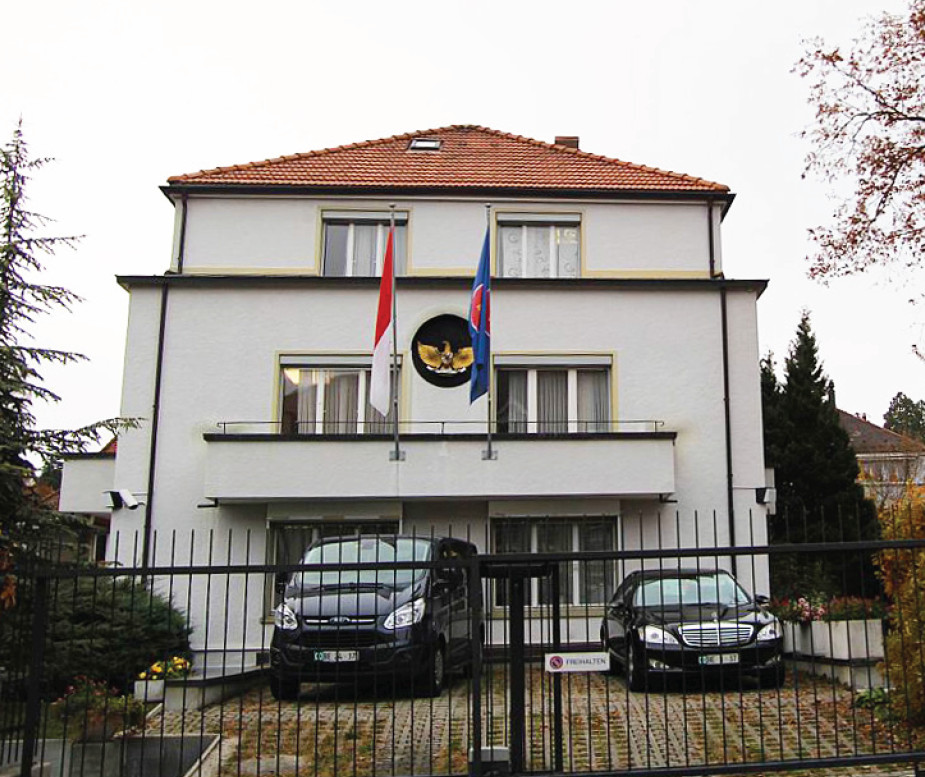
Embassy in Bern

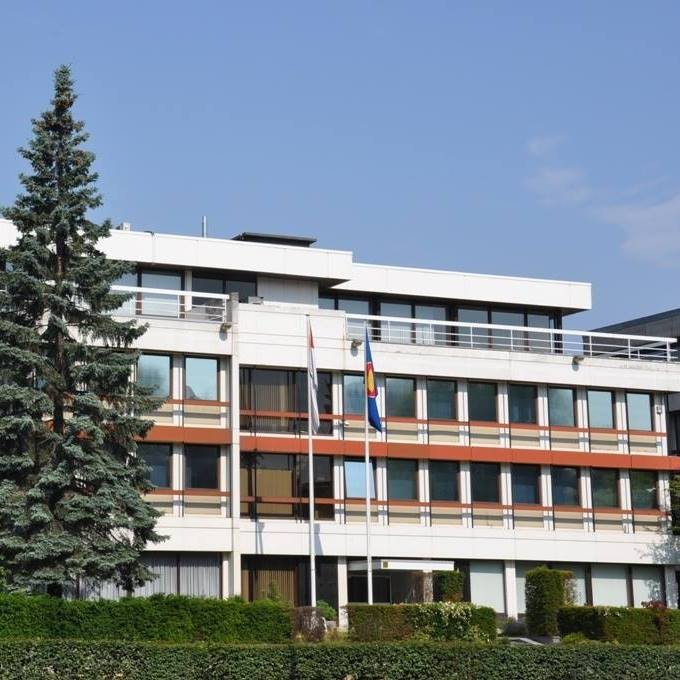
Embassy in Brussels

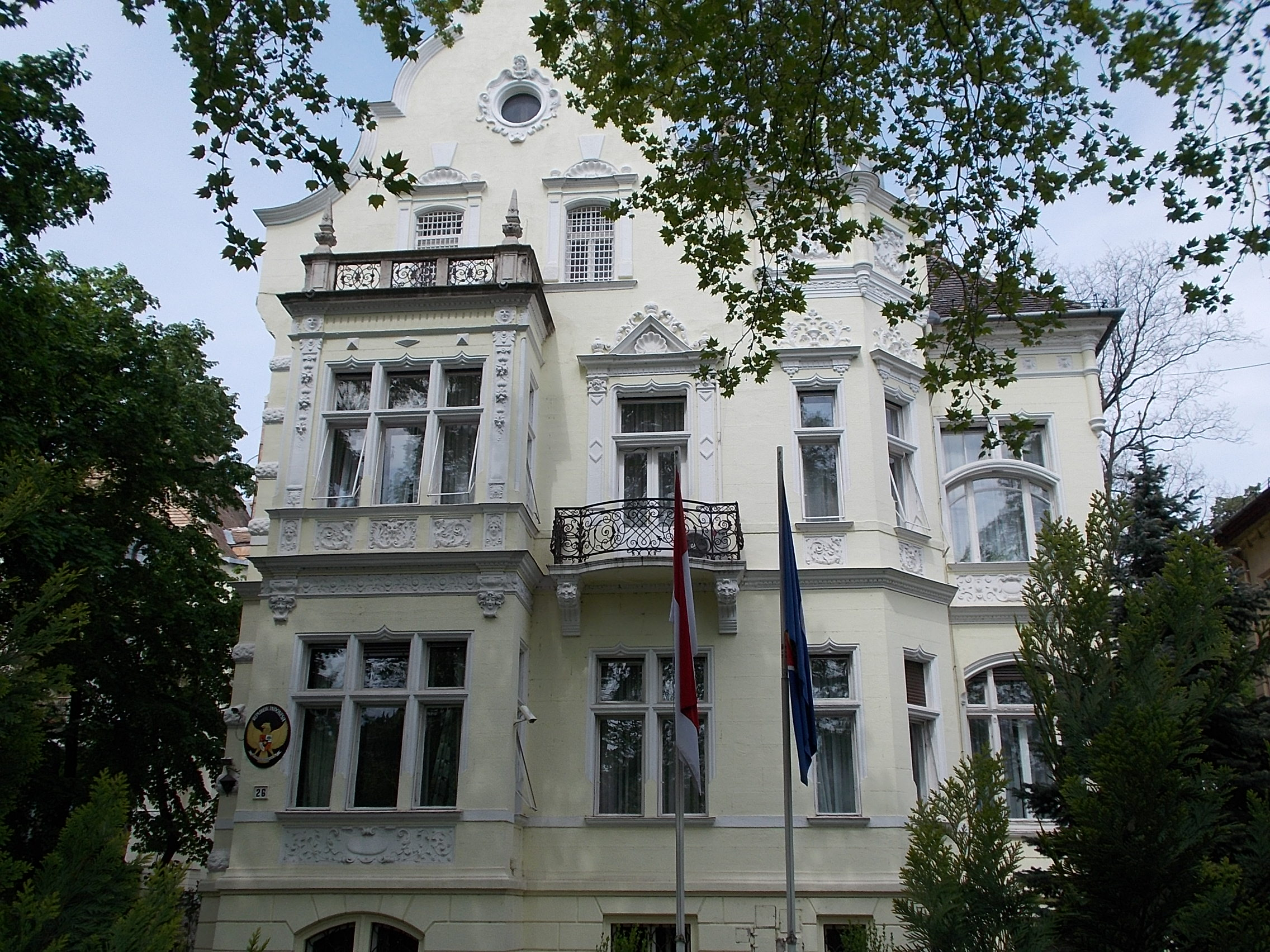
Embassy in Budapest

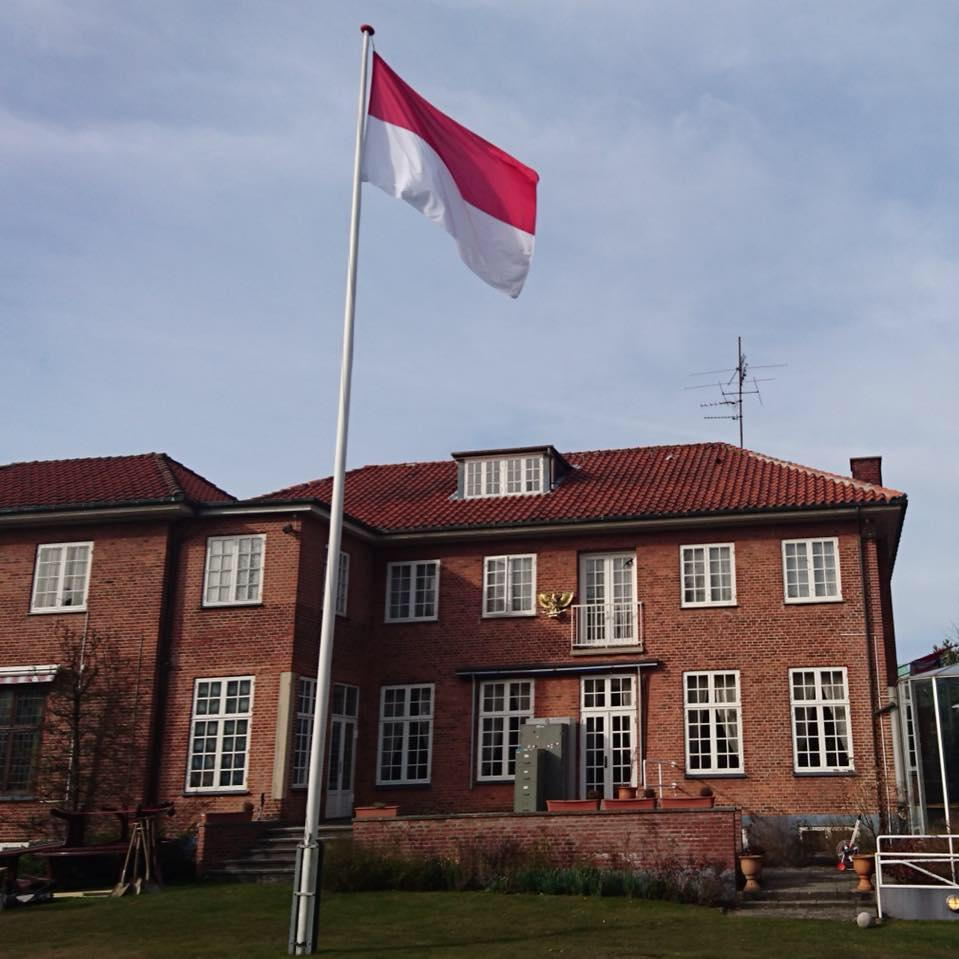
Embassy in Copenhagen

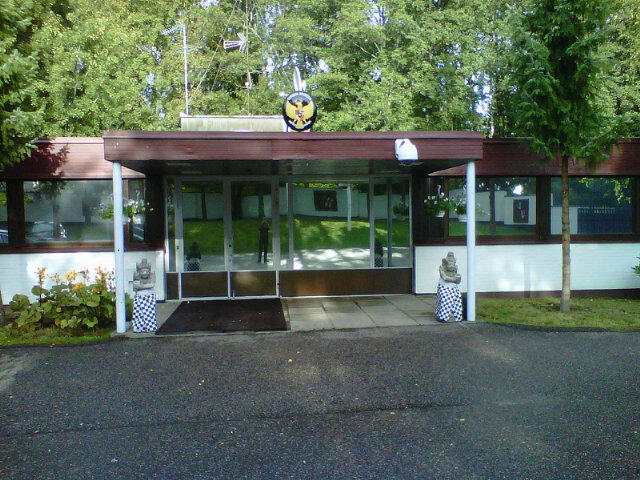
Embassy in Helsinki

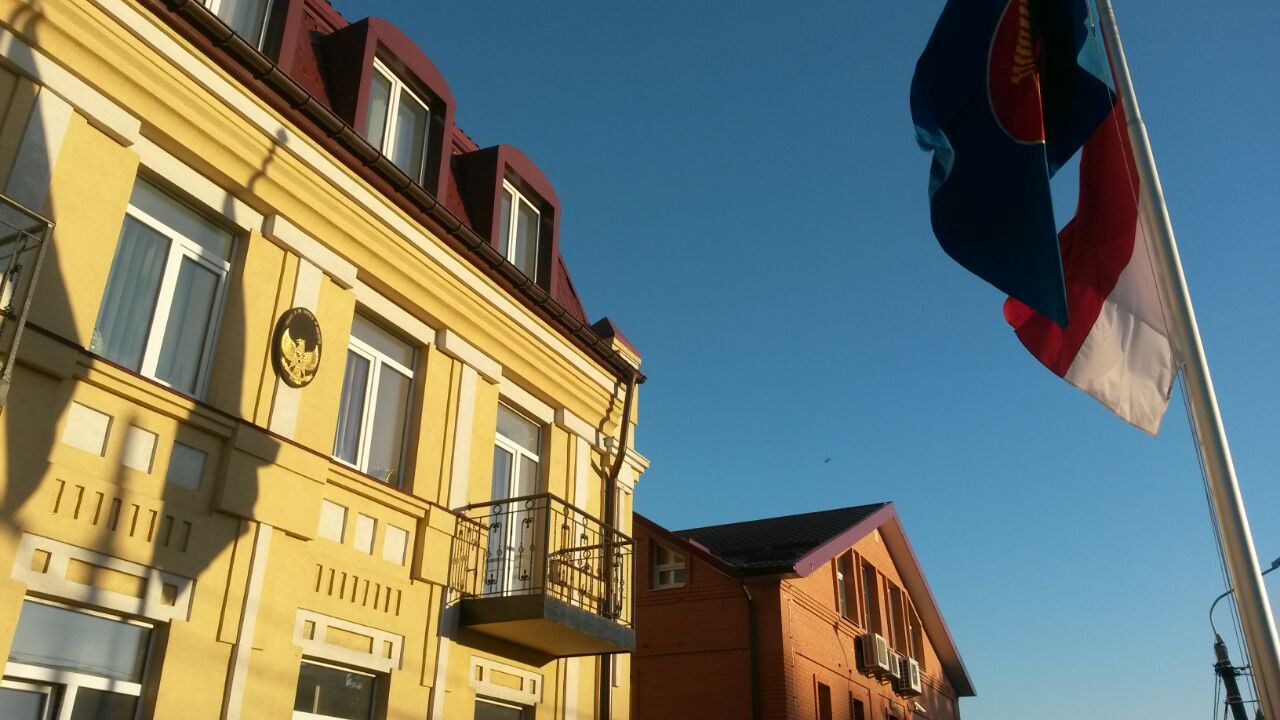
Embassy in Kyiv

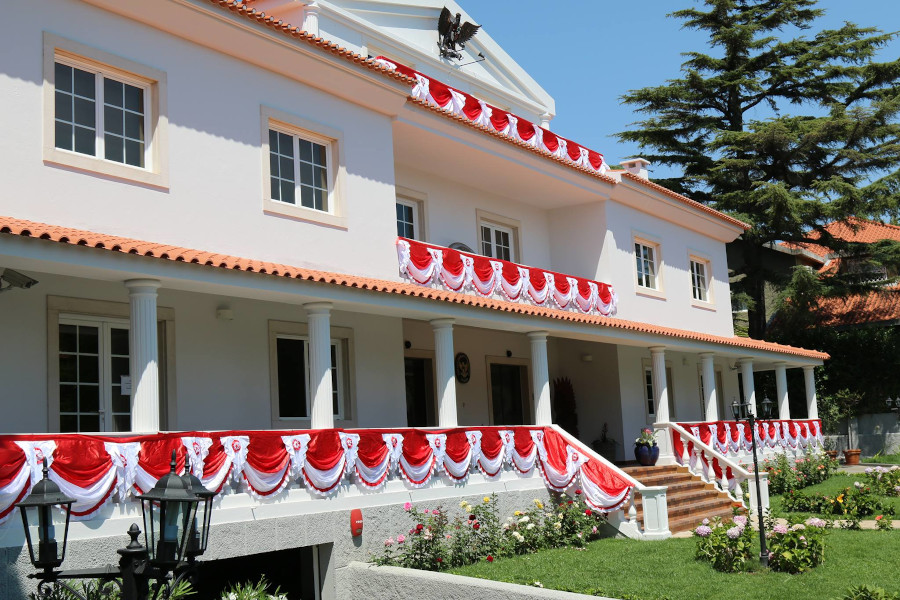
Embassy in Lisbon

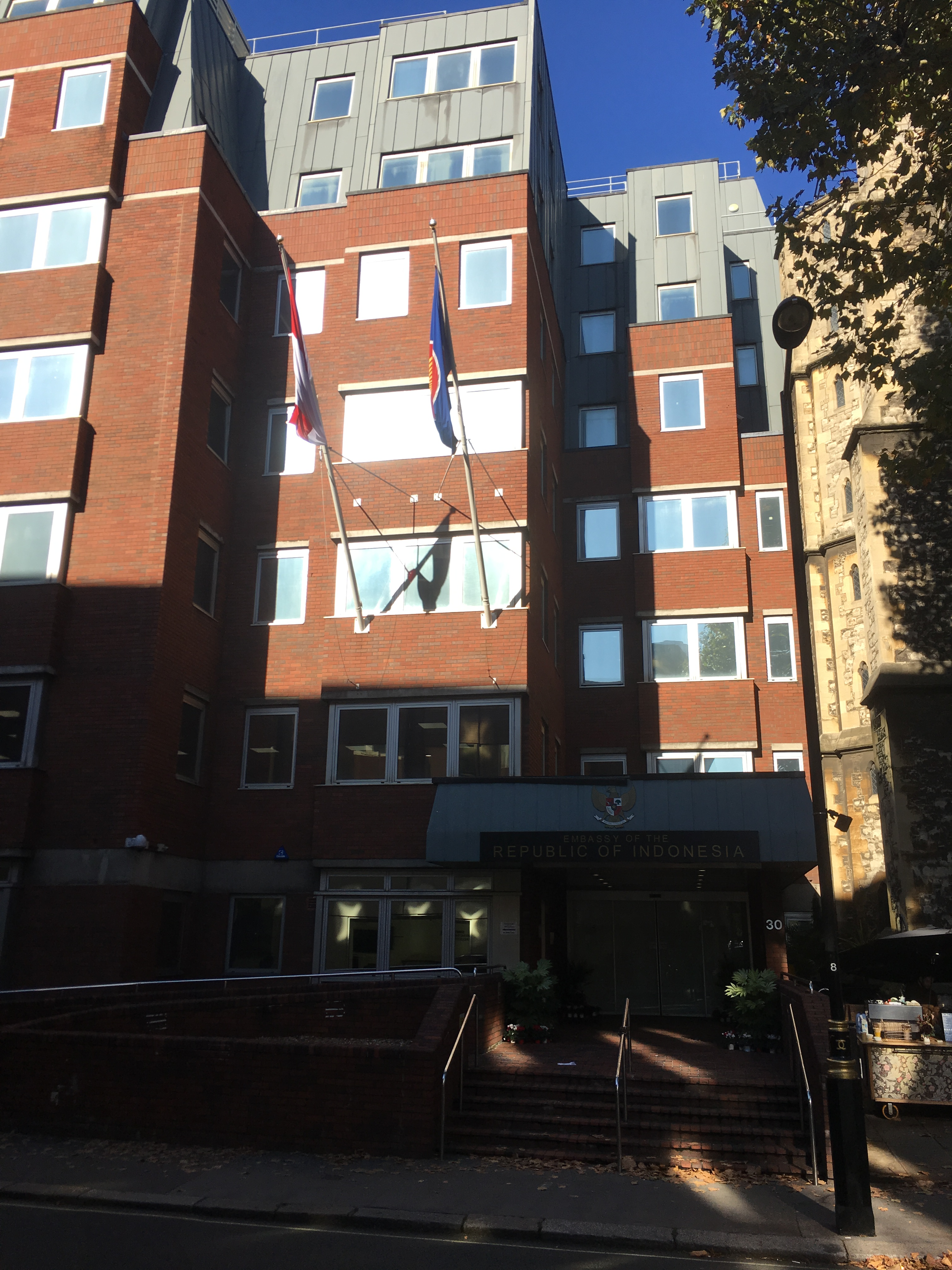
Embassy in London

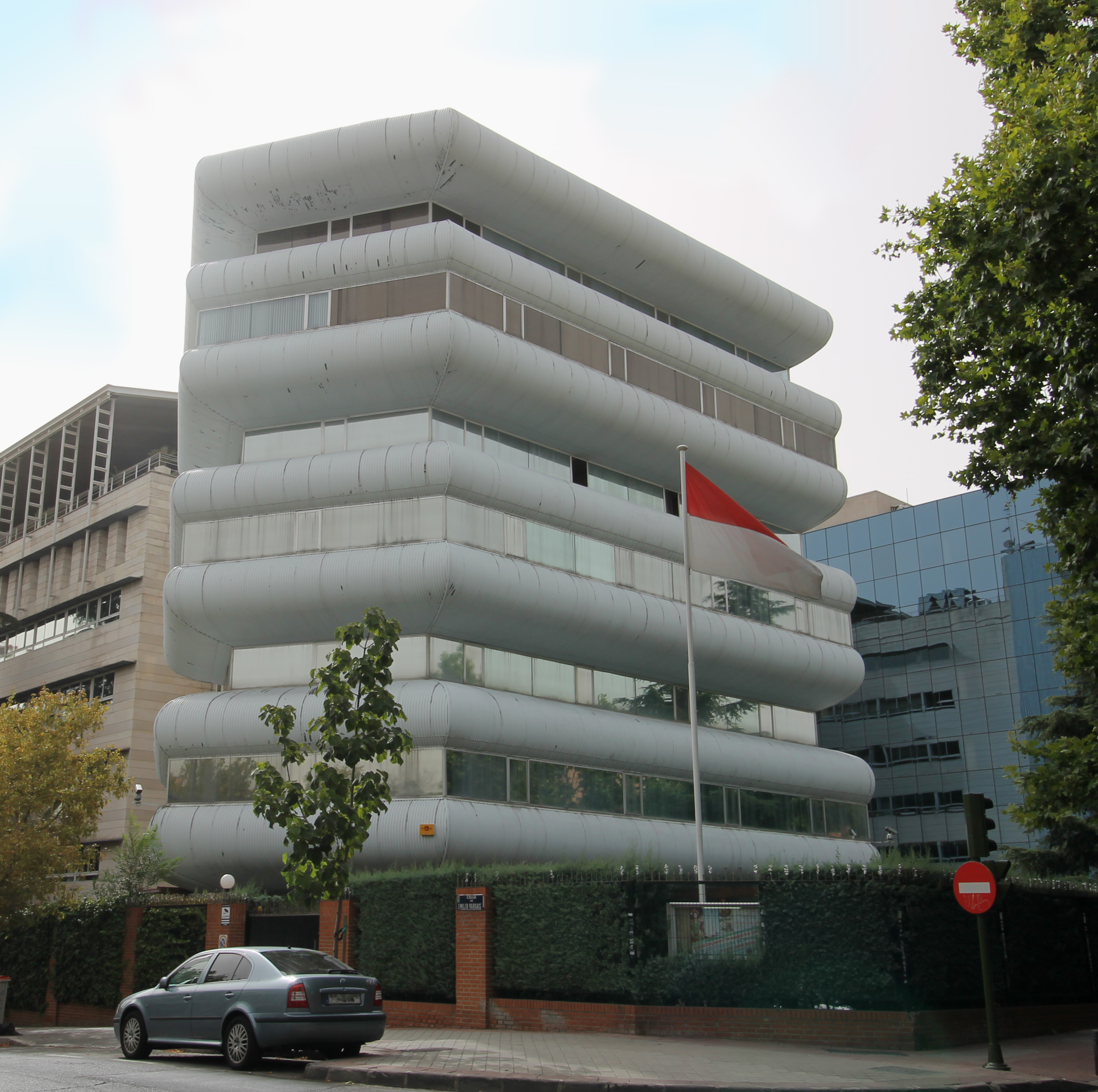
Embassy in Madrid

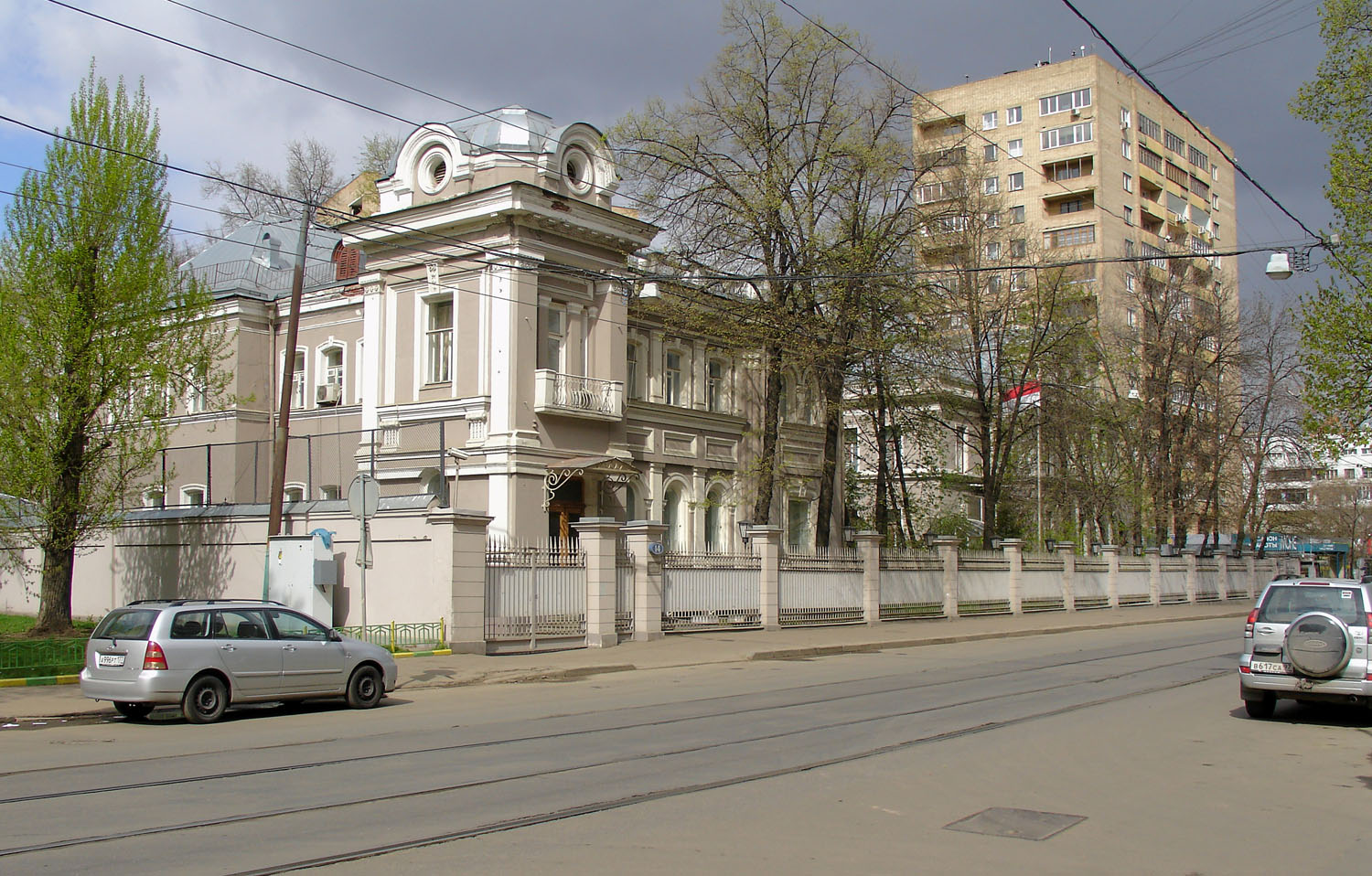
Embassy in Moscow

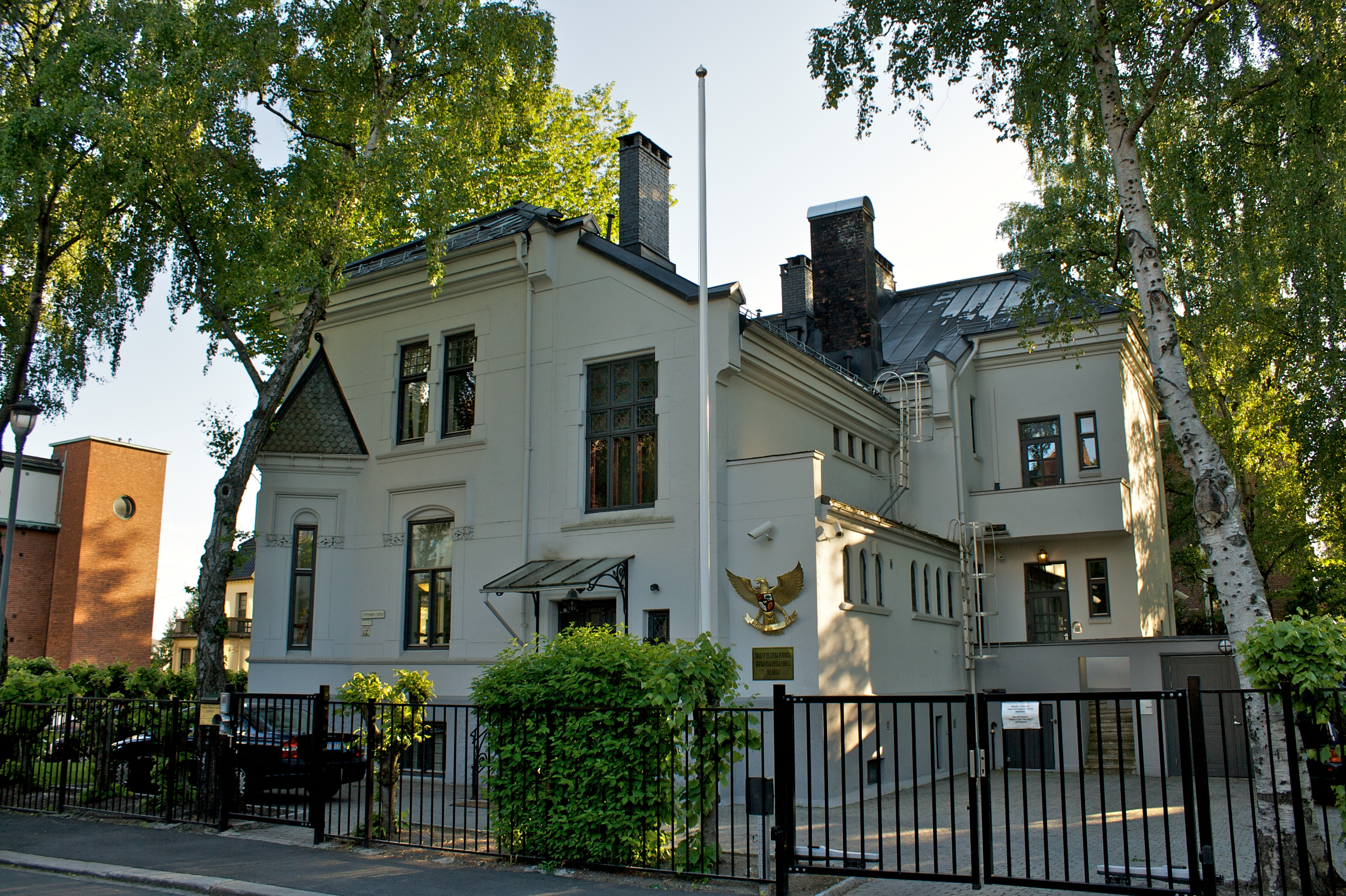
Embassy in Oslo

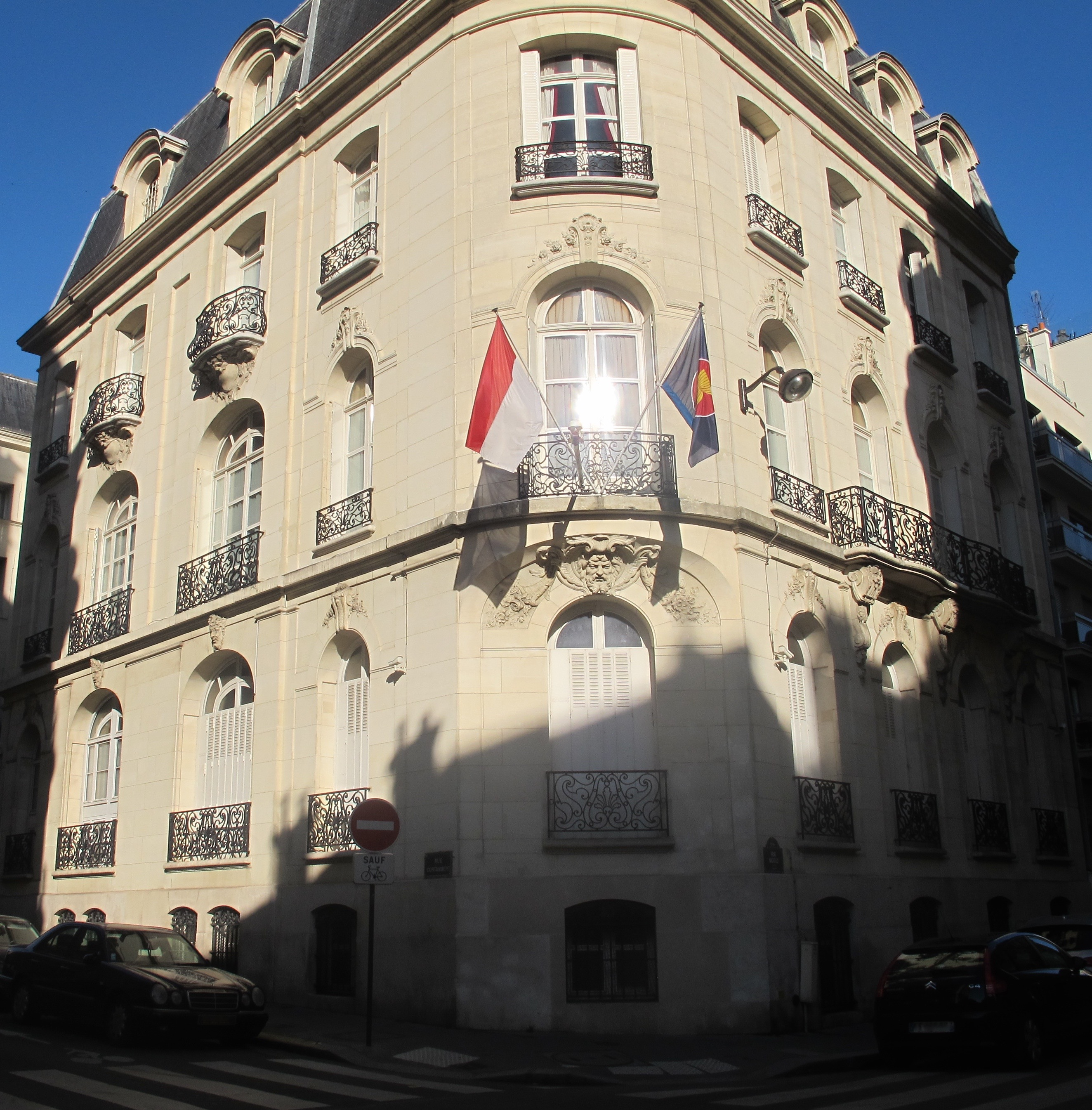
Embassy in Paris

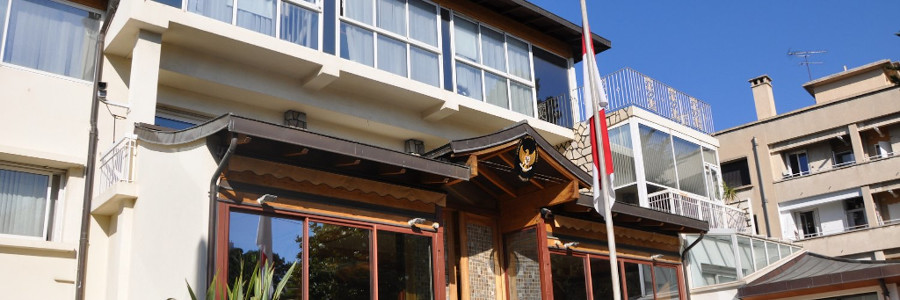
Consulate-General in Marseille

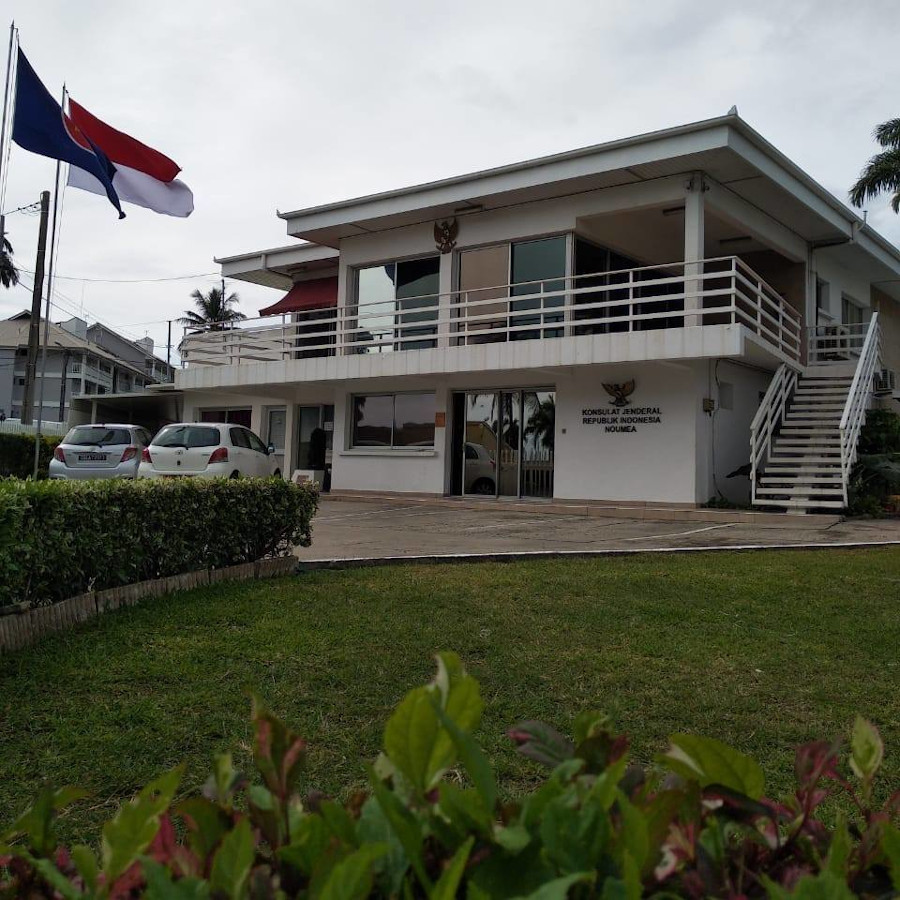
Consulate-General in Nouméa

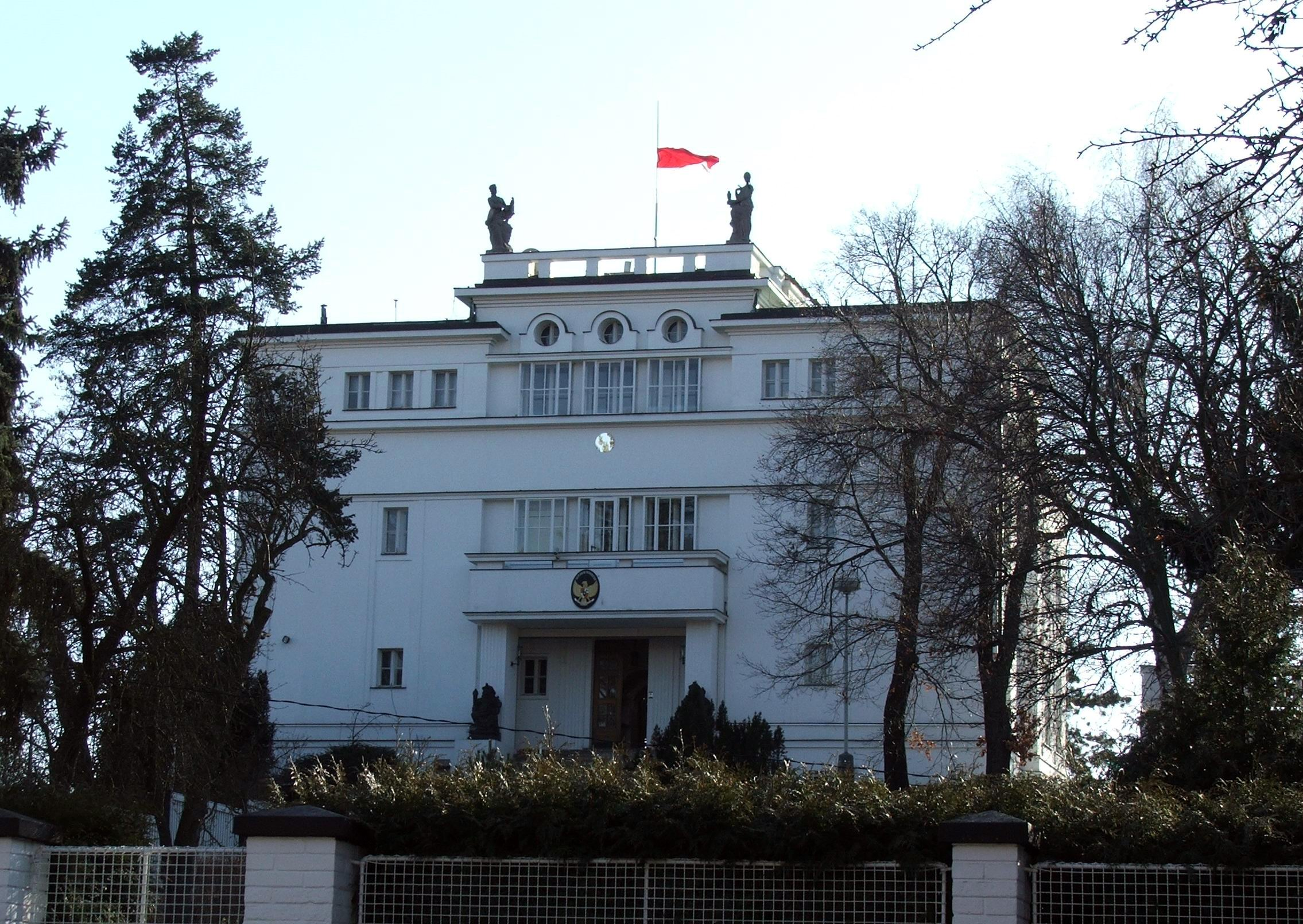
Embassy in Prague

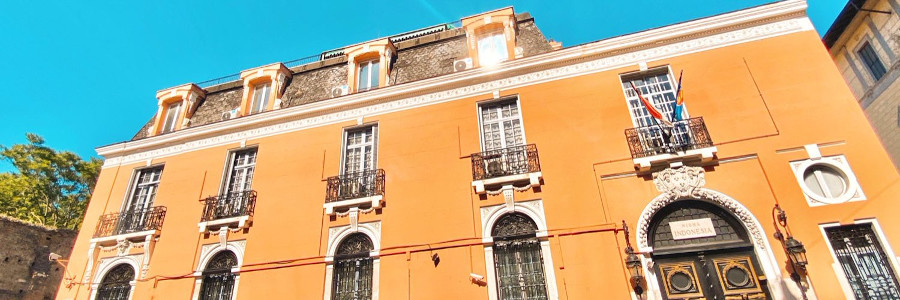
Embassy in Rome

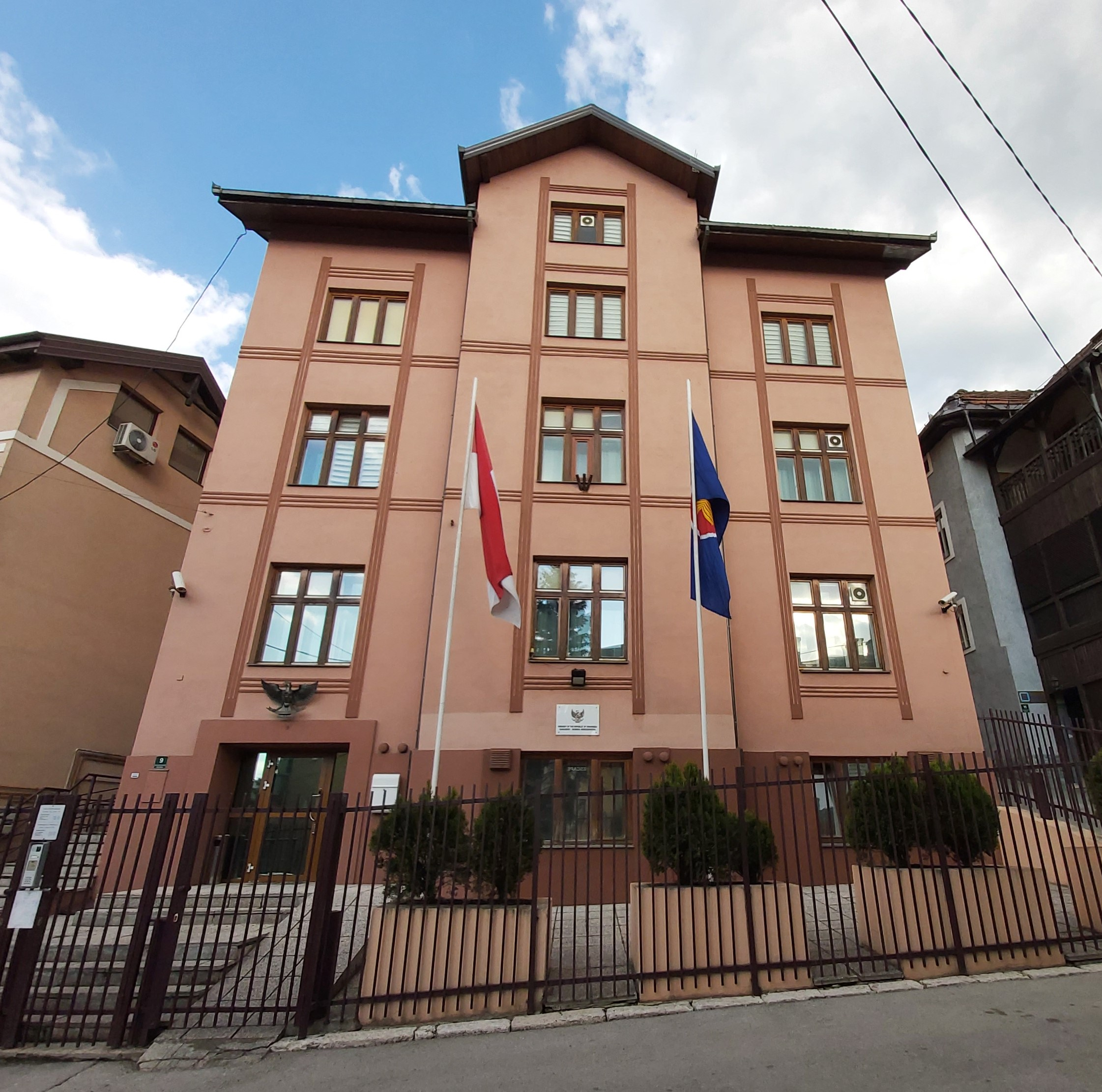
Embassy in Sarajevo

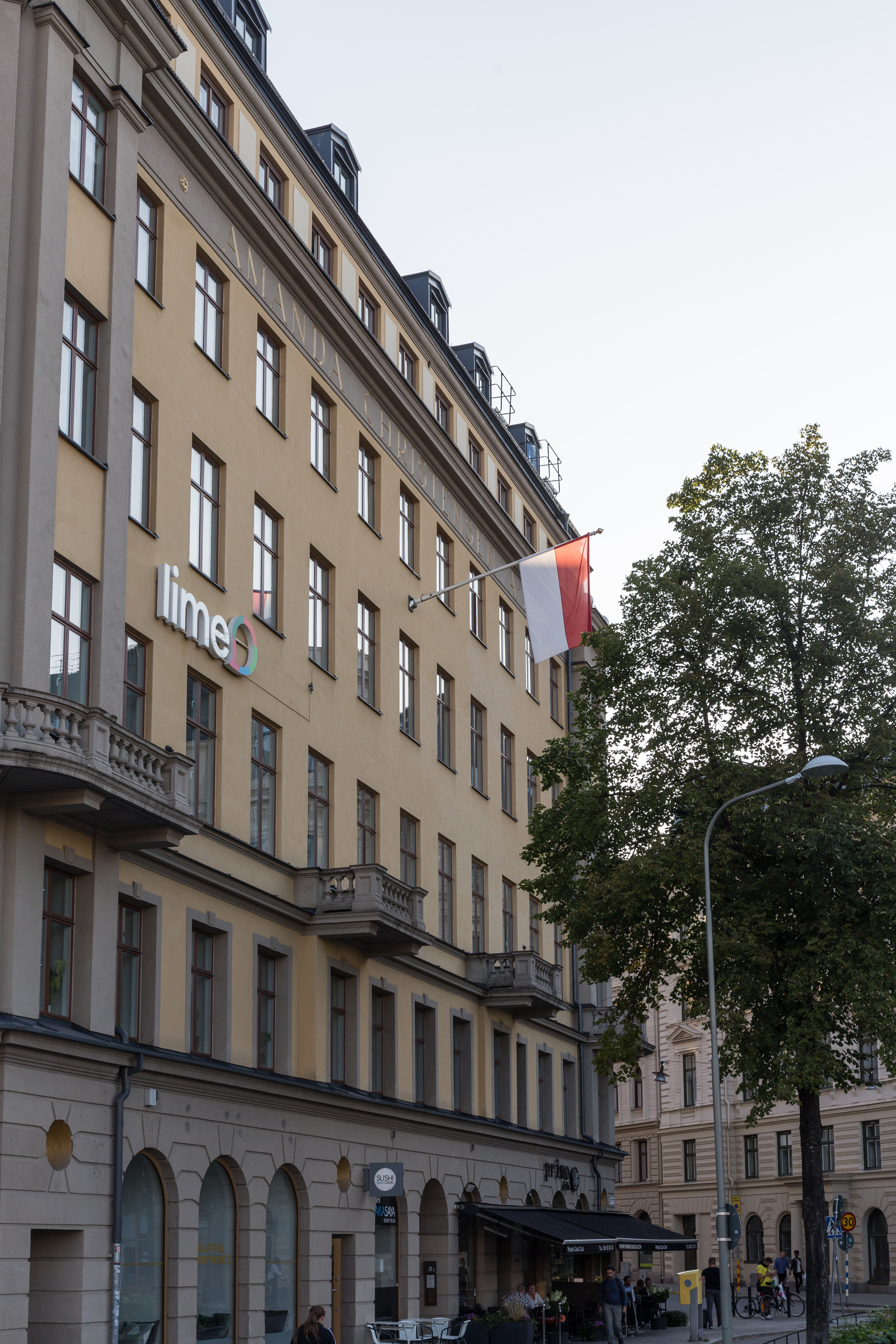
Embassy in Stockholm

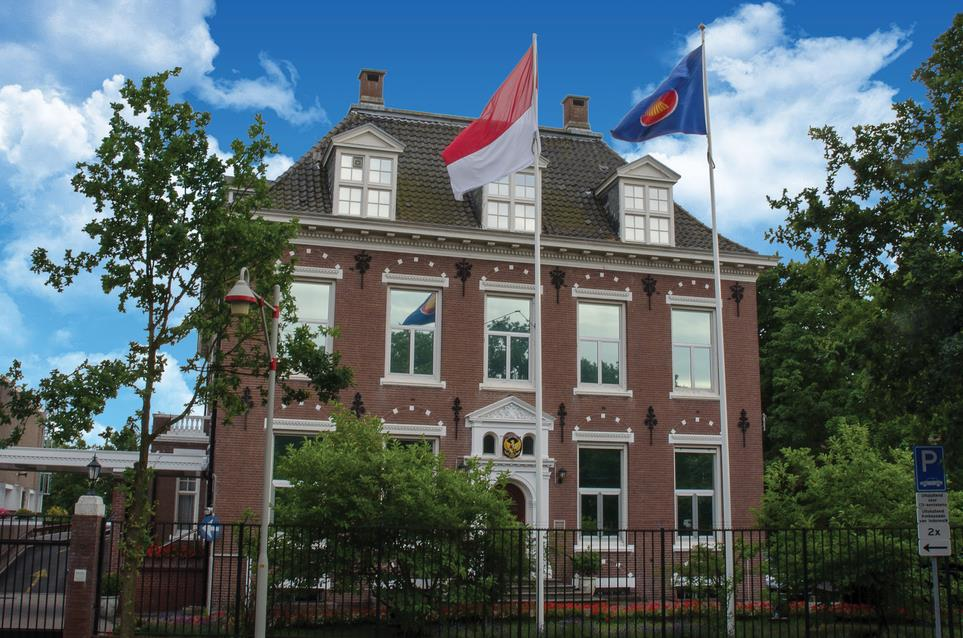
Embassy in The Hague

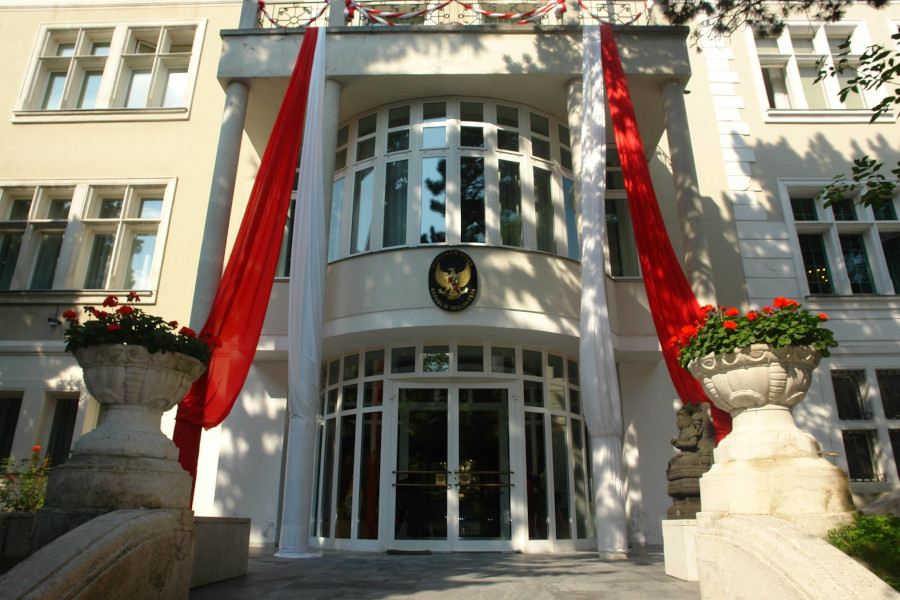
Embassy in Vienna

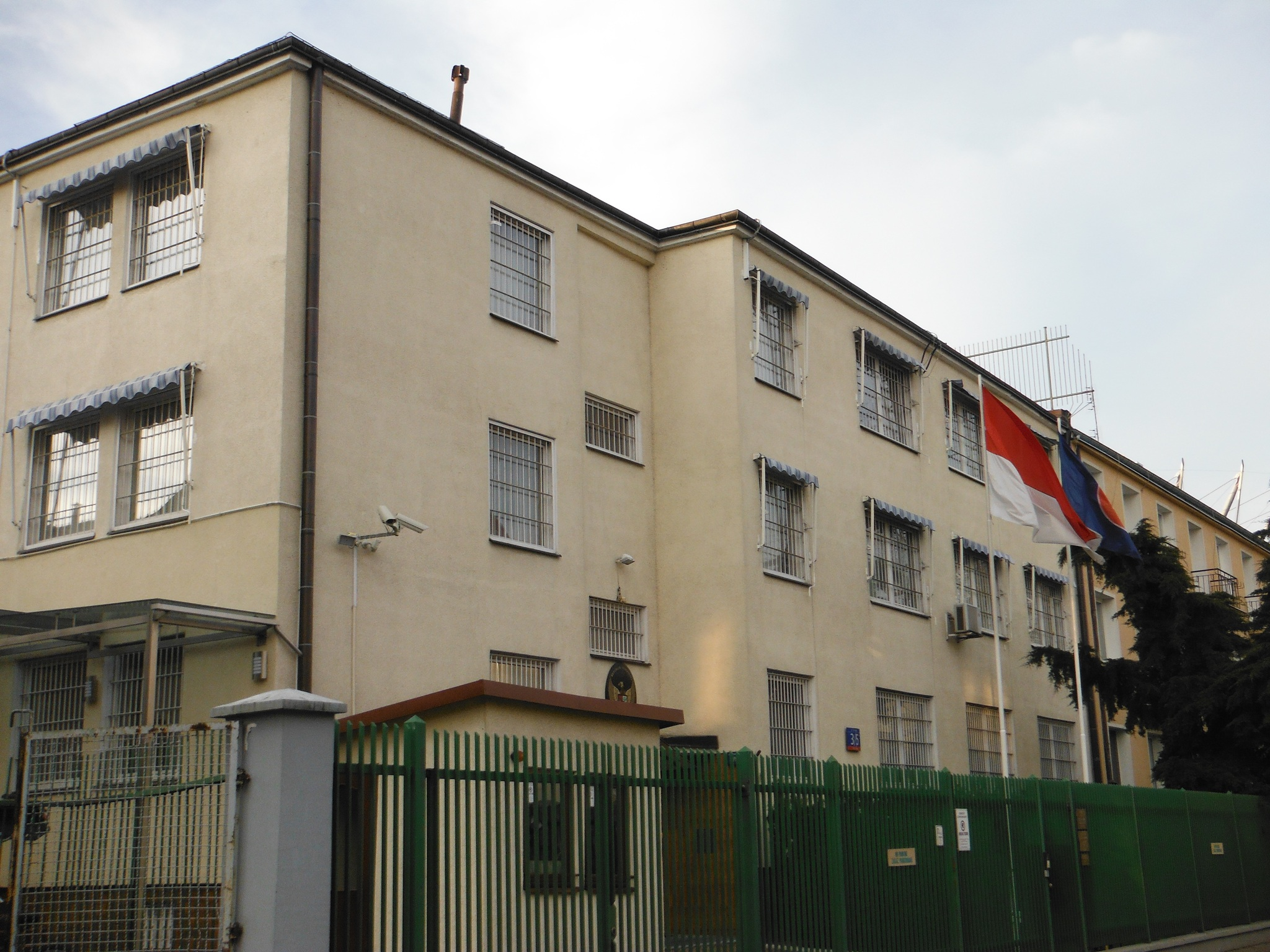
Embassy in Warsaw

=== Oceania ===
Host country	Host city	Mission level	Concurrent accreditation	Ref.
Australia	Canberra	Embassy	Countries: Vanuatu	
Australia	Melbourne	Consulate-General	Countries: Vanuatu	
Australia	Perth	Consulate-General	Countries: Vanuatu	
Australia	Sydney	Consulate-General	Countries: Vanuatu	
Australia	Darwin	Consulate	Countries: Vanuatu	
Fiji	Suva	Embassy	Countries: Kiribati; Nauru; Tuvalu	
New Zealand	Wellington	Embassy	Countries: Cook Islands; Niue; Samoa; Tonga	
Papua New Guinea	Port Moresby	Embassy	Countries: Solomon Islands	
Papua New Guinea	Vanimo	Consulate	Countries: Solomon Islands	

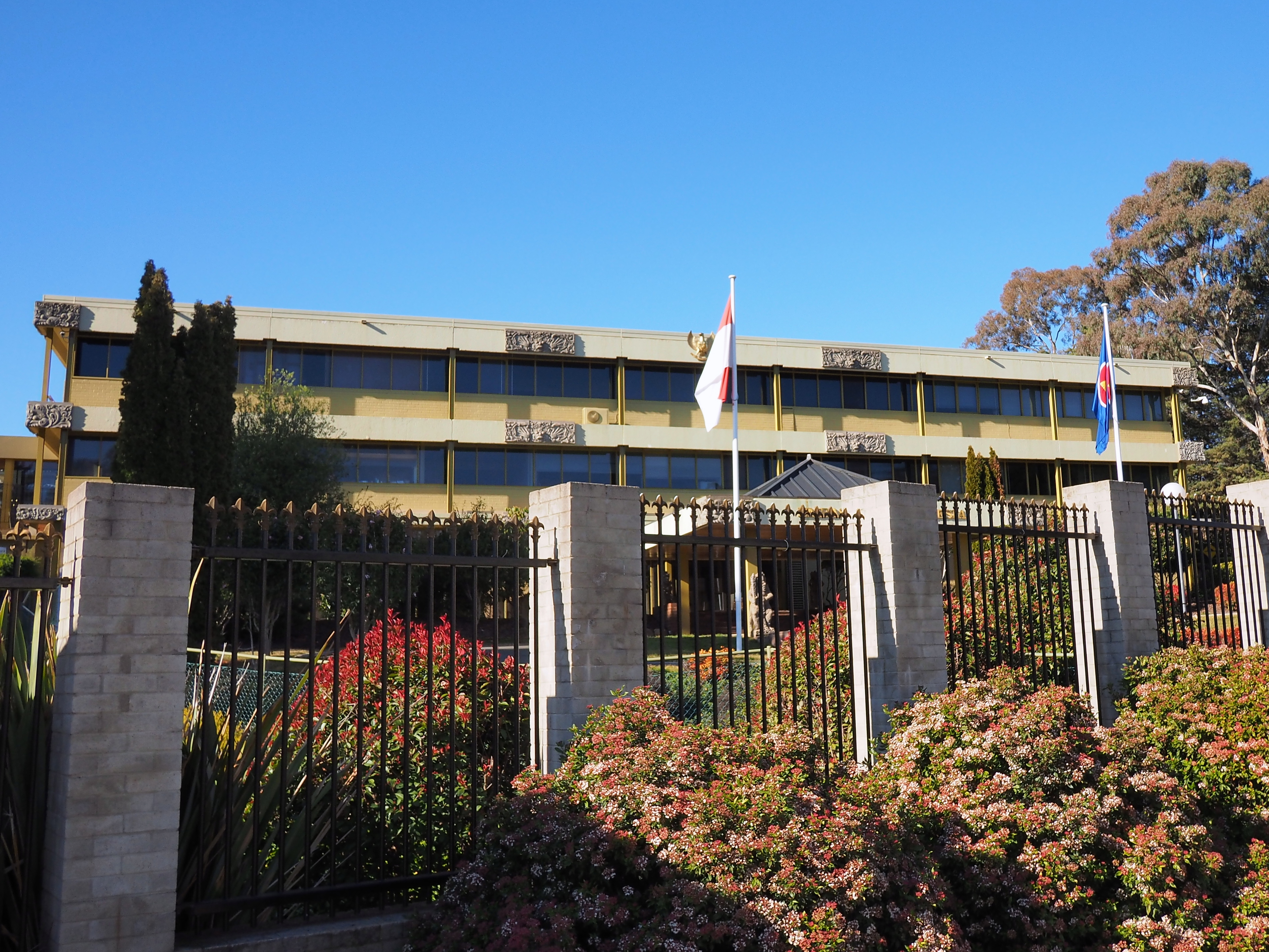
Embassy in Canberra

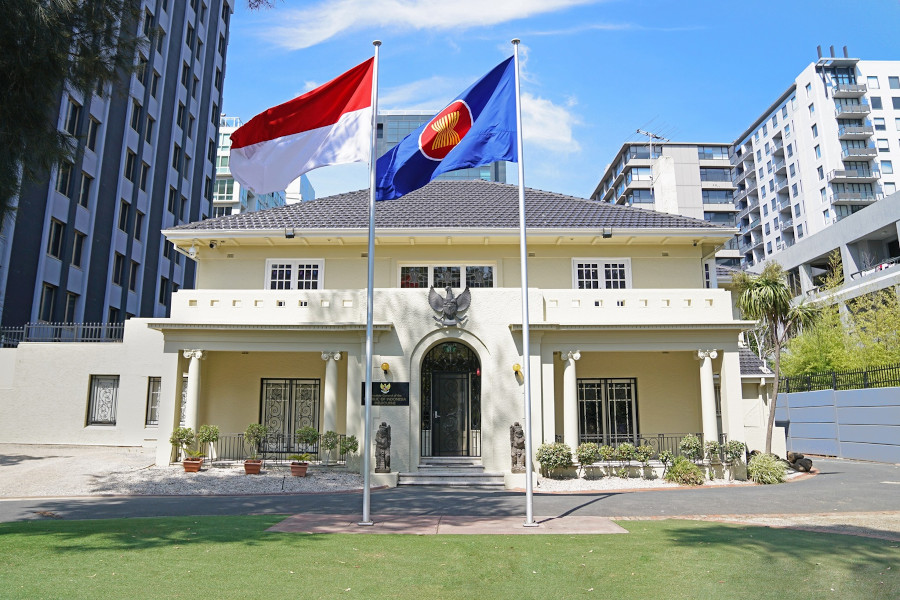
Consulate-General in Melbourne

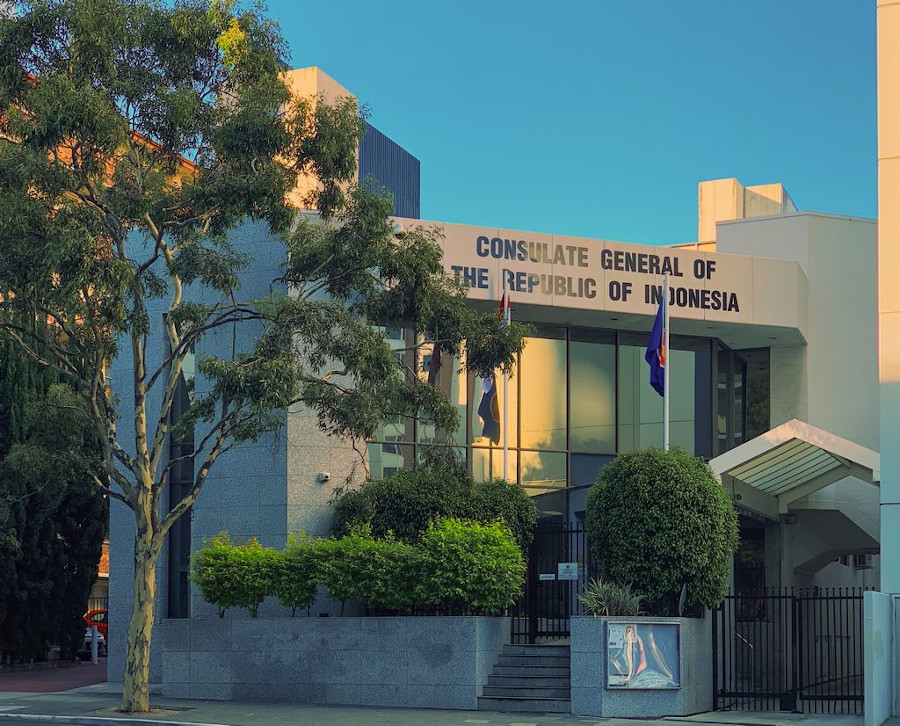
Consulate-General in Perth

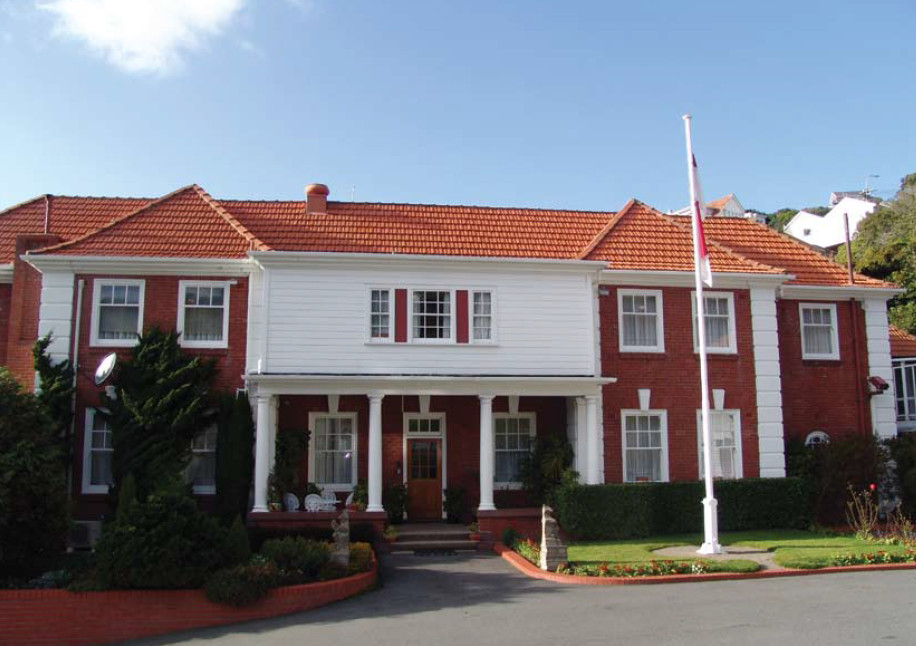
Embassy in Wellington

=== Multilateral organizations ===
Organization	Host city	Host country	Mission	Concurrent accreditation	Ref.
Association of Southeast Asian Nations	Jakarta	Indonesia	Permanent Mission		
United Nations	New York City	United States	Permanent Mission	Multilateral Organizations: International Seabed Authority	
United Nations	Geneva	Switzerland	Permanent Mission	Multilateral Organizations: World Trade Organization	

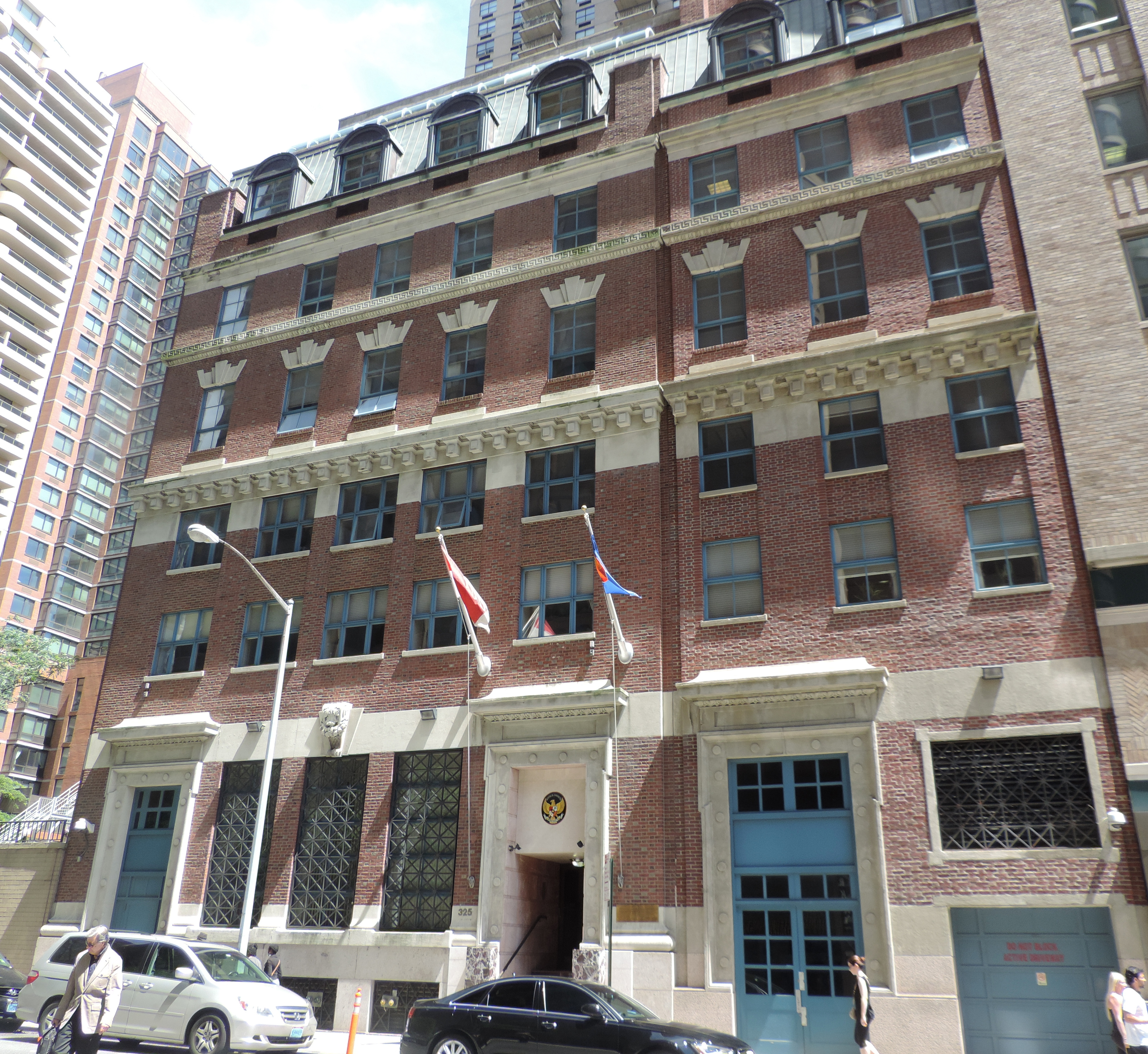
Permanent Mission in New York City

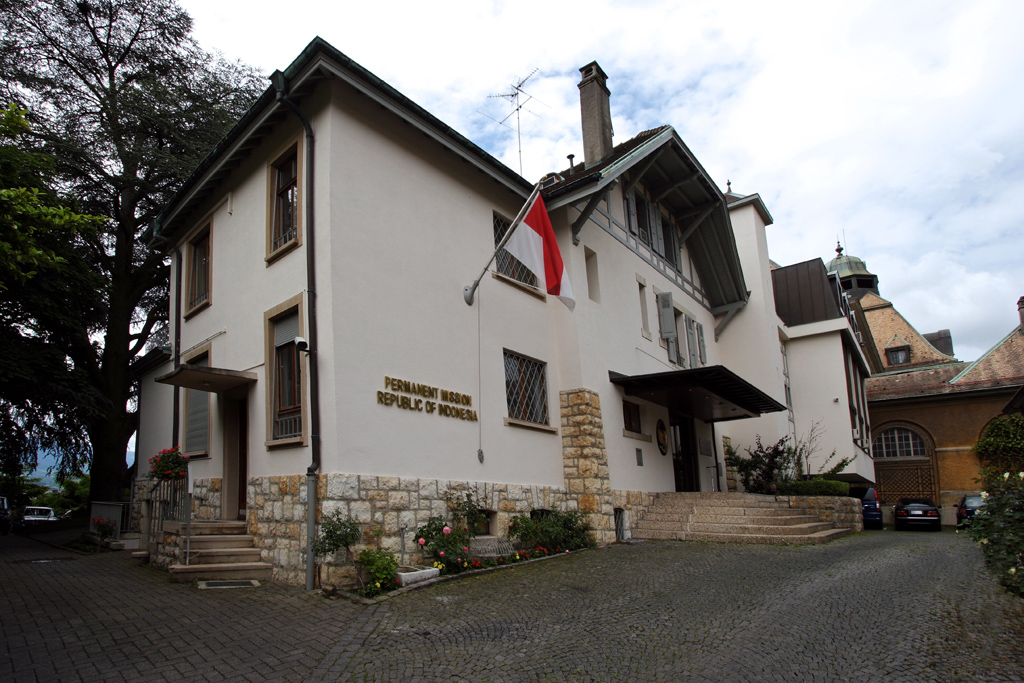
Permanent Mission in Geneva

== Closed missions ==
=== Africa ===
Host country	Host city	Mission	Year closed	Ref.
Ghana	Accra	Embassy	1967	
Guinea	Conakry	Embassy	1973	
Somali Republic	Mogadishu	Embassy	1967	

=== Asia ===
Host country	Host city	Mission	Year closed	Ref.
Kingdom of Nepal	Kathmandu	Embassy	1967	
Yemen	Sana'a	Embassy	2019	
Japan	Kobe	Consulate-General	1995	

=== Europe ===
Host country	Host city	Mission	Year closed	Ref.
Netherlands	Amsterdam	Consulate-General	1976	
Germany	Bonn	Consulate	2003	

== Missions to open ==
Host country	Host city	Mission	Ref.
Malaysia	Putrajaya	Embassy	
Tajikistan	Dushanbe	Embassy	
China	Chengdu	Consulate-General	

== See also ==
- Foreign relations of Indonesia
- List of Indonesian ambassadors
- List of diplomatic missions in Indonesia
- Visa policy of Indonesia
