= Ethiopian passport =

Travel document issued to citizens of Ethiopia

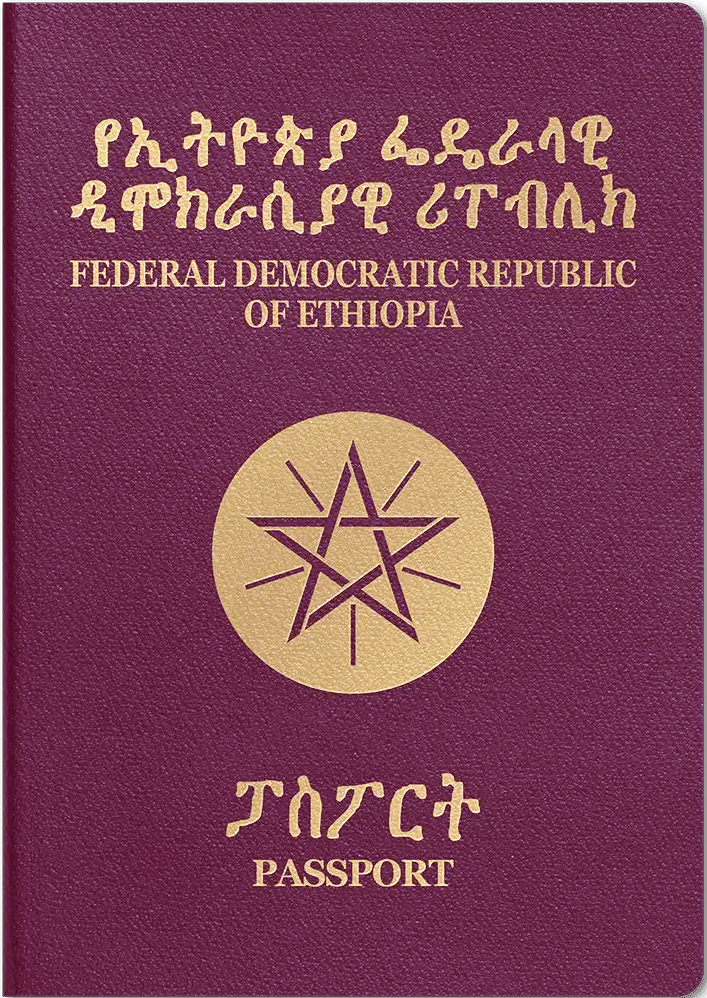
- Image of Ethiopian passport
- Type: Passport
- Issued by: Ethiopia
- Purpose: Identification
- Eligibility: Ethiopian citizenship

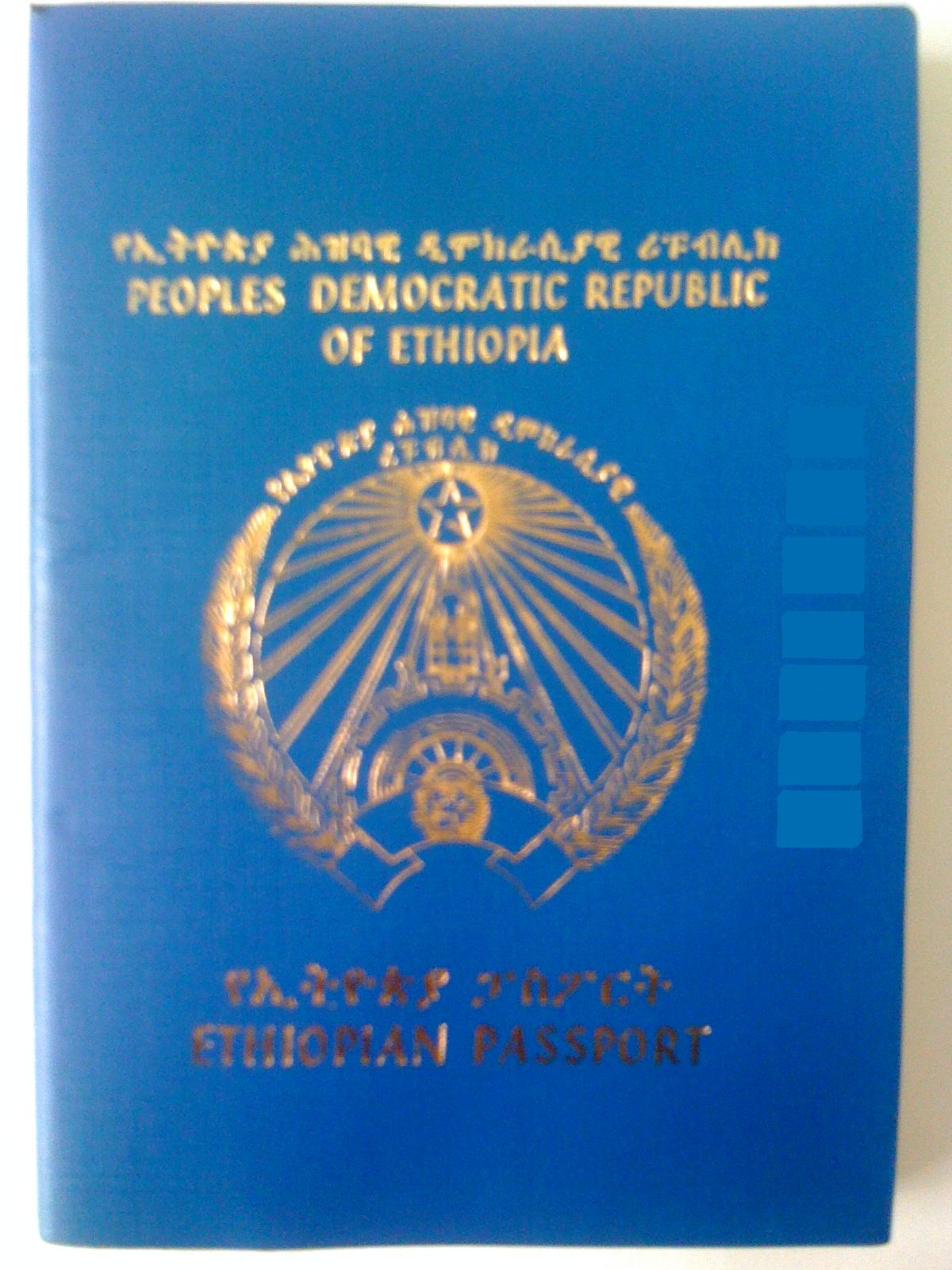
The front cover of a passport from the era of the People's Democratic Republic of Ethiopia.

The Ethiopian passport (Note: Amharic: የኢትዮጵያ ፓስፖርት; Pereet ኮድOromo: Phaaspoortii Itiyoophiyaa; Somali: Baasaboorka Itoobiya; Tigrinya: ፓስፖርት ኢትዮጵያ; Afar: Itiyoppiya Passapoori) is a identity document issued to citizens of Ethiopia to facilitate international travel. Ethiopian passports are valid for worldwide travel and facilitate the access to consular services whilst abroad.

The document is a biometric machine-readable passport with a burgundy cover with the text "Federal Democratic Republic of Ethiopia" above the coat of arms, and the text "passport" below it in Amharic and English. The passport is valid for 5 years and contains 64 pages.

== History ==
Nelson Mandela was clandestinely issued an Ethiopian passport in 1961. He used it to travel around the world until his arrest. He never obtained a South African passport from the Apartheid regime until February 19, 1990 – eight days after he was released from 27 years in jail.

In 2025, biometric passports contracted with Toppan Security Ethiopia began being issued, with a full release starting in October.

== Visa requirements ==
As of 2024, Ethiopian citizens had visa-free or visa on arrival access to 47 countries and territories, ranking the Ethiopian passport 93rd globally according to the Henley passport index.

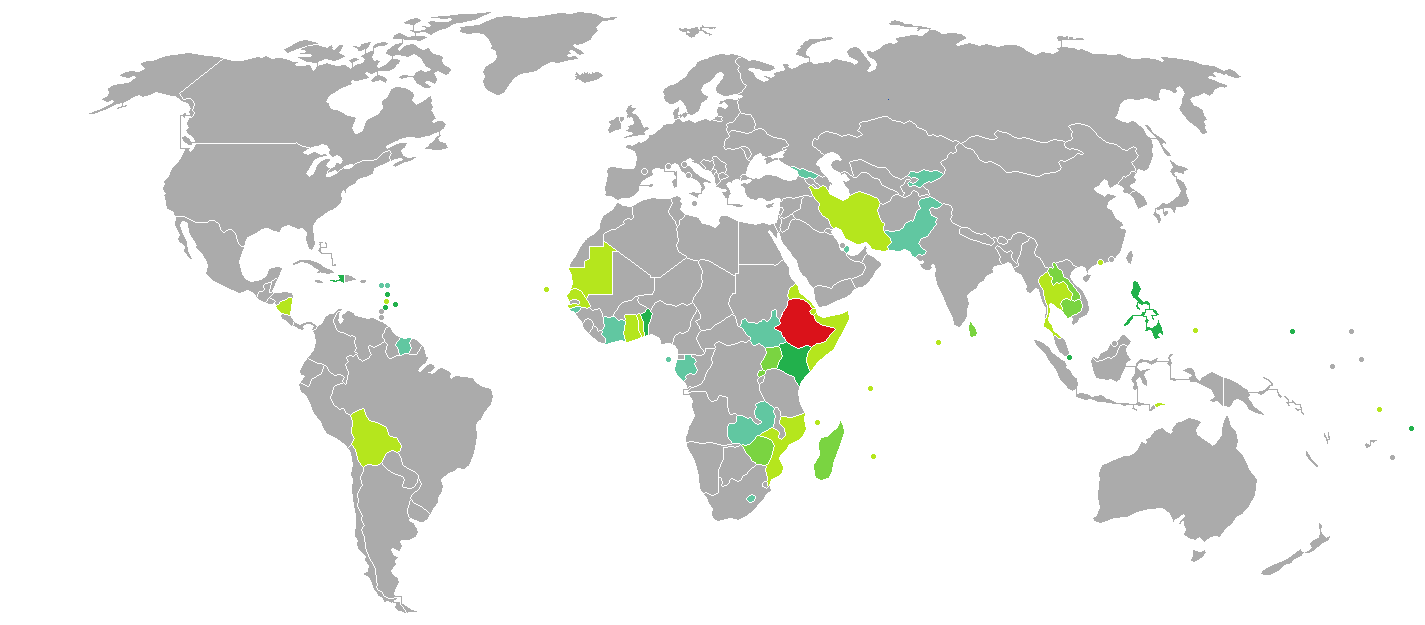
Ethiopia Visa free access Visa on arrival eVisa Visa required

== See also ==
- Visa requirements for Ethiopian citizens
- Ethiopian Origin ID Card
