= Embassy of Indonesia, Addis Ababa =

Embassy of the Republic of Indonesia in Addis Ababa Kedutaan Besar Republik Indonesia di Addis Ababa

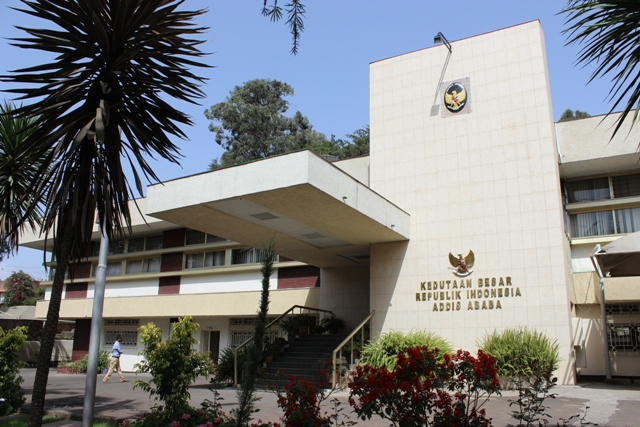
- Location: Addis Ababa, Ethiopia
- Address: Egypt Street, Higher 23 Kebele 13 House No. 1816; Addis Ababa, Etiopia
- Coordinates: 8.988088°N 38.737083°E
- Ambassador: Faizal Chery Sidharta
- Jurisdiction: Ethiopia; Djibouti; Eritrea; African Union
- Website: kemlu.go.id/addisababa/en

The Embassy of the Republic of Indonesia in Addis Ababa (Indonesian: Kedutaan Besar Republik Indonesia di Addis Ababa) (Amharic: የኢንዶኔዥያ ኤምባሲ አዲስ) is the diplomatic mission of the Republic of Indonesia to the Federal Democratic Republic of Ethiopia. The embassy is concurrently accredited to the Republic of Djibouti. In addition, the ambassador serves as the Indonesian representative for the African Union. The first Indonesian ambassador to Ethiopia was Suadi Soeromiharjo (1964–1968). The current ambassador, Faizal Chery Sidharta, was appointed by President Prabowo Subianto on 24 March 2025.

== History ==
Diplomatic relations between Indonesia and Ethiopia were established in 1961. Afterwards, the Indonesian embassy in Addis Ababa opened on 20 October 1964. Initially, the embassy staff rented offices, however, on 6 May 1966, construction started on the building of a new chancery and official residence of the ambassador called Wisma Duta at the current location. Construction was completed in 1968.

== Gallery ==
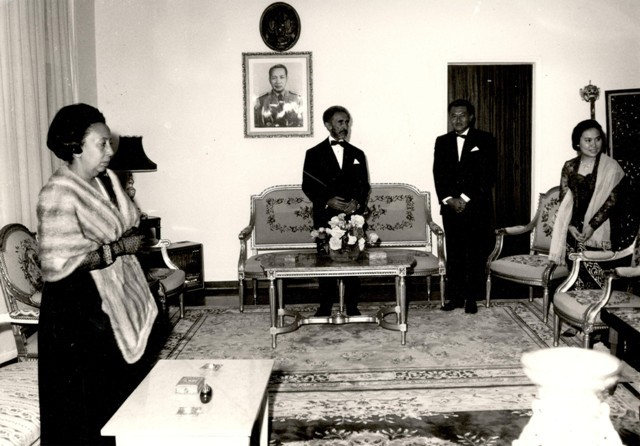
Emperor Haile Selassie attending a dinner reception at the embassy in 1968

== See also ==
- Ethiopia–Indonesia relations
- List of diplomatic missions of Indonesia
- List of diplomatic missions in Ethiopia
