= Visa requirements for Ethiopian citizens =

Administrative entry restrictions

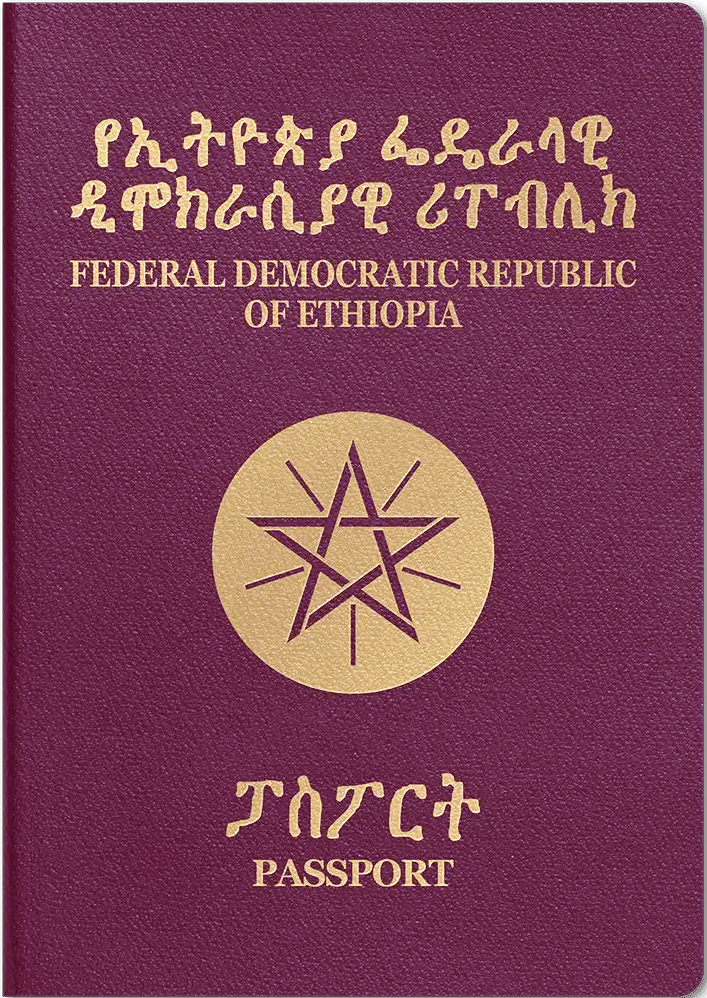
Ethiopian passport

Visa requirements for Ethiopian citizens are administrative entry restrictions by the authorities of other states placed on citizens of Ethiopia. As of 2026, Ethiopian citizens had visa-free or visa on arrival access to 42 countries and territories, ranking the Ethiopian passport 70th in terms of travel freedom according to the Henley Passport Index.

== Visa requirements map ==
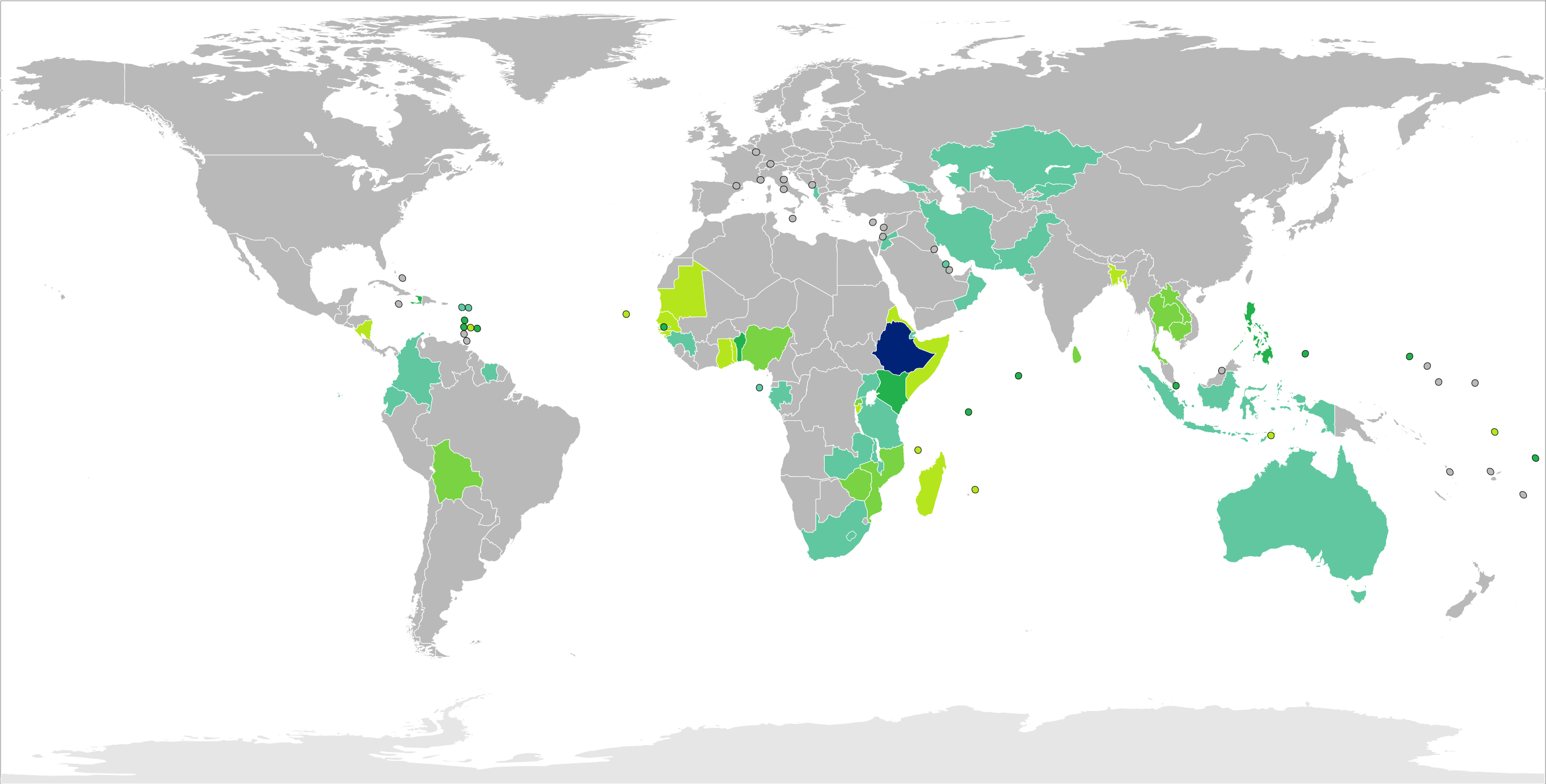
Visa requirements for Ethiopian citizens Ethiopia Visa free access Visa on arrival eVisa Visa available both on arrival or online (e Visa) Visa required

== Visa requirements ==
Country	Visa requirement	Allowed stay	Notes (excluding departure fees)
Afghanistan	eVisa		Visa is not required in case born in Afghanistan or can proof that one of their parents is a national of Afghanistan or born in Afghanistan.; e-Visa : Visitors must arrive at Kabul International (KBL).
Albania	eVisa		Visa is not required for Holders of a valid multiple-entry Schengen, UK or US visa has been previously used once or residence permit of Schengen, UK, US or UAE 10 years.
Algeria	Visa required		
Andorra	Visa required		
Angola	Visa required		
Antigua and Barbuda	eVisa		
Argentina	Visa required		The AVE (High Speed Travel) is open to Ethiopian citizens holding valid, current ordinary passports traveling to Argentina for tourism. To do so, they must hold a valid category B2/J/B1/O/P (P1-P2-P3)/E/H-1B visa issued by the United States of America.
Armenia	Visa required		
Australia and territories	Online Visa required		May apply online (Online Visitor e600 visa).
Austria	Visa required		
Azerbaijan	Visa required		
Bahamas	eVisa	90 days	
Bahrain	eVisa		
Bangladesh	Visa on arrival	30 days	
Barbados	Visa not required	90 days	
Belarus	Visa required		Passengers can enter with a visa issued by the Russian Fed. The visa must be valid for the duration of stay.
Belgium	Visa required		
Belize	Visa required		
Benin	Visa not required	90 days	
Bhutan	eVisa		e-Visa applicant is also subject to pay Sustainable Development Fee
Bolivia	eVisa / Visa on arrival	90 days	
Bosnia and Herzegovina	Visa required		
Botswana	Visa required		
Brazil	Visa required		
Brunei	Visa required		
Bulgaria	Visa required		
Burkina Faso	eVisa		
Burundi	Visa on arrival	1 month	
Cambodia	eVisa / Visa on arrival	30 days	
Cameroon	eVisa		
Canada	Visa required		
Cape Verde	Visa on arrival	30 days	Visa on arrival at Sal, Boa Vista, São Vicente or Santiago international airports.; Requirement to register online 5 days before arrival; Also pay the airport security fee of CVE 3400 either online or on arrival.
Central African Republic	Visa required		
Chad	eVisa		
Chile	Visa required		
China	Visa required		
Colombia	eVisa		
Comoros	Visa on arrival	45 days	
Republic of the Congo	Visa required		
Democratic Republic of the Congo	eVisa		
Costa Rica	Visa required		Holders of a valid multiple-entry visa of any member state of the Schengen Area, Canada, or the United States may enter Cost Rica without a visa for maximum stay of 30 days.
Côte d'Ivoire	eVisa		Passengers with a printed "Approved pre-enrolment" and a "Registration Receipt" obtained before departure can obtain a visa on arrival at Abidjan (ABJ).; Passengers with an invitation letter issued by the authorities of Cote d'Ivoire obtained before departure can obtain a visa on arrival.
Croatia	Visa required		
Cuba	eVisa		
Cyprus	Visa required		
Czech Republic	Visa required		
Denmark	Visa required		
Djibouti	eVisa / Visa on arrival		
Dominica	Visa not required	21 days	
Dominican Republic	Visa required		
Ecuador	eVisa		
Egypt	Visa required		
El Salvador	eVisa		
Equatorial Guinea	eVisa		Must arrive via Malabo International Airport, processing fee 75 USD
Eritrea	Visa on arrival	30 days	
Estonia	Visa required		
Eswatini	Visa required		
Fiji	Visa required		
Finland	Visa required		
France	Visa required		
Gabon	eVisa		
Gambia	Visa not required	90 days	
Georgia	eVisa		
Germany	Visa required		
Ghana	Visa on arrival	30 days	
Greece	Visa required		
Grenada	Visa required		
Guatemala	Visa required		
Guinea	eVisa		
Guinea-Bissau	Visa on arrival	90 days	
Guyana	Visa required	30 days	passengers traveling as tourists with an approval letter issued by ministry of home affairs (immigration section) of guyana can obtain a visa on arrival for a maximum stay of 30 days.
Haiti	Visa not required	3 months	
Honduras	Visa required		
Hungary	Visa required		
Iceland	Visa required		
India	Visa required		
Indonesia	eVisa		
Iran	eVisa		Visa Exemptions: Passengers arriving at Kish (KIH) and Qeshm (GSM) islands for a maximum stay of 14 days.; Passengers can obtain a visa on arrival at Mashhad (MHD) for a maximum stay of 30 days.
Iraq	Visa required		
Ireland	Visa required		
Israel	Visa required		
Italy	Visa required		
Jamaica	Visa required		
Japan	Visa required		
Jordan	eVisa		Nationals of Ethiopia traveling for medical treatment can obtain a visa on arrival. They must have a medical report issued by a Jordanian hospital to prove the need to continue their treatment. They are allowed to be accompanied by 2 immediate family members above 18 years.
Kazakhstan	eVisa		Passengers arriving from a countrywithout kazakh representation and with an invitation letter can obtain a visa on arrival at almaty (ala) and nur-sultan (nqz) for a maximum stay of 1 month. passengers must have a confirmation from the ministry of foreign affairs that a visa has been approved before departure.
Kenya	Visa not required	3 months	
Kiribati	Visa required		
North Korea	Visa required		
South Korea	Visa required		Passengers traveling as tourist to Jeju (CJU) are visa exempt for a maximum stay of 30 days. They must hold confirmed tickets and other documents for their next destination.
Kuwait	Visa required		Holders of residence permit's issued by Saudi Arabia, Bahrain, Qatar, Oman and the United Arab Emirates may apply for an eVisa if the main applicant works in a specific profession. Dependents holding residence permits may also obtain an eVisa, on the conditional they will enter Kuwait with the main applicant.
Kyrgyzstan	eVisa		
Laos	eVisa / Visa on arrival	30 days	
Latvia	Visa required		
Lebanon	Visa required		
Lesotho	eVisa		
Liberia	Visa required		
Libya	Visa required		
Liechtenstein	Visa required		
Lithuania	Visa required		
Luxembourg	Visa required		
Madagascar	eVisa / Visa on arrival	90 days	
Malawi	eVisa	90 days	
Malaysia	eVisa	14 days	
Maldives	Free Visa on arrival	30 days	
Mali	Visa required		
Malta	Visa required		
Marshall Islands	Visa required		
Mauritania	eVisa		
Mauritius	Visa on arrival	60 days	
Mexico	Visa required		Visa is not required for Holders of a valid visa of Canada, US, UK or a Schengen State and Permanent residence of Canada, Chile, Colombia, Schengen State, Japan, UK, US; Entry may be refused by immigration officials for individuals who were previously denied a US visa, even if holding a valid Mexican visa.
Micronesia	Visa not required	30 days	
Moldova	eVisa		visa not required if holding a valid visa /residence permit that is issued by a European Union member state or Schengen Area, Canada, Ireland, UK, US
Monaco	Visa required		
Mongolia	eVisa		
Montenegro	Visa required		Visa not required for holders of a valid Australia, Japan, Canada, New Zealand, Ireland, US, UK or a Schengen Visa.; Holders of residence permit in the United Arab Emirates may enter, in Montenegro for a duration of 10 days
Morocco	Visa required		May apply for an e-Visa if holding a valid visa or a residency document issued by one of the following countries: Schengen Area, Australia, Canada, Ireland, New Zealand, United Kingdom, United States a residency document issued by Cyprus, Japan, United Arab Emirates.
Mozambique	Visa required		
Myanmar	Visa required		
Namibia	eVisa		
Nauru	Visa required		
Nepal	Visa required		
Netherlands	Visa required		
New Zealand	Visa required		Holders of an Australian Permanent Resident Visa or Resident Return Visa may be granted a New Zealand Resident Visa on arrival permitting indefinite stay (pursuant to the Trans-Tasman Travel Arrangement), subject to meeting character requirements and obtaining an Electronic Travel Authority prior to departure.
Nicaragua	Visa on arrival	30 days	
Niger	Visa required		Passengers with a letter (visa volant) can obtain a visa on arrival for a maximum stay of 30 days
Nigeria	eVisa		
North Macedonia	Visa required		Visa is not required for stays upto 15 days if holding a valid multiple entry visa of Canada, the United States, United Kingdom, Schengen Area member state, or residence permit of Schengen Area member state.
Norway	Visa required		
Oman	eVisa		Passengers can obtain a transit visa on arrival for a maximum stay of 72 hours
Pakistan	eVisa		
Palau	Free Visa on arrival	30 days	
Panama	Visa required		
Papua New Guinea	eVisa	60 days	May apply for an e-visa under the type of "Tourist - Own Itinerary"
Paraguay	Visa required		
Peru	Visa required		
Philippines	Visa not required	30 days	
Poland	Visa required		
Portugal	Visa required		
Qatar	eVisa		
Romania	Visa required		
Russia	Visa required		Passengers can enter with a visa issued by Belarus. The visa must be valid for the period of intended stay in Russian Fed.
Rwanda	eVisa / Visa on arrival	90 days	May apply online.; Can also be entered on an East Africa tourist visa issued by Kenya or Uganda
Saint Kitts and Nevis	eVisa		
Saint Lucia	Visa on arrival	6 weeks	
Saint Vincent and the Grenadines	Visa not required	3 months	
Samoa	Visa not required	90 days	
San Marino	Visa required		
São Tomé and Príncipe	eVisa	15 days	
Saudi Arabia	Visa required		
Senegal	Visa on arrival	1 month	
Serbia	Visa required		
Seychelles	Free Visitor's Permit on arrival	3 months	
Sierra Leone	eVisa		Passengers with a confirmation from immigration that a visa has been approved before departure can obtain a visa on arrival.
Singapore	Visa not required	30 days	
Slovakia	Visa required		
Slovenia	Visa required		
Solomon Islands	Visa required		
Somalia	Visa on arrival	30 days	
South Africa	eVisa		eVisa holders must arrive via cape town (cpt) or johannesburg (jnb) airports.
South Sudan	eVisa		
Spain	Visa required		
Sri Lanka	ETA / Visa on arrival		Electronic Travel Authorization can also be obtained on arrival.; 30 days extendable to 6 months.; The standard visitor visa allows a stay of 60 days within any 6-month period.; Visa fees (for Standard visitor visa): SAARC - USD 35; Non SAARC - USD 75; e-Visa categories will be charged an additional USD 18.50 service fee.; If transiting from any of the Sri Lankan airports, An e-Visa is exempted (2 day transit period).
Sudan	Visa required		Passengers with an entry permit issued by the sudanese ministry of interior can obtain a visa on arrival for a maximum stay of 60 days.
Suriname	eVisa		
Sweden	Visa required		
Switzerland	Visa required		
Syria	Visa required		
Tajikistan	eVisa		
Tanzania	eVisa / Visa on arrival		
Thailand	eVisa		
Timor-Leste	Visa on arrival	30 days	
Togo	Visa on arrival	15 days	
Tonga	Visa required		
Trinidad and Tobago	Visa required		Passengers with a confirmation from immigration that a visa has been approved before departure can obtain a visa on arrival.
Tunisia	Visa required		
Turkey	Visa required		
Turkmenistan	Visa required		Passengers with a letter ofinvitation issued by a company registered in turkmenistan and approved by the ministry of foreign affairs can obtain a visa on arrival for a maximum stay of 10 days.
Tuvalu	Visa on arrival	1 month	
Uganda	eVisa		
Ukraine	Visa required		
United Arab Emirates	Visa required		
United Kingdom and Crown dependencies	Visa required		
United States	Visa required		
Uruguay	Visa required		
Uzbekistan	Visa required		
Vanuatu	Visa required		
Vatican City	Visa required		
Venezuela	Visa required		
Vietnam	eVisa	90 days	Visa free for 30 days when visiting Phú Quốc
Yemen	Visa required		
Zambia	eVisa	90 days	
Zimbabwe	eVisa / Visa on arrival	3 months	30 days for visits on business, 3 months for tourists

== Dependent, Disputed, or Restricted territories ==
Unrecognized or partially recognized countries

Territory	Conditions of access	Notes
Abkhazia	Visa required	
Kosovo	Visa required	Do not need a visa a holder of a valid biometric residence permit issued by one of the Schengen member states or a valid multi-entry Schengen Visa, a holder of a valid Laissez-Passer issued by United Nations Organizations, NATO, OSCE, Council of Europe or European Union a holder of a valid travel documents issued by EU Member and Schengen States, United States of America, Canada, Australia and Japan based on the 1951 Convention on Refugee Status or the 1954 Convention on the Status of Stateless Persons, as well as holders of valid travel documents for foreigners (max. 15 days stay)
Northern Cyprus	Visa not required	
Palestine	Visa not required	Arrival by sea to Gaza Strip not allowed.
Sahrawi Arab Democratic Republic		Undefined visa regime in the Western Sahara controlled territory.
Somaliland	Visa on arrival	30 days for 30 US dollars, payable on arrival.
South Ossetia	Visa not required	Multiple entry visa to Russia and three day prior notification are required to enter South Ossetia.
Taiwan	Visa required	
Transnistria	Visa not required	Registration required after 24h.

Dependent and autonomous territories

Territory	Conditions of access	Notes
China
Hong Kong	eVisa	
Macau	Visa on arrival	
Denmark
Faroe Islands	Visa required	
Greenland	Visa required	
France
French Guiana	Visa required	
French Polynesia	Visa required	
(France) French West Indies	Visa required	Includes overseas departments of Guadeloupe and Martinique and overseas collectivities of Saint Barthélemy and Saint Martin.
Mayotte	Visa required	
New Caledonia	Visa required	
Réunion	Visa required	
Saint Pierre and Miquelon	Visa required	
Wallis and Futuna	Visa required	
Netherlands
Aruba	Visa required	
Caribbean Netherlands	Visa required	Includes Bonaire, Sint Eustatius and Saba.
Curaçao	Visa required	
Sint Maarten	Visa required	
New Zealand
Cook Islands	Visa not required	31 days
Niue	Visa not required	30 days
Tokelau	Visa required	
United Kingdom
Akrotiri and Dhekelia	Visa required	
Anguilla	Visa required	Holders of a valid visa issued by the United Kingdom do not require a visa.
Bermuda	Visa required	
British Indian Ocean Territory	Special permit required	Special permit required.
British Virgin Islands	Visa required	
Cayman Islands	Visa required	
Falkland Islands	Visa required	
Gibraltar	Visa required	
Montserrat	eVisa	
Pitcairn Islands	Visa not required	14 days visa free and landing fee US$35 or tax of US$5 if not going ashore.
Ascension Island	eVisa	3 months within any year period
Saint Helena	eVisa	
Tristan da Cunha	Permission required	Permission to land required for 15/30 pounds sterling (yacht/ship passenger) for Tristan da Cunha Island or 20 pounds sterling for Gough Island, Inaccessible Island or Nightingale Islands.
South Georgia and the South Sandwich Islands	Permit required	Pre-arrival permit from the Commissioner required (72 hours/1 month for 110/160 pounds sterling).
Turks and Caicos Islands	Visa required	Holders of a valid visa issued by Canada, United Kingdom or the USA do not required a visa for a maximum stay of 90 days.
United States
American Samoa	Visa required	
Guam	Visa required	
Northern Mariana Islands	Visa required	
Puerto Rico	Visa required	
U.S. Virgin Islands	Visa required	
Antarctica and adjacent islands
Special permits required for Bouvet Island, British Antarctic Territory, French Southern and Antarctic Lands, Argentine Antarctica, (Australia) Australian Antarctic Territory, (Antártica Chilena Province) Chilean Antarctic Territory, (Australia) Heard Island and McDonald Islands, (Norway) Peter I Island, (Norway) Queen Maud Land, (New Zealand) Ross Dependency.

== See also ==
- Visa policy of Ethiopia
- Ethiopian passport
