= Visa policy of Ethiopia =

Policy on permits required to enter Ethiopia

Visitors to Ethiopia must obtain a visa from one of the Ethiopian diplomatic missions, unless they come from one of the visa exempt countries or countries whose citizens are eligible to apply for an electronic visa or visa on arrival.

== Visa policy map ==
Visa policy of Ethiopia Ethiopia Visa not required Visa on arrival or eVisa Visa on arrival eVisa Visa required

== Visa exemption ==
Citizens of the following countries do not require a visa to visit Ethiopia:

- Djibouti (3 months)
- Kenya (1 year)

=== Transit ===
Regardless of nationality, travelers in transit do not require a visa if they arrive by air, remain in the permitted transit area and depart by air within 12 hours.

== Visa on arrival ==
Tourist visa (valid for up to 3 months) can be issued on arrival at Addis Ababa Bole International Airport to nationals of the following countries and territories, or persons holding residence permits issued by these countries or territories.

- African Union member states^{1}
- All European Union member states

- Argentina
- Australia
- Bahrain
- Belarus
- Bosnia and Herzegovina
- Brazil
- Canada
- China
- Georgia
- Hong Kong
- Iceland
- India
- Indonesia
- Israel
- Japan
- Jordan
- Kosovo
- Kuwait
- Lebanon
- Liechtenstein
- Malaysia
- Mexico
- Monaco
- Montenegro
- New Zealand
- North Korea
- North Macedonia
- Norway
- Oman
- Philippines
- Qatar
- Russia
- Saudi Arabia
- Serbia
- Singapore
- South Korea
- Switzerland
- Taiwan
- Thailand
- Turkey
- Ukraine
- United Arab Emirates
- United Kingdom
- United States

_{1 - Excluding nationals of Egypt, Eritrea, Libya, Nigeria and Sudan.}

== Electronic Visa (e-Visa) ==
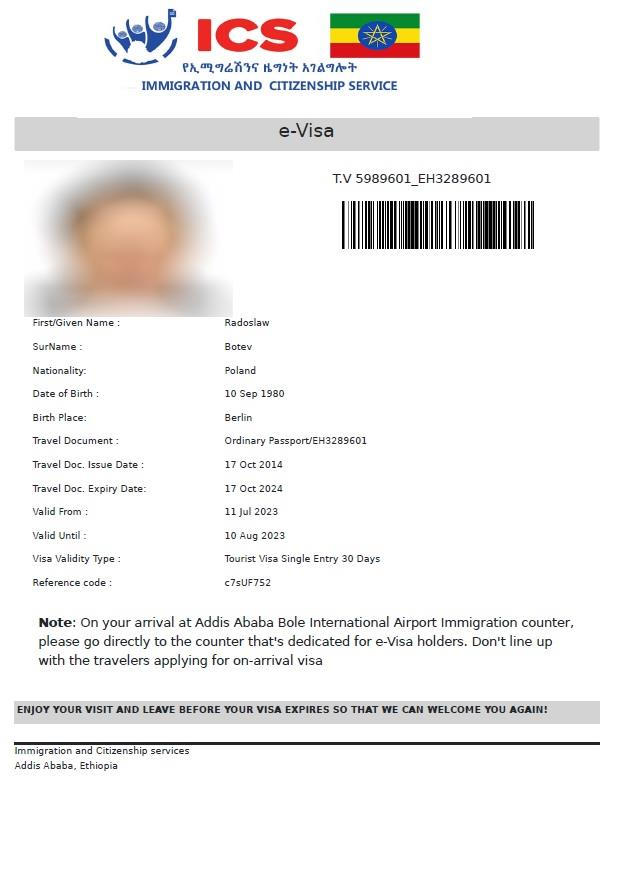
Sample of Ethiopian eVisa

Ethiopia launched its own electronic visa platform on 12 June 2017. Citizens of all countries in the world are eligible for tourist e-Visa.

Travelers with e-Visa must enter Ethiopia via Addis Ababa Bole International Airport. Entering from other ports of entry is prohibited.

According to the e-Visa website, as of November 18, 2020, credit card payment transactions are not accepted for applicants from the following countries and Crimea region.

- Afghanistan
- Cuba
- Iraq
- North Korea
- Somalia
- South Sudan
- Sudan
- Syria
- Yemen

== Land border arrivals ==
Physical visas are required for all visitors (except visa-exempt Kenya and Djibouti nationals) entering Ethiopia by land, which means arriving in any border other than Addis Ababa Bole International Airport. These visas must be obtained from one of the Ethiopian diplomatic missions before departure.

== See also ==
- Visa requirements for Ethiopian citizens
