= List of diplomatic missions of Ethiopia =

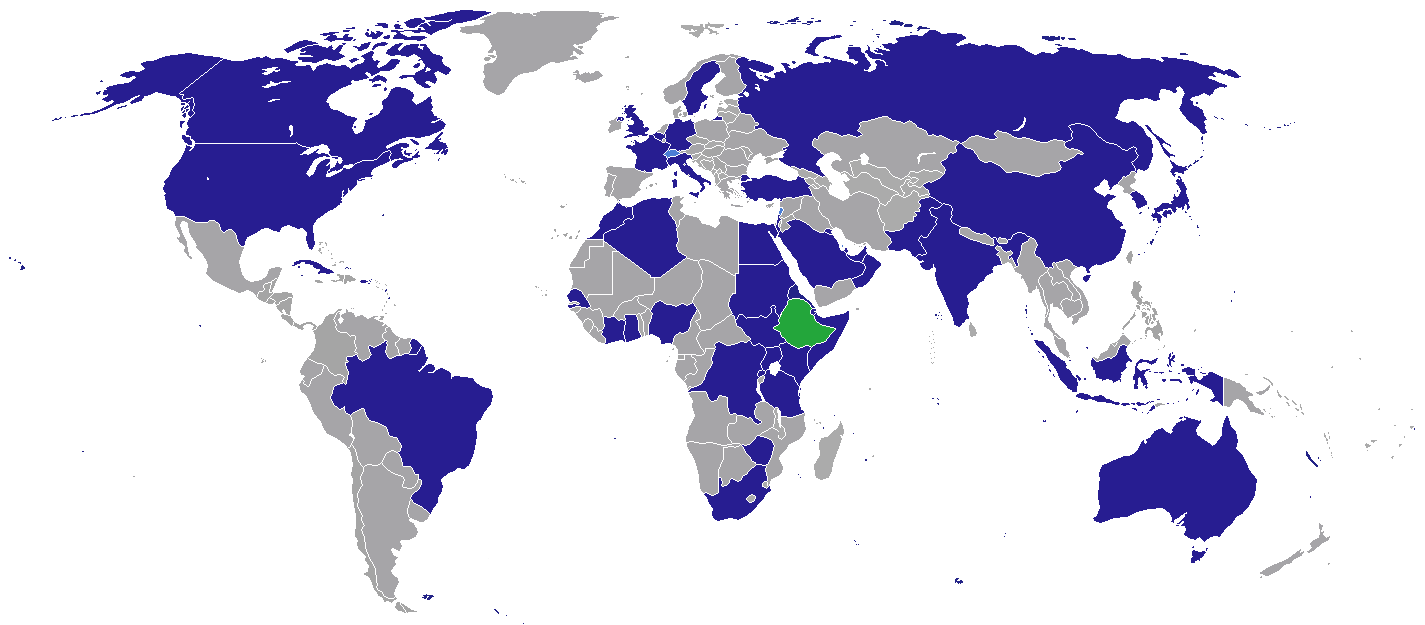
Federal Democratic Republic of Ethiopia Countries that host Ethiopian embassies Countries that host only Ethiopian consulates-general and permanent missions to international organizations

This is a list of diplomatic missions of Ethiopia, excluding honorary consulates.

== History ==
In July 2021, the Ethiopian government announced that 30 overseas missions will be closed in light of the financial constraints brought by the COVID-19 pandemic and the Tigray War.

These included, among many others, the consulates-general in China (Chongqing, Guangzhou, & Shanghai), Germany (Frankfurt), and the United States (Los Angeles & Saint Paul), and the embassies in Algiers, Brasília, Cairo, Dublin, Harare, Havana, Jakarta, Kuwait, Ottawa, and The Hague.

In the following years, Ethiopia reopened a number of its previously closed embassies, namely the ones in Algiers, Brasília, Cairo, Harare, Havana, Jakarta, Kuwait, and Ottawa.

== Current missions ==
=== Africa ===
Host country	Host city	Mission	Concurrent accreditation	Ref.
Algeria	Algiers	Embassy		
Congo-Kinshasa	Kinshasa	Embassy	Countries: Angola; Gabon	
Djibouti	Djibouti City	Embassy	International Organizations: Intergovernmental Authority on Development	
Egypt	Cairo	Embassy	Countries: Lebanon; Libya; Palestine	
Ghana	Accra	Embassy	Countries: Sierra Leone	
Ivory Coast	Abidjan	Embassy	Countries: Burkina Faso; Cameroon	
Kenya	Nairobi	Embassy	Countries: Comoros; Malawi; Seychelles; International Organizations: United Nations; United Nations Environment Programme; United Nations Human Settlements Programme	
Morocco	Rabat	Embassy		
Nigeria	Abuja	Embassy	Countries: Benin; Equatorial Guinea; São Tomé and Príncipe; Togo; International Organizations: Economic Community of West African States	
Rwanda	Kigali	Embassy	Countries: Central African Republic; Congo-Brazzaville	
Senegal	Dakar	Embassy	Countries: Cape Verde; Gambia; Guinea; Guinea-Bissau; Mauritania	
Somalia	Mogadishu	Embassy		
Somalia	Garoowe	Consulate-General		
Somaliland (Note: Ethiopia does not recognize the unilaterally-declared independence of Somaliland, and has formal diplomatic relations with Somalia. Nonetheless, Ethiopia has a consulate-general in Hargeisa, the capital of Somaliland.)	Hargeisa	Consulate-General		
South Africa	Pretoria	Embassy	Countries: Botswana; Eswatini; Lesotho; Madagascar; Mozambique; Namibia	
South Sudan	Juba	Embassy		
Sudan	Khartoum	Embassy		
Sudan	Al-Gadarif	Consulate-General		
Tanzania	Dar Es Salaam	Embassy		
Uganda	Kampala	Embassy	Countries: Burundi	
Zimbabwe	Harare	Embassy	Countries: Mauritius; Zambia; International Organizations: Common Market for Eastern and Southern Africa	

=== Americas ===
Host country	Host city	Mission	Concurrent accreditation	Ref.
Brazil	Brasília	Embassy	Countries: Chile; Uruguay	
Canada	Ottawa	Embassy	Countries: Haiti; Trinidad and Tobago	
Cuba	Havana	Embassy	Countries: Bahamas; Barbados; Dominica; Dominican Republic; Ecuador; Nicaragua; Saint Vincent and the Grenadines	
United States	Washington, D.C.	Embassy	Countries: Jamaica; Mexico	

=== Asia ===
Host country	Host city	Mission	Concurrent accreditation	Ref.
Bahrain	Manama	Consulate-General (Note: Subordinate to the embassy in Kuwait City.)		
China	Beijing	Embassy	Countries: Cambodia	
India	New Delhi	Embassy	Countries: Bangladesh; Bhutan; Nepal; Sri Lanka; Thailand	
India	Mumbai	Consulate-General	Countries: Bangladesh; Bhutan; Nepal; Sri Lanka; Thailand	
Indonesia	Jakarta	Embassy	Countries: Brunei; Malaysia; Maldives; Singapore; Timor-Leste; Multilateral Organizations: Association of Southeast Asian Nations	
Israel	Tel Aviv	Embassy		
Japan	Tokyo	Embassy	Countries: Myanmar	
Kuwait	Kuwait City	Embassy	Countries: Bahrain; Iraq	
Lebanon	Beirut	Consulate-General (Note: Subordinate to the embassy in Cairo.)		
Oman	Muscat	Embassy		
Qatar	Doha	Embassy	Countries: Iran; Yemen	
Pakistan	Islamabad	Embassy	Countries: Kyrgyzstan; Tajikistan; Turkmenistan	
Saudi Arabia	Riyadh	Embassy		
Saudi Arabia	Jeddah	Consulate-General		
South Korea	Seoul	Embassy	Countries: Philippines; Vietnam	
Turkey	Ankara	Embassy	Countries: Azerbaijan; Bulgaria; Georgia; Kazakhstan	
United Arab Emirates	Abu Dhabi	Embassy	Countries: Jordan; Syria; Multilateral Organizations: International Renewable Energy Agency	
United Arab Emirates	Dubai	Consulate-General	Countries: Jordan; Syria; Multilateral Organizations: International Renewable Energy Agency	

=== Europe ===
Host country	Host city	Mission	Concurrent accreditation	Ref.
Belgium	Brussels	Embassy	Countries: Lithuania; Luxembourg; Netherlands; International Organizations: European Union	
France	Paris	Embassy	Countries: Holy See; Monaco; Portugal; Spain; International Organizations: UNESCO	
Germany	Berlin	Embassy	Countries: Czechia; Latvia; Poland; Slovakia; Ukraine	
Italy	Rome	Embassy	Countries: Albania; Bosnia and Herzegovina; Croatia; Cyprus; Greece; Malta; North Macedonia; Serbia; Slovenia; International Organizations: Food and Agriculture Organization; International Fund for Agricultural Development; World Food Programme	
Russia	Moscow	Embassy	Countries: Armenia; Belarus; Moldova	
Sweden	Stockholm	Embassy	Countries: Denmark; Finland; Norway	
United Kingdom	London	Embassy	Countries: Ireland	>

=== Oceania ===
Host country	Host city	Mission	Concurrent accreditation	Ref.
Australia	Canberra	Embassy	Countries: New Zealand	

=== Multilateral organizations ===
Organization	Host city	Host country	Mission	Concurrent accreditation	Ref.
African Union	Addis Ababa	Ethiopia	Permanent Mission	International Organizations: United Nations Economic Commission for Africa	
United Nations	New York City	United States	Permanent Mission	Countries: Guatemala	
United Nations	Geneva	Switzerland	Permanent Mission	Countries: Austria; Hungary; Romania; Switzerland	

== Gallery ==
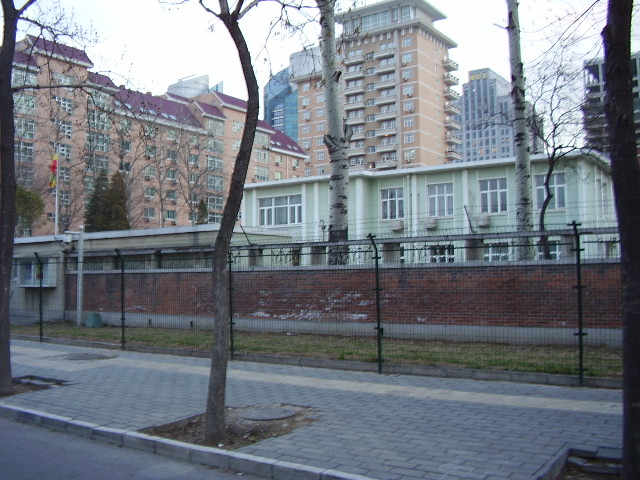
Embassy in Beijing

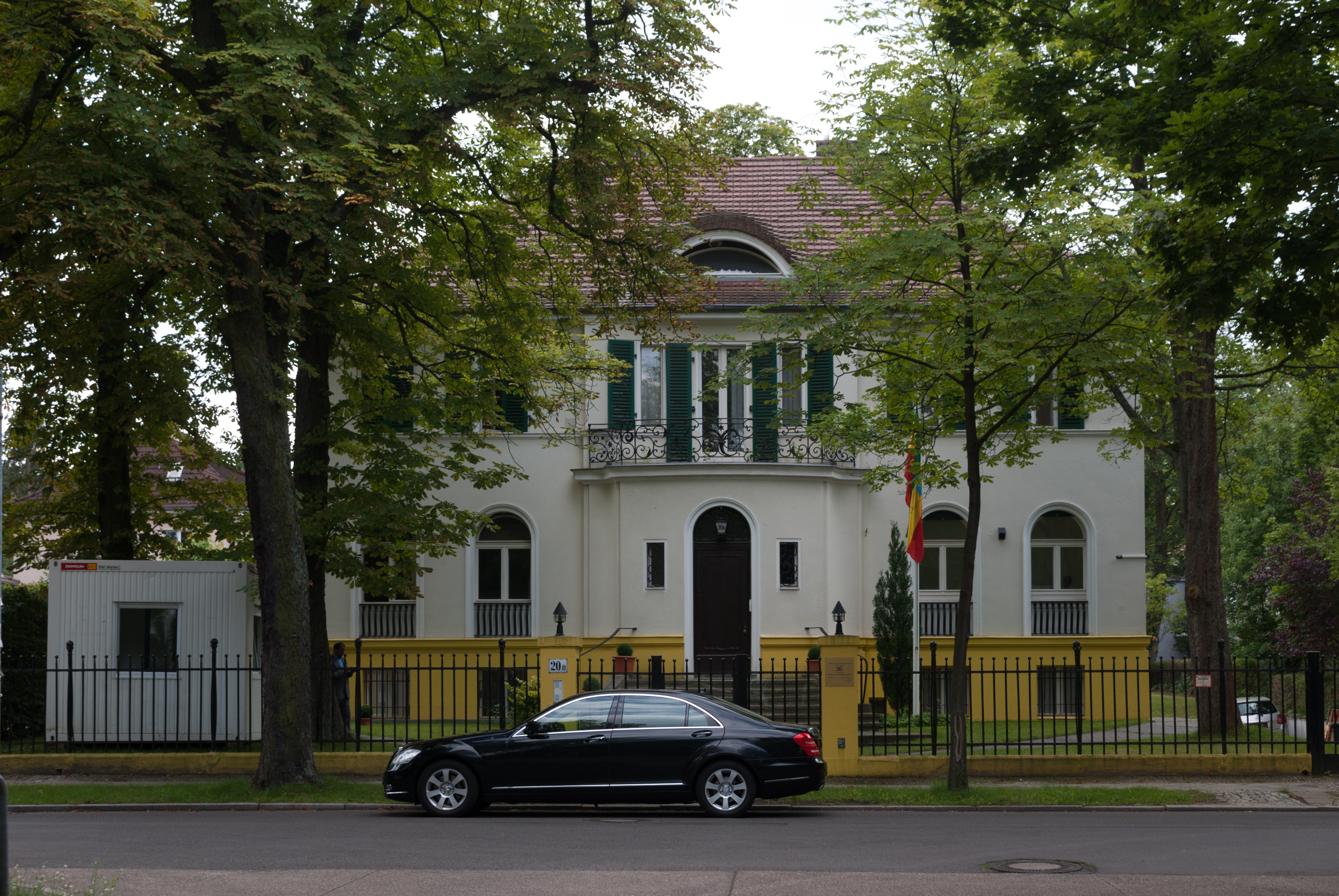
Embassy in Berlin

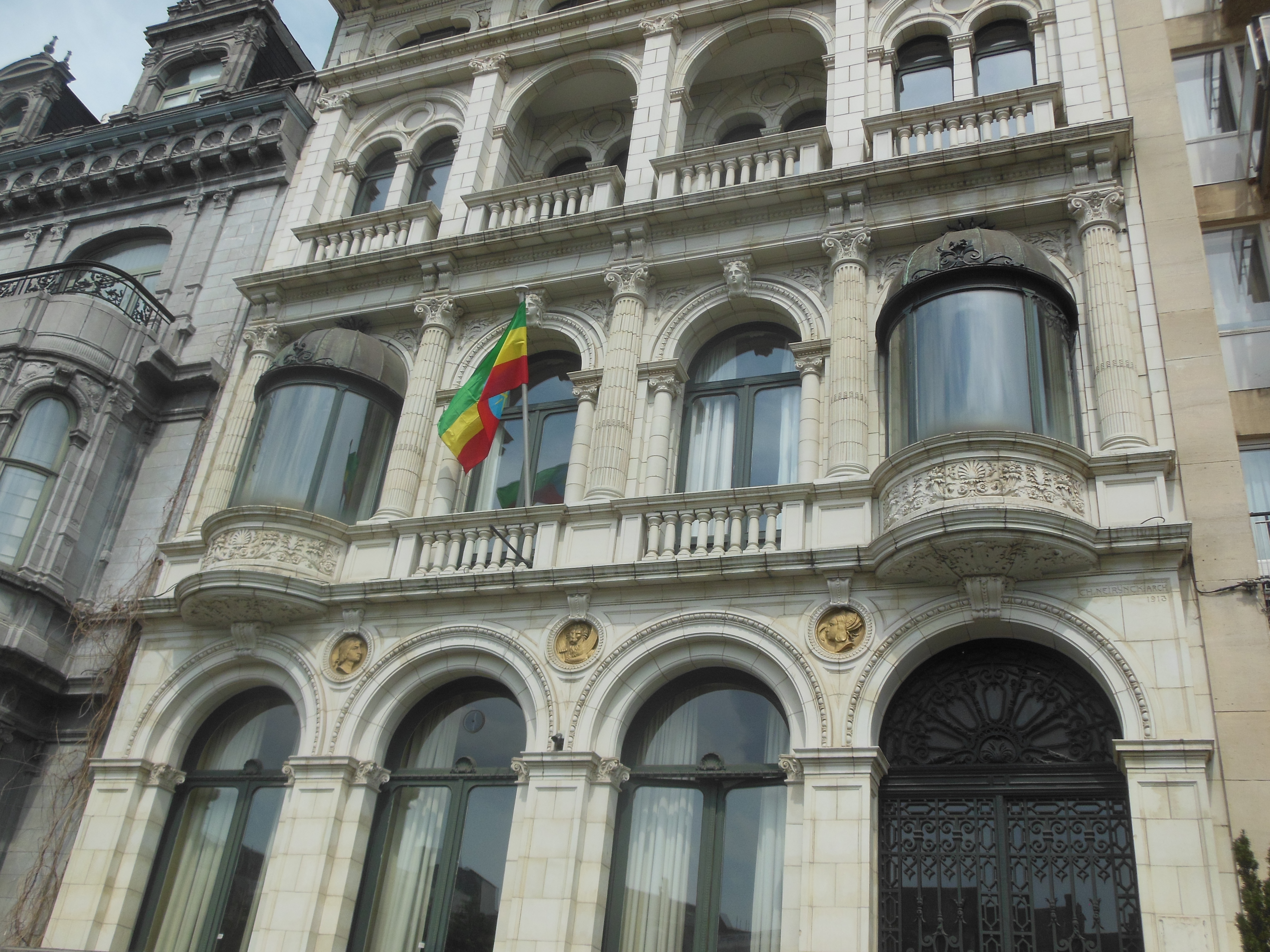
Embassy in Brussels

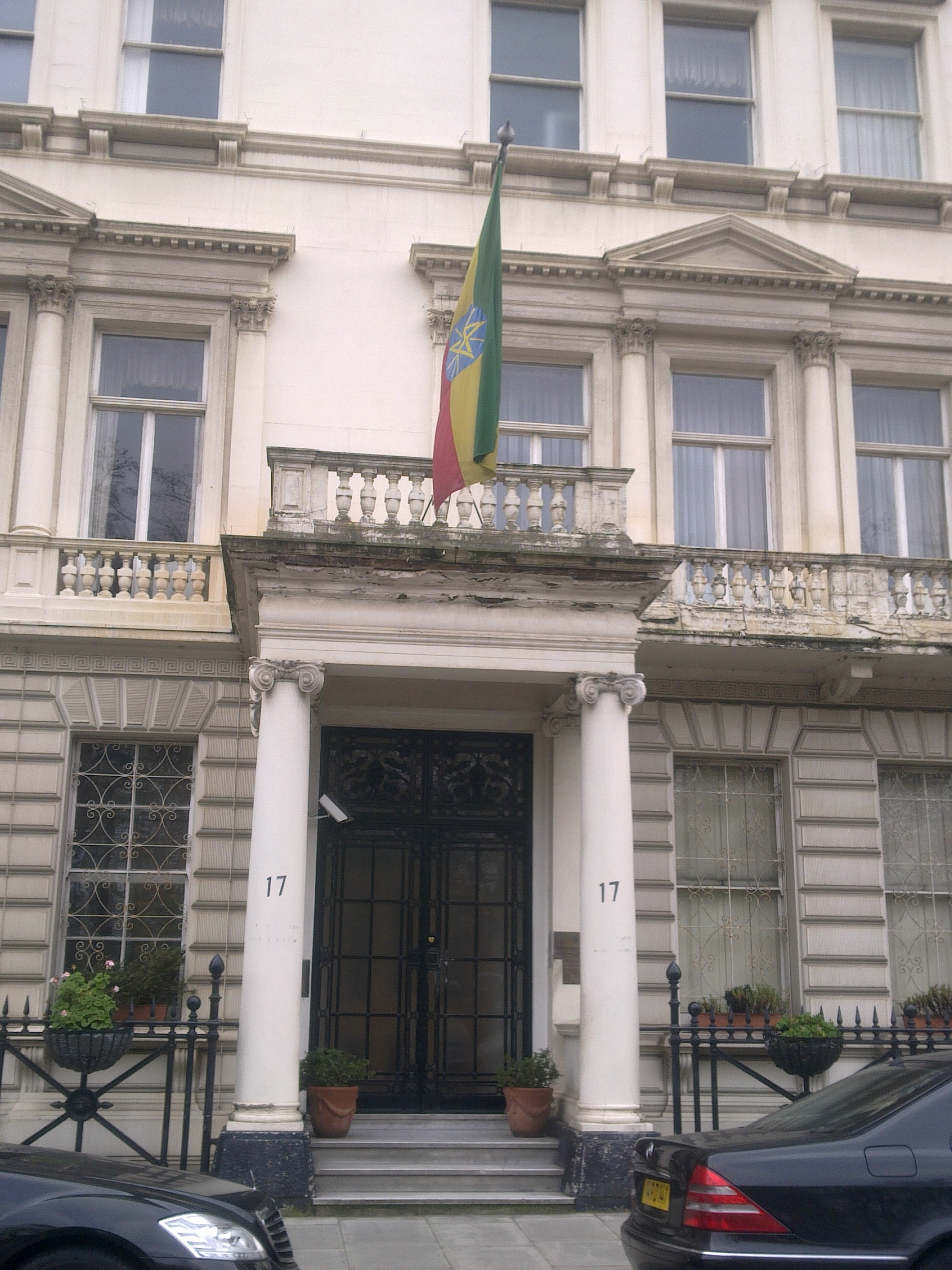
Embassy in London

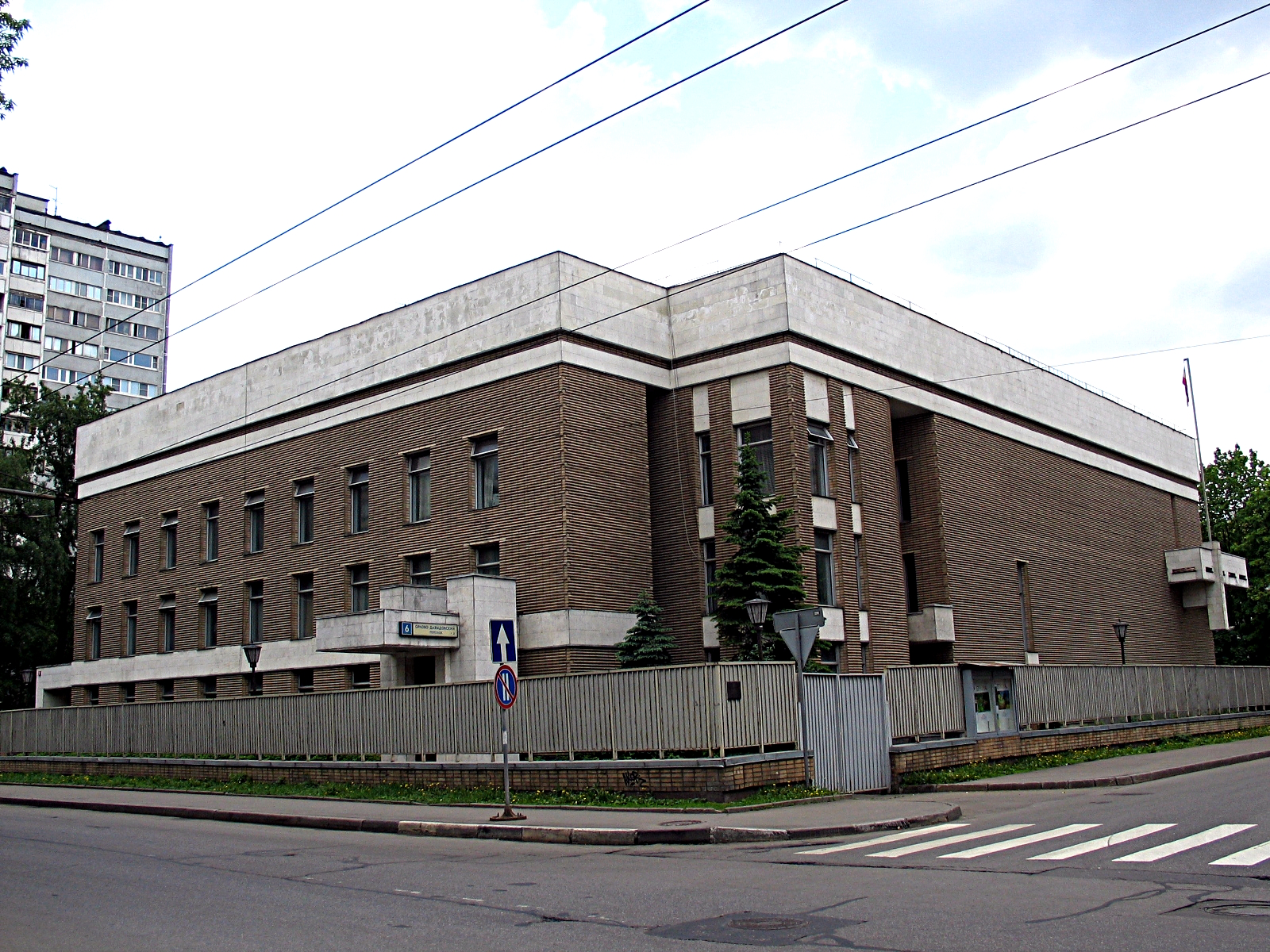
Embassy in Moscow

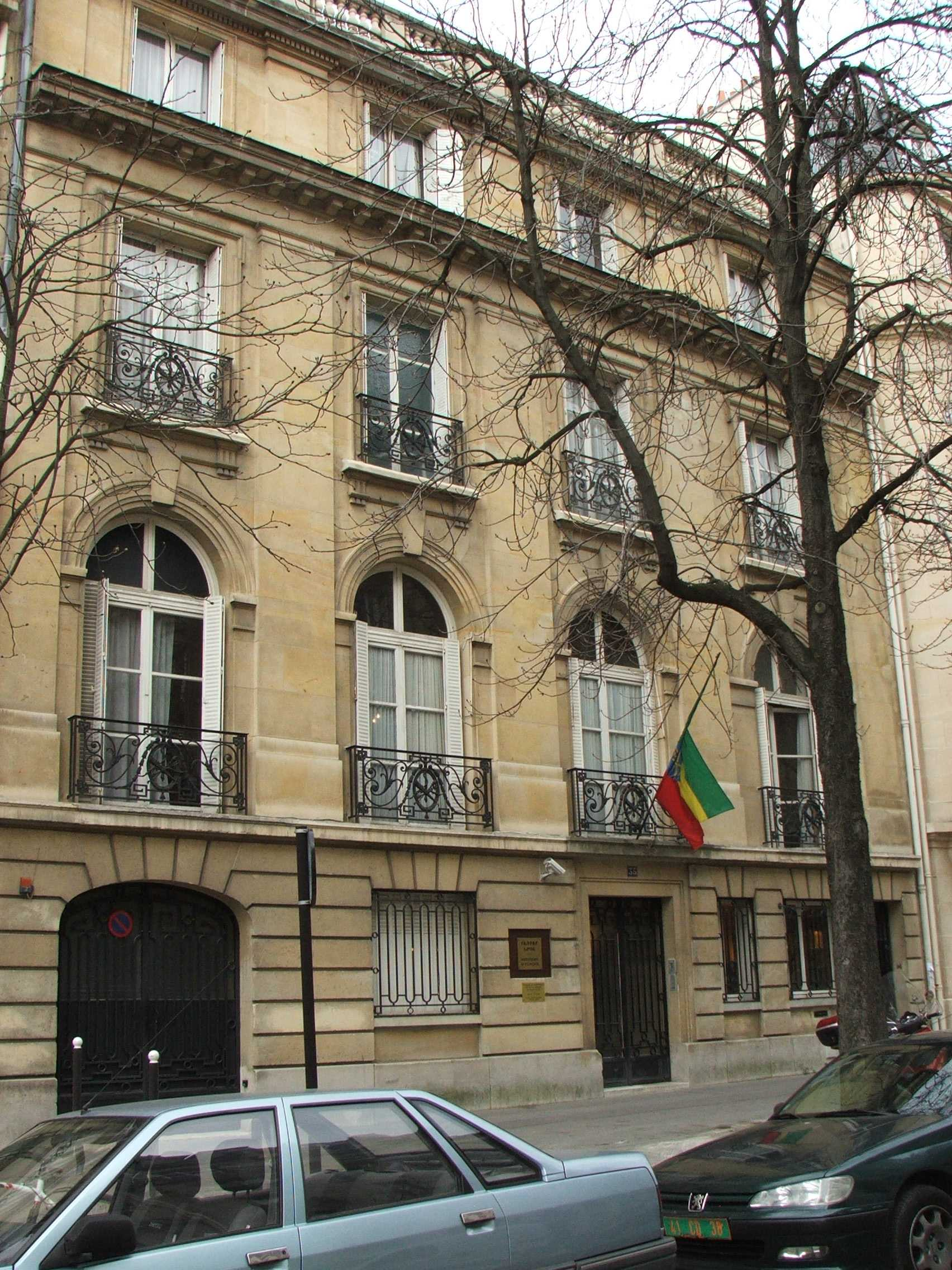
Embassy in Paris

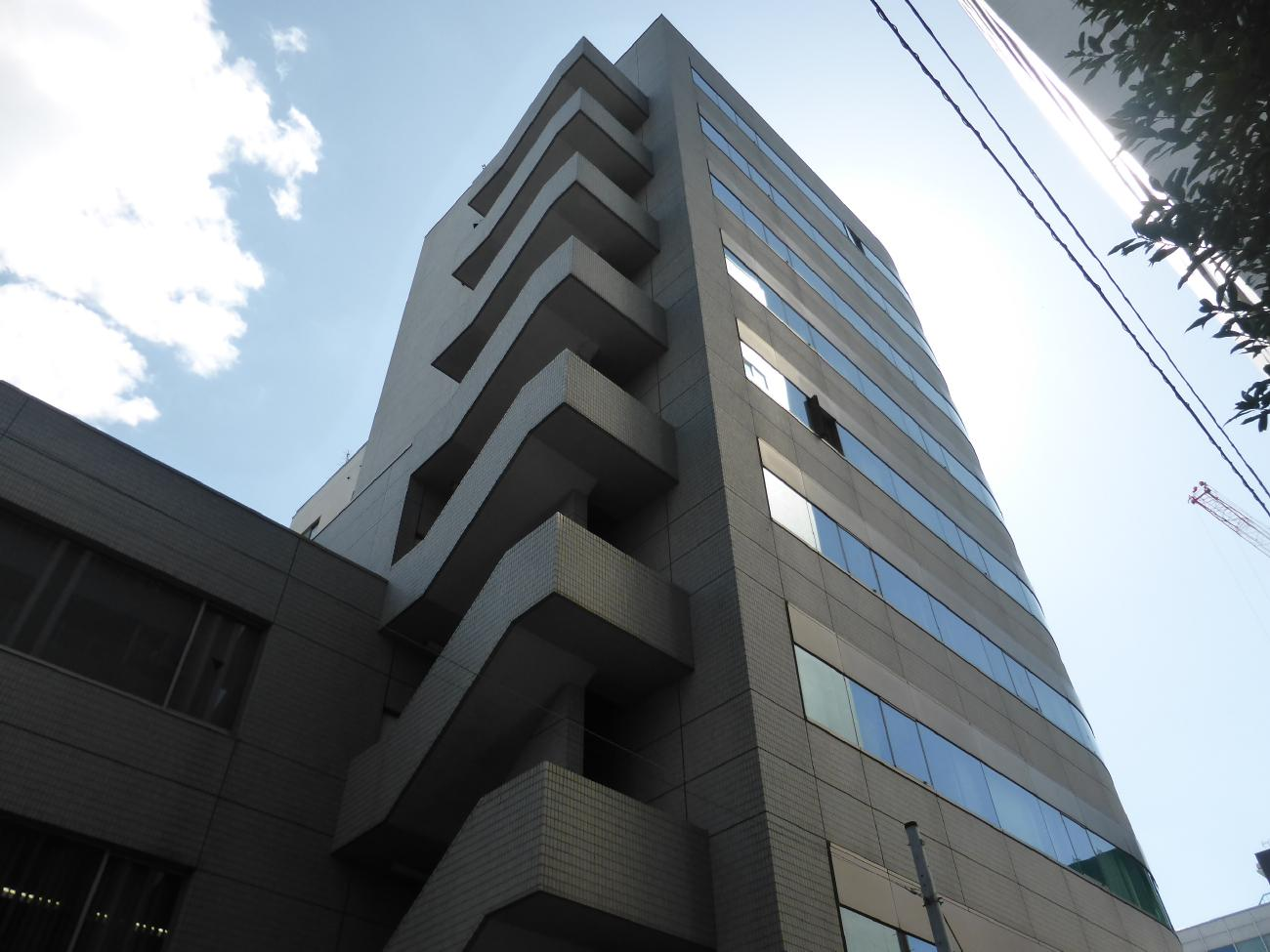
Embassy in Tokyo

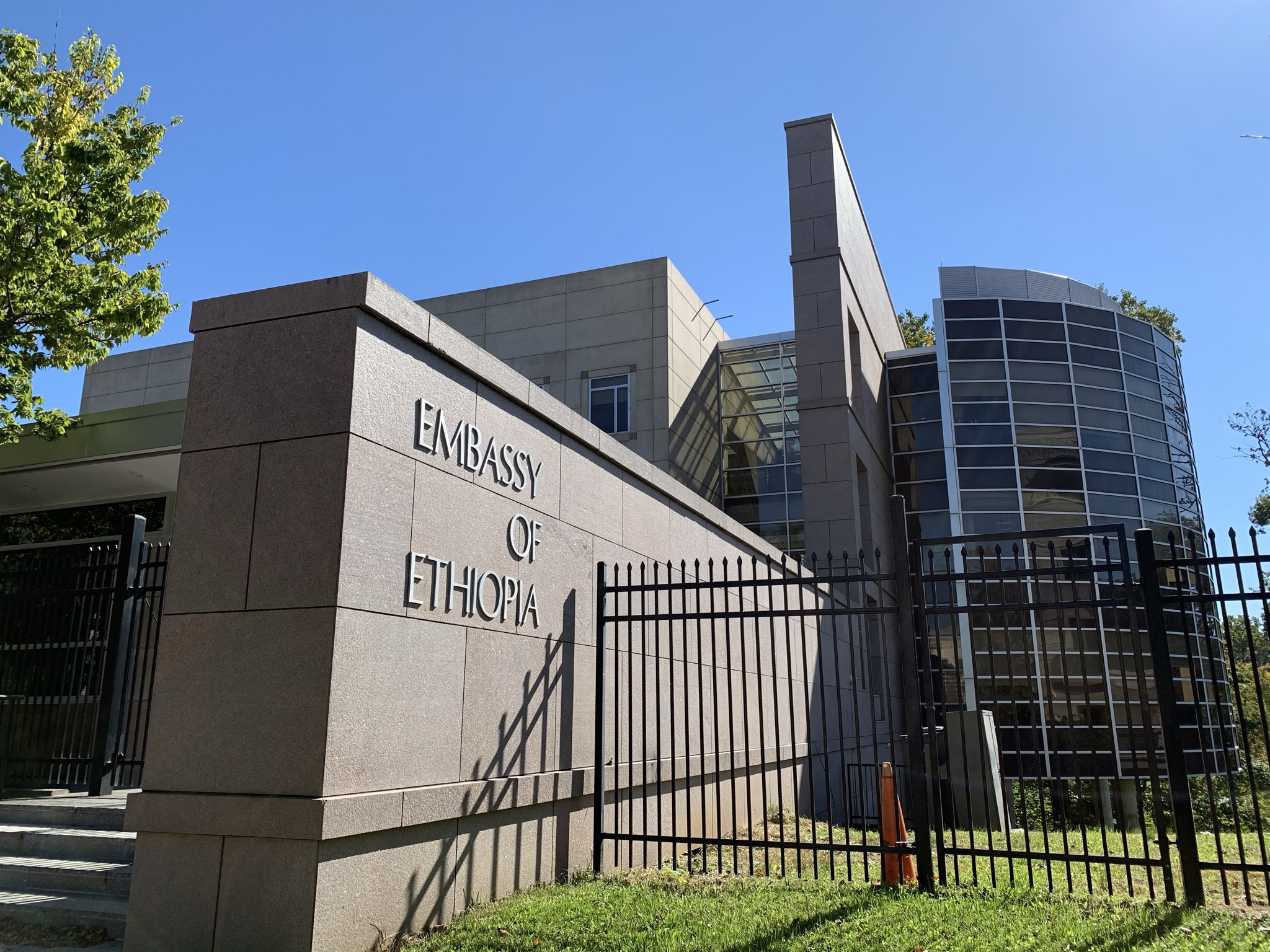
Embassy in Washington, D.C.

== Closed missions ==
=== Africa ===
Host country	Host city	Mission	Year closed	Ref.
Eritrea	Asmara	Embassy	2026	
Eritrea	Assab	Consulate	1996	
Libya	Tripoli	Embassy	Unknown	

=== Americas ===
Host country	Host city	Mission	Year closed	Ref.
Haiti	Port-au-Prince	Embassy	1967	
Mexico	Mexico City	Embassy	1990	
United States	Los Angeles	Consulate-General	2021	
United States	Saint Paul	Consulate-General	2021	

=== Asia ===
Host country	Host city	Mission	Year closed	Ref.
China	Chongqing	Consulate-General	2021	
China	Guangzhou	Consulate-General	2021	
China	Shanghai	Consulate-General	2021	
Iran	Tehran	Embassy	1997	
Jordan	Amman	Embassy	1970	
North Korea	Pyongyang	Embassy	2002	
South Yemen	Aden	Embassy	Unknown	
Yemen	Sana'a	Embassy	2017	

=== Europe ===
Host country	Host city	Mission	Year closed	Ref.
Austria	Vienna	Embassy	2010	
Czechoslovakia	Prague	Embassy (Note: The embassy was closed sometime before the Dissolution of Czechoslovakia in December 1992.)	1992	
East Germany	East Berlin	Embassy	Unknown	
Germany	Frankfurt	Consulate-General	2021	
Greece	Athens	Embassy	2010	
Ireland	Dublin	Embassy	2021	
Netherlands	The Hague	Embassy	2021	

== See also ==
- Foreign relations of Ethiopia
- List of diplomatic missions in Ethiopia
- Visa policy of Ethiopia
