= List of diplomatic missions in Ethiopia =

This is a list of diplomatic missions in Ethiopia. There are 124 embassies in Addis Ababa.

As Addis Ababa is the seat of the African Union, embassies resident therein are also accredited to this organization. However, some countries maintain permanent missions or delegations separate from their embassies to Ethiopia.

Honorary consulates and trade missions are excluded from this listing.

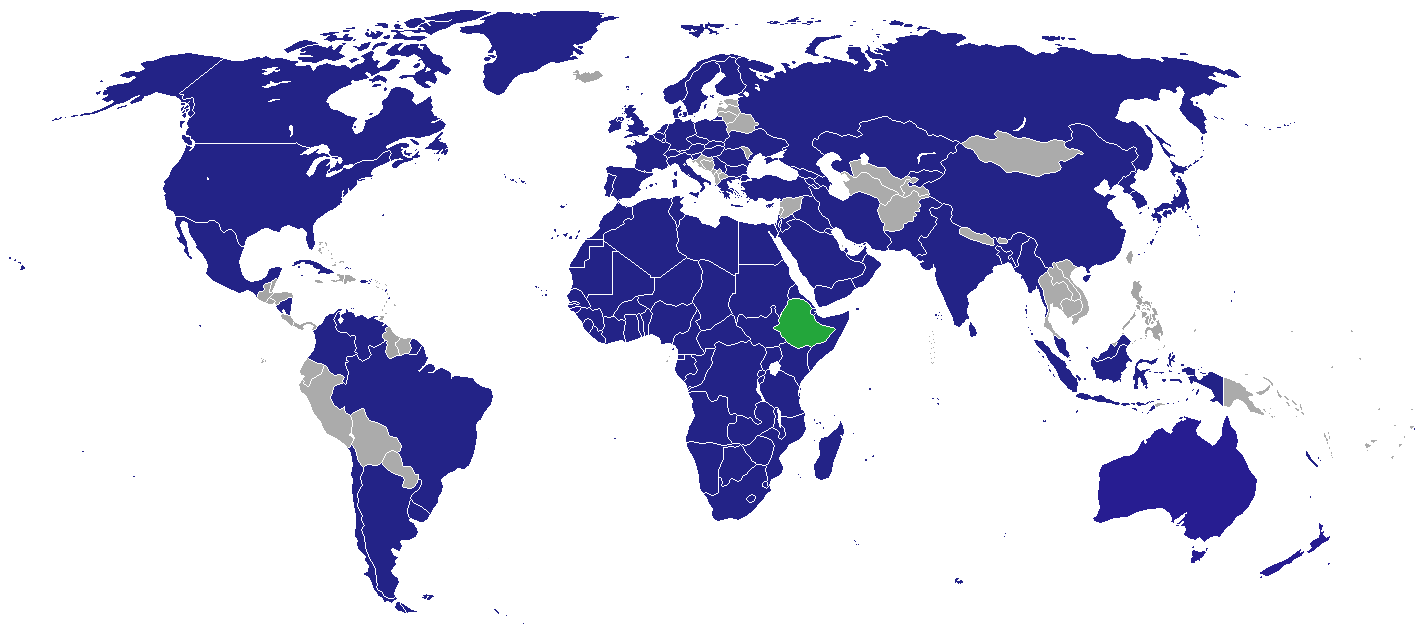
Diplomatic missions in Ethiopia

== Diplomatic missions in Addis Ababa ==
=== Embassies ===
1. Algeria
2. Angola
3. Argentina
4. Armenia
5. Australia
6. Austria
7. Azerbaijan
8. Bangladesh
9. Belgium
10. Benin
11. Botswana
12. Brazil
13. Bulgaria
14. Burkina Faso
15. Burundi
16. Cameroon
17. Canada
18. Cape Verde
19. Central African Republic
20. Chad
21. Chile
22. China
23. Colombia
24. Comoros
25. Congo-Brazzaville
26. Congo-Kinshasa
27. Cuba
28. Cyprus
29. Czechia
30. Denmark
31. Djibouti
32. Egypt
33. Equatorial Guinea
34. Eswatini
35. Finland
36. France
37. Gabon
38. Gambia
39. Georgia
40. Germany
41. Ghana
42. Greece
43. Guinea
44. Guinea-Bissau
45. Holy See
46. Hungary
47. India
48. Indonesia
49. Iran
50. Iraq
51. Ireland
52. Israel
53. Italy
54. Ivory Coast
55. Japan
56. Jordan
57. Kazakhstan
58. Kenya
59. Kuwait
60. Kyrgyzstan
61. Lesotho
62. Liberia
63. Libya
64. Luxembourg
65. Madagascar
66. Malawi
67. Malaysia
68. Mali
69. Malta
70. Mauritania
71. Mauritius
72. Mexico
73. Morocco
74. Mozambique
75. Myanmar
76. Namibia
77. Netherlands
78. New Zealand
79. Nicaragua
80. Niger
81. Nigeria
82. North Korea
83. Norway
84. Oman
85. Pakistan
86. Palestine
87. Poland
88. Portugal
89. Qatar
90. Romania
91. Russia
92. Rwanda
93. Sahrawi Republic
94. Saudi Arabia
95. Senegal
96. Serbia
97. Seychelles
98. Sierra Leone
99. Slovakia
100. Slovenia
101. Sovereign Order of Malta
102. Somalia
103. South Africa
104. South Korea
105. South Sudan
106. Spain
107. Sri Lanka
108. Sudan
109. Sweden
110. Switzerland
111. Tanzania
112. Togo
113. Tunisia
114. Turkey
115. Uganda
116. Ukraine
117. United Arab Emirates
118. United Kingdom
119. United States
120. Uruguay
121. Venezuela
122. Yemen
123. Zambia
124. Zimbabwe

=== Permanent missions/delegations to the African Union ===
1. China
2. Italy
3. Japan
4. Morocco
5. Norway
6. United States

=== Other delegations or missions ===
1. European Union (Delegation)
2. Somaliland (Representative office)
3. United Nations (Resident Coordinator's office)

=== Gallery ===
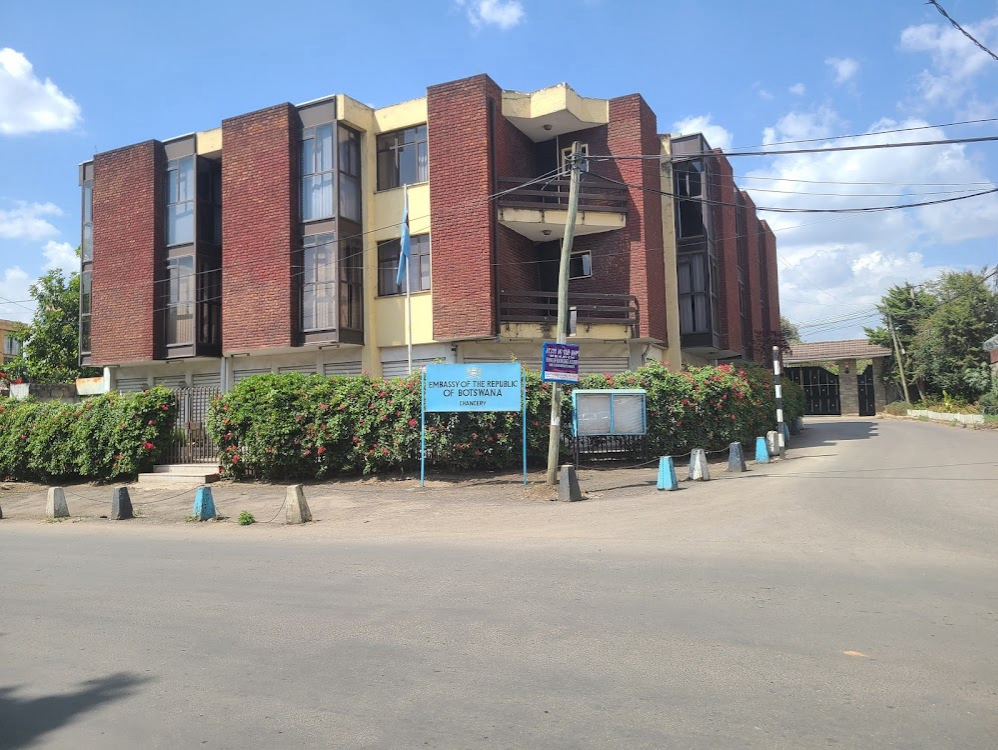
Embassy of Botswana

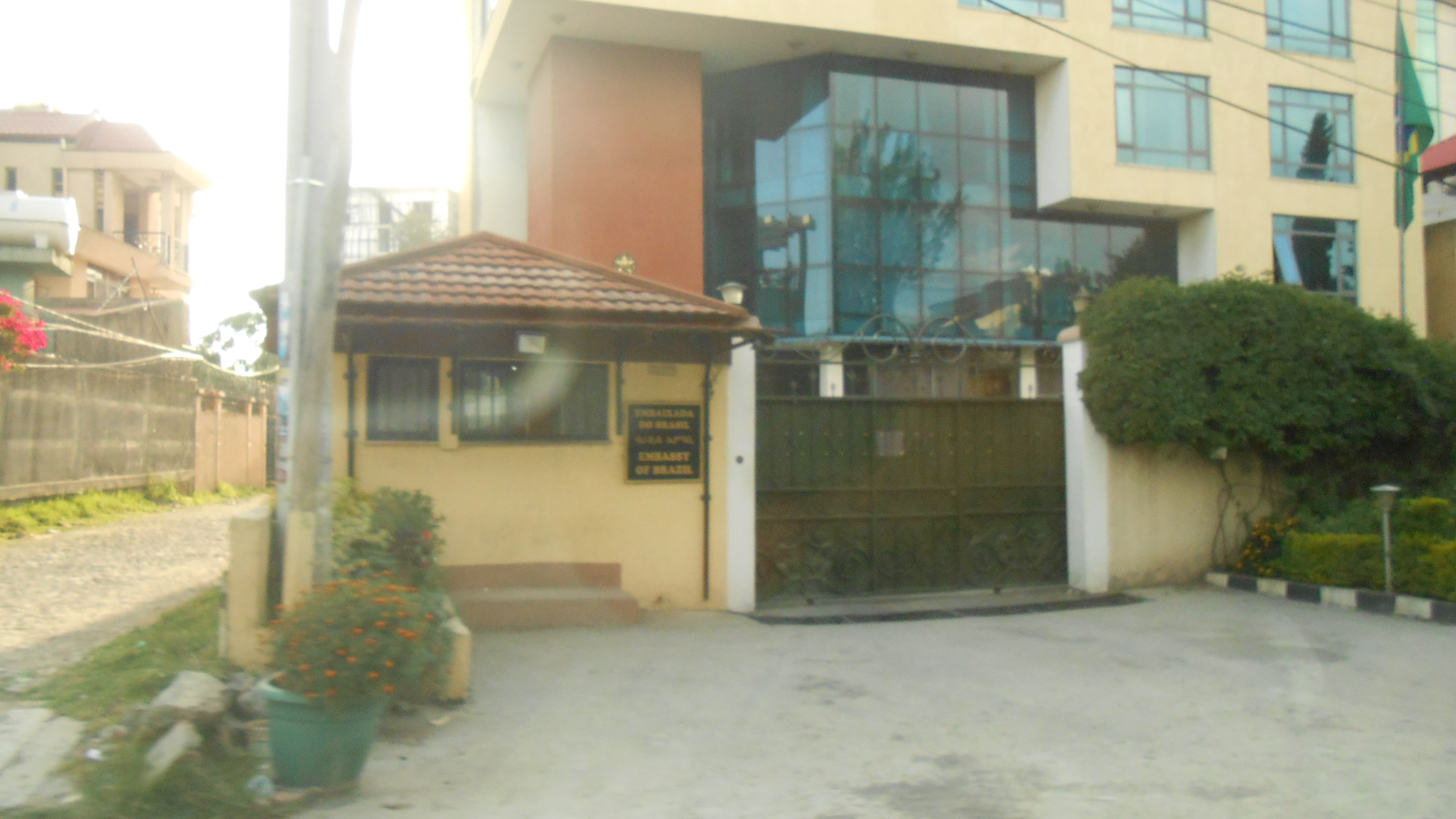
Embassy of Brazil

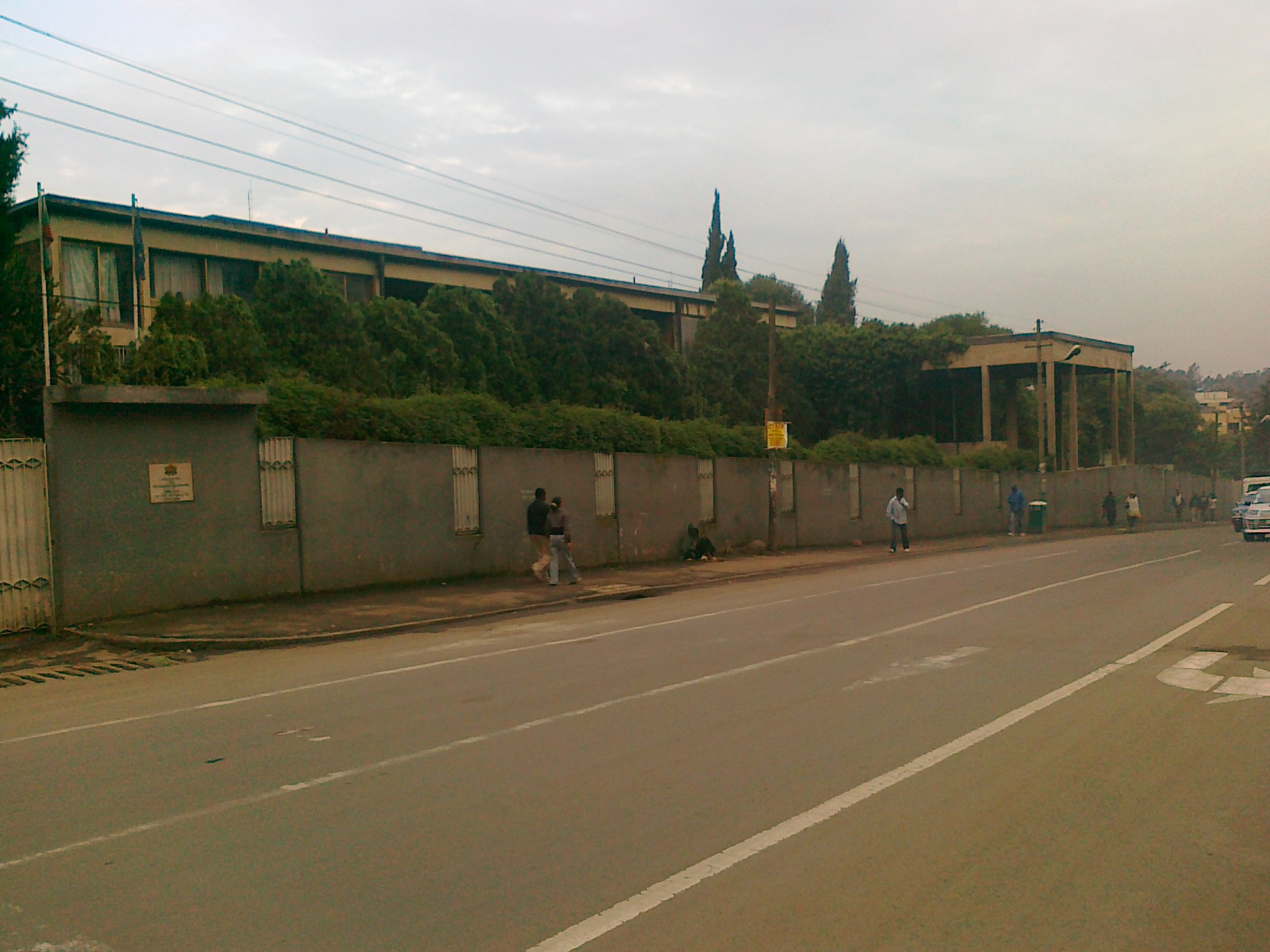
Embassy of Bulgaria

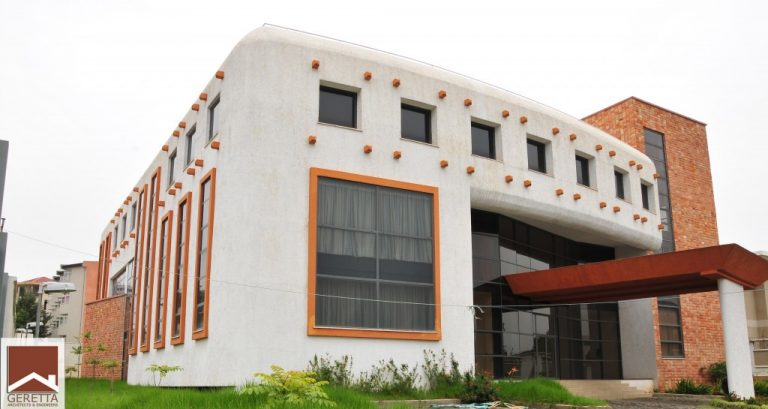
Embassy of Burkina Faso

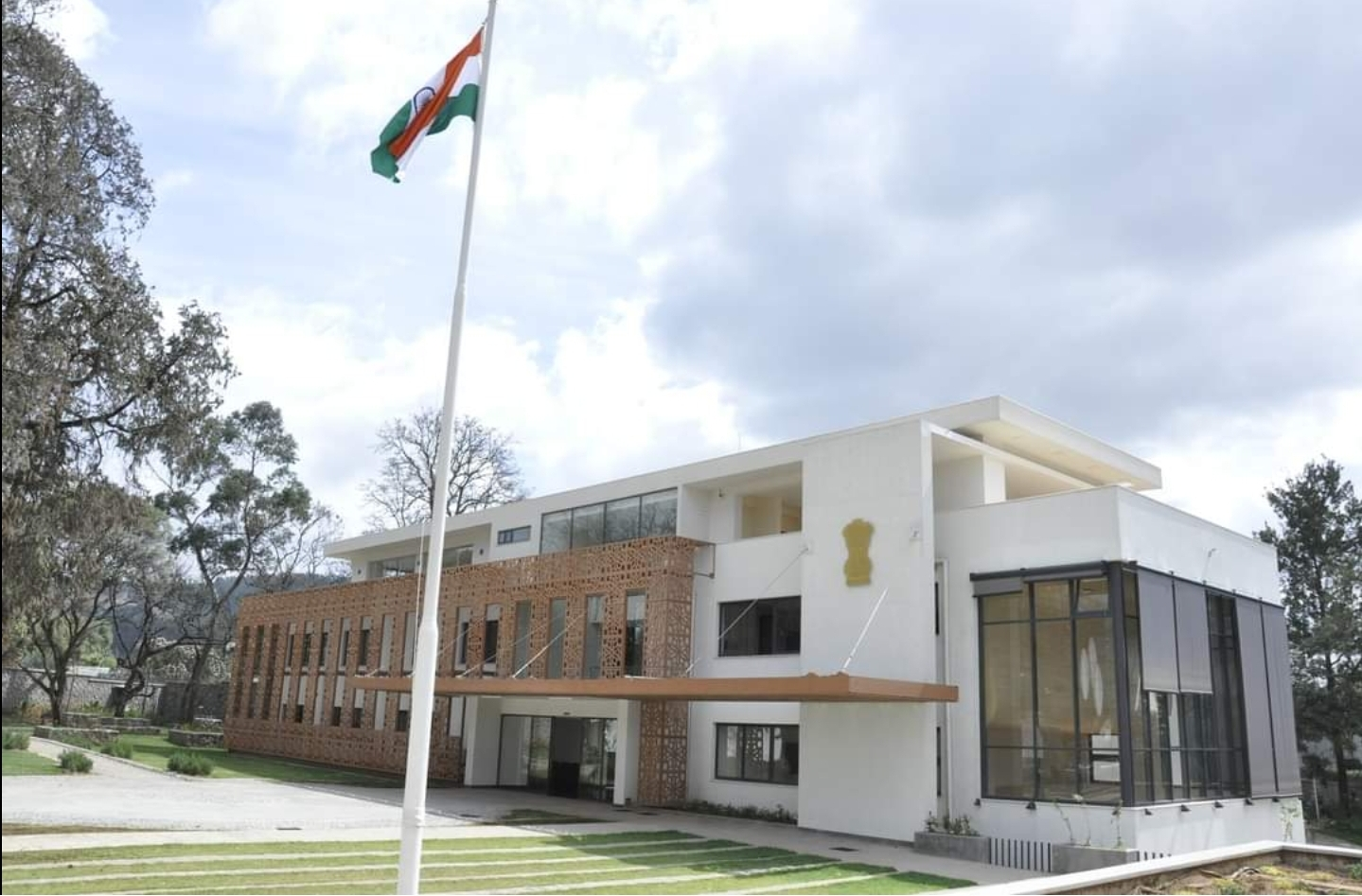
Embassy of India

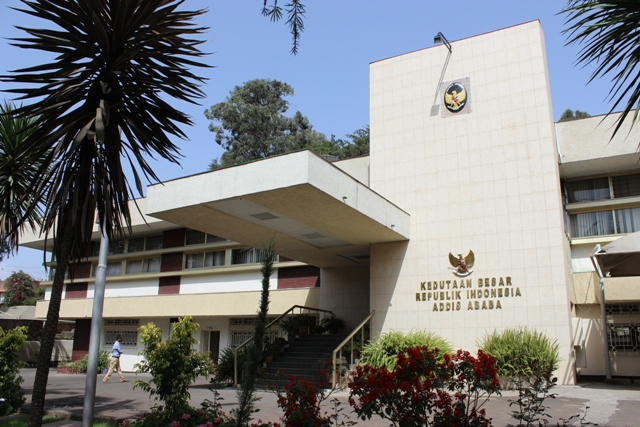
Embassy of Indonesia

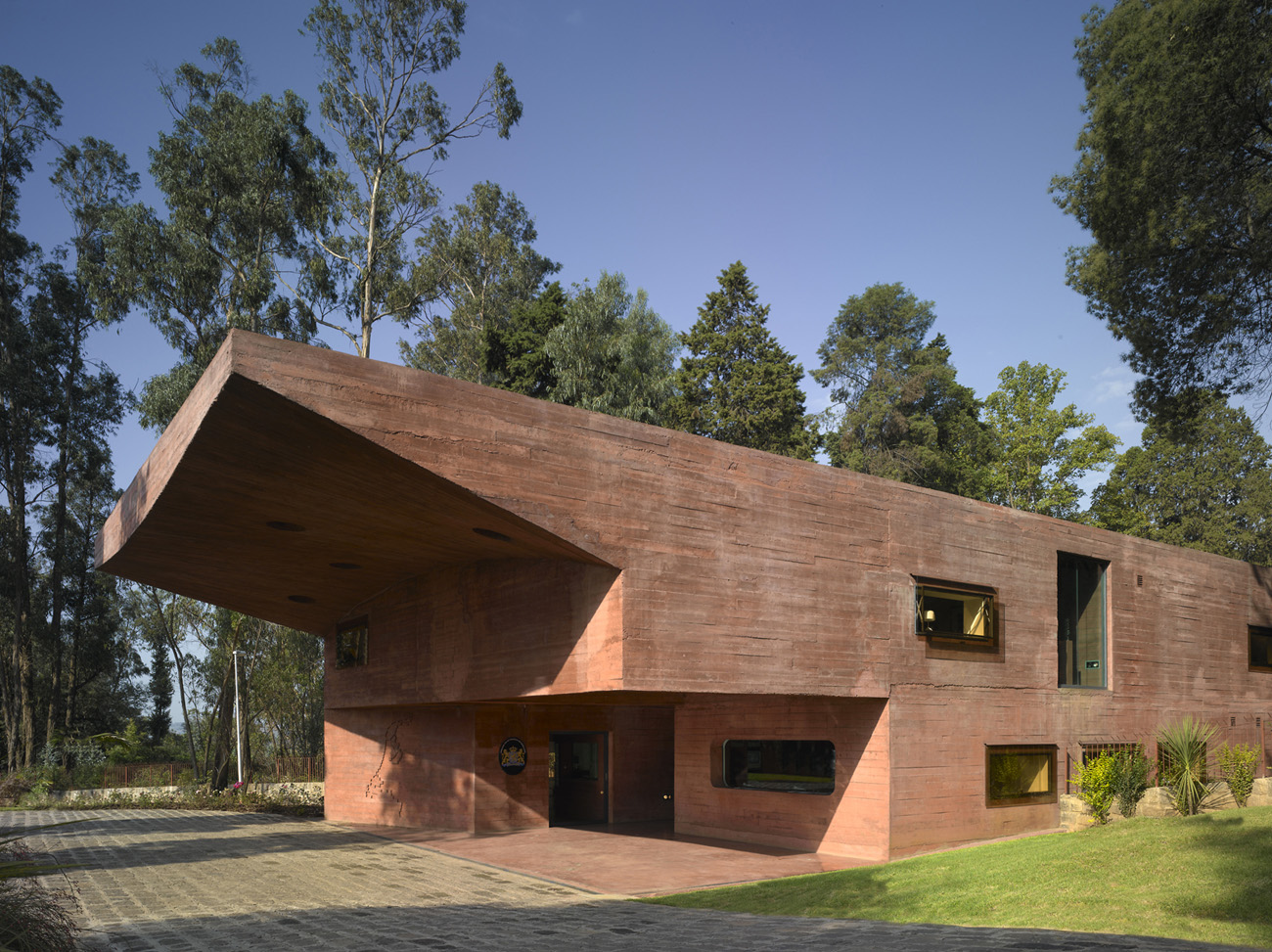
Embassy of the Netherlands

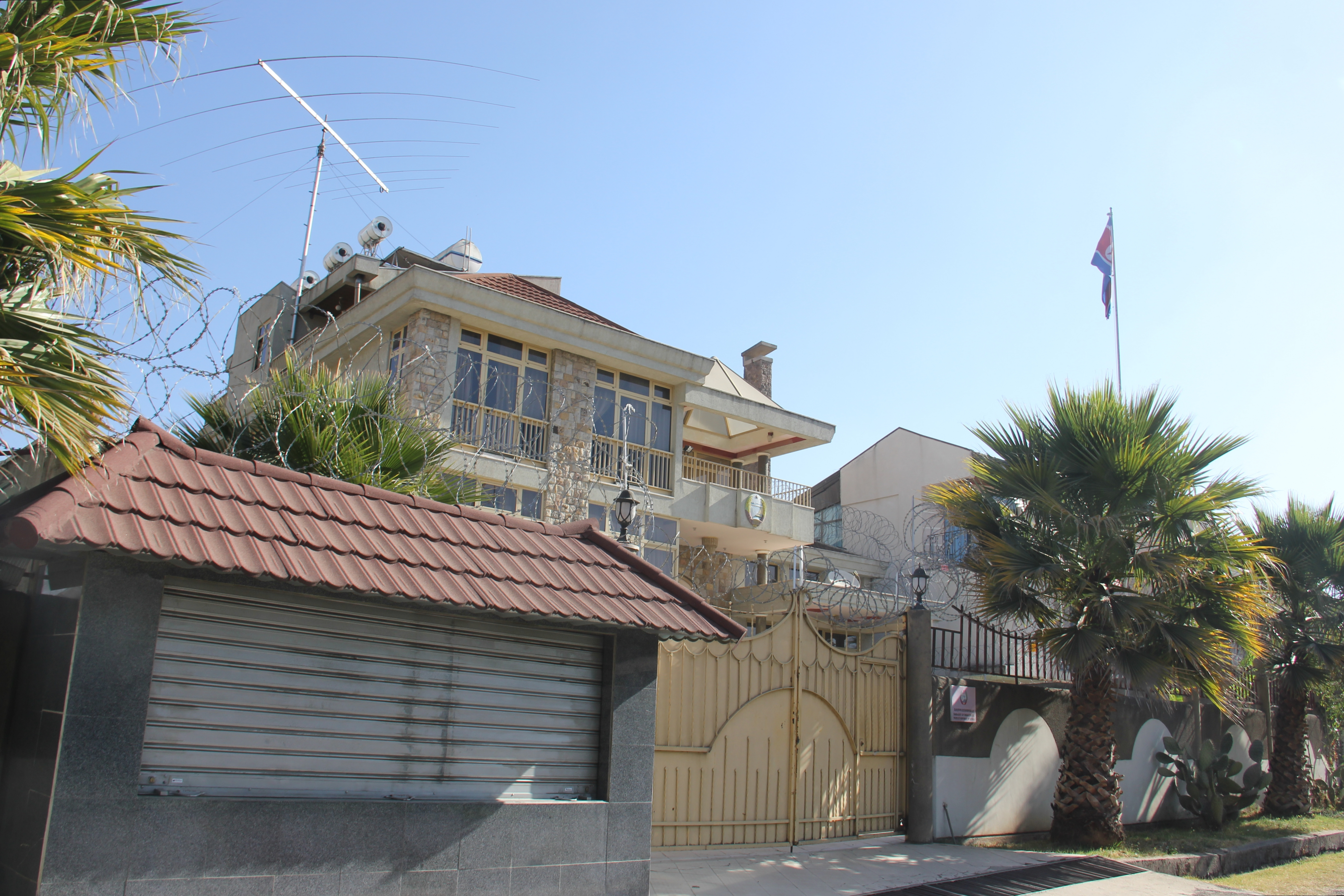
Embassy of North Korea

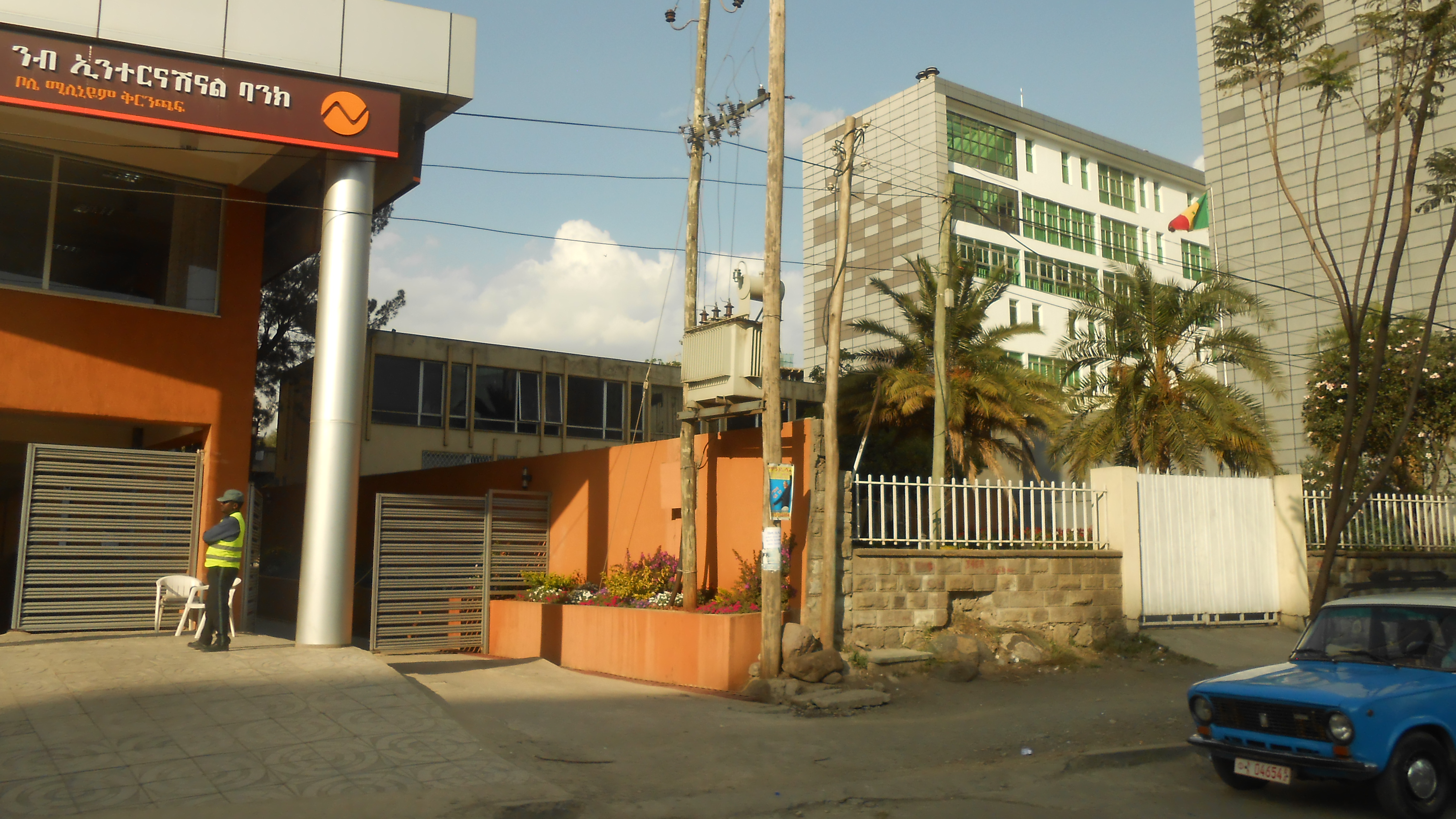
Embassy of Senegal

== Consulate-general ==
=== Dire Dawa ===
- Djibouti

== Embassies to open ==
- Croatia
- El Salvador
- Haiti
- Singapore
- Thailand
- Vietnam

== Non-resident embassies accredited to Ethiopia ==
=== Resident in Cairo, Egypt ===
1. Bosnia & Herzegovina
2. Croatia
3. Estonia
4. Lebanon
5. Nepal

=== Resident in Nairobi, Kenya ===
1. Barbados
2. Belarus
3. Costa Rica
4. Philippines
5. Thailand

=== Resident elsewhere ===
1. Cambodia (London)
2. Guatemala (London)
3. Iceland (Reykjavík)
4. Jamaica (Pretoria)
5. Maldives (Abu Dhabi)
6. Singapore (Singapore)
7. Turkmenistan (Ankara)
8. Uzbekistan (Doha)
9. Vietnam (Dar es Salaam)

=== Unverified ===
- Afghanistan
- Haiti (Pretoria)
- Laos (New Delhi)
- Latvia
- Lithuania (London)
- Mongolia
- Panama
- Peru (Algiers)
- Syria (Khartoum)

== Closed missions ==
Host city	Sending country	Mission	Year closed	Ref.
Addis Ababa	Belarus	Embassy	2018	
Addis Ababa	Ecuador	Embassy	2019	
Addis Ababa	Eritrea	Embassy	2026	
Addis Ababa	Fiji	Embassy	2019	
Addis Ababa	Jamaica	Embassy	1992	
Addis Ababa	Thailand	Embassy (Note: To be reopened.)	1981	
Addis Ababa	Vietnam	Embassy	1992	
Dire Dawa	France	Consulate	1980	
Harar	United Kingdom	Consulate	1960	
Mega	United Kingdom	Consulate	1960	

== See also ==
- Foreign relations of Ethiopia
- List of diplomatic missions of Ethiopia
