= Ethiopian nationality law =

Ethiopian Nationality Proclamation

Ethiopian Federal Parliamentary Assembly
- Enacted by: Government of Ethiopia
- Status: Current legislation

Ethiopian nationality law is regulated by the Constitution of Ethiopia, as amended; the Ethiopian Nationality Proclamation, and its revisions; and various international agreements to which the country is a signatory. These laws determine who is, or is eligible to be, a national of Ethiopia. The legal means to acquire nationality, formal legal membership in a nation, differ from the domestic relationship of rights and obligations between a national and the nation, known as citizenship. Nationality describes the relationship of an individual to the state under international law, whereas citizenship is the domestic relationship of an individual within the nation. Ethiopian nationality is typically obtained under the principle of jus sanguinis, born to parents with Ethiopian nationality. It can be granted to persons with an affiliation to the country, or to a permanent resident who has lived in the country for a given period of time through naturalization.

== Acquisition of nationality ==
Nationality can be acquired in Ethiopia at birth or later in life through naturalization.

=== By birth ===
Those who acquire nationality at birth include:

- Children born anywhere who have at least one parent who is an Ethiopian national; or
- Abandoned children or orphans discovered in the territory whose parents are unknown, but assumed to be Ethiopian.

=== By naturalization ===
Naturalization can be granted to persons who have resided in the territory for a sufficient period of time to confirm they understand one of the languages used in Ethiopia, and the customs and traditions of the society. General provisions are that applicants have good character and conduct; have no criminal convictions; and can legally and economically be self-sufficient. Applicants must have resided in the country for four years and renounce other nationality. Besides foreigners meeting the criteria, other persons who may be naturalized include:

- The spouse of an Ethiopian national after two years of marriage and a one-year residency period subsequent to the marriage;
- Adoptees whose parents are Ethiopian can choose to acquire nationality if the parents are residents in the territory;
- Minor children can be automatically naturalized when their parent acquires nationality; or
- Persons who have provided exceptional service to the nation may naturalize without other conditions.

== Loss of nationality ==
Ethiopian nationals can renounce their nationality pending approval by the state. The state does not allow persons who have not completed their military service or time for criminal prosecution to renounce their nationality. Nationals may be denaturalized in Ethiopia for acquiring dual nationality regardless of whether they are Ethiopian by origin or naturalized. Persons who previously had other nationality but wish to repatriate must renounce other nationality and establish a domicile in the country.

== Dual nationality ==
Dual nationality is not allowed in Ethiopia; however, provision of the law under Article 20 is that persons who have dual nationality are "considered solely an Ethiopian national until the loss of Ethiopian nationality". To facilitate members of the Ethiopian diaspora, persons who originally had Ethiopian nationality but now have foreign status may acquire a special identity card. Those who attained Eritrean nationality or renounced their Ethiopian nationality are not eligible. The card entitles them to benefits such as access to public services, entry without a visa, employment and residency rights, and the right to own real property. They are classified as "foreign nationals of Ethiopian origin".

== History ==
=== Ethiopian Empire (1270–1935) ===
In 1270, Yekuno Amlak founded the Christian, Solomonic dynasty of the Ethiopian Empire. Under his successors, the empire expanded and came into conflict with Muslim sultanates in the region. Ethiopian emperors were dedicated increasing both the power of the state and adherence to Orthodox Christianity. One of the primary reasons for the imperial drive to spread its influence was to better control trade in the region. Subjects, in exchange for paying taxes, received the protection of the emperor and his administrators, as well as socio-economic mobility in the hierarchical structure of the society. In 1517, the Ottoman Empire conquered Egypt and began an assault taking most of the Ethiopian territory along the Red Sea. Three years later at the request of the regent, Eleni of Ethiopia, a Portuguese mission arrived to establish an alliance and neutralize the Muslim expansion. For a century, the Portuguese and Ethiopian alliance fought together to preserve Ethiopian territory. In 1636, the capital was moved to Gondar and it was developed into a commercial center. An intense building and conquest phase followed, but by the eighteenth century, the empire was in decline.

During the Era of Princes from 1755 to 1855, twenty-eight sovereigns reigned over the empire. Regional rivalries and internal conflicts were characteristics of the period, but no serious attempts were made by the rivals to separate from the empire. The Tigray Region gained strength, but Shewa became the regional powerhouse in the nineteenth century. Commerce was important in attracting British and French traders to the area from the mid-1830s. The first three-quarters of the nineteenth century political disorder continued to disrupt economic development. Conflicts with Egypt and attempts at Muslim expansion into Ethiopian territory continued into the twentieth century. In 1886, Addis Ababa became the capital of Shewa and three years later in 1889, Menelik II was crowned emperor. That year, the Italians declared a protectorate over the coastline of the Red Sea and the following year proclaimed Eritrea as an Italian colony. The terms of the Treaty of Wuchale, which the Italians used to insist their authority over Ethiopia, led to the First Italo-Ethiopian War. Defeat of the Italians led to the signing in 1896, of the Treaty of Addis Ababa, which recognized the sovereignty of Ethiopia.

Menelik II continued southern expansion of the empire and embarked upon a campaign of modernizing the administrative institutions of Ethiopia. He established a ministerial system of governance, but it would be up to his successor Haile Selassie to promulgate the first constitution of Ethiopia. In 1930, he promulgated a Nationality Law and the following year, the constitution came into force. Under the Ethiopian Nationality Law of 1930, in force at the time, Ethiopian subjecthood was acquired through descent from an Ethiopian parent. If legitimate or legitimized, children derived the nationality of their father. Illegitimate children could derive nationality maternally, if the father did not legitimate them. If an Ethiopian woman was legally married to a foreigner, her children could only derive her nationality by proving that they had no other nationality, as married Ethiopian women automatically lost their status and derived the husband's nationality if his country conferred nationality upon her. Foreign women who married Ethiopians, automatically acquired Ethiopian status. Naturalization could be obtained by legal adults after a five-year residency by persons who were self-supporting, were fluent in Amharic, and had no criminal record. It did not automatically apply to the wife of an applicant.

=== Italian period (1935–1941) ===
Keen to expand its empire abroad, Italy invaded Ethiopia in October 1935 and formally established the colony of Italian East Africa (Italian: Africa Orientale Italiana), containing the territories of Ethiopia, Eritrea, and Somalia in 1936. Under the 1865 Civil Code, unity of the family was a driving foundation of the code, thus the emphasis was on descent. Nationality was derived paternally, regardless of where a child was born, unless the father was unknown. Foundlings born in the territory were presumed to have an Italian father and were granted nationality. Children born in Italy to foreigners who had lived in the territory for ten years, could acquire nationality at majority and those born in the territory to foreigners who did not meet the requisite residency could opt for Italian nationality at majority after service to the nation. Wives were required to follow the nationality of their husband. Italian women married to foreigners lost their Italian nationality and could only reacquire it if the marriage terminated and they established residence in Italy. Foreign women who married Italian men gained Italian nationality and retained it even after termination of the marriage. Nationality provisions were amended by Law 23 of 1901, which allowed children born in the territory or abroad who became foreigners because of a father's loss of nationality to acquire nationality without parliamentary intervention. Law no. 217 (known as Sonnino's Law), passed on 17 May 1906, allowed naturalization by royal decree if the Council of State supported the application and the applicant either resided in Italy or the colonies for six years, or had provided four years of service to the Italian state, or had been married to an Italian woman for three years.

Colonial subjecthood differed from that in the motherland. Persons born in or members of a tribe indigenous to the colony were Italian subjects but did not have the same civil rights as those born in Italy. If a colonial subject naturalized to attain civil rights, their status was intransmissible to other family members. Children born within a legal marriage between colonial subjects and metropolitan subjects automatically became Italian, though the majority of such unions were informal. Those children born outside of marriage, who were legitimated, or legally recognized and registered in official colonial birth records, were also automatically granted Italian nationality with full citizenship. Native women who married metropolitan Italians automatically acquired metropolitan status, but if a metropolitan woman married a native, she was able to retain her status, as it was deemed unlikely that she would be a dependent of a native man. In 1912, Italy introduced new nationality provisions (Law No. 555) to address Italians living outside of the motherland. It did not challenge the tenet of unity of nationality in the family for metropolitan nationals, and bestowed Italian nationality by descent from an Italian father. But, if the child was born abroad in a country that automatically granted its nationality through jus soli, Italian nationality could be renounced at majority. Adding this provision allowed Italy to perpetually recognize the nationality of emigrants and foster a sense of belonging to Italy, even if expatriates chose to no longer act as citizens. For foreigners, it reduced the general residency requirement to five years, or three years if in service to the state.

In 1933, an Italian statute formalized the practice of allowing illegitimate mixed-race children to choose metropolitan status upon reaching their majority. In 1936, Italy began a redefinition of subjecthood for Italian East Africa. The new statute retained the provision that a colonial subject was one not descended of a metropolitan Italian or national of any other state. It also continued the policy of attributing metropolitan nationality to legitimate or legitimated children of an Italian father. But, it eliminated provisions for mixed-race children to opt for metropolitan status at majority. Further, anti-miscegenation legislation passed in 1937 prohibited concubinage and another promulgated the following year banned formal marriages between metropolitan and native subjects. Mixed marriages became illegal and were punishable with a five year sentence upon conviction. Legislation passed in 1940 barred conferring metropolitan status on mixed-race, illegitimate, legitimate, legitimated children, or children of unknown parentage, unless they had reached age thirteen that year, had been raised as an Italian, and could confirm their good character.

=== British period (1941–1944) ===
During World War II, British led forces occupied Ethiopia in 1941 and established the British Military Administration. In December 1944, the Anglo-Ethiopian Agreement restored Ethiopia's independence, but left the matter of Eritrea unsettled. Under terms of the Hague Convention, Britain was to administer Eritrea in a manner to maintain its economic and social stability. To minimize their outlay in administration costs, the British primarily retained both Italian policy and bureaucrats. The policies they did implement were with the thought of partitioning Eritrea after the war to expand British interests and resulted in political unrest and economic instability. In 1950, the United Nations adopted a resolution that Eritrea was to be incorporated as an autonomous part of Ethiopia. Eduardo Anze Matienzo of Bolivia was selected to serve as the UN commissioner in Eritrea, implement the act to federate the nation with Ethiopia and draft a constitution after consultation with the populace. He began his consultation in May 1951, and completed the project giving Eritrea internal autonomy but subject to federal Ethiopian authority.

=== Restoration of the Ethiopian monarchy (1944–1974) ===
When the monarchy was restored, Selassie reinstated the constitution of 1931 and reopened the Parliament and government ministries. In 1952, Imperial Order No. 6, provided that Eritrea would form part of the Federation of Ethiopia and Eritrea and that any inhabitant of its territory who did not have other nationality were conferred Ethiopian nationality, under the terms of the 1930 Nationality Law. The Order also provided that persons born in Eritrea to one parent or grandparent who was Eritrean automatically became Ethiopian subjects, unless they stated a desire to retain a foreign nationality within six months of the date of the decree. In 1962, Ethiopia formally annulled the federation and abolished the Eritrean government, leading to the Eritrean War of Independence. Under the terms of the Imperial Order incorporating Eritrea as a province, blanket Ethiopian nationality was conferred on all inhabitants of Eritrea, unless they had foreign nationality.

=== Socialist period (1974–1991) ===
In 1974, when the Ethiopian monarchy was overthrown and a socialist system implemented, no new nationality law was propagated. Under Article 31 of the 1987 Constitution of the People's Democratic Republic of Ethiopia, persons who had a parent who was Ethiopian were Ethiopian. It also allowed foreigners or stateless persons to naturalize, but stated that provisions would be provided in a later law. The Dergue regime, a military junta which governed Ethiopia between 1974 and 1987, was oppressive and repressive, leading to large numbers of Ethiopians fleeing the country and living abroad as exiles. When the Dergue was ousted in 1991 at the end of the Ethiopian Civil War, the charter adopted to govern by the Ethiopian People's Revolutionary Democratic Front contained no nationality provisions. That same year, the Eritrean People's Liberation Front achieved de facto (unofficial) independence and expelled Ethiopians from its territory. The expulsions included government workers, military forces, and their families.

=== Post-transition (1991–present) ===
The Transitional Government of Ethiopia was established in 1992 and tasked with drafting a new constitution. By Proclamation No. 21 January 1992, Eritrea was declared as an independent state but until the 1993 referendum confirmed the creation of the new nation, inhabitants legally had dual nationality in both Ethiopia and Eritrea. Under the 1992 Eritrean Nationality Proclamation, children could acquire nationality equally from either parent. Those who were granted nationality were defined as having descended from a resident of Eritrea in 1933. Persons who arrived in the country between 1933 and 1951 could apply for a certificate of nationality and those who arrived after 1951 could apply for naturalization. In 1995, the Transitional Government of Ethiopia promulgated a constitution with a provision that granted nationality from birth to children of Ethiopian parents. The constitutional provisions did not allow for dual nationality, but opened a pathway for persons born abroad to Ethiopians in states which granted nationality based on birth in a territory to opt for Ethiopian nationality. Because of continuing uncertainty about nationality for Eritreans living in Ethiopia, in 1996, the governments of both countries proposed that to finalize the situation, people who were impacted should choose their nationality.

In 1998, the Eritrean–Ethiopian War broke out. Though border disputes and politico-economic tensions were the immediate the causes, denationalizations by both countries fueled the conflict. On 12 June 1998, large-scale deportations of Eritreans from Ethiopia began. Many of the deportees identified as Ethiopian and the rules were arbitrary. Some deportations were based on people for whom both parents were originally Eritrean, some were of children from mixed parentage, still others targeted only those with Eritrean fathers, or only those with Eritrean mothers. Ethiopia began using the rolls of voters who took part in the referendum as a basis to denationalize and expel Eritreans, but many were deported who had not taken part. Eritreans interned and deported Ethiopians residing in their territory later in the conflict. The war ended officially on 12 December 2000 when the Algiers Agreement was signed. In 2000, an independent body, Eritrea-Ethiopia Claims Commission, formed as part of the negotiated peace terms, found that as the State of Eritrea had not officially been sanctioned before the referendum, denaturalizing Ethiopians on the basis of participation in the referendum was unlawful under international law. The International Committee of the Red Cross supervised repatriations in both countries through 2002. The border demarcation was established in 2003, and though Ethiopia did not agree with the location, the peace held.

In 2003, Ethiopia passed a new nationality statute, replacing the 1930 Nationality Law, which had been in force for seven decades. The 2003 Nationality Proclamation eliminated gender inequalities in the previous legislation allowing children to derive nationality from either parent and spouses to equally attain Ethiopian nationality. Though affirming that nationality was obtained by descent, the legislation also provided for nationality of foundings born in the territory who had no discernible nationality, assuming that they had Ethiopian parents. It added for the first time clear provisions for children adopted as minors by Ethiopian parents to acquire nationality. Naturalization could be attained after a four-year residency period by those who met qualifications, or by persons who had performed exceptional service to the nation. A regulation detailing implementation of the new Nationality Proclamation, specifically referred to persons who were foreign nationals but with Ethiopian origin as persons who had Ethiopian parents, grandparents, or great-grandparents and who had not forfeited their Ethiopian nationality by acquiring Eritrean nationality.

In January 2004, Ethiopia issued a directive (Directive Issued to Determine the Residence Status of Eritrean Nationals Residing in Ethiopia) on nationality for Eritreans residing in Ethiopia. Those who posed no national security risk, had lived in the country prior to the independence of Eritrea, and did not have Eritrean nationality, could opt for Ethiopian nationality or permanent residency and obtain travel documents and passports. In 2019, Ethiopia adopted a Refugee Proclamation (No. 1110/2019), which allowed refugees within its borders to apply for naturalization under the provisions of the 2003 nationality law.
