= Ethiopian Origin ID Card =

Personal ID for Ethiopian diaspora

The Ethiopian Origin ID card (Yellow Card) is a document issued by Ethiopia to foreign nationals of Ethiopian origin.

The legal system of Ethiopia does not permit dual citizenship but the members of the Ethiopian diaspora may acquire the Ethiopian Origin ID Card, which gives them certain privileges. In particular, investors with the Yellow Card are considered to be domestic investors, with the corresponding rights. The Yellow Card holders do not need an entry visa, residency permit, or work permit for Ethiopia. They are not subject to restrictions applied to foreign nationals with respect to pension.
