= List of ambassadors of Indonesia to Egypt =

Ambassador of Indonesia to Egypt
- Duta Besar Indonesia untuk Mesir سفير إندونيسيا في مصر
- Emblem of the Ministry of Foreign Affairs

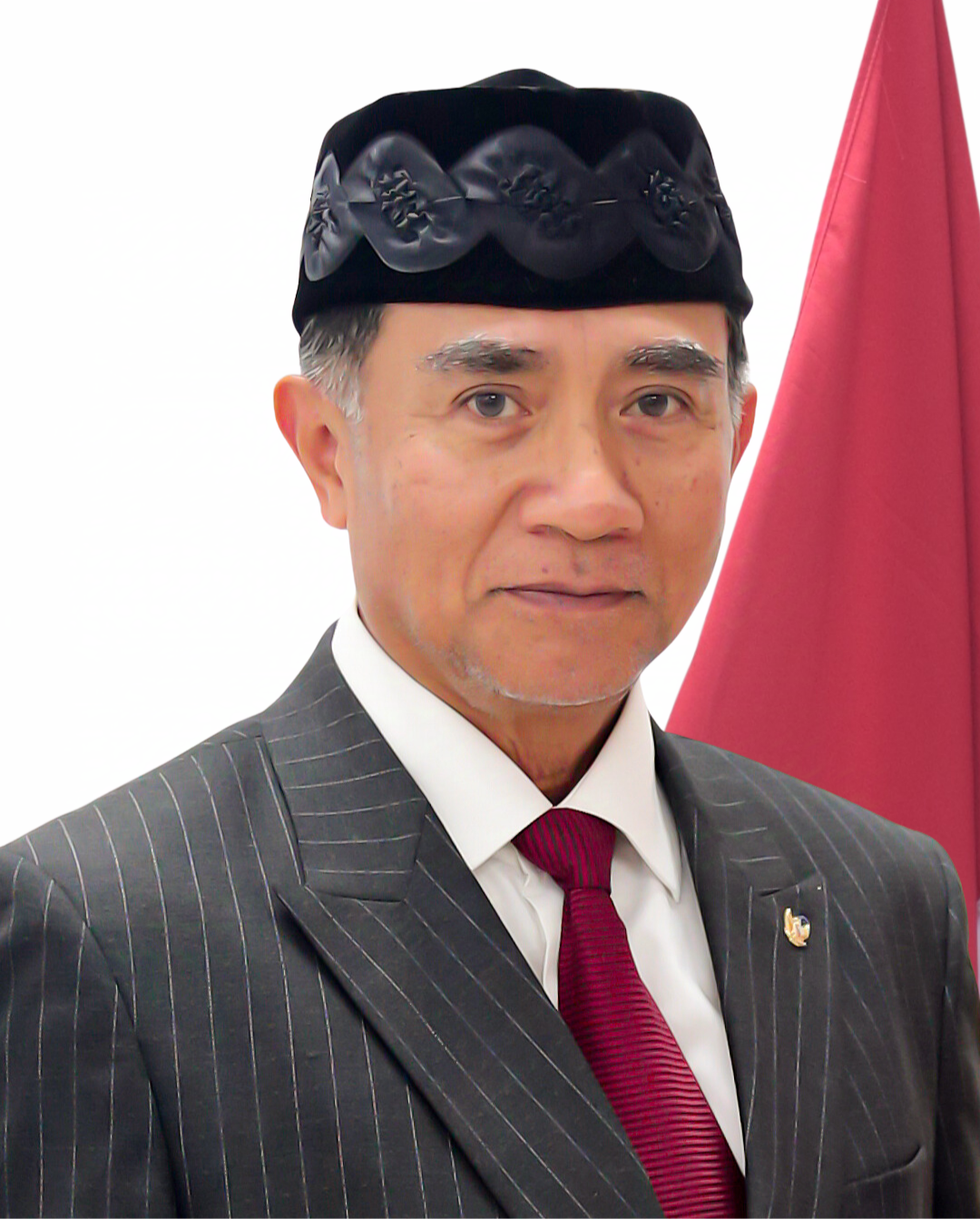
- Incumbent; Lutfi Rauf since 26 October 2020
- Ministry of Foreign Affairs; Embassy of Indonesia, Cairo
- Seat: Cairo, Egypt
- Appointer: President of Indonesia
- Inaugural holder: Rasjidi
- Formation: 1950
- Website: kemlu.go.id/cairo

The following are the list of Indonesian diplomats that served as Ambassador of the Republic of Indonesia to the Arab Republic of Egypt.

No.	Name	From	Until	Notes
1.	Rasjidi	1950	1952	
2.	Abdul Kadir	1952	1954	
3.	Tamzil Sutan Narajau	1955	1955	
4.	Mahmud Lamako Latjuba	1956	1958	(1909 – 1975)
5.	Sanusi Hardjadinata	1960	1964	R.H.
6.	Mas Isman	1964	1966	General Brigadier.
7.	Ahmad Yunus Mokoginta	1967	1970	General Lieutenant.
8.	Mohammad Syarief Padmadisastra	1971	1975	Drs.
9.	Fuad Hassan	1976	1980	Prof. Dr.
10.	Ferdy Salim	1980	1982	
11.	Barkah Tirtadidjaja	1983	1986	General Major.
12.	R. Ahmad Djumiril	1986	1990	
13.	Abdoerachman Djajaprawira	1990	1993	
14.	Boer Mauna	1994	1997	Dr.
15.	Hassan Wirajuda	1997	1998	
16.	Quraish Shihab	1999	2002	Prof. Dr.
17.	Bachtiar Aly	2002	2005	Prof. Dr.
18.	Abdurrahman Mohammad Fachir	2007	2011	
19.	Nurfaizi Suwandi	2012	2016	
20.	Helmy Fauzy	2016	2020	
21.	Lutfi Rauf	2020	now	

== Sources ==
- https://web.archive.org/web/20150208161159/http://www.kemlu.go.id/cairo/Lists/AboutUs/DispForm.aspx?ID=6&ContentTypeId=0x0100E498203E4E1AF24C971D7D007AD90B09
