= Embassy of Indonesia, Beirut =

Embassy of the Republic of Indonesia in Beirut Kedutaan Besar Republik Indonesia di Beirut

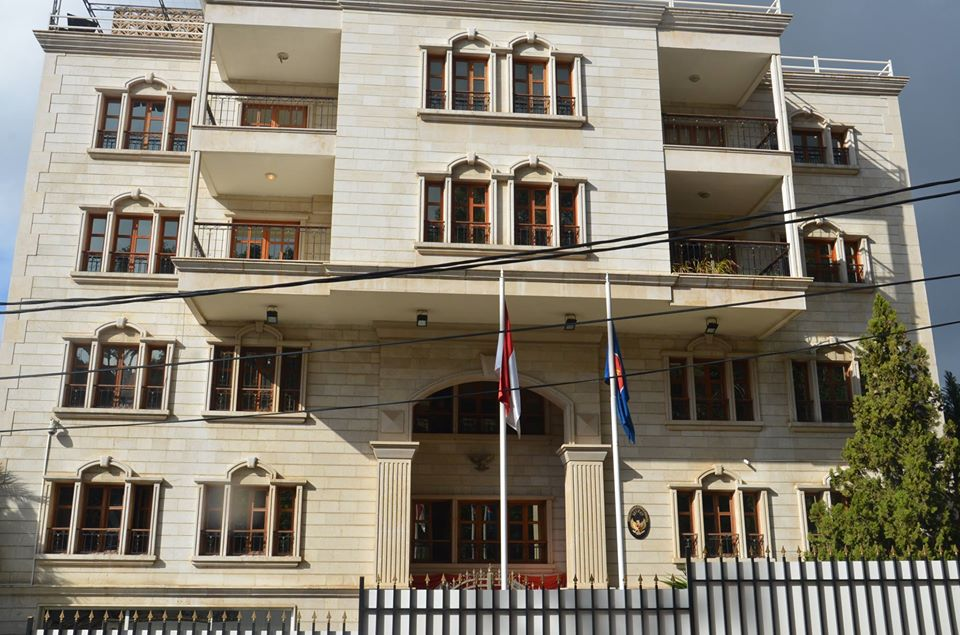
- Location: Beirut, Lebanon
- Address: Presidential Palace Avenue; Rue 68 Sector 3, No. 3237; Baabda, Lebanon
- Coordinates: 33.845196°N 35.541779°E
- Ambassador: Hajriyanto Y. Thohari
- Website: kemlu.go.id/beirut/en/

The Embassy of the Republic of Indonesia in Beirut (Indonesian: Kedutaan Besar Republik Indonesia di Beirut) is the diplomatic mission of the Republic of Indonesia to the Republic of Lebanon. The first Indonesian ambassador to Lebanon was Dalindra Aman in 1996. The current ambassador, Hajriyanto Y. Thohari, was appointed by President Joko Widodo on 7 January 2019.

== History ==
Since the 1950s, Indonesia has had diplomatic relations with Lebanon. On 11 November 1952, the Indonesian embassy in Cairo, Egypt was concurrently accredited to Lebanon. Around 1955, the Indonesian government opened a diplomatic mission in Beirut, but it did not have embassy status. Due to the start of the civil war in Lebanon, the Indonesian diplomatic mission in Beirut was closed in 1976. At the same time, the Indonesian embassy accredited to Lebanon also changed from the embassy in Cairo to the embassy in Damascus, Syria. The diplomatic mission in Beirut was reopened as an embassy in 1996 with Dalindra Aman as the first Indonesian ambassador to Lebanon.

== See also ==
- Indonesia–Lebanon relations
- List of diplomatic missions of Indonesia
- List of diplomatic missions in Lebanon
