= Fachir =

Fachir is a surname. Notable people with the surname include:

- Abdurrahman Mohammad Fachir, Indonesian career diplomat
- Ifa Fachir (fl. 2002–2011), keyboard player for Indonesian band Maliq & D'Essentials
