= Abdurrahman Mohammad Fachir =

Indonesian ambassador (born 1957)

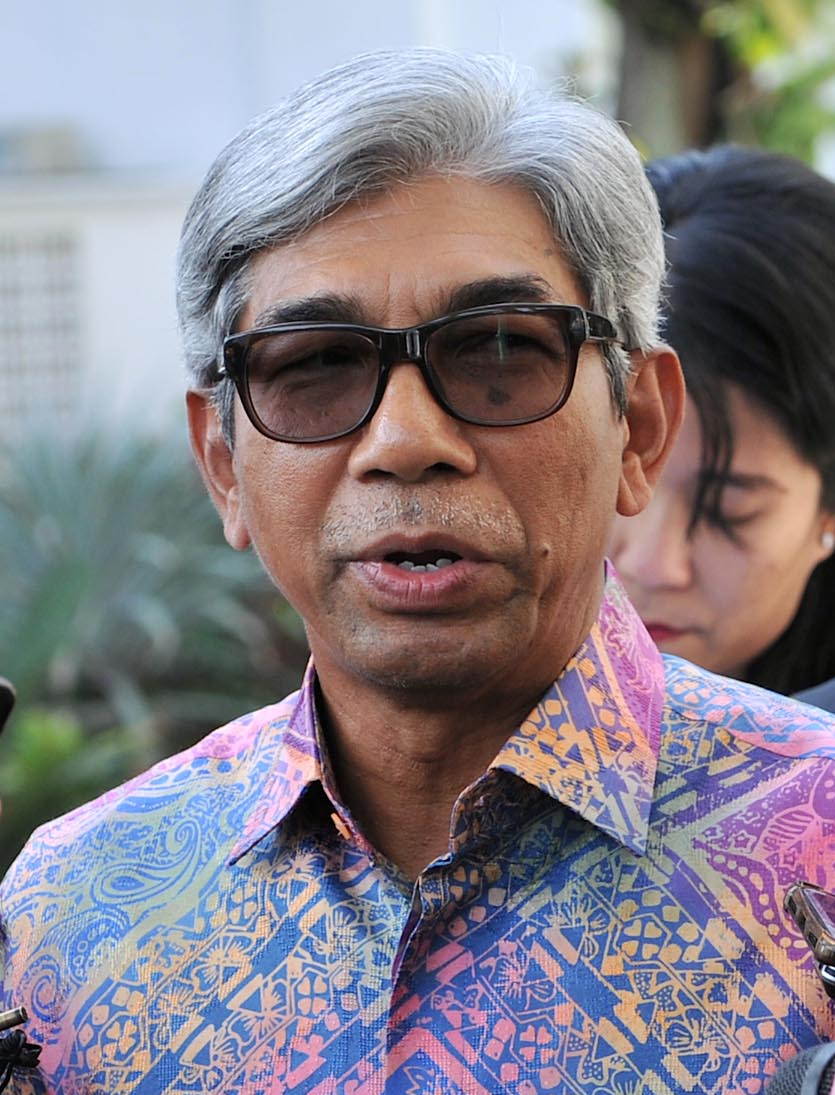
- Fachir in 2018

7th Vice Minister of Foreign Affairs of Indonesia
- In office 27 October 2014 – 20 October 2019
- President: Joko Widodo
- Minister: Retno Marsudi
- Preceded by: Dino Patti Djalal
- Succeeded by: Mahendra Siregar

Ambassador of Indonesia to Saudi Arabia
- In office 14 February 2014 – 27 October 2014
- President: Susilo Bambang Yudhoyono
- Preceded by: Gatot Abdullah Mansyur
- Succeeded by: Agus Maftuh Abegebriel

Director General of Information and Public Diplomacy
- In office 25 October 2011 – 7 March 2014
- Minister: Marty Natalegawa
- Preceded by: Andri Hadi
- Succeeded by: Dian Triansyah Djani (acting); Esti Andayani

Ambassador of Indonesia to Egypt
- In office 6 September 2007 – June 2011
- President: Susilo Bambang Yudhoyono
- Preceded by: Bachtiar Aly
- Succeeded by: Nurfaizi Suwandi

Personal details
- Born: 26 November 1957 (age 68) Banjarmasin, South Kalimantan, Indonesia
- Spouse: Yasmin Sukmawira
- Children: 3 (including Ifa Fachir)
- Education: Syarif Hidayatullah State Islamic University Jakarta (Drs.); Gadjah Mada University (Dr.)

Abdurrahman Mohammad Fachir (born 26 November 1957) is an Indonesian career diplomat who served as the vice foreign minister from 2014 to 2019 during foreign minister Retno Marsudi's first term. Previously, Fachir was the ambassador to Egypt from 2007 to 2011 and director general of information and public diplomacy from 2011 to 2014, with a seven-month stint as ambassador to Saudi Arabia in 2014.

== Early life and education ==
Abdurrahman was born on 26 November 1957 in Banjarmasin. He completed primary and secondary education at his birthplace, before heading for Java to pursue further Islamic education in 1972. He completed middle school at the Ngabar pesantren (Islamic boarding school) and high school at the Gontor modern pesantren in 1975 and 1978. He pursued higher education at the Syarif Hidayatullah State Islamic Institute Jakarta (now university).

Abdurrahman took part in the Ship for Southeast Asian and Japanese Youth Program (SSEAYP), a student exchange program between ASEAN countries and Japan, on his first year. Abdurrahman later commended the program for providing him confidence to pursue career in diplomacy. Unlike his peers who was active in politics, Abdurrahman joined a band and the university's Islamic Students Art Organization (Lembaga Seni Mahasiswa Islam, LSMI), which he chaired from 1981 to 1982. He graduated with a doctorandus in 1983. While serving as ambassador to Egypt, Abdurrahman enrolled on the Middle East doctorate programme at the Gadjah Mada University. He graduated in May 2015 with a thesis on the reciprocal relations between Indonesia and Egypt from 1950 to 2010.

== Diplomatic career ==
Abdurrahman entered diplomatic service as a civil servant in November 1983. By 1985, he became the acting chief of the United Nations Security Council section in the foreign department. Abdurrahman was then sent to the Indonesian embassy in Iraq for his maiden overseas posting, where he was in charge of socio-cultural and information matters with the diplomatic rank of third secretary. Upon learning of his appointment amidst the Iran–Iraq War, Abdurrahman delayed informing his wife, who was in pregnancy, until a month later. As his wife was pregnant at that time, Fachir left his wife and departed for Iraq in August that year, where he temporarily resided at the Novotel in Baghdad.

Several days after his arrival, a ceasefire was declared. Abdurrahman later remarked that he was frequently surprised by the celebratory gunfires in the hotel, which severely disturbed his sleep. After Iraq invaded Kuwait in 1990, Saddam Hussein instructed the closure of all embassies in the country. The embassy evacuated all Indonesians in Kuwait and later Indonesians in Iraq. As there were four hundred Indonesians, the evacuation required seven back-to-back trips. During the evacuation process, he encountered child soldiers guarding checkpoints all over the border of the two countries. His car also got shot, but he managed to recover. Three months after sending back all of the evacuated Indonesians back to the country, he returned to Baghdad and continued his service. On one occasion, while he went to Jordan for a work visit, his house got searched and all of his family's belongings were ransacked. The assault left his wife injured and left his eldest child, who at that time was in elementary school, traumatized by door knocks.

He returned to Indonesia in 1992 and, after a three-year domestic posting at the executive agency of the Non-Aligned Movement, was sent to the permanent mission to the United Nations in New York, where he was in service from 1995 to 1999. During this period he was put in charge of Non-Aligned Movement matters with the diplomatic rank of first secretary. Following his return, he was assigned to the foreign department as deputy director for political and security affairs in the directorate of international organizations. In relation to his position, Abdurrahman became the secretary of the interagency committee for international security and disarmament. Throughout his service in New York and as deputy director, Abdurrahman took part in a number of conferences relating to the United Nations, Non-Aligned Movement, as well as disarmament-related topics, and was also entrusted to organize seminars and workshops on the issues on a regional and national level. In July 2002, Abdurrahman was seconded to the state secretariat as the chief of manuscript and translation bureau, where he also acted as one of President Megawati Sukarnoputri's translator.

=== Deputy chief of mission in Malaysia ===
Following a brief stint in New York, in 2004 Abdurrahman became the deputy chief of mission of the embassy in Malaysia, serving under ambassador Rusdihardjo. Shortly after the Malaysian government issued an amnesty on overstays, Fachir appealed to Indonesian illegal migrant workers to return home before the end of the deadline on 31 December 2004. After the deadline passed, Fachir led the embassy's efforts in encouraging illegal migrant workers to come out from their hiding. In 2006, Fachir organized the deportation of around 200 thousand Indonesian illegal immigrants. In February 2007, Fachir became the embassy's charge d'affaires ad interim after Rusdihardjo's term ended. Fachir contributed in setting up a 24-hour hotline for Indonesian migrant workers after reports of several Indonesian maids fleeing from the abuse they suffered from their employer.

=== Ambassador to Egypt ===
Abdurrahman's ephemeral tenure as charge d'affaires ad interim ended after he was sworn in as ambassador to Egypt on 6 September 2007. He arrived in Cairo on 30 October 2007 and presented his credentials to president Hosni Mubarak shortly later. As Abdurrahman, Fachir initiated the construction of a dormitory for Indonesian students at Al-Azhar University to bolster graduation rates, which at that time was as low as forty percent. The Al-Azhar president Ahmed el-Tayeb went beyond Abdurrahman's permission for the dormitory being constructed in proximity by allowing it to be established inside the university instead. Abdurrahman later remarked that it took one hour to lobby the Al-Azhar president for the dormitory and a year to convince the Indonesian stakeholders. Fachir also spearhead the creation of Simadu, an integrated database of Indonesian students studying in Egypt. At the end of his tenure, the graduation rate had reached a record high of 75%. At his farewell call in June 2011, el-Tayeb quipped that the graduation rate could reach a perfect 100% had if Fachir's term was extended to five years. Bilateral trade volume also doubled a year after he took office. Several months before his end of term, Abdurrahman led the evacuation of Indonesians from Egypt to mitigate them from the impact of the 2011 Egyptian revolution.

=== Director General of Information and Public Diplomacy ===
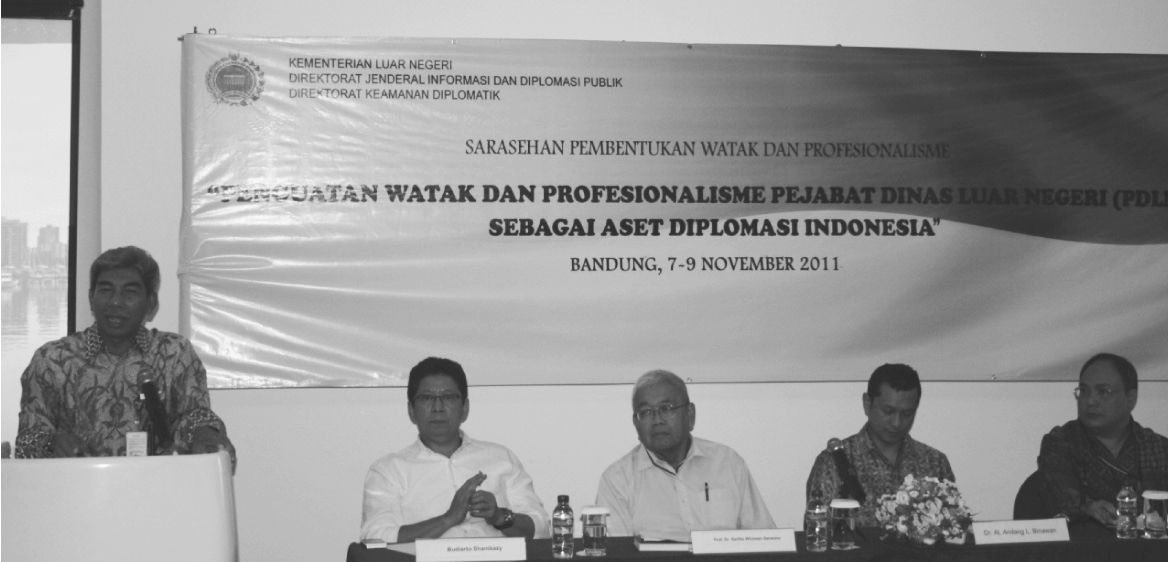
Abdurrahman delivering a speech at an internal seminar in 2012.

Four months after his departure, on 25 October 2011 Abdurrahman became the director general of public diplomacy, replacing Andri Hadi who became ambassador to Singapore. At the end of his tenure on 7 March 2014, foreign minister Marty Natalegawa credited him with consolidating and providing a clear roadmap for Indonesia's technical cooperation as well as raising the profile of the Bali Democracy Forum.

=== Ambassador to Saudi Arabia ===
In September 2013, Abdurrahman was nominated by President Susilo Bambang Yudhoyono as ambassador to Saudi Arabia in Riyadh. After undergoing an assessment by the House of Representative's first commission on 18 September 2013, Fachir was sworn in on 14 February 2014. Shortly before his departure, Abdurrahman, who described himself as a diplomat specializing in rescuing Indonesian citizens, intended to change the perception of Indonesia as a contributor of pilgrims instead of migrants. Upon arriving on 25 March, he received his duties from charge d'affaires ad interim Eddy Basuki a day after, and presented copies of his credentials to foreign minister Abdulaziz bin Abdullah Al Saud on the last day of the month. He officially began his duties after presenting his credentials to king Abdullah of Saudi Arabia on 29 August 2014. At the credentials presentation, Fachir invited Abdullah for a visit to Indonesia, to which the king replied Inshallah. During his brief tenure, Abdurrahman handled the legal case of Satinah, an Indonesian maid who was facing a death sentence.

=== Deputy foreign minister ===
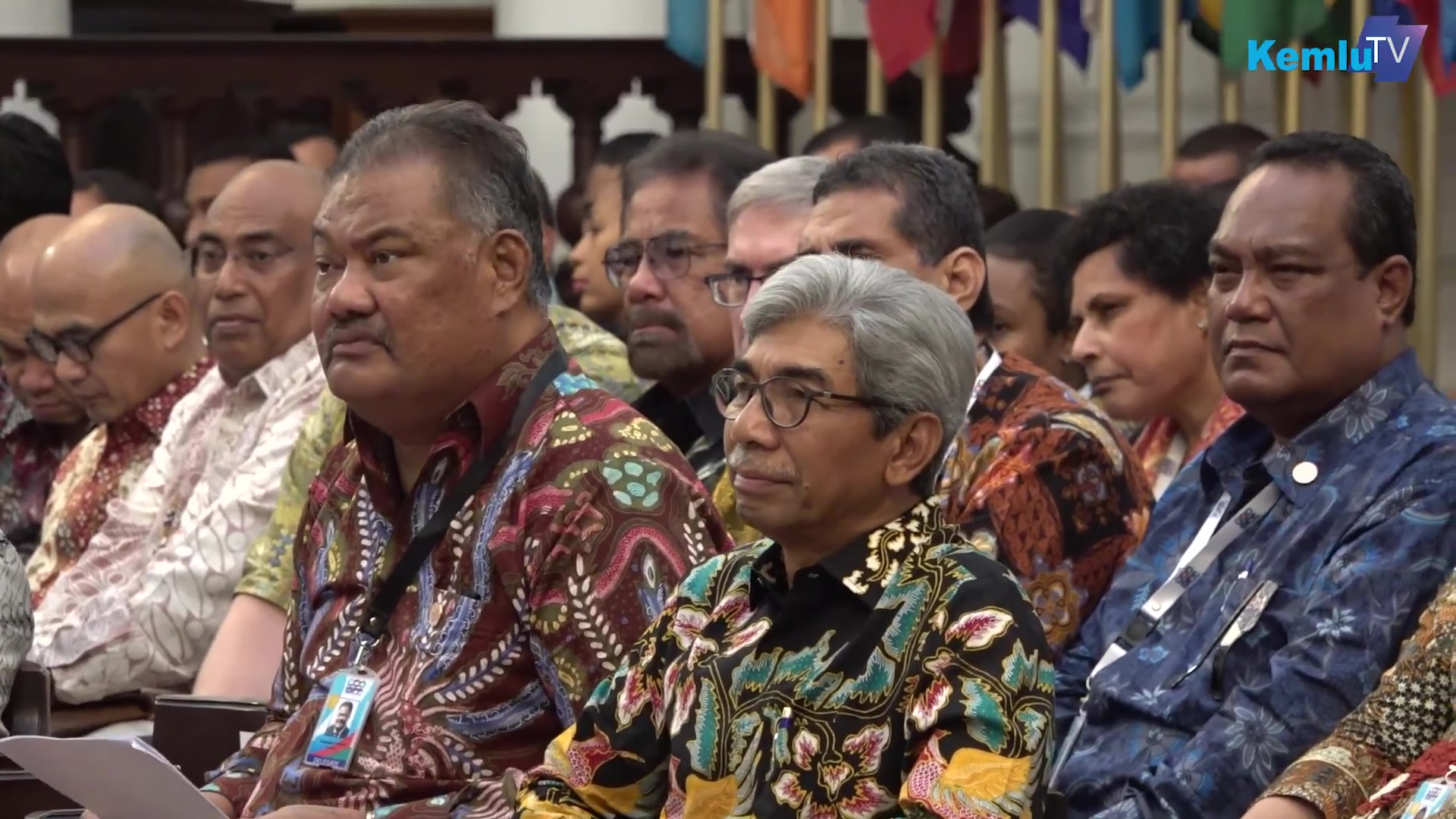
Abdurrahman with Tuvalu foreign minister, Taukelina Finikaso, on his left in 2019.

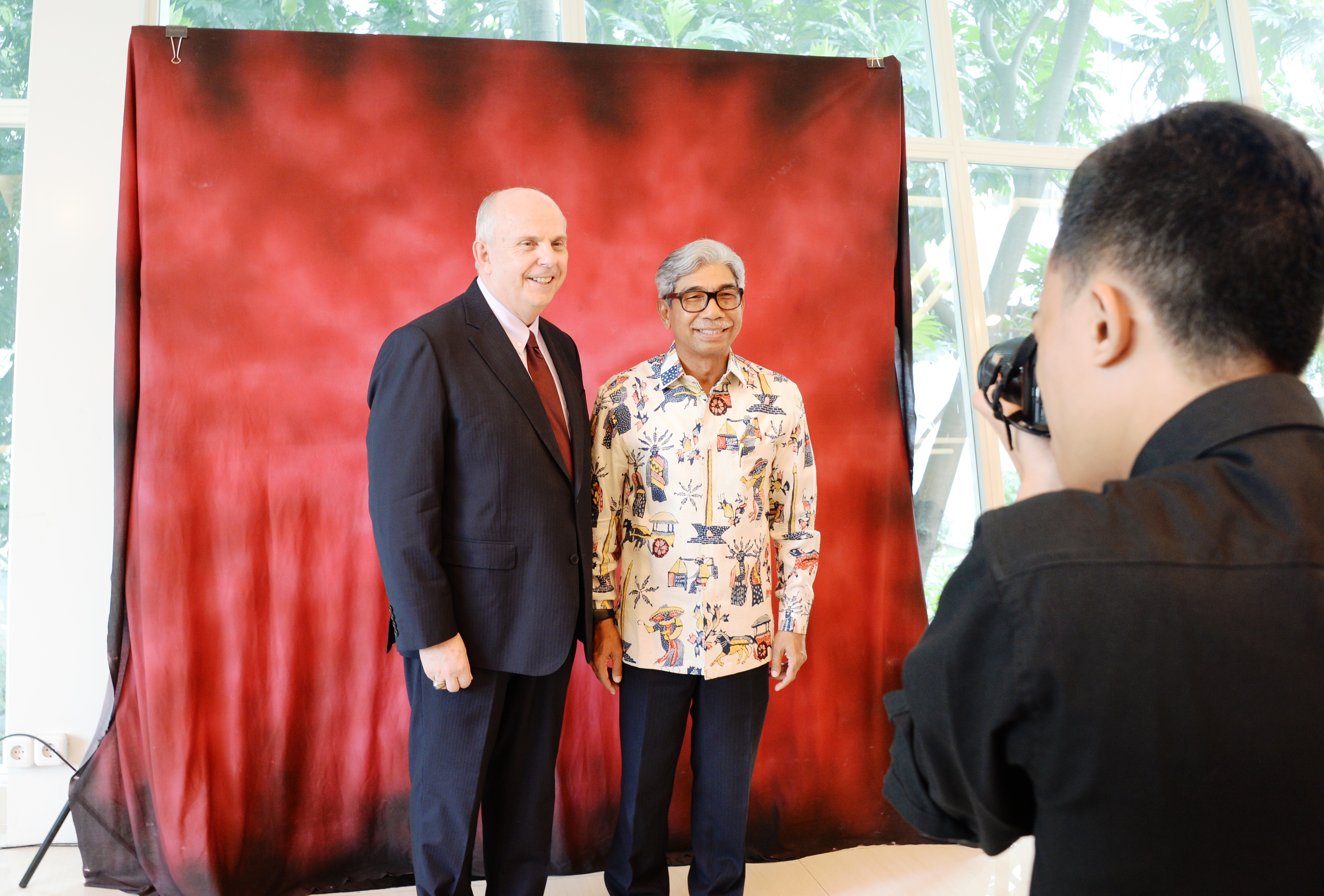
Abdurrahman with U.S. ambassador Joseph R. Donovan Jr.

Shortly before departing for Makkah to send off the second wave of hajj pilgrims, on 26 October 2014 Abdurrahman was suddenly summoned to the State Palace. Abdurrahman was later surprised to receive his appointment as deputy foreign minister on a short notice, as his name was rarely mentioned by the media for the position. Abdurrahman, who set aside several more prominent diplomats circulated for the position, was sworn in on 27 October. A year after the end of his term, on 13 October 2020 president Joko Widodo conferred him the Star of Service, 1st class as a recognition of his service.

== Personal life ==
Fachir was married to Yasmin Sukmawira, whom he met during the SSEAYP exchange program as his senior by two years. The couple, who was married on 7 January 1983, has a daughter and two sons. His eldest son, Ifa Fachir, is the pianist of the Maliq & D'Essentials jazz band.
