= Gatot Abdullah Mansyur =

Indonesian diplomat (born 1956)

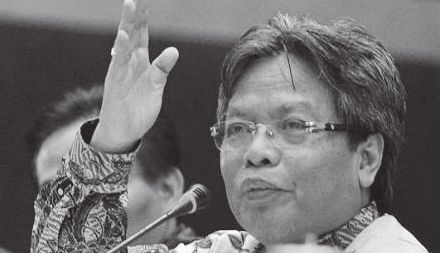

Chief of the National Agency for Placement and Protection of Indonesian Workers
- In office 19 March 2014 – 28 November 2014
- President: Susilo Bambang Yudhoyono; Joko Widodo
- Preceded by: Jumhur Hidayat
- Succeeded by: Nusron Wahid

Ambassador of Indonesia to Saudi Arabia
- In office 20 January 2010 – 31 December 2013
- President: Susilo Bambang Yudhoyono
- Preceded by: Salim Segaf Al-Jufri
- Succeeded by: Abdurrahman Mohammad Fachir

Personal details
- Born: July 2, 1956 (age 70) Tasikmalaya, West Java, Indonesia
- Party: Democratic Party
- Education: Syarif Hidayatullah State Islamic University Jakarta

Gatot Abdullah Mansyur (born 2 July 1956) is an Indonesian diplomat who was known for being the ambassador to Saudi Arabia from 2010 to 2013 and as the chief of the National Agency for Placement and Protection of Indonesian Workers for a few months in 2014.

== Early life and education ==
Born in Sirnagalih, a locality in Tasikmalaya, West Java, on 2 July 1956, Gatot completed his higher education at the Nahdlatul Ulama Teachers' School (PGANU, Pendidikan Guru Agama Nahdlatul Ulama) in 1975. Gatot received his bachelor's degree from the Jakarta Syarif Hidayatullah Islamic State Institute in 1981.

== Diplomatic career ==
Gatot joined the foreign department and rose through the ranks, and by 2000 became the second-in-command (de facto deputy chief of mission) at the embassy in Algiers under ambassador Dino Erwin. After Dino departed Algiers in February 2002, Gatot became the chargé d'affaires ad interim until the arrival of a new ambassador in 2003. During his provisional leadership, the embassy received a visit from president Megawati Sukarnoputri, who stated that the prolonged ambassadorial vacancy was due to a new screening system for ambassadorial candidates. He returned to Indonesia and subsequently become the deputy director of the second region in the directorate of the Middle East, before becoming the director of Middle East on 31 August 2004.

After two years serving in the position, in 2006 Gatot was sent to the embassy in Riyadh as the deputy chief of mission. He was reassigned as Indonesia's consul general in Jeddah a year later on 12 February 2007. As consul general, Gatot was responsible for ensuring the safety of Indonesian hajj pilgrims. On one occasion, an inspection team led by Gatot discovered congestions in almost all boarding points near the Masjid al-Haram, the central site of the hajj pilgrimage. Gatot attempted to resolve the problem by lobbying the muasasah (hajj service providers) to allocate more transport buses. Gatot remarked that the problem had arisen as pilgrim transport matters were handed over to the muasasah instead of being managed by the Indonesian government. Throughout 2009, Gatot oversaw trade agreement between the Jeddah and Jakarta chamber of commerce, as well as hosting Jeddah's 2nd Asian Film Festival within the consulate general's building.

== Ambassador to Saudi Arabia ==
Gatot was sworn in by president Susilo Bambang Yudhoyono as ambassador to Saudi Arabia, with concurrent accreditation to Oman, on 20 January 2010. Gatot presented his credentials to King Abdullah of Saudi Arabia on 23 October 2010. Gatot was the last non-resident ambassador to Oman, as in 2011 Indonesia opened its embassy in the country. Gatot's deputy was sent as the new ambassador to Oman. Early in his term, Gatot implemented several reforms to protect its migrant workers from abuse, such as establishing extension offices beyond the diplomatic missions and paying the salary of migrant workers through wire transfers.

Throughout his career, Gatot frequently handled cases of migrant workers being abused by their masters, with some cases involving rulings between life and death. In early November 2010, two separate cases of maid abuse sparked public outcry amongst the Indonesian public. Komalasari, an Indonesian maid, had her body found in a trash bin after allegedly being tortured and killed by her masters, while Sumiati binti Salan Mustapa, another maid, was reported to have suffered from severe injuries inflicted by the wife of her sponsor. The torture cases prompted the government to send a delegation to inspect the case, with calls for a moratorium of migrant workers to Saudi Arabia. After the incident, Gatot and manpower minister Muhaimin Iskandar struck an agreement with the Saudi government on repatriating thousands of migrant workers with criminal records. Gatot also announced changes to work contracts, which includes authentication of the contract in a diplomatic mission, and several new conditions. These new conditions, which increased recruitment charges dramatically, was protested by hiring agencies as "unwise and illogical".

In mid-2011, Gatot was called upon to resign after failing to prevent the execution of Ruyati, an Indonesian maid who was found guilty of killing the wife of her master, Khairiya bint Hamid Mijli. The court immediately declared Ruyati guilty on all counts after two trials, and she was executed on 18 June 2011. The government recalled Gatot for domestic consultations in protest two days later. During the parliamentary hearings on the issue, some parliament members called upon Gatot to resign from his position, to which he responded that "my fate lies upon the president". Gatot refused to be blamed, stating that he was "still new" and that it was the Saudi government's fault for not informing him of the execution. A post-mortem investigation conducted by a joint team revealed that the consulate general in Jeddah failed to relay the information of the execution, which should have been displayed on TV a week prior, and that the ambassador was only informed two hours after the execution had taken place. Although the embassy insisted on maintaining the secrecy of Ruyati's legal counsel, it was revealed that the embassy never provided a lawyer from the start.

Following Ruyati's death, the government intensified its effort in saving Indonesian maids on death row. The embassy allocated a considerable amount of funds to pay the diya of the convicted maids to free them from death row. Gatot described that the efforts in securing their release was easier said than done, as they have to secure clemency (tanazul) from the plaintiff's family. The government also escalated its prior soft moratorium, implemented since 1 January that year, into a full-blown moratorium on 1 August. During the 2013 Saudi-Indonesian economic forum in Jeddah, Gatot highlighted three points on migrant workers treatment as a condition to lift the moratorium: a general salary increase, defined working hours, and a one-day weekly rest. Gatot's ambassadorial term ended on 31 December 2013, and he was replaced by Abdurrahman Mohammad Fachir. The moratorium remained in place after his ambassadorial term ended.

== Migrant worker agency chief ==
On 19 March 2014, Gatot was appointed as the Chief of the National Agency for Placement and Protection of Indonesian Workers by president Susilo Bambang Yudhoyono, replacing Jumhur Hidayat who was dismissed eight days prior. At his inauguration, Gatot pledged to increase the quality of services for migrant workers. The following day, he visited the agency's crisis center and encouraged the employees to resolve Indonesian migrant worker issues. In September that year, Gatot launched an integrated public service unit aimed to increase the quality of its migrant workers' services. Aside from service-related issues, Gatot continued his prior works in rescuing migrant workers facing death sentence through the payment of diya. After President Joko Widodo took office in October, on 28 November that year Gatot was replaced by Golkar politician Nusron Wahid.

== Later career ==
In February 2015, foreign minister Retno Marsudi appointed the retired Gatot to coordinate efforts in evacuating Indonesians from Yemen amidst the raging civil war. In March 2025, Gatot was named as a member of the board of experts of the Democratic Party for international relations.
