= Nusron Wahid =

Indonesian politician (born 1973)

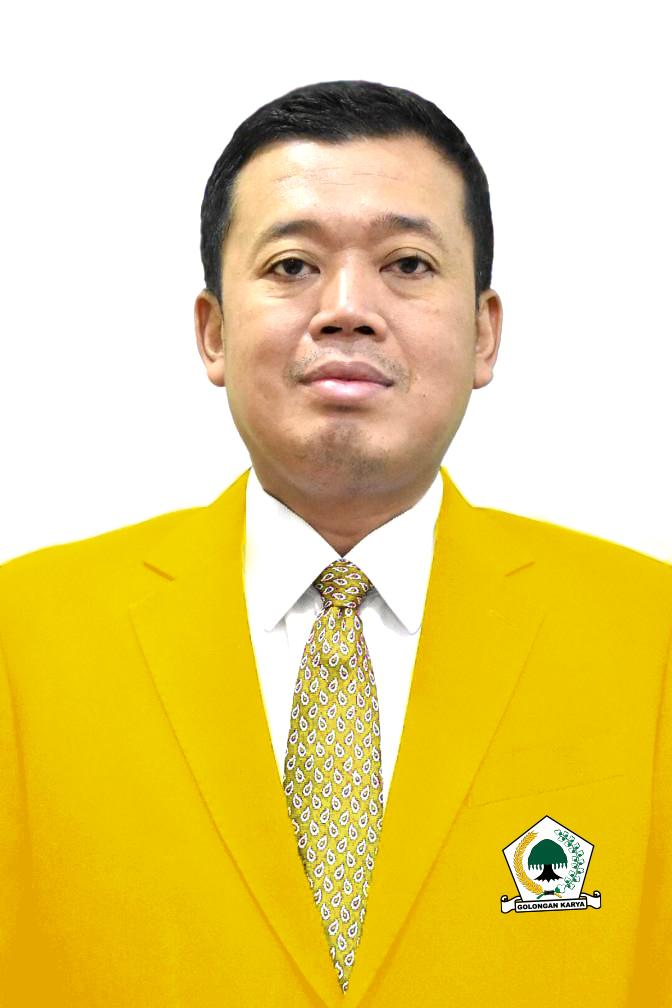

16th Minister of Agrarian Affairs and Spatial Planning
- Incumbent
- Assumed office 21 October 2024
- President: Prabowo Subianto
- Deputy: Ossy Dermawan
- Preceded by: Agus Harimurti Yudhoyono

Heads of the National Land Agency
- Incumbent
- Assumed office 21 October 2024
- President: Prabowo Subianto
- Deputy: Ossy Dermawan
- Preceded by: Agus Harimurti Yudhoyono

Member of House of Representatives
- In office 1 October 2019 – 21 October 2024
- Majorty: 122.571 (2019); 204.248 (2024)
- Parliamentary group: Golkar
- Constituency: Central Java II
- In office 1 Oktober 2004 – 5 Oktober 2015
- Perolehan suara: 13.157 (2004); 130.542(2009); 243.021 suara (2014)
- Succeeded by: Noor Achmad
- Parliamentary group: Golkar
- Constituency: Central Java II

Heads of the Indonesian Migrant Workers Protection Board
- In office 27 November 2014 – 20 Oktober 2019
- President: Joko Widodo
- Preceded by: Gatot Abdullah Mansyur
- Succeeded by: Benny Rhamdani

Personal details
- Born: 12 October 1973 (age 52) Kudus, Central Java, Indonesia
- Party: Golkar

Nusron Wahid (born 12 October 1973) is an Indonesian politician serving as Minister of Agrarian Affairs and Spatial Planning since 2024. He was a member of the House of Representatives from 2004 to 2015 and from 2019 to 2024.
