= Indonesia–Lebanon relations =

- Indonesia: Lebanon

Indonesia–Lebanon relations were officially established in 1950. Indonesia has an embassy in Beirut, while Lebanon has an embassy in Jakarta.

== History ==
The bilateral relations between Indonesia and Lebanon started with de jure acknowledgement of Indonesian Republic by Lebanese President Bechara El-Khoury on July 29, 1947. Lebanon was the third nation that recognized the sovereignty of Indonesia after Egypt and Syria. The diplomatic relations was officially established on 27 February 1950 when President Sukarno appointed Bagindo Dahlan Abdullah, a member of the Central Indonesia National Committee, to serve as the ambassador of the United States of Indonesia to Iraq, Syria, Lebanon, and Jordan with a permanent residence in Baghdad, through the Indonesian embassy in Cairo was also accredited to Lebanon. In the mid 1950s, Indonesia established their representative office in Beirut, however it was closed in 1976 because of the Lebanese Civil War. In 1995, Lebanon established their embassy in Jakarta, and reciprocated by Indonesia in the following year. Indonesia also established a consulate general in Tripoli in 1997, the second largest city in Lebanon.

In 2006, Indonesia sent a contingent of more than 1,000 soldiers as members of the United Nations peacekeeping force in southern Lebanon.
