= Embassy of Indonesia, Cairo =

Embassy of the Republic of Indonesia in Cairo Kedutaan Besar Republik Indonesia di Kairo سفارة جمهورية أندونيسيا، القاهرة

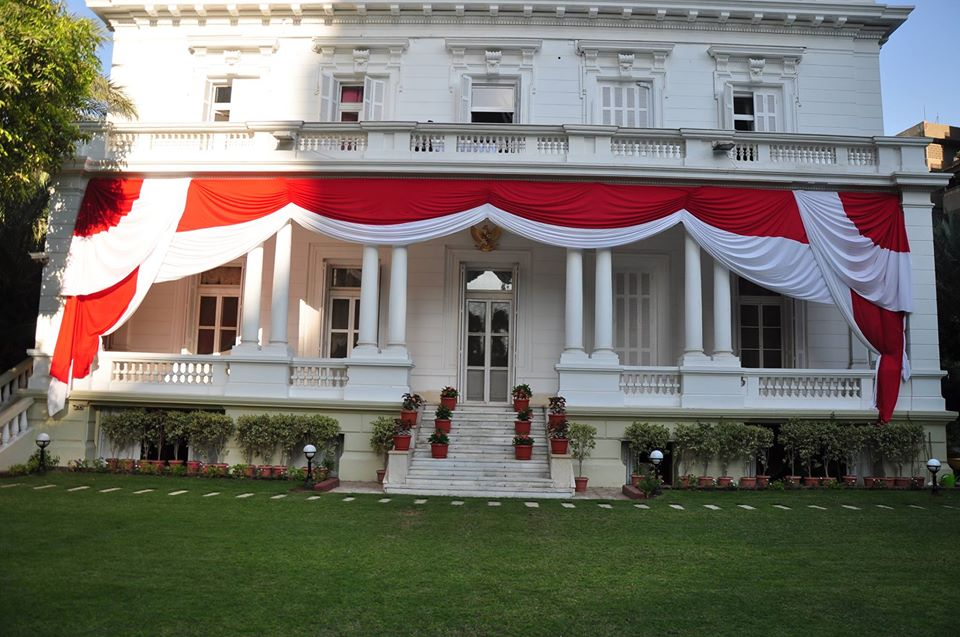
- Location: Cairo, Egypt
- Address: 13, Aisha Taymouria Street; Garden City, Cairo 1661; Egypt
- Coordinates: 30.034935°N 31.231067°E
- Ambassador: Helmy Fauzy
- Website: kemlu.go.id/cairo/en/

The Embassy of the Republic of Indonesia in Cairo (Indonesian: Kedutaan Besar Republik Indonesia di Kairo; Arabic: سفارة جمهورية أندونيسيا، القاهرة) is the diplomatic mission of the Republic of Indonesia to the Arab Republic of Egypt. The first Indonesian ambassador to Egypt was Haji Mohammad Rasyidi (1950–1952). The current ambassador, Helmy Fauzy, was appointed by President Joko Widodo on 25 February 2016.

== History ==
Diplomatic relations between Indonesia and Egypt were established on 10 June 1947 after the signing of the Treaty of Friendship and Cordiality between the two countries by Minister of Foreign Affairs Haji Agus Salim of Indonesia and Prime Minister Mahmoud El Nokrashy Pasha of Egypt. Two months later Indonesia opened a diplomatic mission in Cairo with H. M. Rasyidi as Chargé d'affaires. On 25 February 1950, the mission was elevated to embassy status and Rasyidi became the first Indonesian ambassador to Egypt. He was also appointed non-resident ambassador to Saudi Arabia.

Abdurrahman Wahid, the 4th president of Indonesia, was employed at the embassy around 1964, while he was a student at Al-Azhar University. His duties included translating reports into Arabic and English. After the failed 30 September Movement in 1965, he was ordered to prepare reports about his fellow students as he was active in the local Association of Indonesian Students organization. The Indonesian government at that time wanted to root out Indonesian students who could be communist sympathizers. Many of his reports cleared the students pointing out that the students' Marxist thoughts were more academic in nature rather than ideological.

== See also ==
- Egypt–Indonesia relations
- List of diplomatic missions of Indonesia
- List of diplomatic missions in Egypt
