= Helmy Fauzi =

Indonesian politician

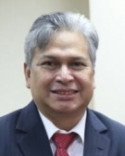

Ambassador of Indonesia to Egypt
- In office 25 February 2016 – 2020

Member of the People's Representative Council
- In office 2009–2014

Personal details
- Born: 27 February 1964 (age 62) Balikpapan, Indonesia
- Party: Indonesian Democratic Party of Struggle (PDI-P)

Helmy Fauzi (born 27 February 1964) is an Indonesian politician and diplomat. He was member of the People's Representative Council for the Indonesian Democratic Party of Struggle (PDI-P) between 2009 and 2014. He was Indonesia's ambassador to Egypt between 2016 and 2020.

== Life ==
Fauzi was born on 27 February 1964 in Balikpapan. He was member of the People's Representative Council for the Indonesian Democratic Party of Struggle (PDI-P) between 2009 and 2014. He also served as spokesperson for the party. In the People's Representative Council he served on Commission I overseeing defense, information and foreign affairs.

Fauzi favored the code of conduct signed between Australia and Indonesia, citing that the Indonesian government wants Australia to respect the Indonesian sovereignty.

Concerning the relationships between Indonesia and the Netherlands, the former colonial power over Indonesia, he said in 2013 that relationships were strained. Stating that what happened after the declaration of independence has been forgiven but not forgotten by Indonesia.

He served on the national secretariat for Joko Widodo when he was preparing for the Presidential elections of 2014. On 25 February 2016 President Widodo appointed him as ambassador to Egypt. He served until 2020.
