= Ship for Southeast Asian and Japanese Youth Program =

Annual youth exchange program

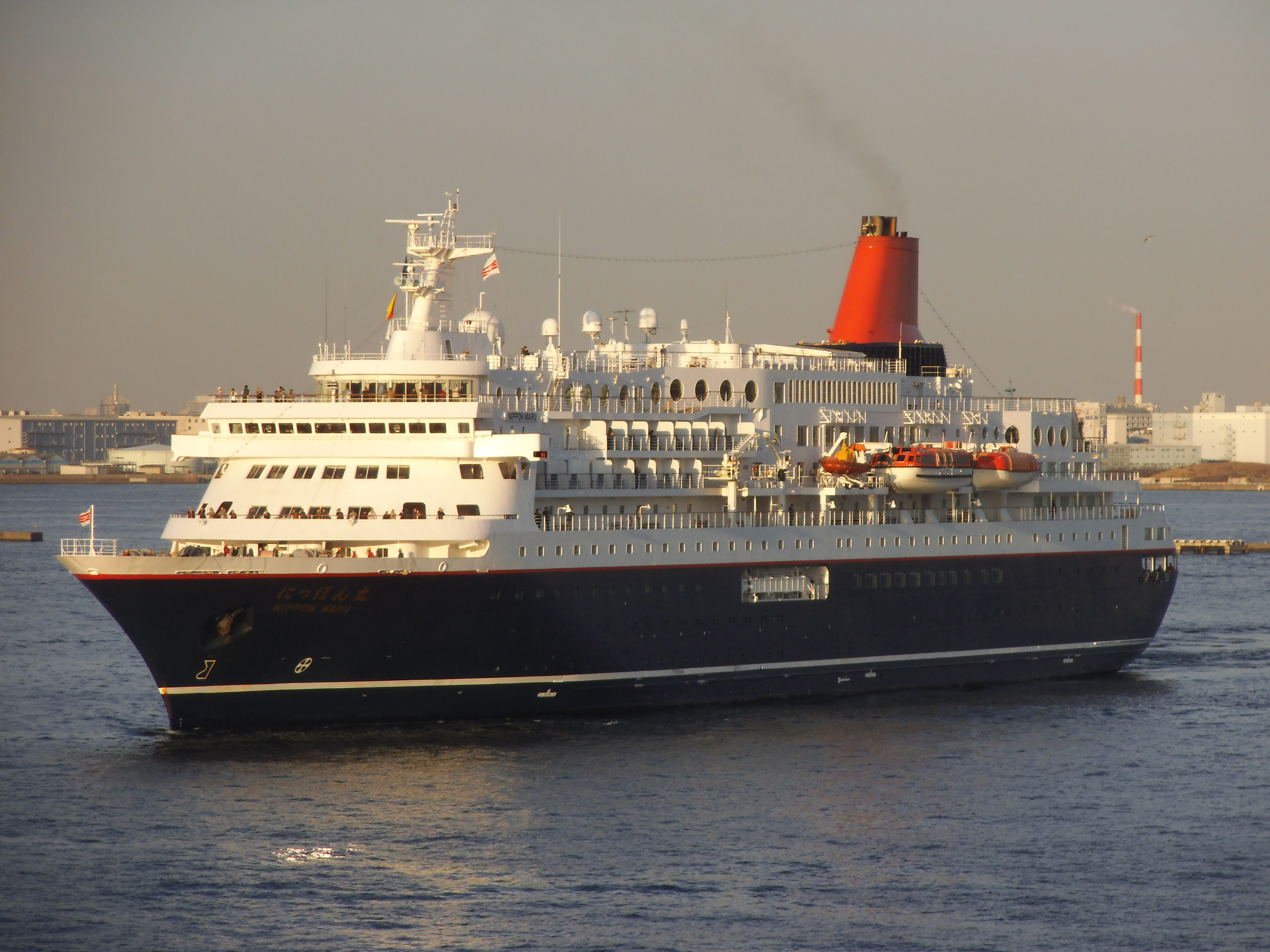
The passenger liner Nippon-maru after the great remodeling

The Ship for Southeast Asian and Japanese Youth Program (東南アジア青年の船 Tōnan-ajia-seinen-no-fune^{?}), commonly referred to as The Ship for Southeast Asian Youth Program and SSEAYP /sjɑːp/, /siːˈjɑːp/ see-YAHP, is an annual youth exchange program organised by the Cabinet Office of Japan and governments of Southeast Asian countries. Since its inception in 1974, the program has organised 46 international voyages attended by youth delegations sent by governments of respective members.

Four cruise ships have been deployed by the CaO for the journeys.

== History ==
SSEAYP is an annual programme sponsored by the Japanese Cabinet Office and supported by the member-countries of ASEAN. The programme brings together more than 300 youths from ASEAN countries and Japan, providing them with the unique opportunity to live together on board the ship Nippon Maru for over 40 days.

SSEAYP started in January 1974 based on Joint Statements issued between Japan and the five ASEAN countries, namely, Indonesia, Malaysia, Philippines, Singapore and Thailand. Brunei Darussalam joined in 1985. Viet Nam joined the programme in 1995 while the Lao People's Democratic Republic, Myanmar joined in 1998, Cambodia in 2000 and Timor Leste in 2024.

== Program Outline ==
=== On Board Activities ===
- Discussion Group (DG)
- Solidarity Group Activity (SG Activity)
- Participating Youth Seminar (PY Seminar)
- Voluntary Activity (VA)
- National Presentation (NP)
- Flag Hoisting

=== Port-of-Call Activities ===
- Courtesy Calls
- Institutional Visits
- Interaction with Local Youths
- Homestay Program

=== Working Language ===
The official working language for the program is English.

== Participating Countries ==
Country	Year of joining SSEAYP
Brunei Darussalam	1985
Cambodia	2000
Indonesia	1974
Japan	1974
Lao People's Democratic Republic	1998
Malaysia	1974
Myanmar	1998
Philippines	1974
Singapore	1974
Thailand	1974
Vietnam	1995

== Cruise Ships in Use ==
Period	Ship	Current status
1974–1976	Nippon Maru (A)	
1976–1989	Nippon Maru (B)	
1990–2008	Nippon Maru (C)	
2009–2012	Fuji Maru	
2013–Present	Nippon Maru (C)	

== SSEAYP International General Assembly (SIGA) ==
SSEAYP International General Assembly (SIGA) shall be organized annually by member Alumni Association (AA) for the following purposes: A To create opportunity for the reunion of former participants to promote lasting friendship, understanding and goodwill. B To exchange information on activities of AA & SI secretariat; C The agenda for SIGA shall include 3 parts as follows: C1 Council of Presidents Meeting C2 Open Forum C3 Organised tour / Home stay / Social Service Projects proposed by Host Country

The following SIGA were successfully hosted by AA since 1988:

1. 1988 Malaysia (Kuala Lumpur)

2. 1989 Philippines (Quezon City)

3. 1990 Brunei Darussalam (Bandar Seri Begawan)

4. 1991 Indonesia (Jakarta)

5. 1992 Singapore

6. 1993 Thailand (Bangkok)

7. 1994 Japan (Tokyo)

8. 1995 Malaysia (Kuala Lumpur, Genting Highlands)

9. 1996 Philippines (Pasay)

10. 1997 Brunei Darussalam (Bandar Seri Begawan)

11. 1998 Philippines (Clark)

12. 1999 Singapore

13. 2000 Indonesia (Bali)

14. 2001 Thailand (Bangkok, Ko Samet)

15. 2002 Japan (Tokyo)

16. 2004 Malaysia (Kuala Lumpur, Malacca)

17. 2005 Viet Nam (Hanoi, Halong Bay)

18. 2006 Brunei Darussalam (Bandar Seri Begawan)

19. 2007 Cambodia (Siem Reap)

20. 2008 Philippines (Cebu)

21. 2009 Indonesia (Yogyakarta)

22. 2010 Thailand (Ayutthaya)

23. 2011 Singapore

24. 2012 Japan (Tokyo)

25. 2013 Lao P.D.R. (Vientiane)

26. 2014 Malaysia (Langkawi)

27. 2015 Viet Nam (Hanoi, Halong Bay)

28. 2016 Cambodia (Siem Reap)

29. 2017 Philippines (Iloilo, Boracay)

30. 2018 Indonesia (Bandung)

31. 2019 Brunei Darussalam (Bandar Seri Begawan)

32. 2022 Japan (Online)

33. 2024 Thailand (Pattaya)

34. 2026 Lao P.D.R. (Vientiane) - 5–6 May 2026 Social Contribution Activities; 7–11 May SIGA

35. 2027 Cambodia (Siem Reap) 30 April 2027 to 4 May 2027

== Alumni Organisations ==
Secretariat

SSEAYP International (coordinated with IYEO)

Full Member

Brunei Darussalam : Persatuan BERSATU (SSEAYP International Brunei Darussalam/SI Brunei Darussalam)

Cambodia : SSEAYP International Cambodia (SI Cambodia)

Indonesia : SSEAYP International Indonesia, Inc. (SI Indonesia/SII)

Japan : IYEO (International Youth Exchange Organization of Japan)

Malaysia : KABESA (SSEAYP International Malaysia/SI Malaysia)

Myanmar : Association for Youth Development Myanmar (SSEAYP International Myanmar/SI Myanmar)

Philippines : SSEAYP International Philipplines, Inc. (SI Philippines/SIP)

Singapore : SSEAYP International Singapore (SI Singapore/SIS)

Milestones of SSEAYP International Singapore (SIS)

1974 First Ship for South East Asian and Japanese Youth Program (SSEAYP) was launched on 10 October 1974. 1979 The Singapore alumni association was established as SSEAYP Alumni Singapore (SAS) on 12 July 1979. A biennial Executive Committee election system was adopted, and The Wavelength quarterly newsletter was launched as the official communication platform. 1987 Singapore became a founding signatory to the SSEAYP International (SI) Charter, leading to the establishment of the annual SSEAYP International General Assembly (SIGA) hosted on a rotational basis among member countries.

1992 SIS hosted the 5th SIGA in Singapore and published the LINK-8 Membership Directory, strengthening regional alumni networking.

1995 SIS was given as a nomination agency for the Pan-Pacific Youth Exchange Programme (PPYEP), facilitated the appointment of former participants as Singapore National Leaders, and contributed to the publication of the 20th Anniversary ASEAN-Japan Alumni Directory.

1997 The first SSEAYP International booklet was published by SIS, the SIS Homestay Committee was established.

1999 SIS hosted the 12th SIGA, expanded its role in Singapore's local reception programme, Participant selection, SWY activities, and international youth exchange partnerships, and organised the SI Millennium Chat-cum-Dinner.

2010 SIS achieved recognition in the Singapore Book of Records through an SSEAYP environmental upcycling project, hosted the 23rd SIGA with an environmental theme, and commemorated the 30th Anniversary of Singapore's participation in SSEAYP.

2013 SIS received SI Award Group for inclusion of Social Contribution Activities into SIGA . On 28 Nov 2013, SIS was registered as an independent society with the Registry of Societies Singapore, strengthening its governance and organisational structure. Standard operating procedures for the Biennial General Meeting were also formalised.

2016 SIS was awarded the Japanese Foreign Minister's Commendation for promoting friendship between Singapore and Japan through SSEAYP and post-programme activities. Members of Ex-Co received Certificates of Honour from the Government of Japan.

2019 SIS celebrated the 40th Anniversary of the association with a Gala Dinner and established the SIS Student Care Assistance (SCA) Fund to support children of needy members.

2020 During the COVID-19 pandemic, SIS introduced online alumni programmes, revamped its website with online registration and e-payment capabilities, and launched Sharing Inspirational Stories (SIS) to strengthen member engagement.

2022 SIS organised regular heritage walks, commemorated SSEAYP Day and the 50th Anniversary of ASEAN-Japan Friendship and Cooperation with a tree-planting event, and strengthened engagement with Year Representatives.

2024 Members elected the 6th Executive Board, continuing SIS's mission of promoting lifelong friendship, leadership development, and regional cooperation among SSEAYP alumni. AYLEP was implemented as a joint project benefitted 65 youth leaders from Thailand, Malaysia and Singapore.

2026 The 7th Executive Board revisited the VMV of SIS with a strategic planning session held on 12 July 2026

Thailand : Association of the Ship for Southeast Asian Youth of Thailand (SSEAYP International Thailand/SI Thailand)

Associate Member

Lao P.D.R. : Lao SSEAYP Alumni Association (LSAA)

Viet Nam : Vietnam Alumni Club of Youth Friendship Exchange Programs (VACYF)

Data is per 24 March 2022
