= Bali Democracy Forum =

The Bali Democracy Forum (BDF) is a meeting held in Bali, and attended by representatives from nations in the Asia Pacific region. The forum was initiated by Indonesia in 2008 with the stated aim of fostering democracy, human rights, equality, and mutual respect.

As of 2018, there have been 11 forums, held each year since 2008. 58 nations have attended the forums, with some from outside the Pacific region, such as Yemen and Afghanistan. The forum has been the subject of controversy and has been boycotted by several groups because of the perceived lack of democratic ideals in Bali, the removal of direct elections for local bodies, and the banning of protests during the forum itself.

BDF participants are encouraged to discuss democracy constructively, regardless of their own political taboos or restrictive standardization. The BDF encourages participants to share their experiences in accordance with the conditions of each country.

== History ==
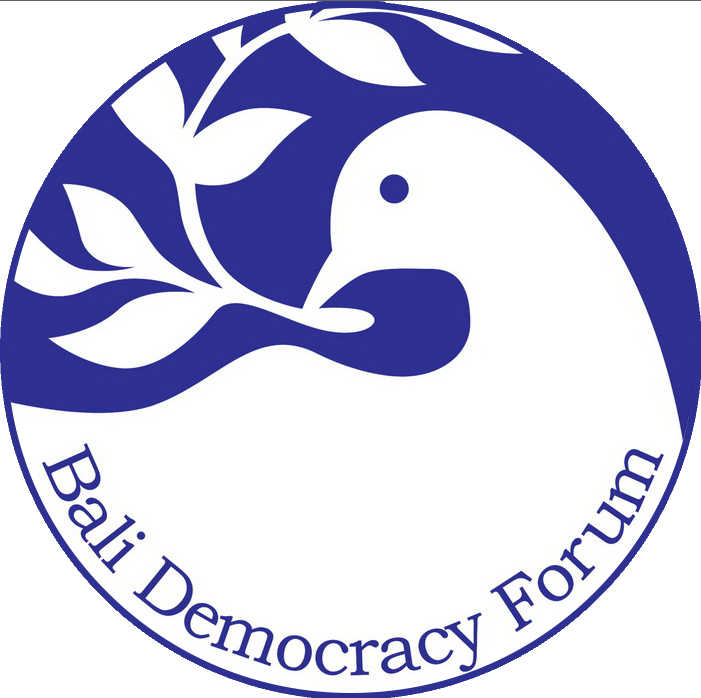
Logo of the Bali Democracy Forum (BDF)

Ten years after Indonesia began to reform its government, the BDF was founded. The BDF is an annual intergovernmental forum in which democratic development, particularly in the Asia-Pacific region, is discussed.

The BDF was created out of a stated belief that the promotion of democracy is an integral part of Indonesia's foreign policy. The forum was initiated to help create a strong democratic architecture in the region by sharing experiences, best practices, and adhering to the principles of equality, mutual understanding, and respect.

To date, the BDF has sought to advance democracy throughout the Asia Pacific region by promoting economic and political development, peace and security, and human rights, which are the three pillars of the United Nations.

== Development ==
=== BDF I ===
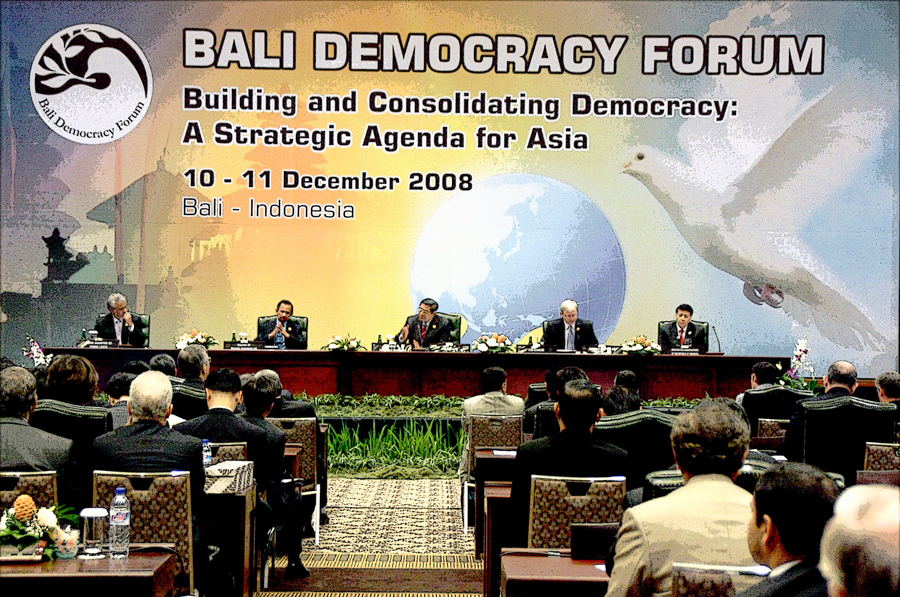
The first meeting of the Bali Democracy Forum

BDF I was held on December 10–11, 2008. This forum was chaired by the President of the Republic of Indonesia, Susilo Bambang Yudhoyono and the Prime Minister of Australia at the time, Kevin Rudd. The theme of the BDF I was “Building and Consolidating Democracy as Agenda for Asia” and was attended by 4 Heads of State/Government, with participation from 32 participants and 8 observers.

The goal of the first forum was to create solidarity among participating nations as they put forward a sustainable regional strategic agenda to strengthen democratic values and institutions.

=== BDF II ===
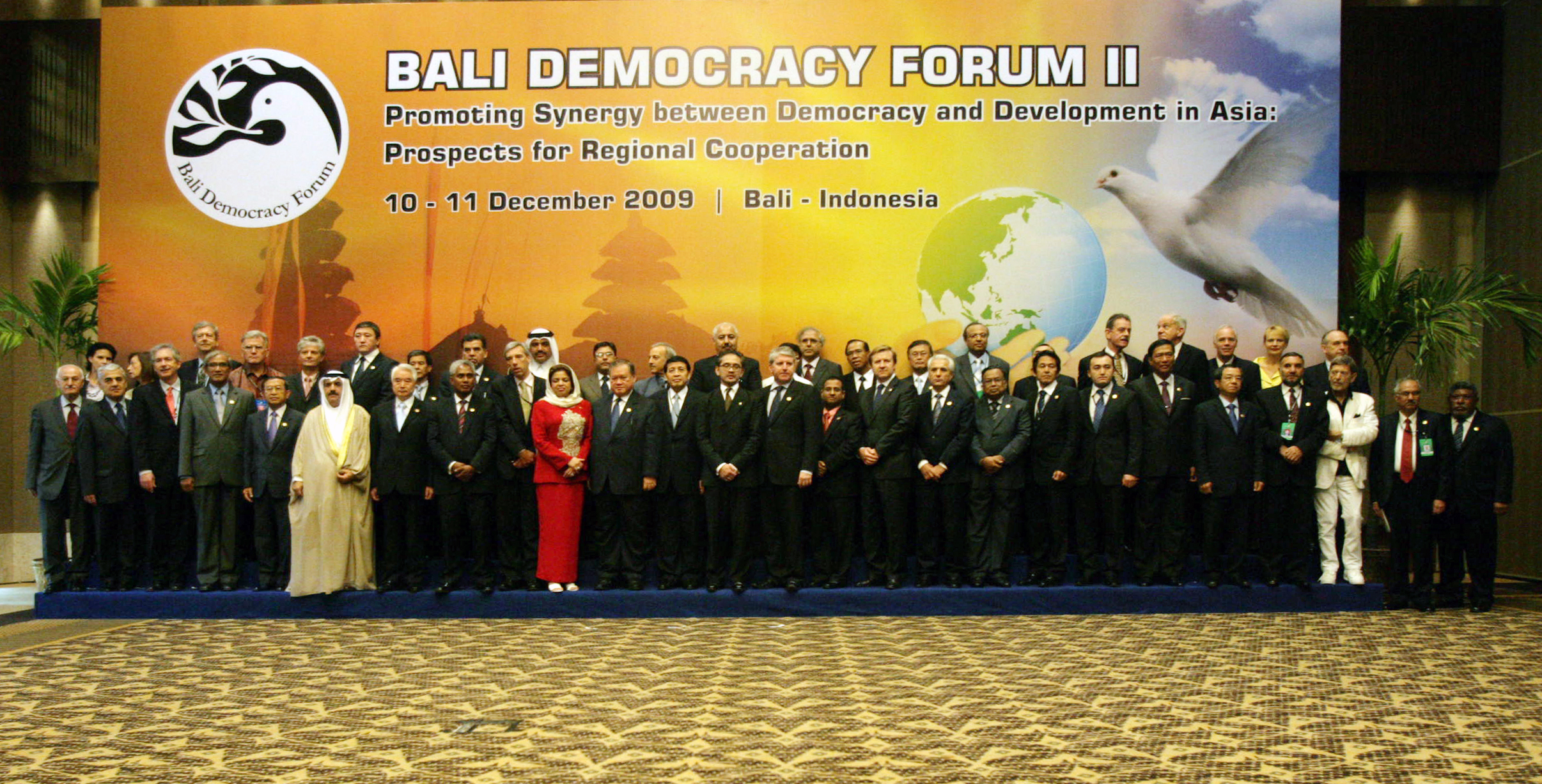
The second meeting of the Bali Democracy Forum

BDF II was held on December 10–11, 2009. This forum was chaired by the President of the Republic of Indonesia, Susilo Bambang Yudhoyono, and the Prime Minister of Japan at that time, Yukio Hatoyama. It was attended by four Heads of State/Government, with the participation from thirty-two participants and eight observers. The theme of the BDF II was “In Search of Synergy: Democracy, Rule of Law, and Development.”

The theme raised in BDF II was deemed relevant to the condition of the global community, which was in the midst of debt and financial crisis. With relatively stable growth, Asia was expected to be the engine of the global economic recovery. Political progress was considered important to create a balanced and conducive condition in Asia, as economic growth ultimately demands the enforcement of the rule of law and transparency.

=== BDF III ===
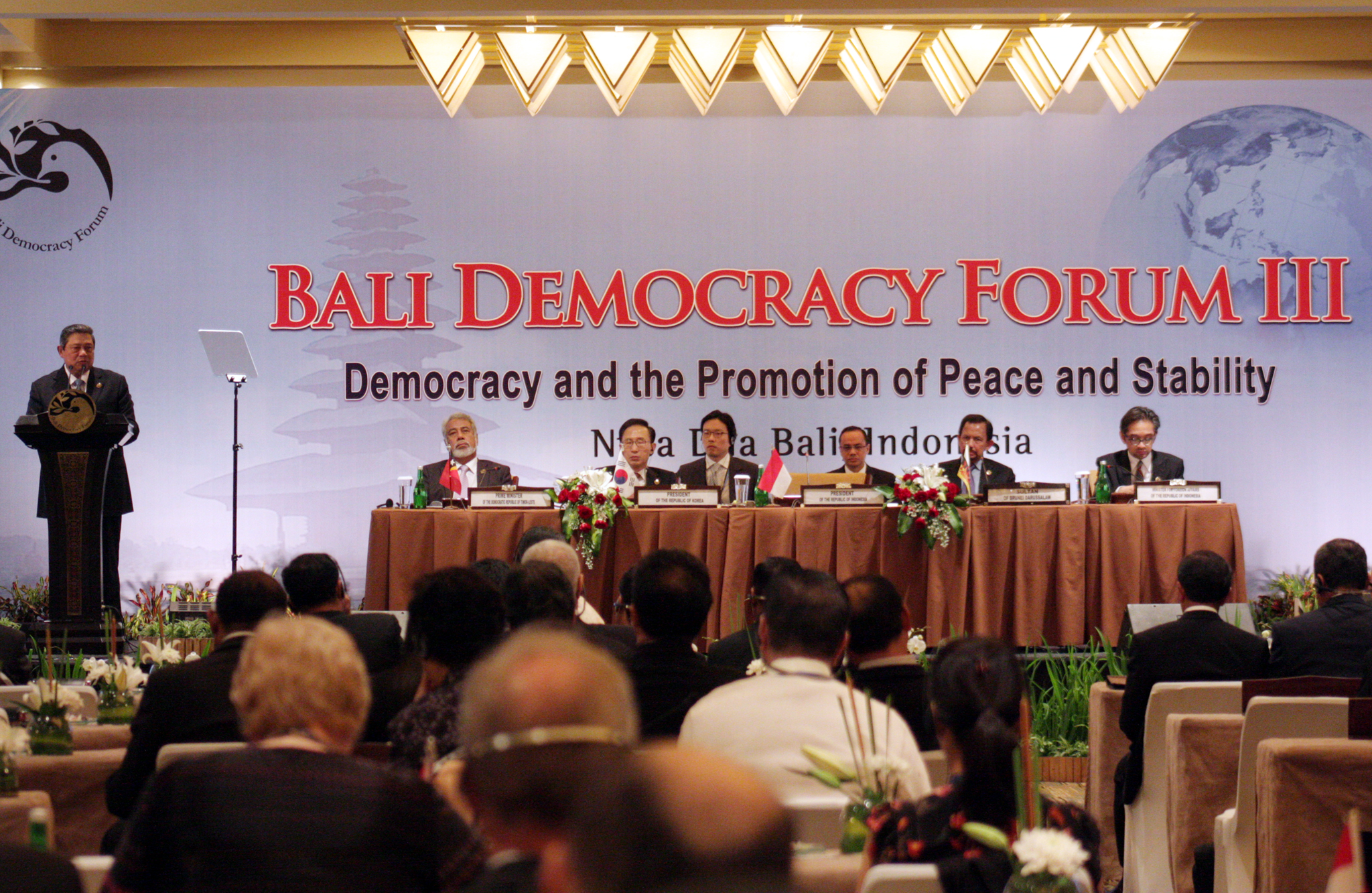
The third meeting of the Bali Democracy Forum

BDF III was held on 8–9 December 2010. This forum was chaired by the President of the Republic of Indonesia, Susilo Bambang Yudhoyono and the President of South Korea at the time, Lee Myung-bak. It was attended by four Heads of State/Government, with the participation from forty-four participants and twenty-seven observers. The theme of the BDF III was “Democracy and the Promotion of Peace and Stability”.

The third forum was held in the midst of a regional and political crisis on the Korean Peninsula. The forum agreed that democracy should be able to generate democratic dividends that can be felt directly by the community, including the creation of peace and stability. In the context of resolving a country's internal conflict, the importance of a dialogue mechanism that can ensure a peaceful transition of democracy was emphasized.

=== BDF IV ===
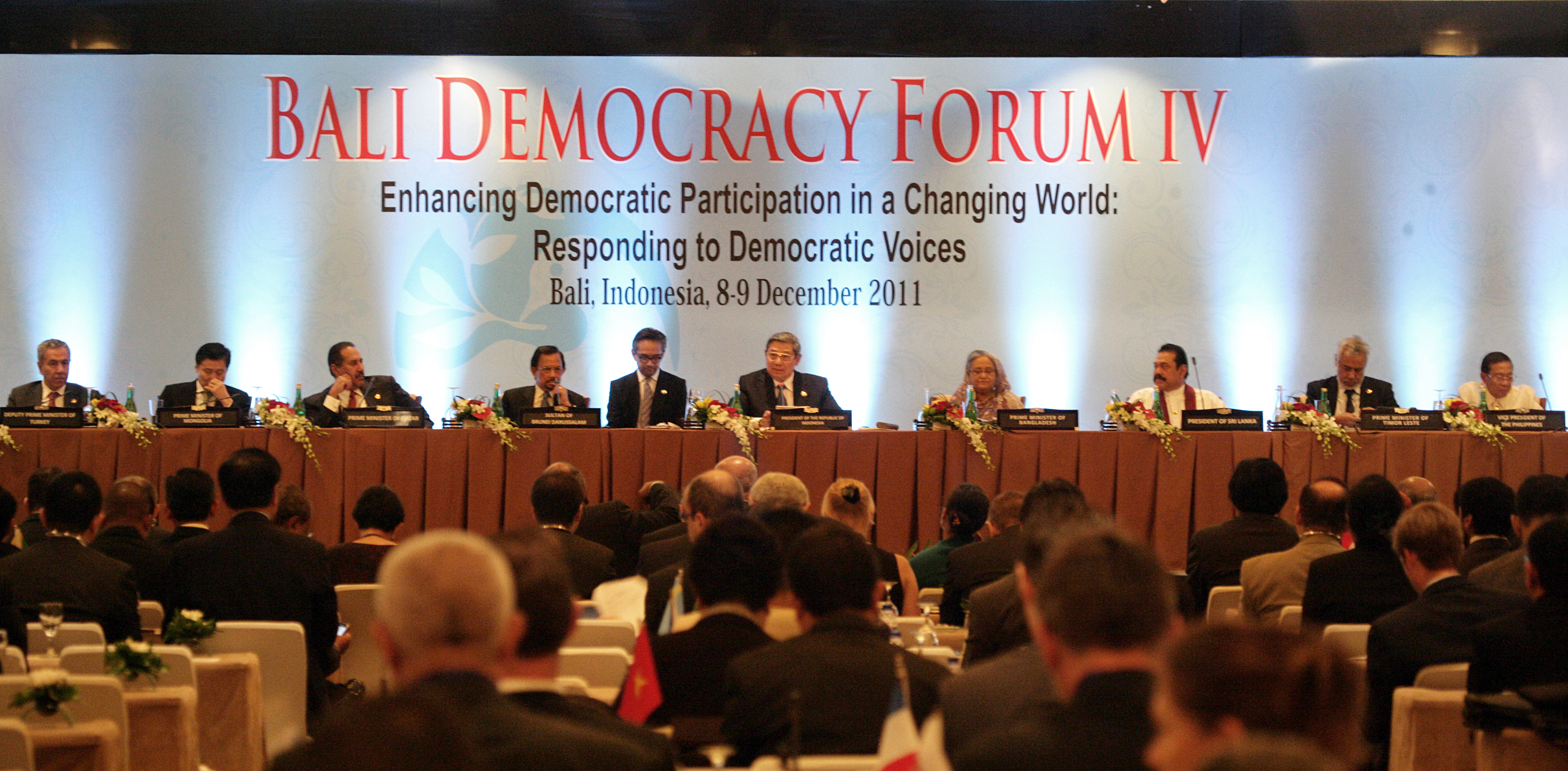
The fourth meeting of the Bali Democracy Forum

BDF IV was held on 8–9 December 2011. This forum was chaired by the President of the Republic of Indonesia, Susilo Bambang Yudhoyono and the Prime Minister of Bangladesh (Sheikh Hasina), attended by nine Heads of State/Government, with the participation from forty participants and forty-five observers. The theme of the BDF IV was “Enhancing Democratic Participation in a Changing World: Responding to Democratic Voices”.

The fourth forum was held amid the wave of democratization and political change in the Middle East, commonly known as the Arab Spring. The forum agreed to broad public participation in the formulation of public policies supported by information disclosure and transparency would foster deep-rooted democracy and maintain the sustainability of the democratic process.

=== BDF V ===
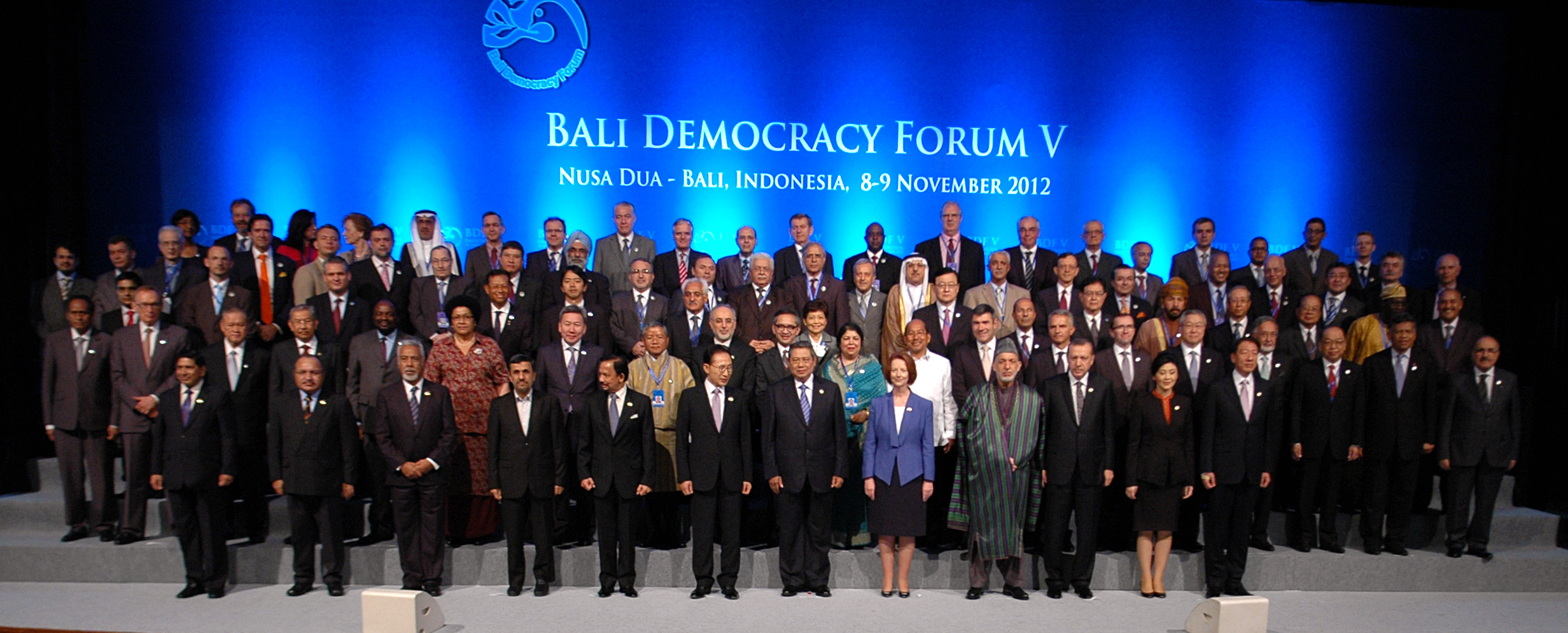
The fifth meeting of the Bali Democracy Forum

BDF V was held on 8–9 November 2012. This forum was chaired by the President of the Republic of Indonesia, Susilo Bambang Yudhoyono, the President of South Korea, the Prime Minister of Australia, and attended by the Sultan of Brunei Darussalam, the President of Afghanistan, the President of Iran, the Prime Minister of Timor Leste, the Prime Minister of Turkey, the Prime Minister of Thailand, the Prime Minister of Papua New Guinea, the Deputy Prime Minister of Singapore and the Deputy Vice Minister of Nepal. BDF V was attended by 37 participants and 48 observers.

The theme of the BDF V was “Advancing Democratic Principles at the Global Setting: How Democratic Global Governance Contributes to International Peace and Security, Economic Development, and Effective Enjoyment of Human Rights”. BDF V raised the theme of promoting democratic principles in global governance. The widespread demands of democracy in various parts of the world have not been followed by significant progress in promoting democratic attitudes among the international community.

=== BDF VI ===
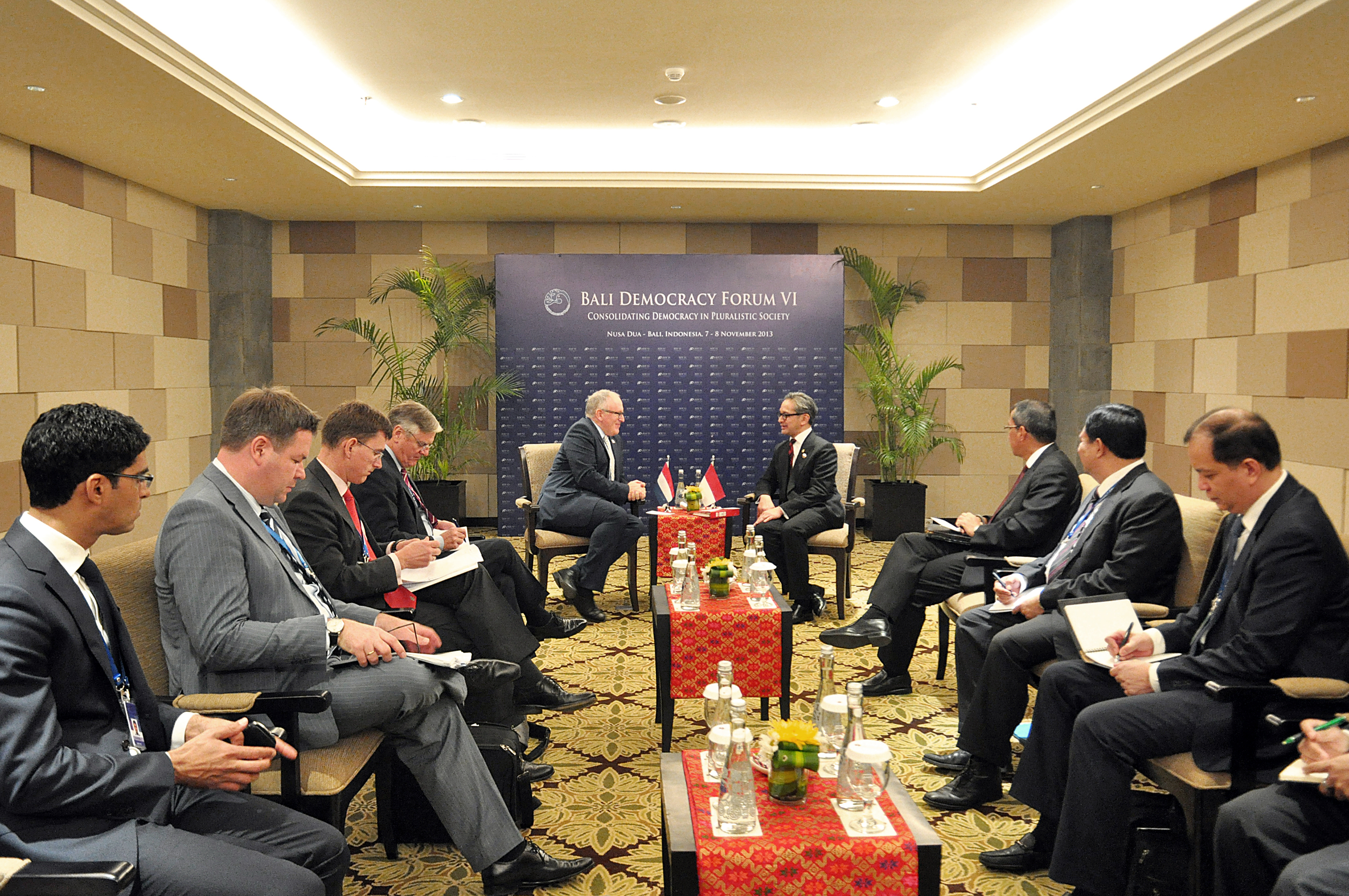
The sixth meeting of the Bali Democracy Forum

BDF VI was held on 7–8 November 2013. This forum was chaired by the President of the Republic of Indonesia, Susilo Bambang Yudhoyono, attended by three Heads of State/Government, with the participation from forty-three participants and fifty-two observers. The theme of the BDF VI was “Consolidating Democracy in Pluralistic Society”.

The theme of BDF VI is a reflection of Indonesia's experience and its projection of the problems faced by countries in the region. Pluralistic society is an asset worthy of consideration in democratic dividends, including in supporting the economic development of a country. The sixth forum also discussed the implementation of free and fair elections and strengthening democratic institutions.

=== BDF VII ===
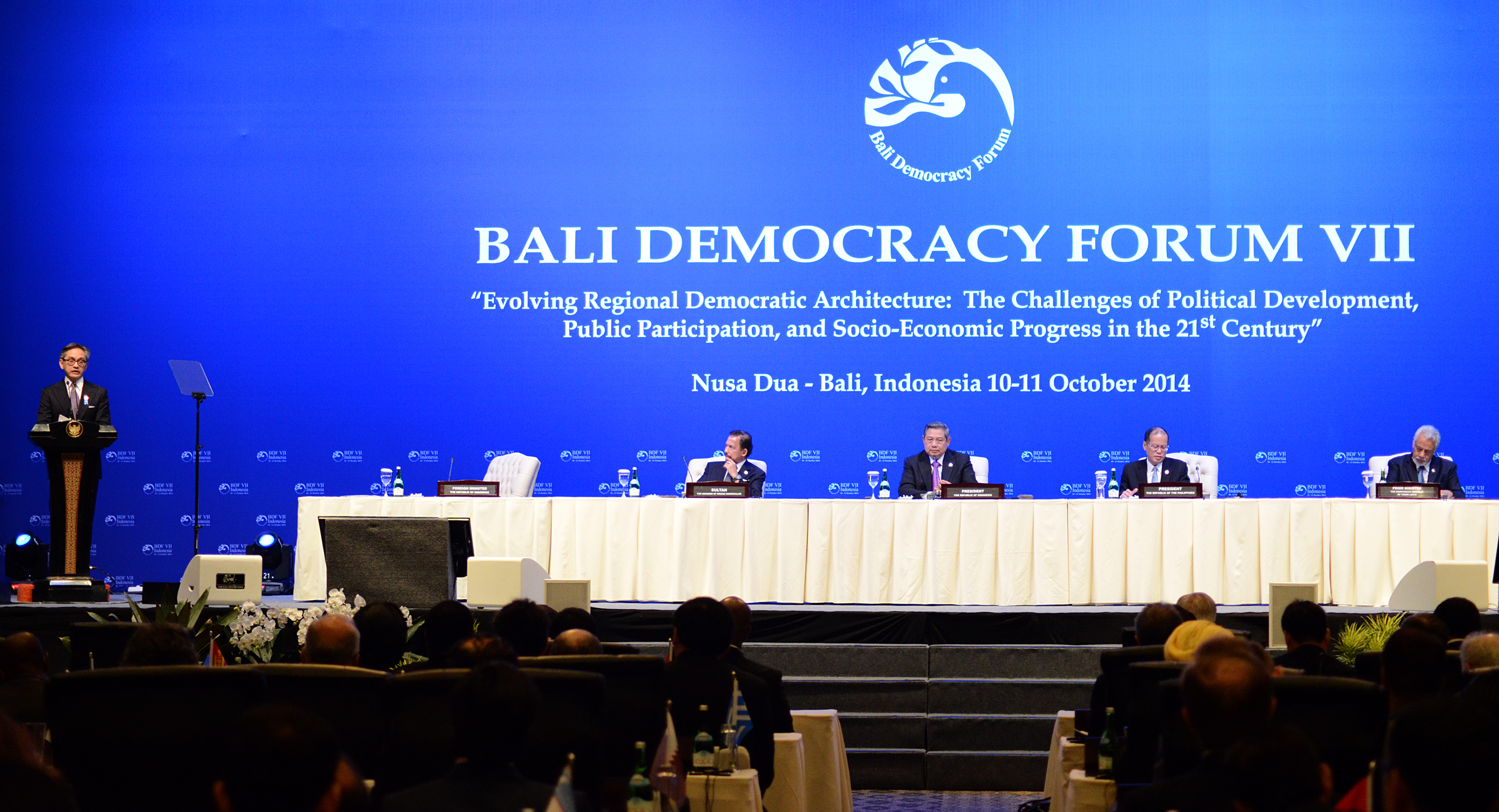
The seventh meeting of the Bali Democracy Forum

BDF VII was held in the Bali International Convention Center (BICC), Nusa Dua, Bali on 10 – 11 October 2014. This forum was chaired by the President of the Republic of Indonesia and the President of the Philippines. The forum was attended by the Sultan of Brunei, the Prime Minister of Timor Leste, forty-two participating countries, forty-five observing countries, and four observing international organizations.

The theme of the BDF VII was Evolving Regional Democratic Architecture: The Challenges of Political Development, Public Participation, and Socio-Economic Progress in the 21st Century. The theme was expected to give an opportunity to the participants to explore various effective and appropriate ways to form the structure of democracy in the region. The interactive discussion sessions had two sub-themes, “The Dynamics of Political Development and Socio-Economic Progress,” and “Promoting Active, Effective, and Meaningful Public Participation in the Democratic Process."

=== BDF VIII ===
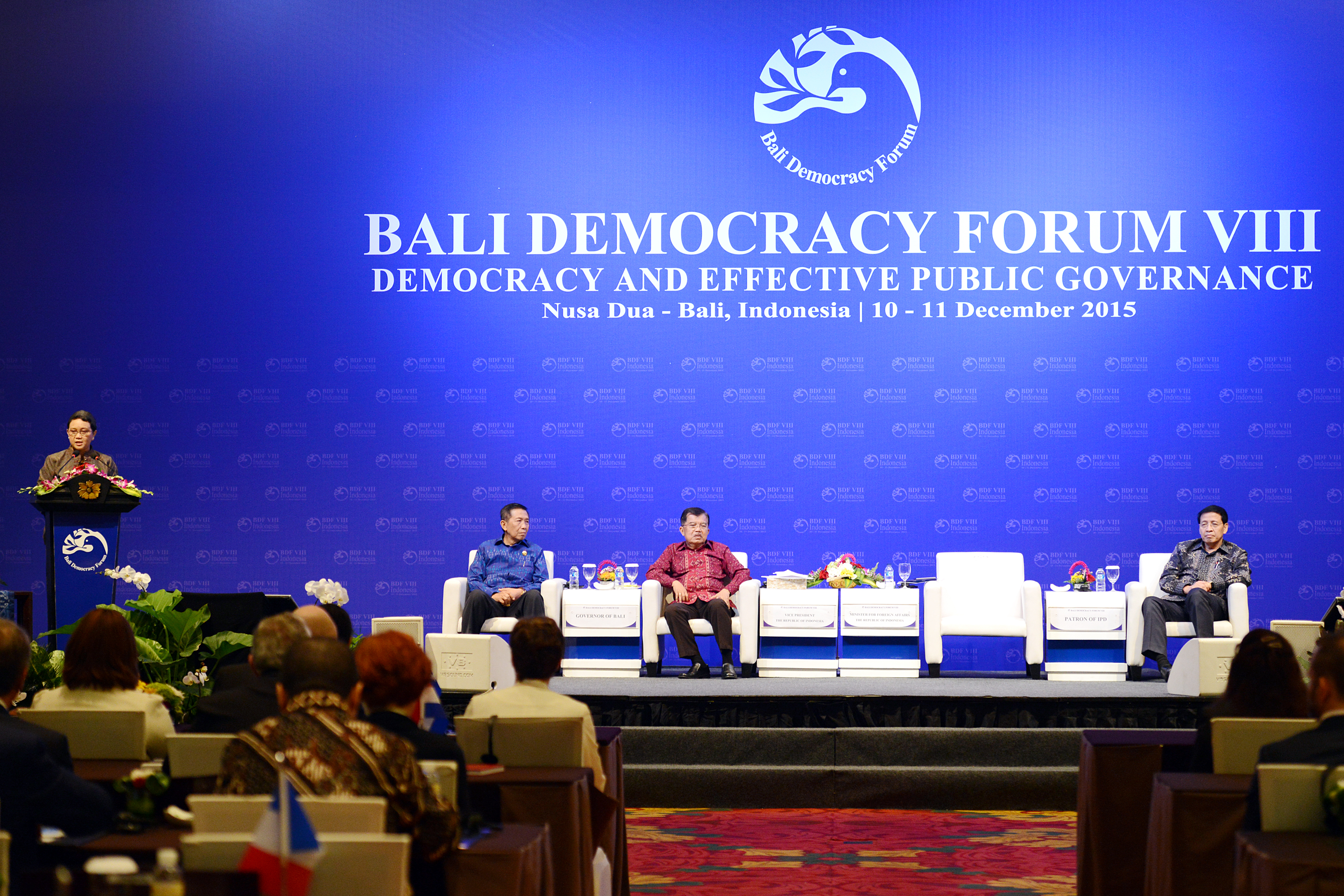
The eight meeting of the Bali Democracy Forum

BDF VIII was held on 10–11 December 2015 in the Bali Nusa Dua Convention Center (BNDCC), Nusa Dua, Bali, bearing the theme "Democracy and Effective Public Governance" in the format of a General Debate and 2 Panel Discussions.

The Forum was officially opened by the Vice President of the Republic of Indonesia and was attended by nineteen officials at the ministerial / vice-ministerial level. Overall, the BDF VIII was attended by approximately two-hundred and fifty delegates from eighty-nine countries and three international organizations.

=== BDF IX ===
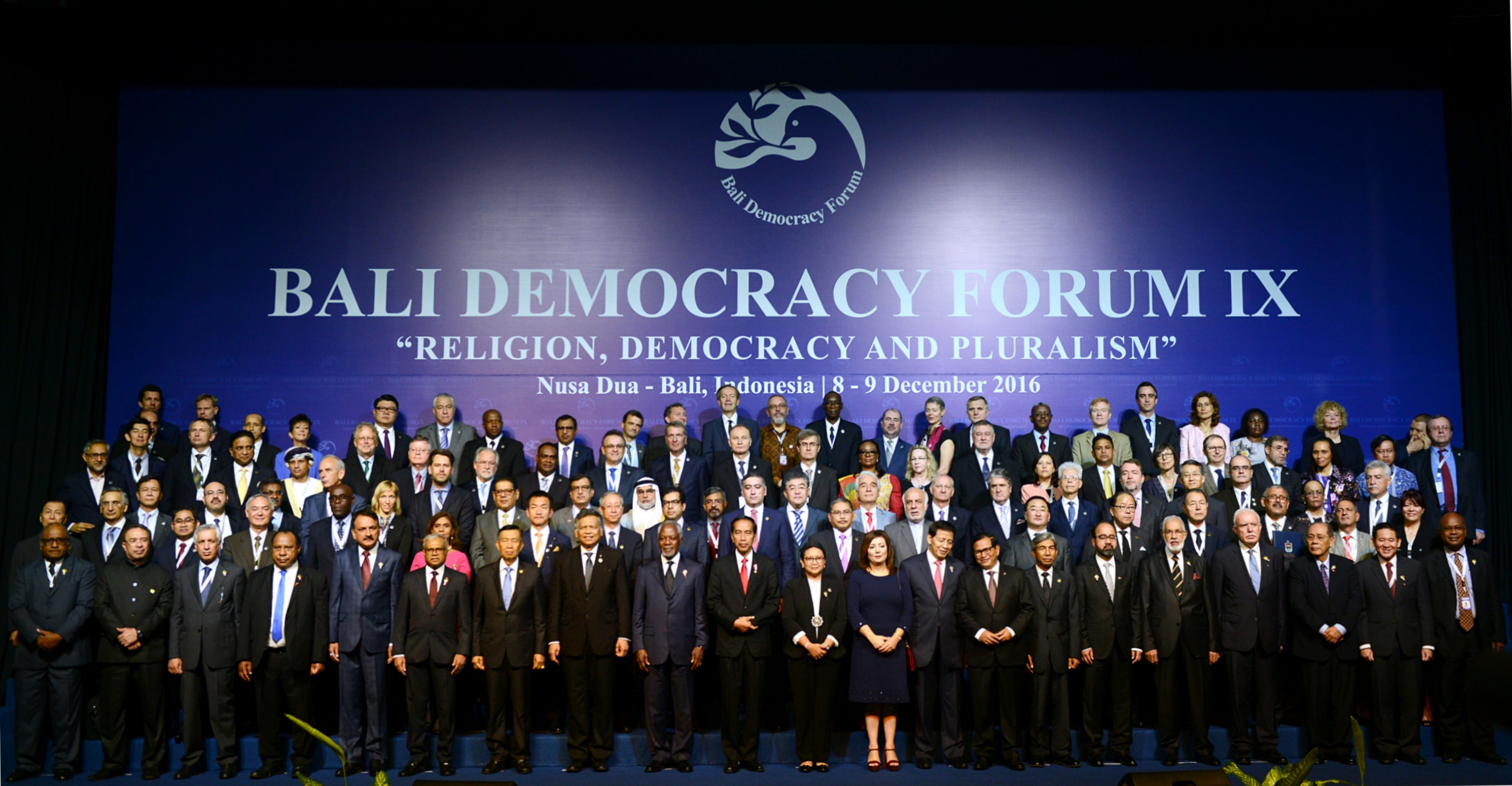
The ninth meeting of Bali Democracy Forum

BDF IX was held on 8–9 December 2016 in the Bali International Convention Center (BICC), Nusa Dua, Bali, bearing the theme “Religion, Democracy, and Pluralism” in the format of a General Debate and two Panel Discussions.

The Forum was officially opened by the President of the Republic of Indonesia and was attended by 26 officials at the ministerial / vice-ministerial level. Overall, the BDF IX was attended by approximately two hundred and thirty-seven delegates from ninety-five countries and six international organizations.

In order to show the practice of pluralism and tolerance in Indonesia, especially in Bali, in the program of the BDF IX, a field visit was conducted to Pondok Pesantren (Ponpes) of Bali Bina Insani (BBI) in Tabanan, Bali.

=== BDF X ===
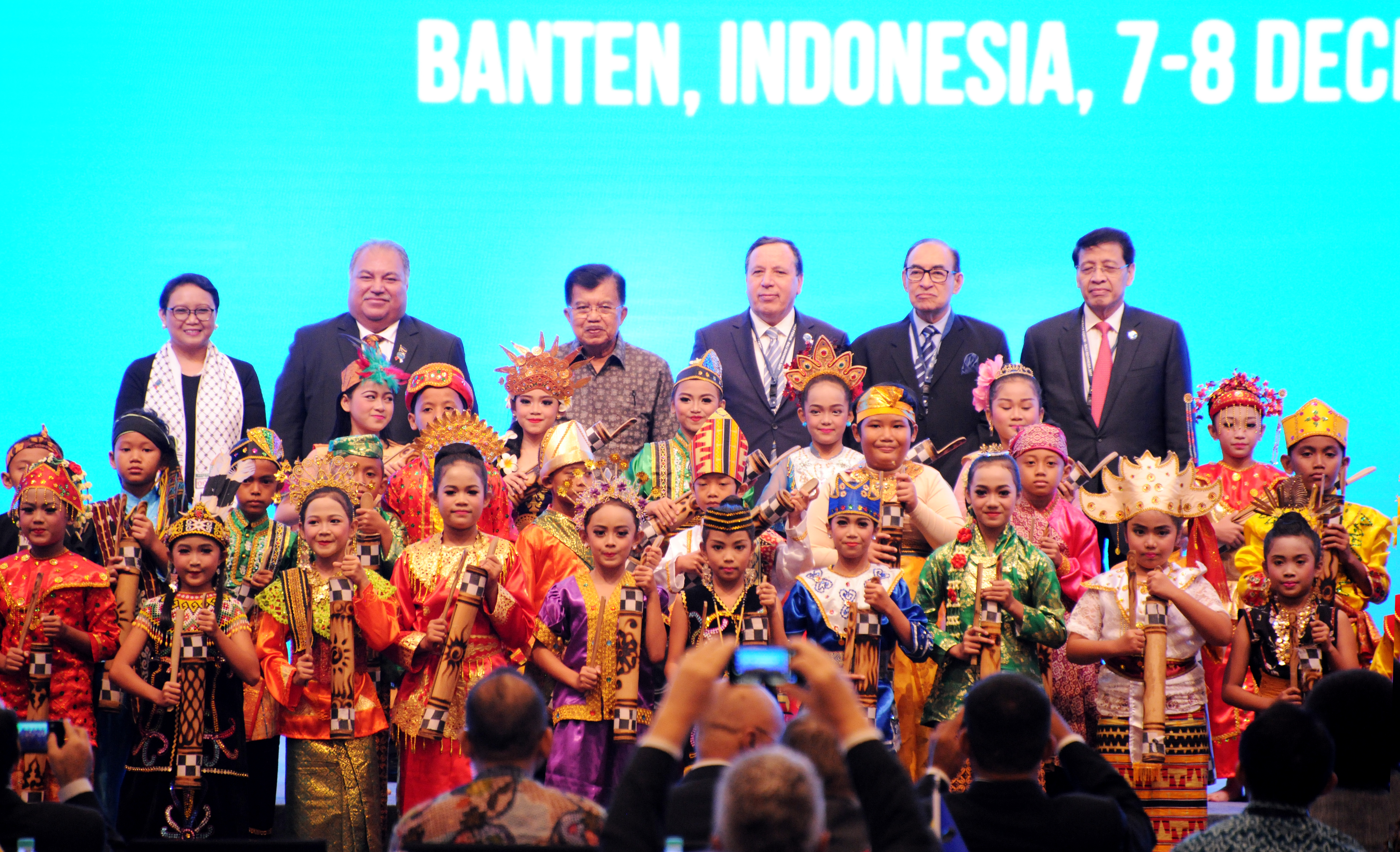
The tenth meeting of Bali Democracy Forum

The 10th BDF was held on 7–8 December 2017 in Banten, bearing the theme “Does Democracy Deliver?” The 10th BDF was officially opened by the Vice President of the Republic of Indonesia and was attended by officials from ninety-nine countries seven international organizations.

The new initiative in this Forum was the organization of the Bali Democracy Students Conference (BDSC) that runs in parallel with the 10th BDF. The BDF Chapter Tunis was also held this year in Tunisia on October 2, 2017. The report of the BDF Chapter Tunisia was presented by the Minister of Foreign Affairs of Tunisia during the opening session of the 10th BDF.

The delegates were welcomed and hosted by the Governor of West Java and observed a coffee exhibition at Gedung Sate. The delegation also visited Bekraf Festival 2017 at Gedung Merdeka, and visited the Asia Africa Conference Museum.

=== BDF XI ===
BDF XI was held on 6–7 December 2018 with the theme “Democracy for Prosperity.” This theme was a continuation from the previous forum which discussed the idea that the growth of the economy, investment, business, health care, and prosperity are the result of democracy. The continuing conversation discussed the role of democracy in creating a prosperous society.

BDSC will also run in parallel with the BDF XI bearing the theme “Democracy for Prosperity: Youth’s Perspective” as well as the Bali Civil Society and Media Forum (BCSMF).

== BDF chapters ==
=== BDF Chapter Tunis ===
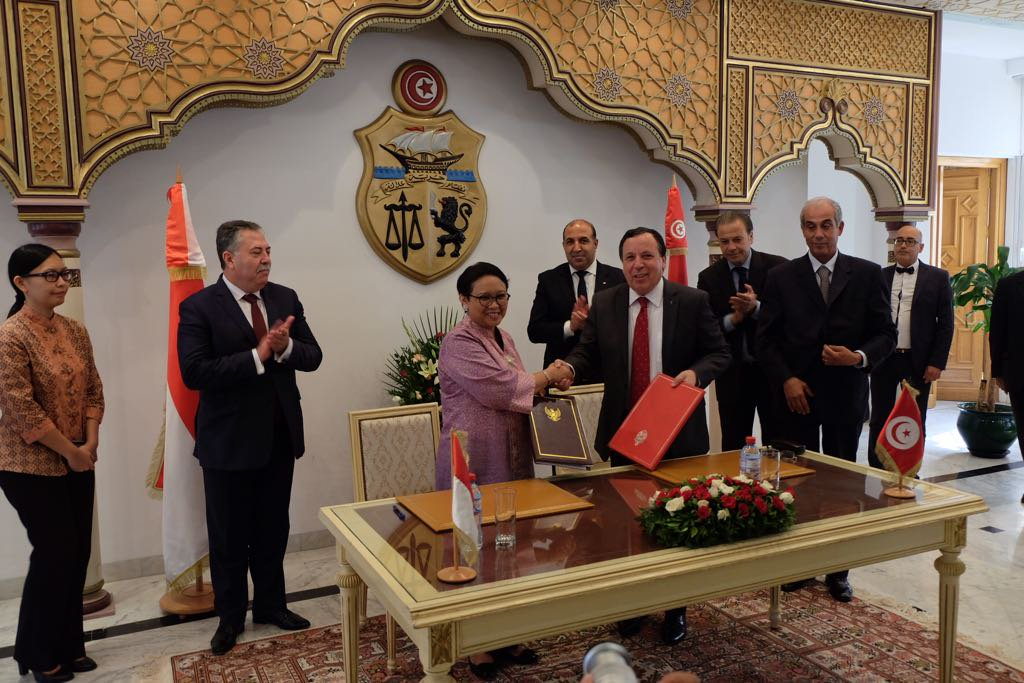
Cooperation between the Foreign Minister of Indonesia and Tunisia

On 2 October 2017, BDF Chapter Tunis was conducted, which was a cooperation between the Indonesian Foreign Ministry, Tunisian Foreign Ministry, and Institute Tunisien des Etudes Stratégiques (ITES). BDF Chapter Tunis was attended by fifty participants from high-level officials and academics from five North African Countries (Tunisia, Libya, Algeria, Morocco, and Egypt).

This was the first BDF held outside Indonesia, strengthening Indonesia's position as a country with a moderate Muslim community committed to strengthening democracy through dialogue.

=== BDF Chapter Berlin ===
The Ministry for Foreign Affairs of the Republic of Indonesia, in collaboration with the Federal Foreign Office of the Federal Republic of Germany, and Friedrich Ebert Stiftung Foundation has organized the BDF Berlin Chapter in Berlin, Germany on 14 September 2018. With the theme “Democracy and Migration”, the forum's purpose was to share experiences on handling migration issues, democracy in Asia and Europe, and the response of the international society towards migration issues in democracy.

BDF Chapter Berlin was attended by more than one-hundred and twenty delegates, among others from German Government, European Commission, Diplomatic Corps, academics, think tanks, and International NGO's from several countries namely England, Austria, Belgium, Switzerland, India, Philippines, Thailand, Malaysia, and Armenia.
