= Bachtiar Aly =

Indonesian diplomat, politician and academic (1949–2026)

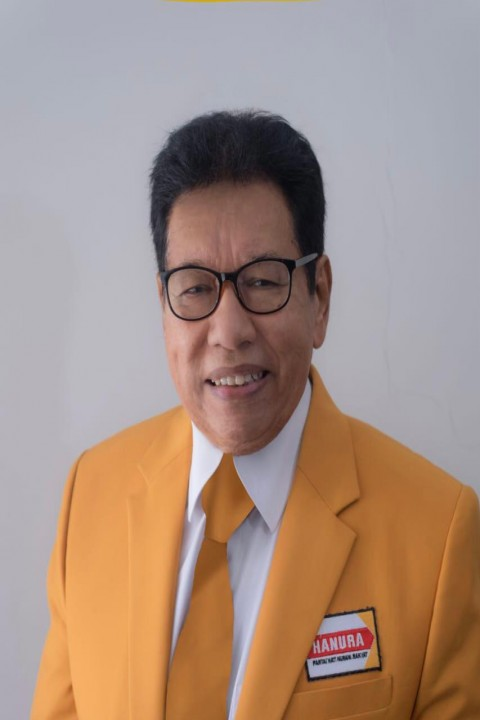

Indonesian Ambassador for Egypt
- In office 2002–2005

Member of the People's Representative Council
- In office 2014–2019

Personal details
- Born: 21 December 1949 Banda Aceh, Aceh, Indonesia
- Died: 26 July 2026 (aged 76)
- Occupation: Academic, politician, diplomat

Bachtiar Aly (21 December 1949 – 26 July 2026) was an Indonesian politician, diplomat, and academic. He majored in communication and politics. Aly was the Indonesian Ambassador for Egypt from 2002 to 2005. From 2014 to 2019, he was member of the People's Representative Council under the NasDem Party.

== Life and career ==
Aly was born on 21 December 1949. He studied journalism at Padjadjaran University, Bandung. Aly continued his studies in Germany, where he obtained a masters and a doctorate degree in 1983. In 1984, he began writing some communications books in Indonesia. He was a lecturer in communication studies at The University of Indonesia, Jakarta.

In 2017, he warned that social media would decrease solidarity and bring a higher sense of individualism.

Aly died on 26 July 2026, at the age of 76.
